= Chester Cathedral =

Cathedral in Chester and the seat of the Bishop of Chester

- Cathedral Church of Christ and the Blessed Virgin Mary
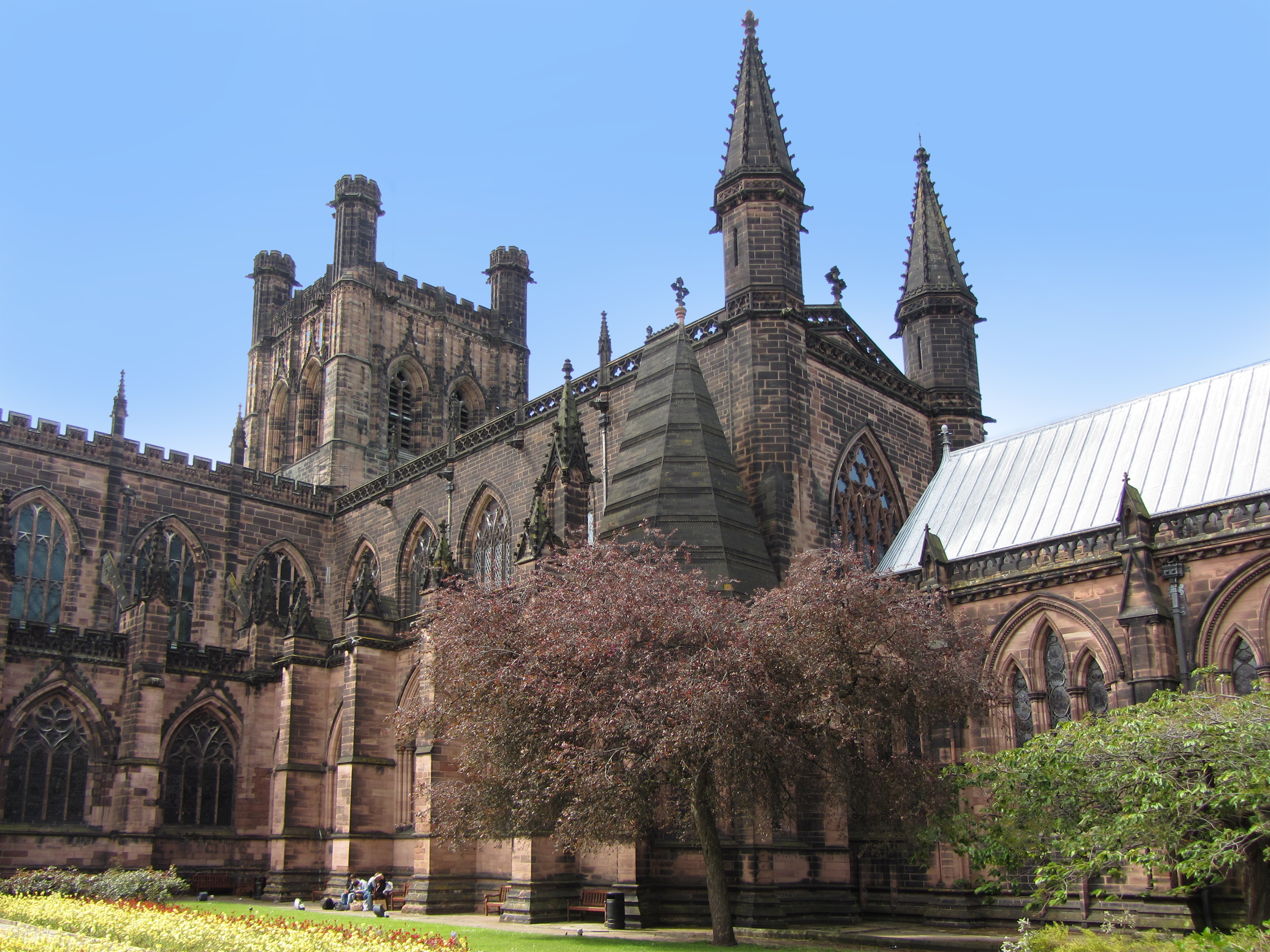
- East end of the cathedral

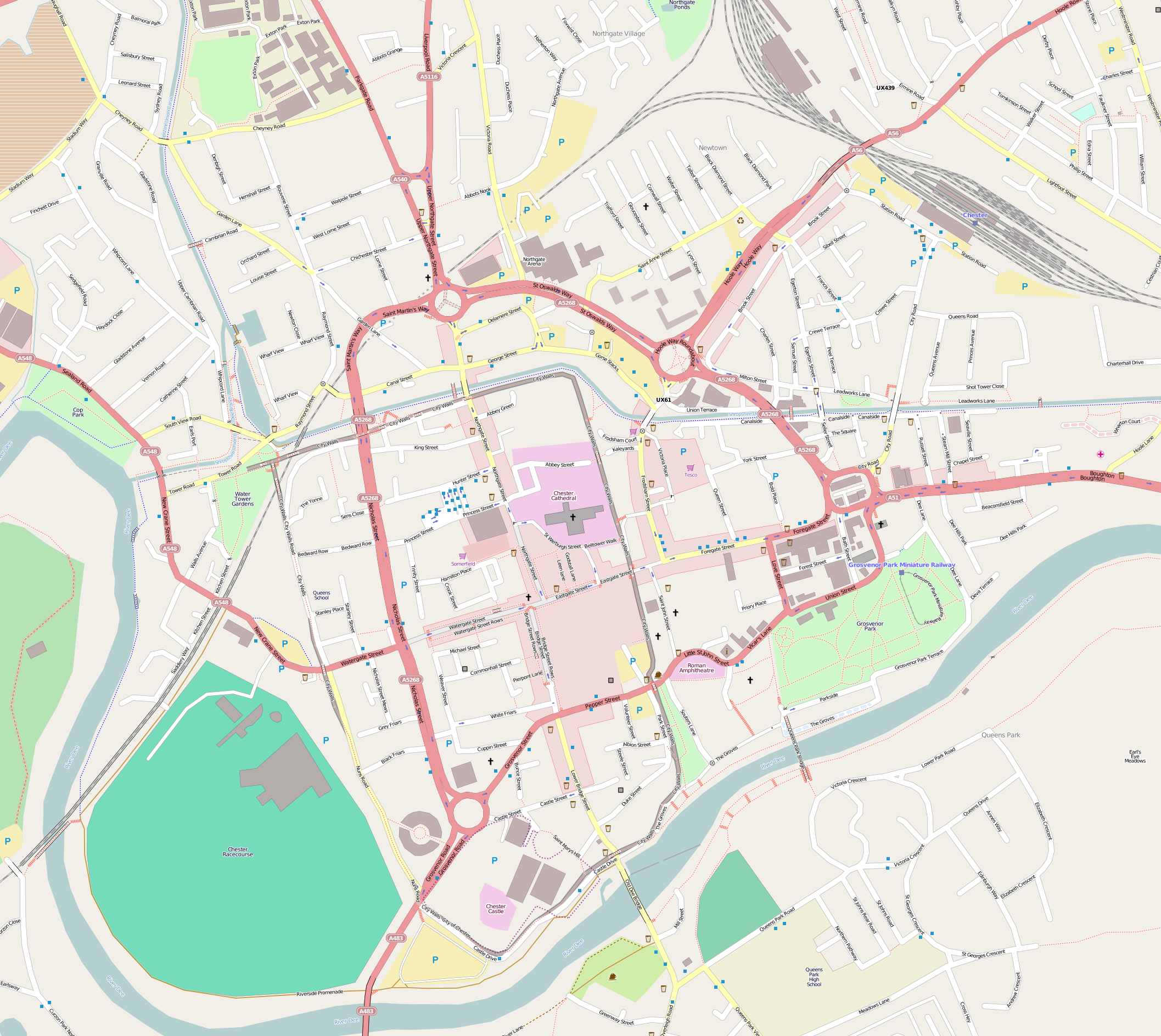
- Location in Chester
- 53°11′31″N 2°53′26″W
- OS grid reference: SJ 40600 66446
- Location: St Werburgh Street, Chester, Cheshire
- Country: England
- Denomination: Church of England
- Previous denomination: Roman Catholic
- Website: chestercathedral.com

History
- Dedication: Christ and the Blessed Virgin Mary

Architecture
- Architect(s): Richard Lenginour (1272–1314); Nicholas de Derneford (?)(1316–31); William Rediche(?) (1461–90s); Seth and George Derwall (1495–1530s); Thomas Harrison, George Gilbert Scott
- Style: Romanesque, Gothic

Specifications
- Length: 355 ft (108 m)

Administration
- Province: York
- Diocese: Chester

Clergy
- Bishop: Mark Tanner
- Dean: Tim Stratford Philip Rushforth (Organist and Master of the Choristers); Dan Mathieson (Head of Music Outreach and Assistant Organist) Alex Lanigan-Palotai (Sub Organist)

Chester Cathedral is a Church of England cathedral and the mother church of the Diocese of Chester. It is located in the city of Chester, Cheshire, England. The cathedral, formerly the abbey church of a Benedictine monastery dedicated to Saint Werburgh, is dedicated to Christ and the Blessed Virgin Mary. Since 1541, it has been the seat of the bishop of Chester.

The cathedral is a Grade I listed building, and part of a heritage site that also includes the former monastic buildings to the north, which are also listed Grade I. The cathedral's construction dates from between the 10th century and the early 16th century, having been modified a number of times throughout history, a typical characteristic of English cathedrals; however, the site itself may have been used for Christian worship since Roman times. All the major styles of English medieval architecture, from Norman to Perpendicular, are represented in the present building.

The cathedral and former monastic buildings were extensively restored during the 19th century (amidst some controversy), and a free standing bell tower was added in the 20th century. In addition to holding services for Christian worship, the buildings are a major tourist attraction in Chester and the cathedral is used as a venue for concerts and exhibitions.

== History ==
The city of Chester was an important Roman stronghold. There may have been a Christian basilica on the site of the present cathedral in the late Roman era, while Chester was controlled by Legio XX Valeria Victrix. Legend holds that the basilica was dedicated to Saint Paul and Saint Peter. This is supported by evidence that in Saxon times the dedication of an early chapel on this site was changed from Saint Peter to Saint Werburgh. In 958 King Edgar granted land to the Minster of St Werburgh in Chester.

During the Early Middle Ages Barloc of Norbury, a Catholic Celtic saint and hermit, was venerated at Chester Cathedral with a feast day on 10 September. He is known to history mainly through the hagiography of the Secgan manuscript; he also occurs in a litany in MS Tanner 169* of the Bodleian Library, Oxford.

In 907 Chester was refortified against the threat from the Vikings, and shortly afterwards the minster was founded or refounded, and Werburgh's remains were transferred there from Hanbury, probably by Æthelflæd, Lady of the Mercians. The collegiate church, as it was then, was restored in 1057 by Leofric, Earl of Mercia, and Lady Godiva. This church was razed to the ground around 1090, with the secular canons evicted, and no known trace of it remains.

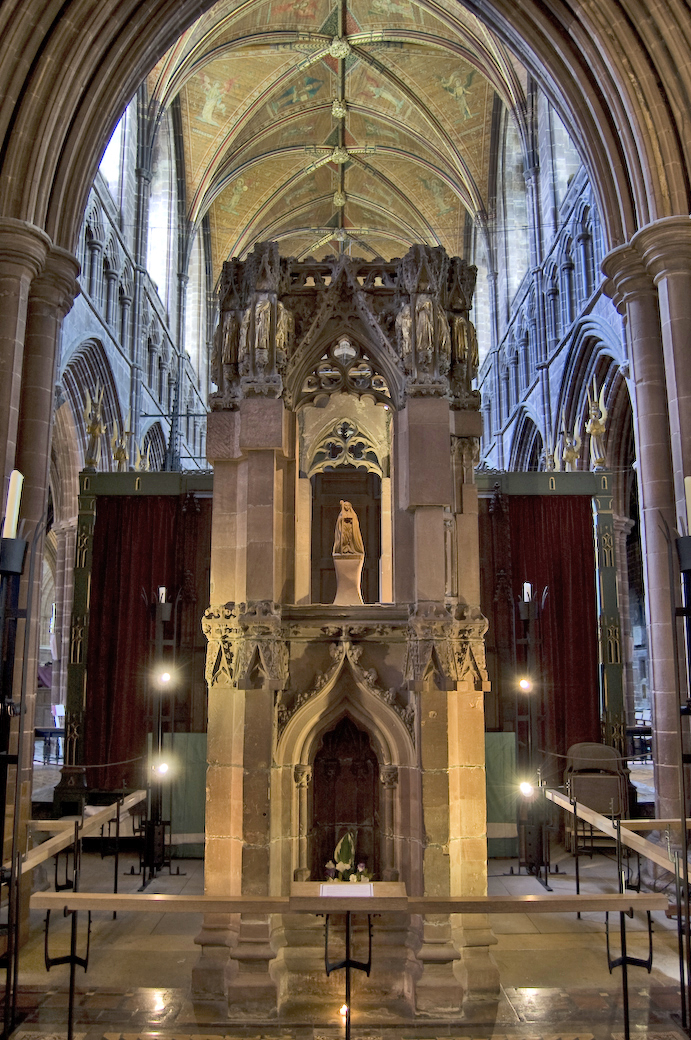
The Shrine of Werburgh was reinstated in the 19th century.

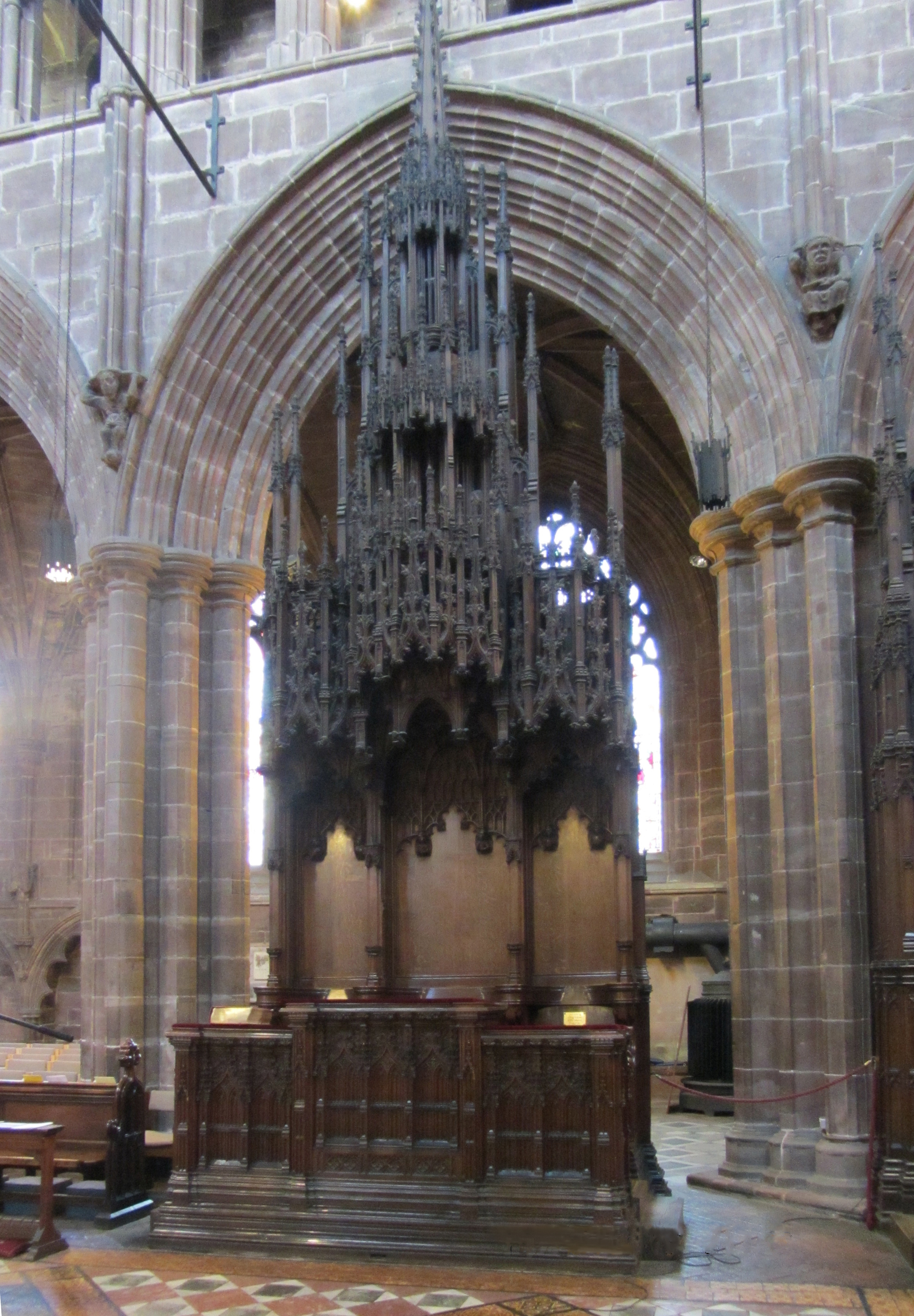
The Bishop's Throne was created in the 19th century in the style of the 14th century choir stalls.

In 1093 a Benedictine abbey was established on the site by Hugh Lupus, Earl of Chester, with the assistance of St Anselm and other monks from Bec in Normandy. The earliest surviving parts of the structure date from that time. The abbey church was not at that time the cathedral of Chester; from 1075 to 1082 the cathedral of the diocese was the nearby church of St John the Baptist, after which the see was transferred to Coventry. In 1538, during the dissolution of the monasteries, the monastery was disbanded and the shrine of Saint Werburgh was desecrated. In 1541 St Werburgh's abbey became a cathedral of the Church of England, by order of Henry VIII. At the same time, the dedication was changed to Christ and the Blessed Virgin. The last abbot of St Werburgh's Abbey, Thomas Clarke, became the first dean of the new cathedral, at the head of a secular chapter.

Although little trace of the 10th-century church has been discovered, save possibly some Saxon masonry found during a 1997 excavation of the nave, there is much evidence of the monastery of 1093. This work in the Norman style may be seen in the northwest tower, the north transept and in remaining parts of the monastic buildings. The abbey church, beginning with the Lady Chapel at the eastern end, was extensively rebuilt in Gothic style during the 13th and 14th centuries. At the time of the dissolution of the monasteries, the cloister, the central tower, a new south transept, the large west window and a new entrance porch to the south had just been built in the Perpendicular style, and the southwest tower of the façade had been begun. The west front was given a Tudor entrance, but the tower was never completed.

In 1636 the space beneath the south west tower became a bishop's consistory court. It was furnished as such at that time, and is now a unique survival in England, hearing its last case, that of an attempted suicide of a priest, in the 1930s. Until 1881, the south transept, which is unusually large, also took on a separate function as an independent ecclesiastical entity: the parish church of St Oswald. Although the 17th century saw additions to the furnishings and fittings, there was no further building work for several centuries. By the 19th century, the building was badly in need of restoration. The present homogeneous appearance that the cathedral presents from many exterior angles is largely the work of Victorian restorers, particularly George Gilbert Scott.

The 20th century has seen continued maintenance and restoration. In 1922, the Chester War Memorial was installed in the cathedral grounds and dedicated to the fallen soldiers of the First World War and later the Second World War. In 1973–75 a detached belfry, the Addleshaw Tower, designed by George Pace, was erected in the grounds of the cathedral. In 2005 a new Song School was added to the cathedral. During the 2000s, the cathedral library was refurbished and relocated. It was officially reopened in September 2007. The cathedral and the former monastic buildings were designated as Grade I listed buildings on 28 July 1955.

In October 2021, the abbey's gateway was one of 142 sites across England to receive part of a £35-million injection into the government's Culture Recovery Fund.

== Architecture ==
=== Cathedral ===
==== Plan ====
Chester Cathedral has an east–west axis, common to many cathedrals, with the chancel at the eastern end, and the façade to the west. The plan is cruciform, with a central tower (as is usual in English monastic churches), but is asymmetrical, having a small transept on the north side remaining from an earlier building, and an unusually large south transept. As the plan shows, the asymmetry extends to the west front, where the north tower remains from the Norman building, and the south tower is of the early 16th century. At the eastern end, the symmetrical arrangement of the aisles was lost when the end of the south aisle was demolished and rebuilt in an apsidal shape. The nave, choir and south transept have wide aisles on either side, and are lit by clerestory windows and large multi-light windows in each of the three cliff-like ends. To the north of the cathedral are monastic buildings, including the cloister, refectory and a rectangular chapter house. The façade of the building is abutted on the north by later buildings.

1. West door 2. South tower & Consistory court 3. North tower 4. Nave; 5. Crossing; 6. Quire; 7. Lady Chapel; 8. South porch 9. South aisle 10. South transept 11. South door 12. South quire aisle/St. Erasmus chapel 13. North aisle 14. North transept 15. North quire aisle	16. St. Werburgh's Chapel; 17. Vestry; 18. Vestibule; 19. Chapter house 20. Slype; 21. Monk's Parlour with Song School above it.; 22. Refectory; 23. Shop; 24. Undercroft; 25. Abbot's Passage; 26. Cloister; 27. Cloister garth 28. Reception; 29. Memorial garden	a. Font b. RAF Memorial chapel c. Monument to 1st Duke of Westminster d. Cheshire Regiment Memorial e. St Mary Magdalen Chapel (Children's Chapel) f. St. Oswald's Chapel g. St. George's Chapel (Cheshire Regiment) h. St. Nicholas' Chapel i. Choir Stalls j. Bishop's Throne k. High Altar l. St. Werburgh's Shrine m. East Window	n. organ o. John Pearson's Tomb p. Cobweb painting q. Night Stairs r. Day Stairs s. Wall Pulpit t. Lavatorium u. Norman entrance to refectory v. Carells w. Scriptorium x. Fountain and Sculpture y. Education centre z. WCs

==== External appearance ====
Like the cathedrals of Carlisle, Lichfield and Worcester, Chester Cathedral is built of New Red Sandstone, in this case Keuper Sandstone from the Cheshire Basin. The stone lends itself to detailed carving, but is also friable, easily eroded by rain and wind, and is badly affected by pollution. With the other red sandstone buildings, Chester is one of the most heavily restored of England's cathedrals. The restoration, which included much refacing and many new details, took place mainly in the 19th century.

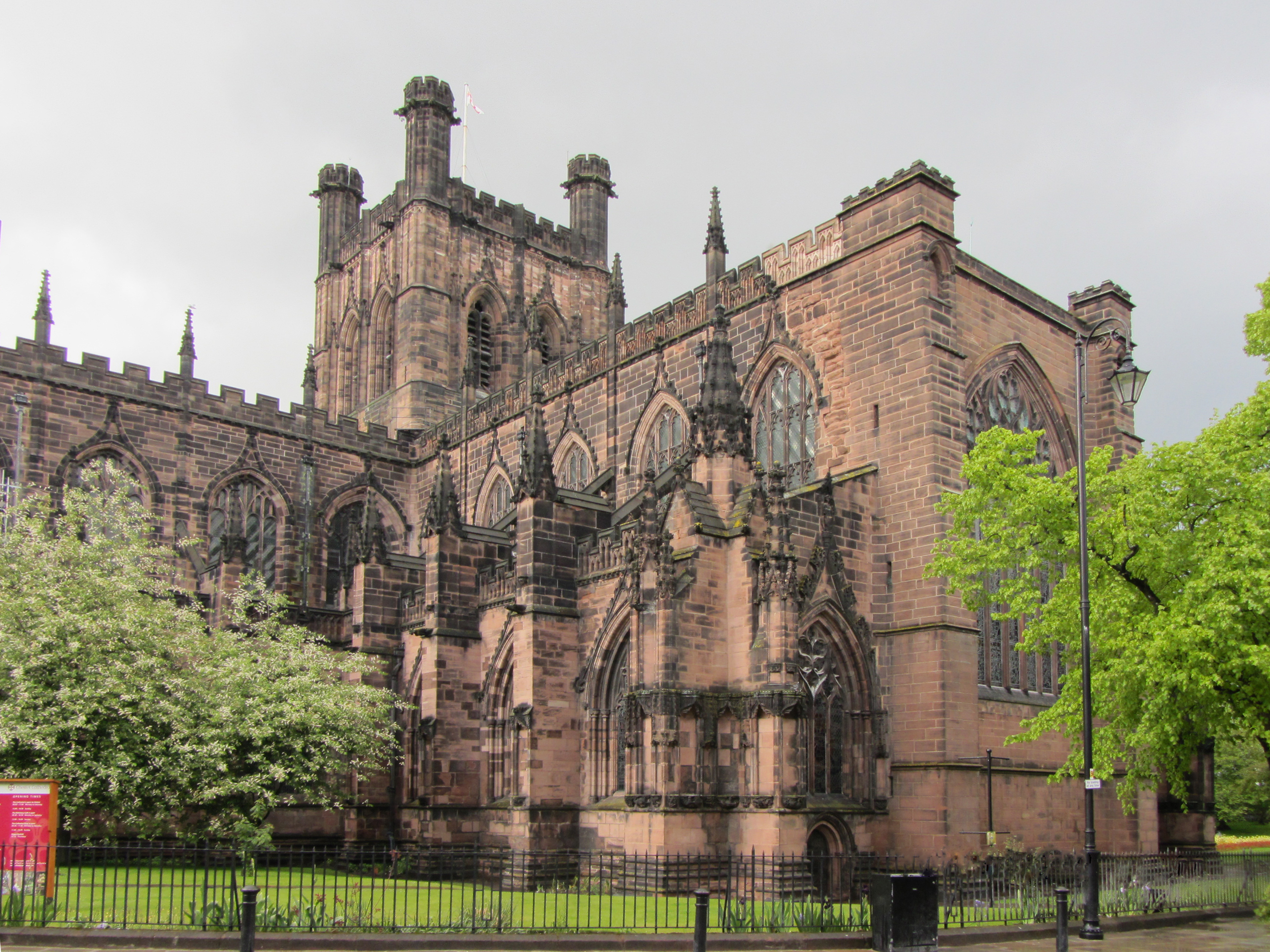
The sandstone exterior (from the south west) has much decorative architectural detail but is heavily restored.

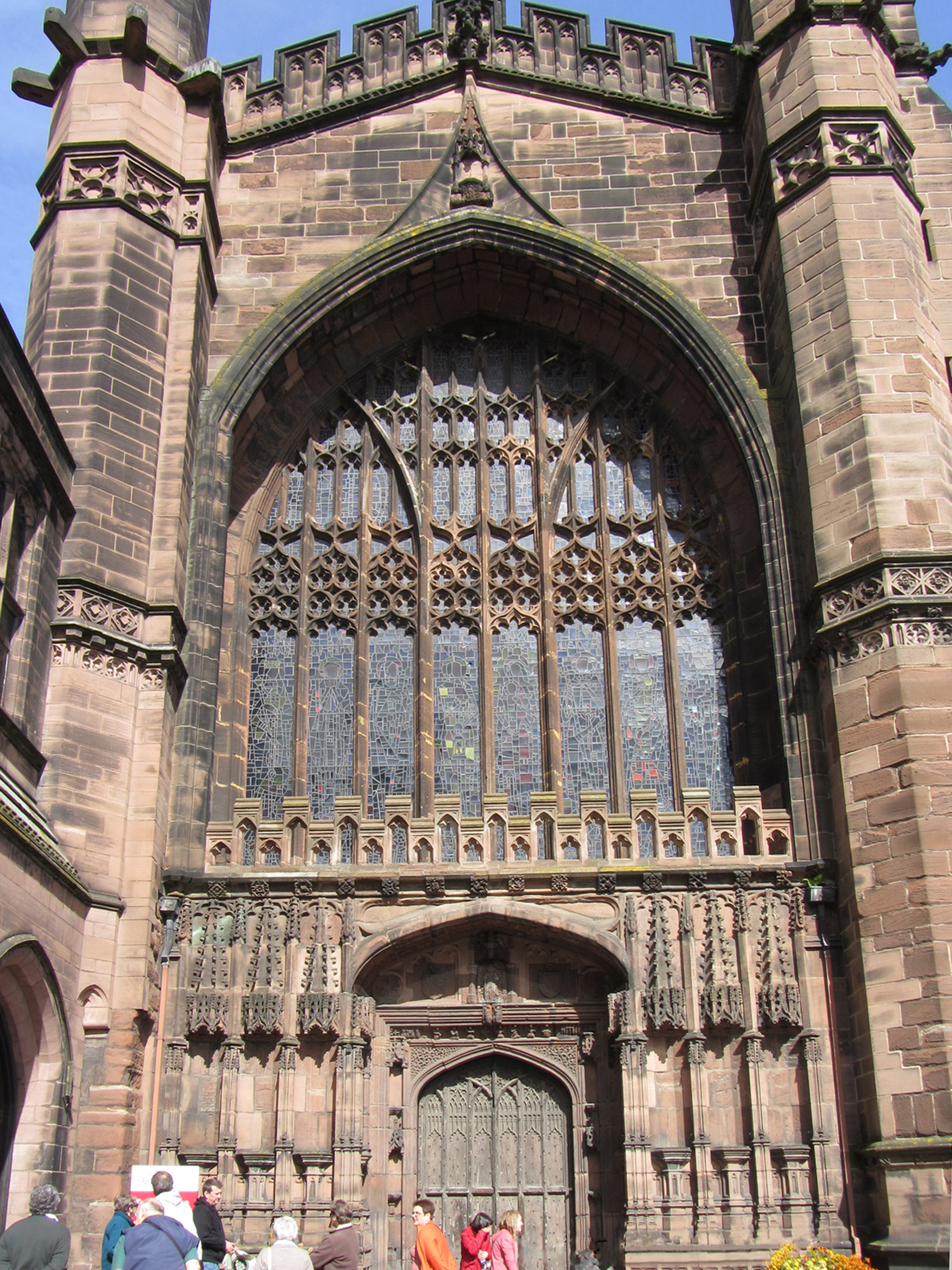
The west front with recessed Perpendicular window and portal

Because the south transept is similar in dimension to the nave and choir, views of the building from the south-east and south-west give the impression of a building balanced around a central axis, with its tower as the hub. The tower is of the late 15th century Perpendicular style, but its four large battlemented turrets are the work of the restoration architect George Gilbert Scott. With its rhythmic arrangement of large, traceried windows, pinnacles, battlements and buttresses, the exterior of Chester Cathedral from the south presents a fairly homogeneous character, which is an unusual feature as England's cathedrals are in general noted for their stylistic diversity. Close examination reveals window tracery of several building stages from the 13th to the early 16th century. The richness of the 13th-century tracery is accentuated by the presence of ornate, crocketted drip-mouldings around the windows; those around the perpendicular windows are of simpler form.

The façade of the cathedral is dominated by a large deeply recessed eight-light window in the Perpendicular style, above a recessed doorway set in a screen-like porch designed, probably by Seth and George Derwall, in the early 1500s. This porch formed part of the same late 15th-century building programme as the south transept, central and southwest towers, and cloister. Neither of the west towers was completed. To the north is the lower stage of a Norman tower, while to the south is the lower stage of a tower designed and begun, probably by Seth and George Derwall, in 1508, but left incomplete following the dissolution of the monastery in 1538. The cathedral's façade is abutted on the north by a Victorian building housing the education centre and largely obscured from view by the building previously used as the King's School and the Choir School which was until 2024 a branch of Barclays Bank. The door of the west front is not used as the normal entrance to the cathedral, which is through the southwest porch which is in an ornate Tudor style.

==== Interior ====
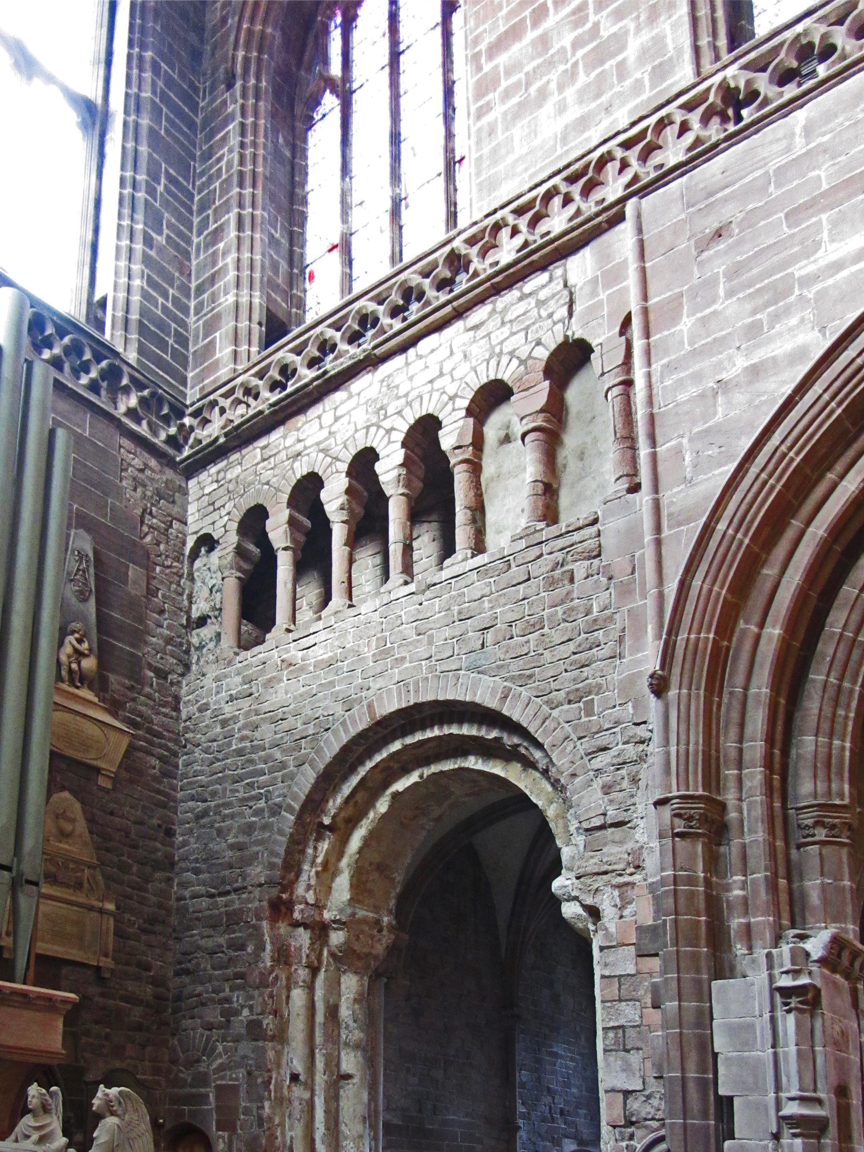
Norman architecture in the north transept

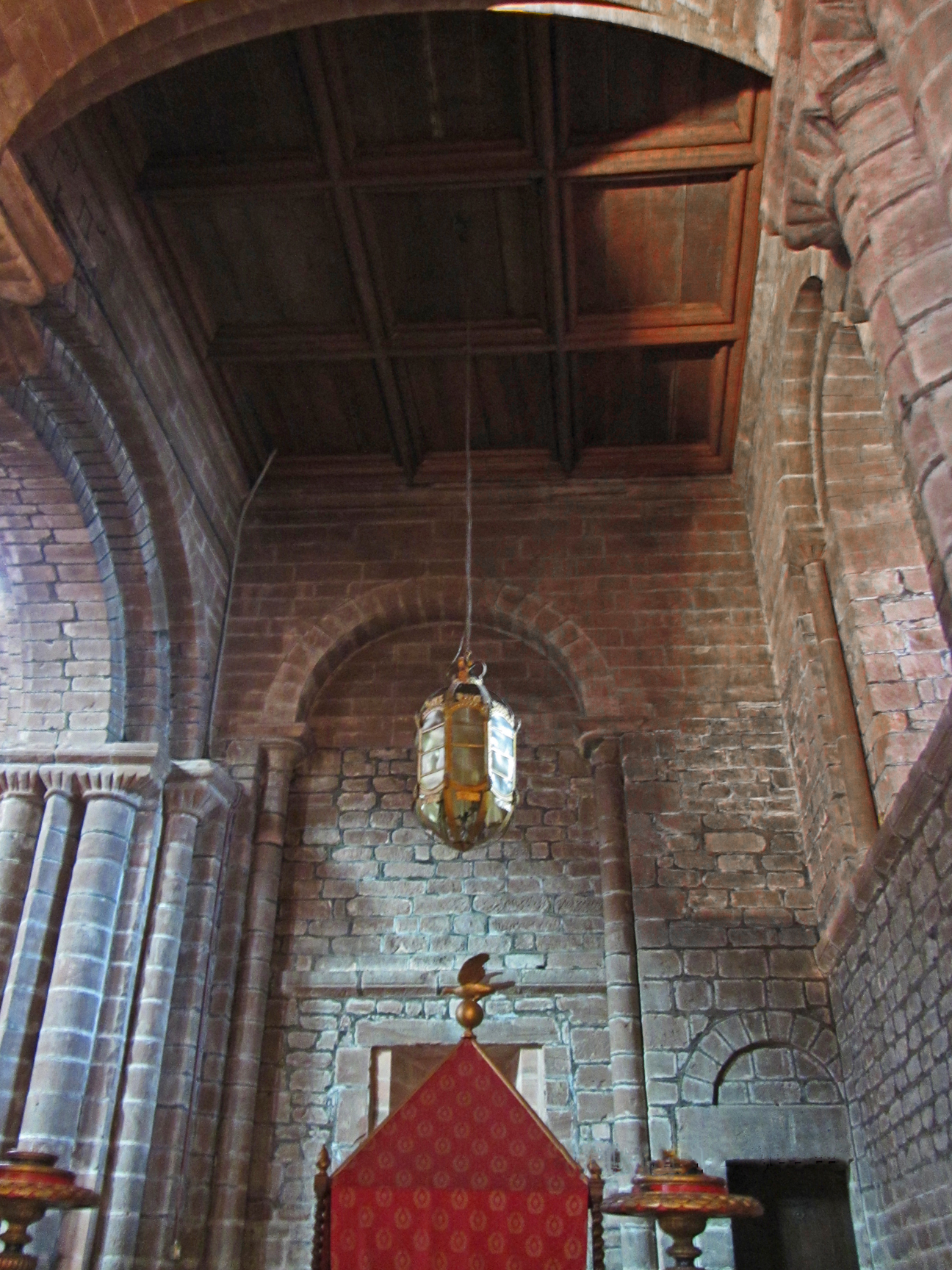
The font stands under the Norman north-west tower.

The interior of Chester Cathedral gives a warm and mellow appearance because of the pinkish colour of the sandstone. The proportions appear spacious because the view from the west end of the nave to the east end is unimpeded by a pulpitum and the nave, although not long, is both wide and high compared with many of England's cathedrals. The piers of the nave and choir are widely spaced, those of the nave carrying only the clerestory of large windows with no triforium gallery. The proportions are made possible partly because the ornate stellar vault, like that at York Minster, is of wood, not stone.

==== Norman remnants ====
The present building, dating from around 1283 to 1537, mostly replaced the earlier monastic church founded in 1093 which was built in the Norman style. It is believed that the newer church was built around the older one. That the few remaining parts of the Norman church are of small proportions, while the height and width of the Gothic church are generous would seem to confirm this belief. Aspects of the design of the Norman interior are still visible in the north transept, which retains wall arcading and a broadly moulded arch leading to the sacristy, which was formerly a chapel. The transept has retained an early 16th-century coffered ceiling with decorated bosses, two of which are carved with the arms of Henry VIII and Cardinal Wolsey.

The north west tower is also of Norman construction. It serves as the baptistry and houses a black marble font, consisting of a bowl on a large baluster dating from 1697. The lower part of the north wall of the nave is also from the Norman building, but can only be viewed from the cloister because the interior has been decorated with mosaic.

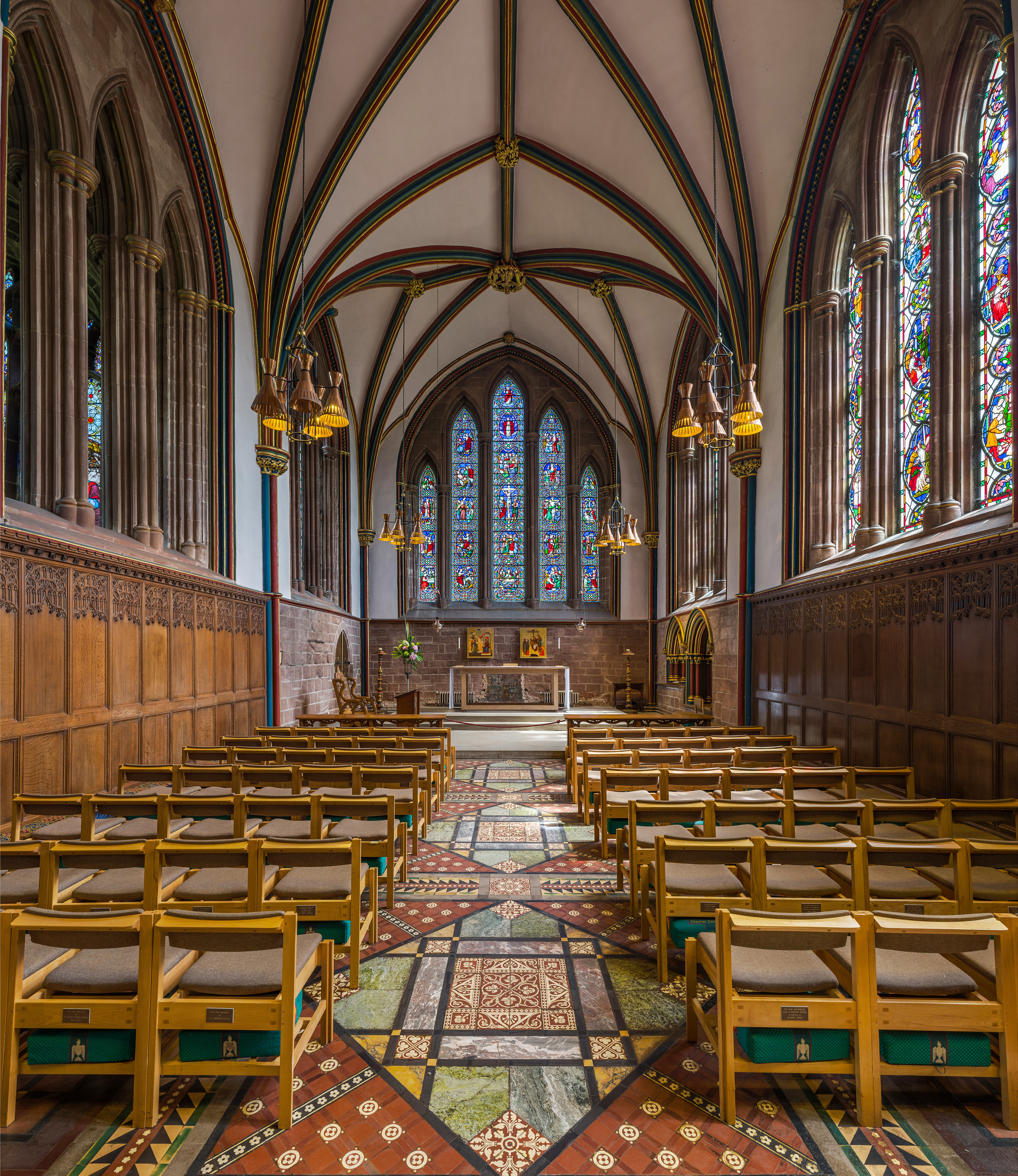
The Lady Chapel, Early English Gothic (1265–1290)

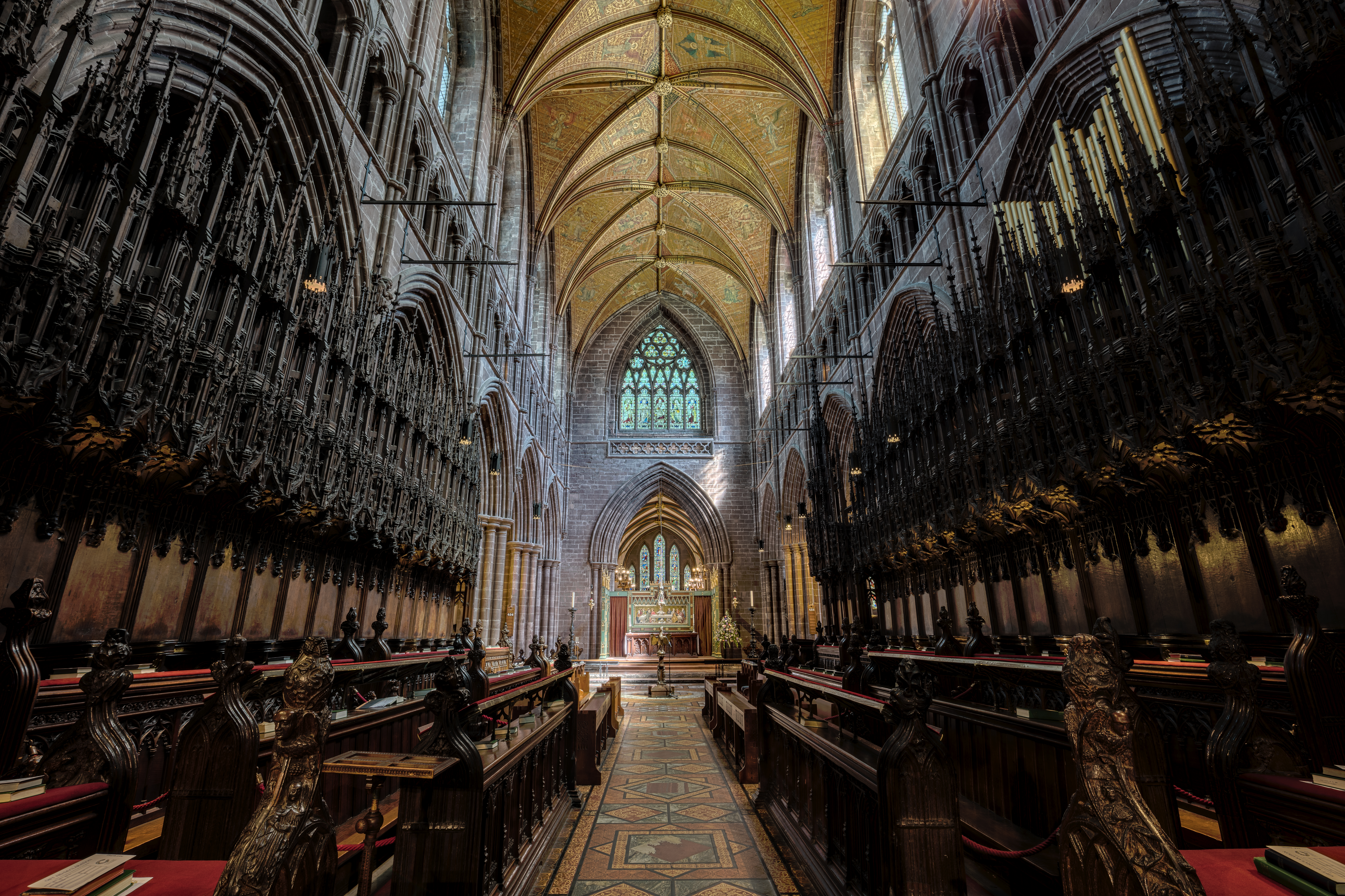
The Choir, Decorated Gothic (1283–1315)

==== Early English ====
The Early English Gothic chapter house, built between 1230 and 1265, is rectangular and opens off a "charming" vestibule leading from the north transept. The chapter house has grouped windows of simple untraceried form. Alec Clifton-Taylor describes the exterior of this building as a "modest but rather elegant example of composition in lancets" while Nikolaus Pevsner says of the interior "It is a wonderfully noble room" which is the "aesthetic climax of the cathedral". To the north of the chapter house is the slype, also Early English in style, and the warming room, which contains two large former fireplaces. The monastic refectory to the north of the cloister is of about the same date as the chapter house.

The Lady Chapel to the eastern end of the choir dates from between 1265 and 1290. It is of three bays, and contains the Shrine of St Werburgh, dating from the 14th century. The vault of the Lady Chapel is the only one in the cathedral that is of stone. It is decorated with carved roof bosses representing the Trinity, the Madonna and Child, and the murder of Thomas Becket. The chapel also has a sedilia and a piscina.

==== Decorated Gothic ====
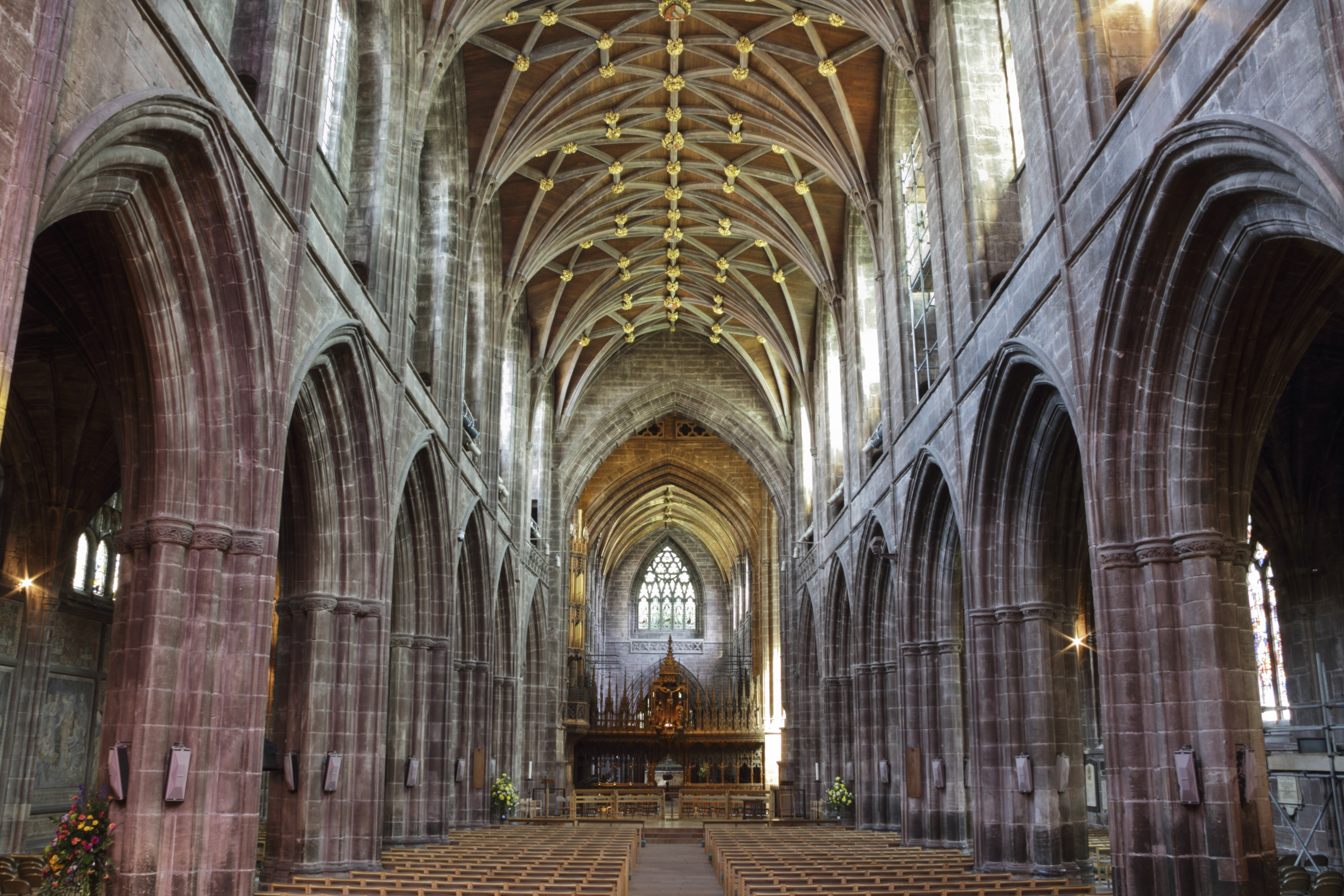
The building of the nave, begun in 1323, was halted by plague and completed 150 years later.

The choir, of five bays, was built between 1283 and 1315 to the design of Richard Lenginour, and is an early example of Decorated Gothic architecture. The piers have strongly modelled attached shafts, supporting deeply moulded arches. There is a triforium gallery with four cusped arches to each bay. The sexpartite vault, which is a 19th-century restoration, is supported by clusters of three shafts which spring from energetic figurative corbels. The overall effect is robust, and contrasts with the delicacy of the pinnacled choir stalls, the tracery of the windows and the rich decoration of the vault which was carried out by the ecclesiastical designers, Clayton and Bell. The choir stalls, dating from about 1380, are one of the glories of the cathedral.

The aisles of the choir previously both extended on either side of the Lady Chapel. The south aisle was shortened in about 1870 by George Gilbert Scott, and given an apsidal east end, becoming the chapel of St Erasmus. The eastern end of the north aisle contains the chapel of St Werburgh.

The nave of six bays, and the large, aisled south transept were begun in about 1323, probably to the design of Nicholas de Derneford. There are a number of windows containing fine Flowing Decorated tracery of this period. The work ceased in 1375, in which year there was a severe outbreak of plague in England. The building of the nave was recommenced in 1485, more than 150 years after it was begun. The architect was probably William Rediche. Remarkably, for an English medieval architect, he maintained the original form, changing only the details. The nave was roofed with a stellar vault rather like that of the Lady Chapel at Ely and the choir at York Minster, both of which date from the 1370s. Like that at York, the vault is of wood, imitating stone.

==== Perpendicular Gothic ====
From about 1493 until 1525 the architect appears to have been Seth Derwall, succeeded by George Derwall until 1537. Seth Derwall completed the south transept to a Perpendicular Gothic design, as seen in the transomed windows of the clerestory. He also built the central tower, southwest porch and cloisters. Work commenced on the south west tower in 1508, but it had not risen above the roofline at the time of the dissolution of the monasteries, and has never been completed. The central tower, rising to 127 feet (39 m), is a lantern tower with large windows letting light into the crossing. Its external appearance has been altered by the addition of four battlemented turrets by George Gilbert Scott in the 19th century.

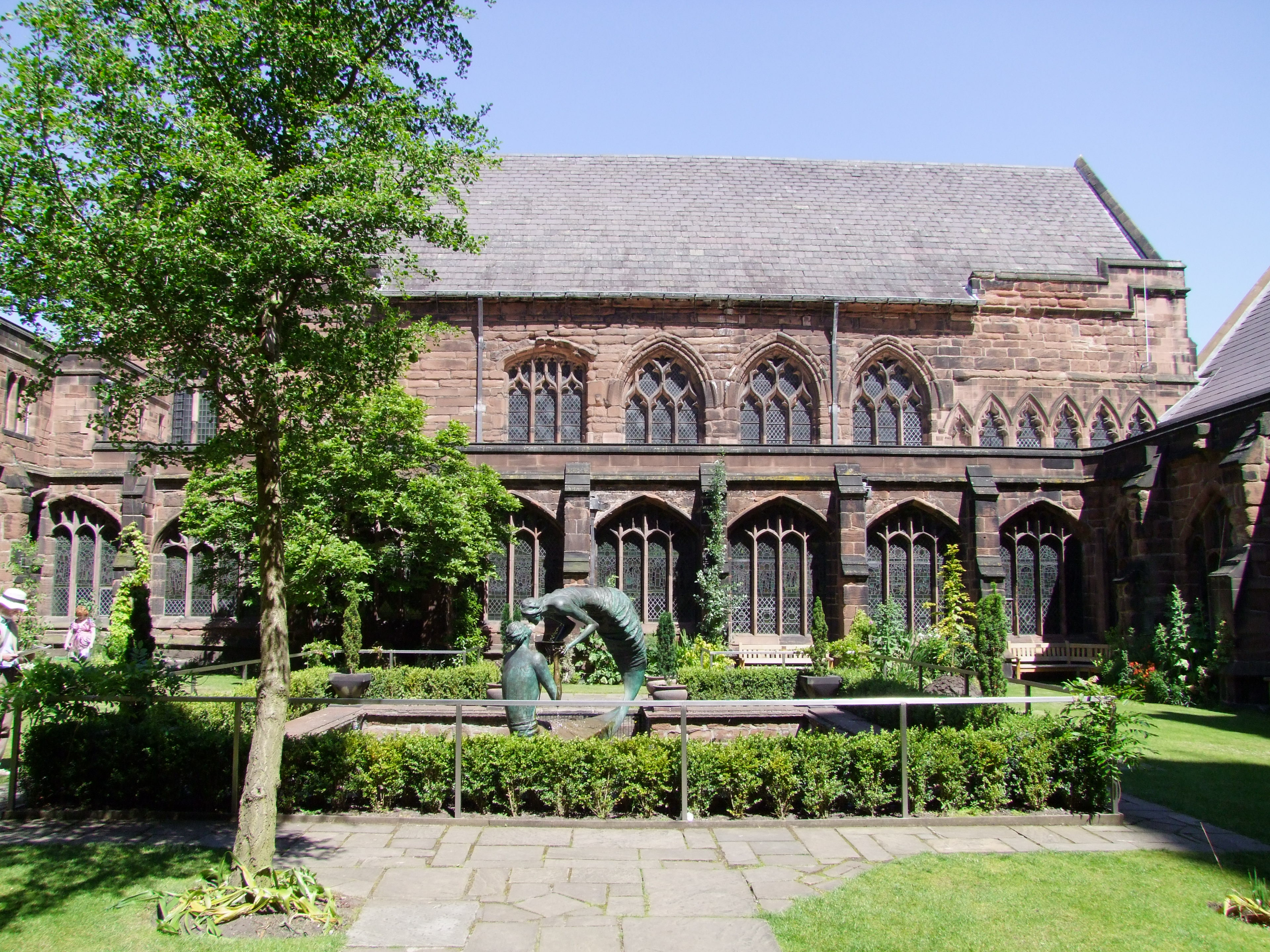
The Cloister Garth and Refectory

=== Former monastic buildings ===
The Perpendicular Gothic cloister is entered from the cathedral through a Norman doorway in the north aisle. The cloister is part of the building programme that commenced in the 1490s and is probably the work of Seth Derwall. The south wall of the cloister, dating from the later part of the Norman period, forms the north wall of the nave of the cathedral, and includes blind arcading. Among the earliest remaining structures on the site is an undercroft off the west range of the cloisters, which dates from the early 12th century, and which was originally used by the monks for storing food. It consists of two naves with groin vaults and short round piers with round scalloped capitals.

Leading from the south of the undercroft is the abbot's passage which dates from around 1150 and consists of two bays with rib-vaulting. Above the abbot's passage, approached by a stairway from the west cloister, is St Anselm's Chapel which also dates from the 12th century. It is in three bays and has a 19th century Gothic-style plaster vault. The chancel is in one bay and was remodelled in the early 17th century. The screen, altar rails, holy table and plaster ceiling of the chancel date from the 17th century. The north range of the cloister gives access to a refectory, built by Simon de Whitchurch in the 13th century. It contains an Early English pulpit, approached by a staircase with an ascending arcade. The only other similar pulpit in England is in Beaulieu Abbey.

=== Restoration ===
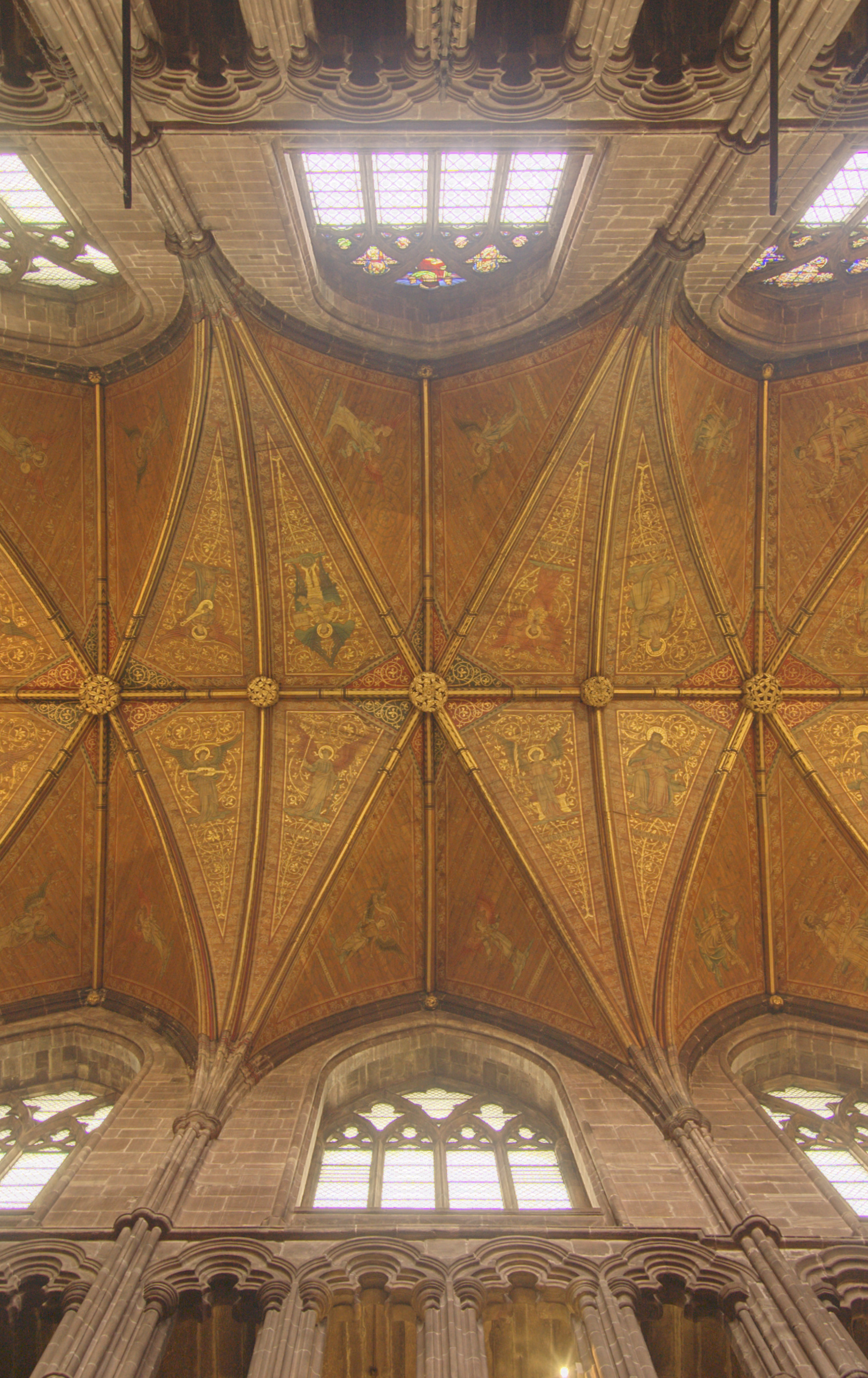
The wooden quadripartite vault of the choir was rebuilt by George Gilbert Scott.

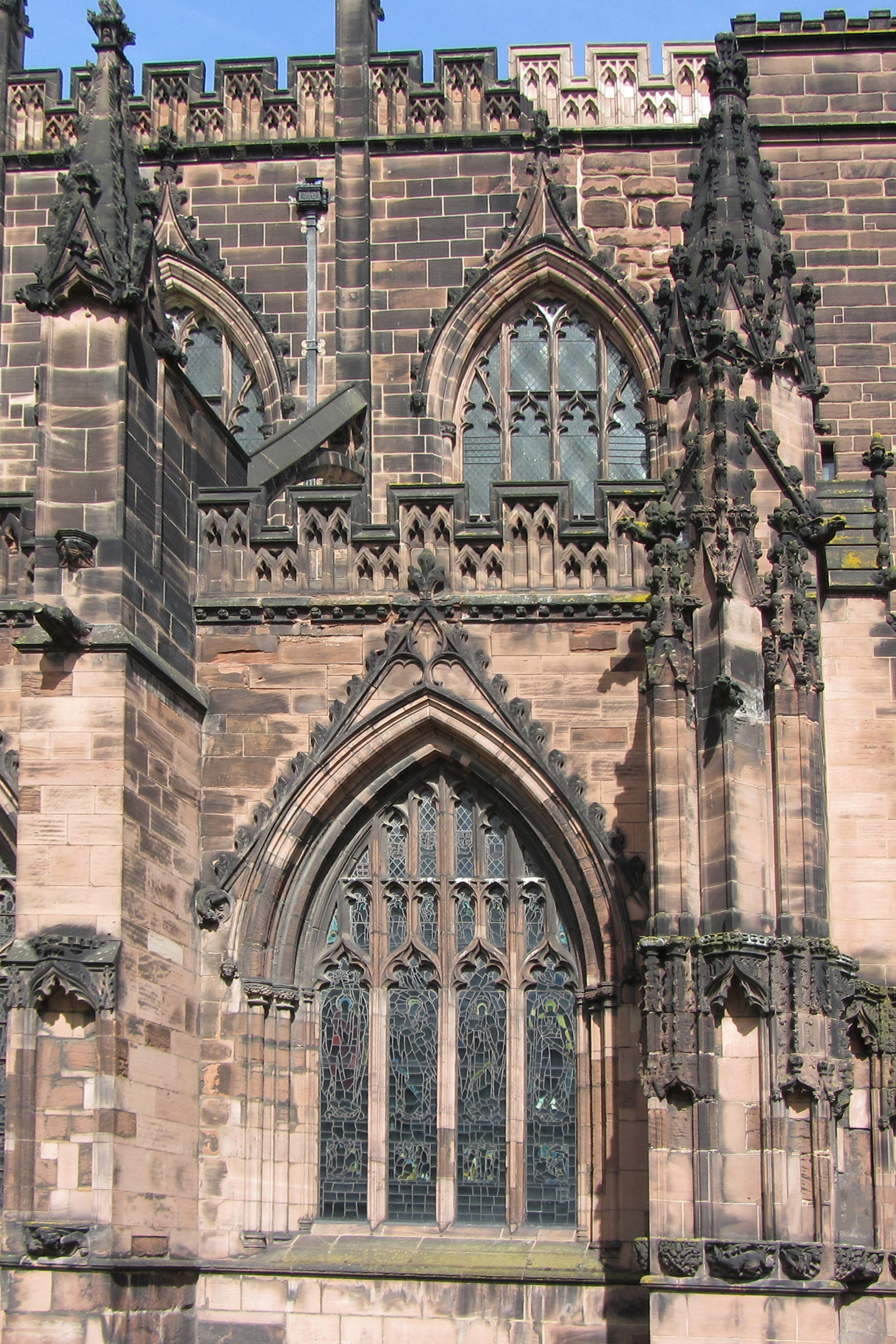
Much of the exterior stonework was refaced in the 19th and 20th centuries.

By the 19th century the fabric of the building had become badly weathered, with Charles Hiatt writing that "the surface rot of the very perishable red sandstone, of which the cathedral was built, was positively unsightly" and that the "whole place previous to restoration struck one as woebegone and neglected; it perpetually seemed to hover on the verge of collapse, and yet was without a trace of the romance of the average ruin". Between 1818 and 1820 the architect Thomas Harrison restored the south transept, adding corner turrets. This part of the building served until 1881 as the parish church of St Oswald, and it was ecclesiastically separate. From 1844 R. C. Hussey carried out a limited restoration including work on the south side of the nave.

The most extensive restoration was carried out by the Gothic Revival architect Sir Gilbert Scott, who between 1868 and 1876 "almost entirely re-cased" the cathedral. The current building is acknowledged to be mainly the product of this Victorian restoration commissioned by the Dean, John Saul Howson. In addition to extensive additions and alterations to the body of the church, Scott remodelled the tower, adding turrets and crenellations. Scott chose sandstone from the quarries at Runcorn for his restoration work. In addition to the restoration of the fabric of the building, Scott designed internal fittings such as the choir screen to replace those destroyed during the Civil War; the roof had also been melted down to make musket balls. He built the fan vault of the south porch, renewed the wooden vault of the choir and added a great many decorative features to the interior.

Scott's restorations were not without their critics and caused much debate in architectural circles. Scott claimed to have archaeological evidence for his work, but the Liverpool architect, Samuel Huggins, argued in an 1868 address to the Liverpool Architectural Society that the alterations were less like restoration and more like rebuilding. One of the larger changes was to shorten the south aisle and restyle it as an apse. The changes also proposed the addition of a spire above the existing tower, but this proposal was later rejected. Samuel's further paper of 1871 entitled On so-called restorations of our cathedral and abbey churches compelled the Dean to attempt to answer the criticism. The debate contributed to the establishment of the Society for the Protection of Ancient Buildings.

Later in the century, from 1882, Arthur Blomfield and his son Charles made further additions and modifications, including restoring and reinstating the Shrine of St Werburgh. More work was carried out in the 20th century by Giles Gilbert Scott between 1891 and 1913, and by F. H. Crossley in 1939.

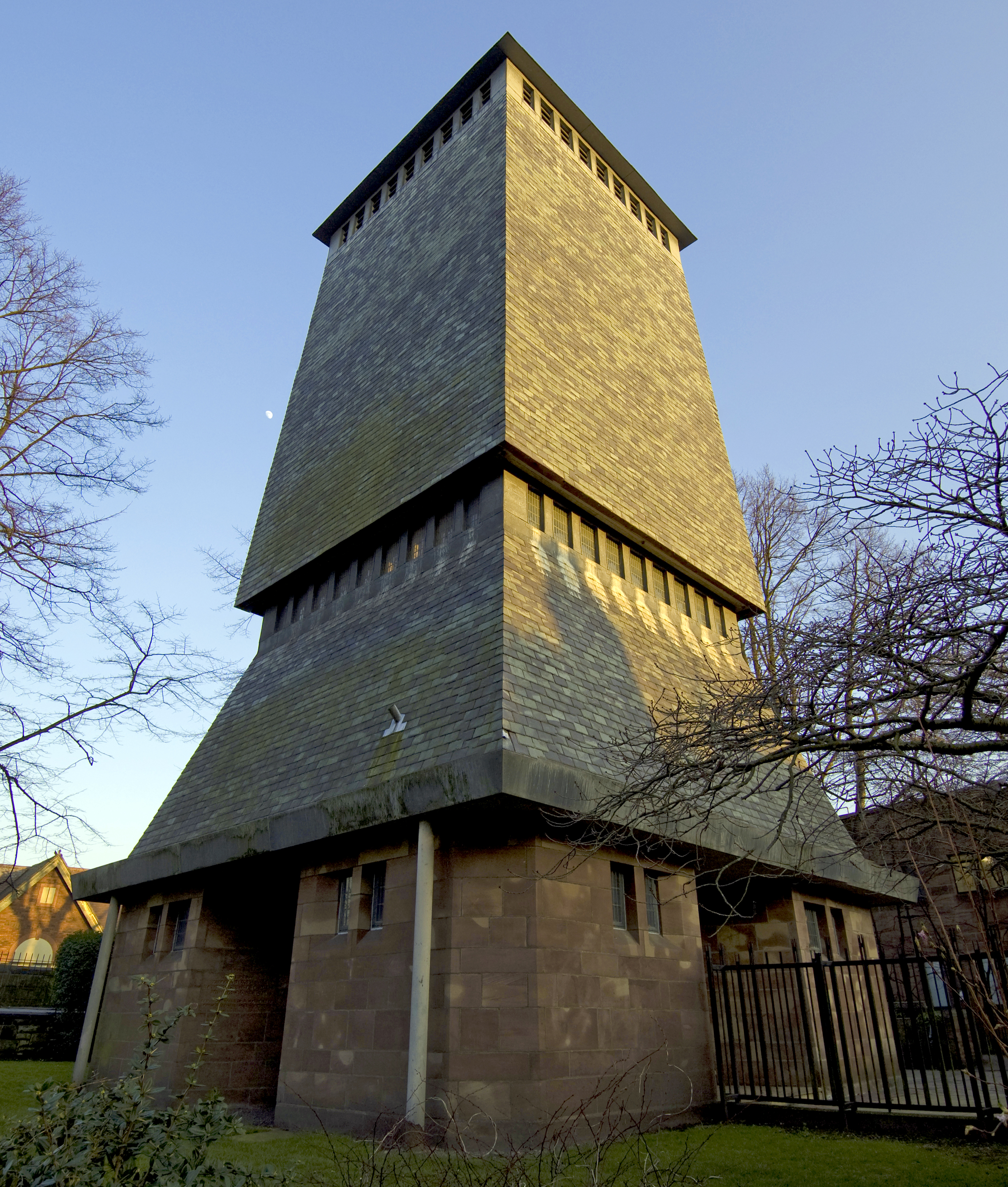
The Addleshaw Tower (1975) houses the bells.

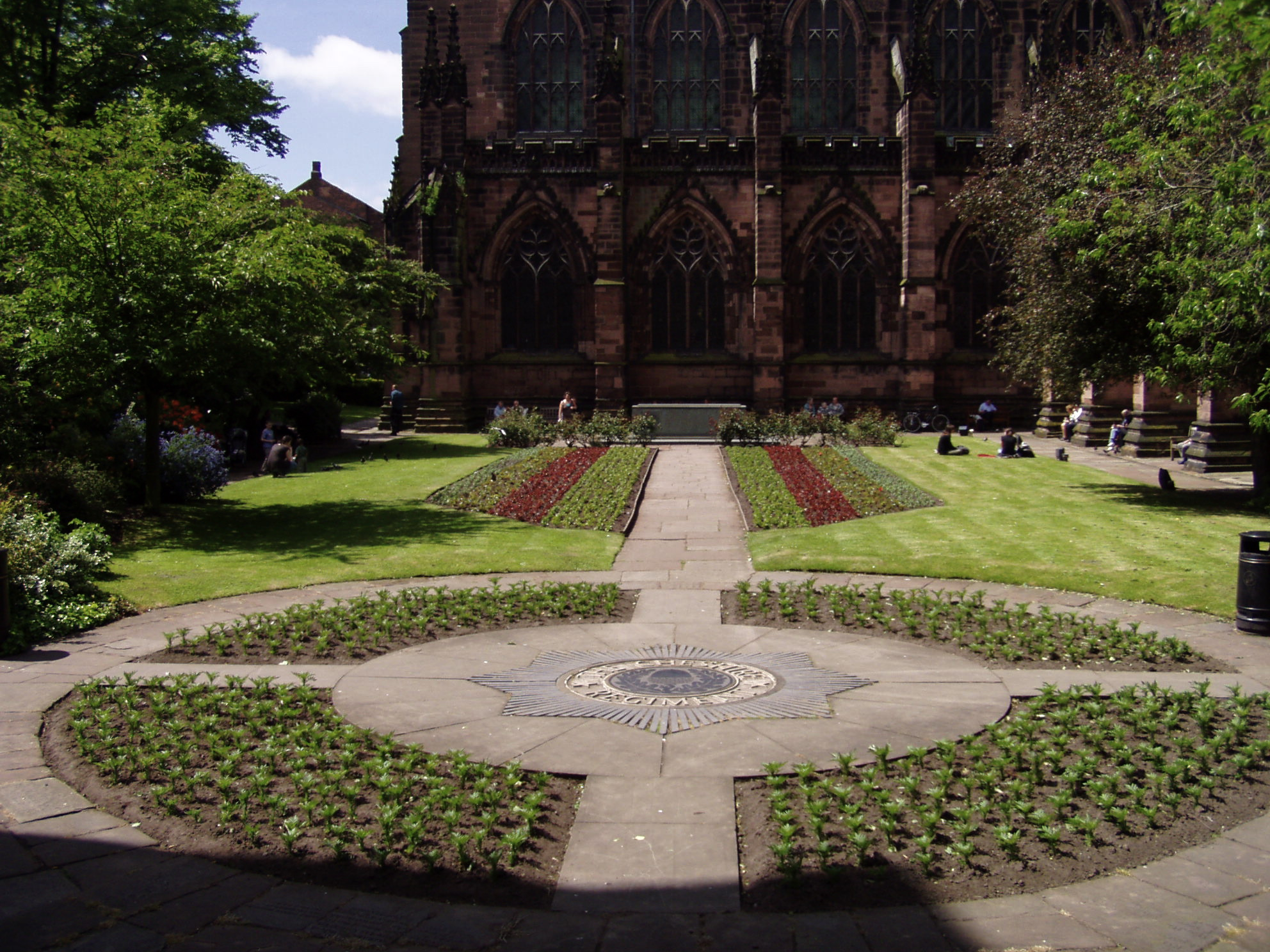
The Cheshire Regiment Memorial Garden

=== Bell tower ===
Towards the end of 1963 the cathedral bells, which were housed in the central tower, were in need of an overhaul and ringing was suspended. In 1965 the Dean asked George Pace, architect to York Minster, to prepare specifications for a new bell frame and for electrification of the clock and tolling mechanism. Due to structural difficulties and the cost of replacing the bells in the central tower it was advised that consideration should be given to building a detached bell and clock tower in the southeast corner of the churchyard. It was decided to proceed with that plan, and in 1969 an announcement was made that the first detached cathedral bell tower was to be erected since the building of the campanile at Chichester Cathedral in the 15th century. In February 1969, nine of the ten bells in the central tower were removed to be recast by John Taylor & Co as a ring of twelve bells with a flat sixth. The new bells were cast in 1973. Work on the new bell-tower began in February 1973. Two old bells dating from 1606 and 1626 were left in the tower. On 26 February 1975 the bells were rung for the first time to celebrate the wedding of a member of the Grosvenor family. The official opening on 25 June 1975 was performed by the Duke of Gloucester. The belfry is known as the Dean Addleshaw Tower, after the dean of the cathedral responsible for its construction. The tower is built in concrete, faced with sandstone at its base. It is the first detached bell tower to be built for a cathedral in this country since the Reformation. Between the bell tower and the south transept is a garden in remembrance of the Cheshire Regiment (originally the 22nd Regiment of Foot).

== Fittings and glass ==
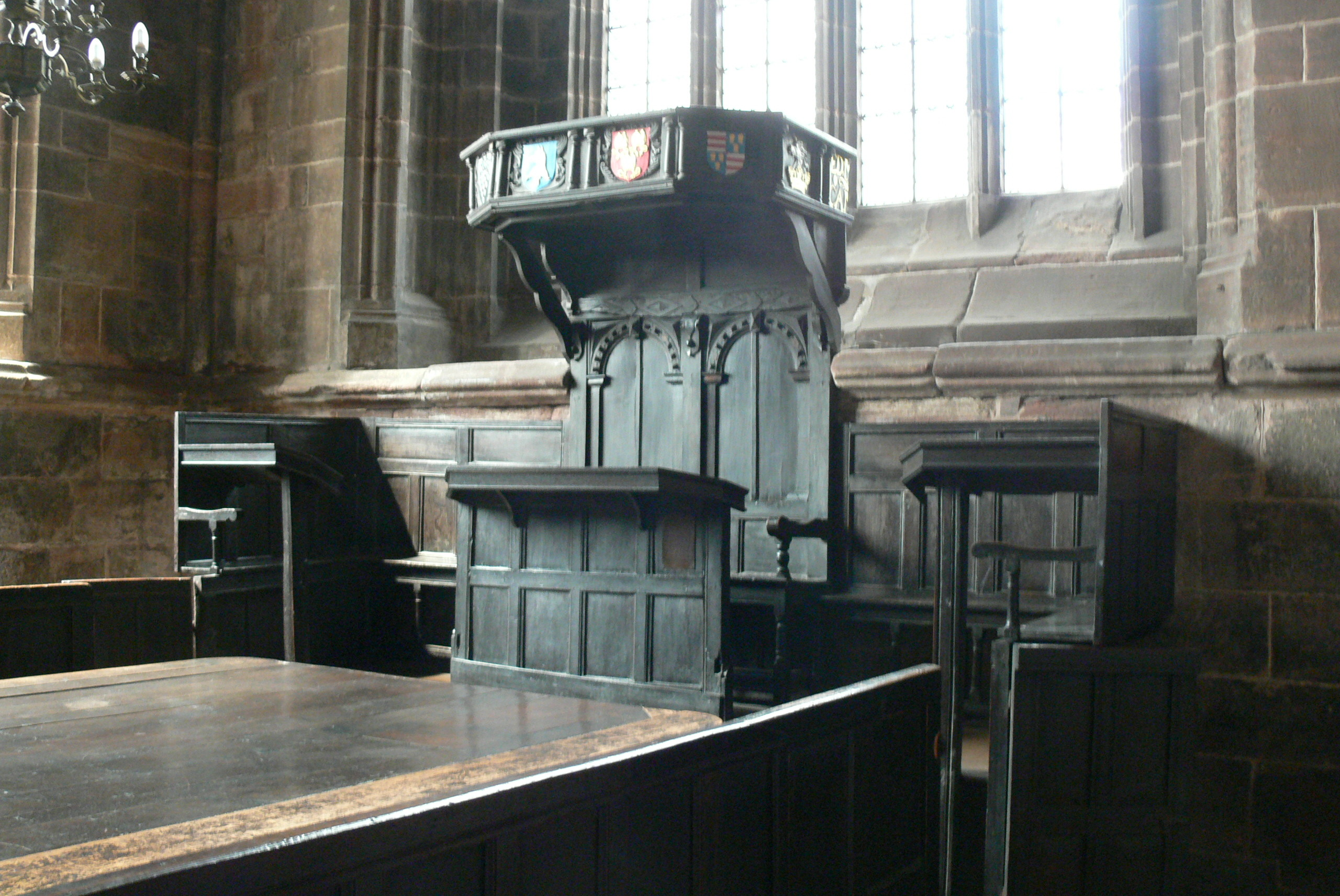
The Consistory Court of 1632

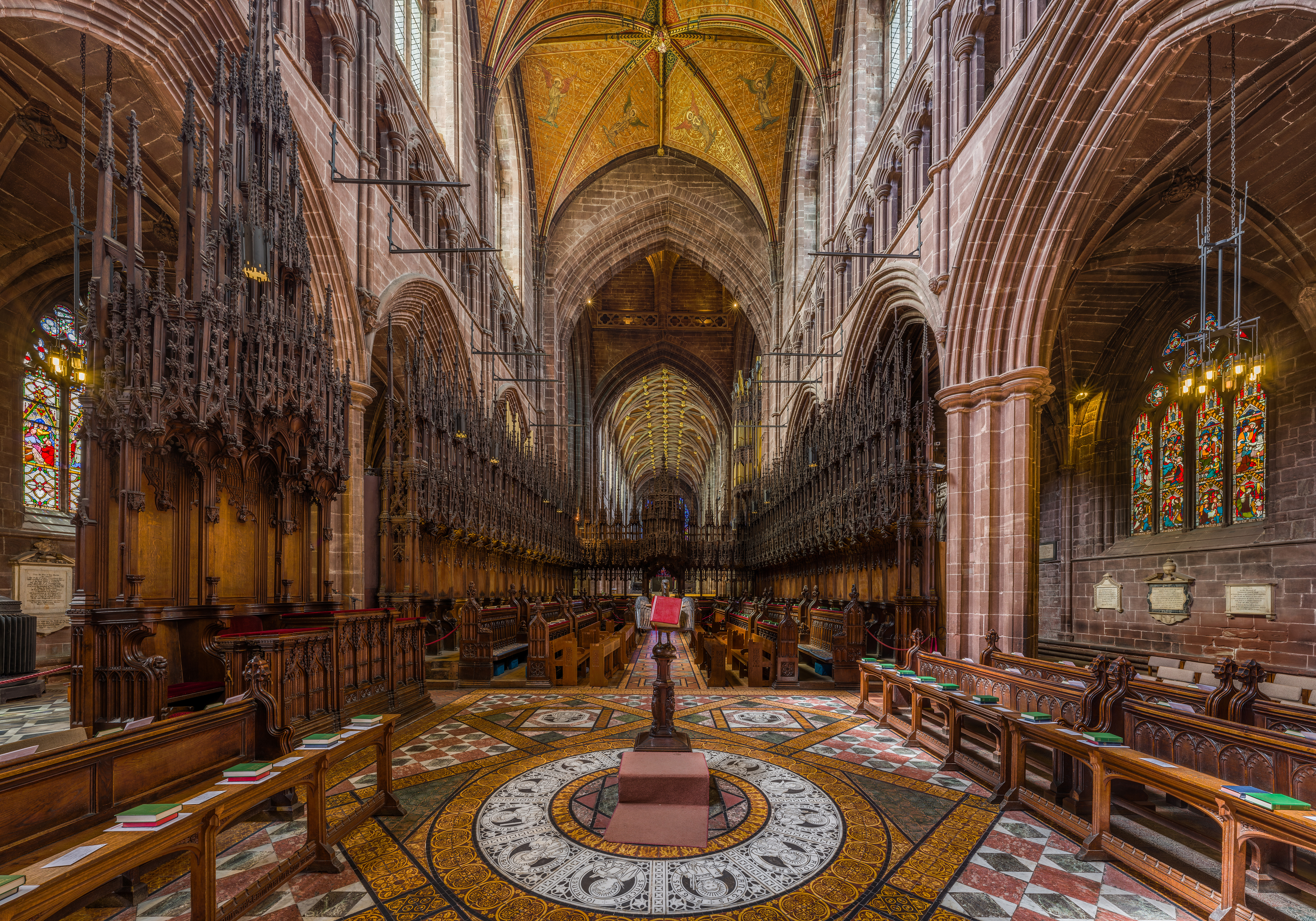
Choir Stalls (about 1380) and Rood Screen (late 19th century)

The treasures of Chester Cathedral are its rare fittings, specifically its choir stalls and the 17th-century furnishing of the bishop's Consistory Court in the south tower, which is a unique survival.

=== Choir stalls ===
The choir stalls date from about 1380. They have high, spiky, closely set canopies, with crocketed arches and spirelets. The stall ends have poppyheads and are rich with figurative carving. The stalls include 48 misericords, all but five of which are original, depicting a variety of subjects, some humorous and some grotesque. Pevsner states that they are "one of the finest sets in the country", while Alec Clifton-Taylor calls them "exquisite" and says of the misericords that "for delicacy and grace they surpass even those at Lincoln and Beverley".

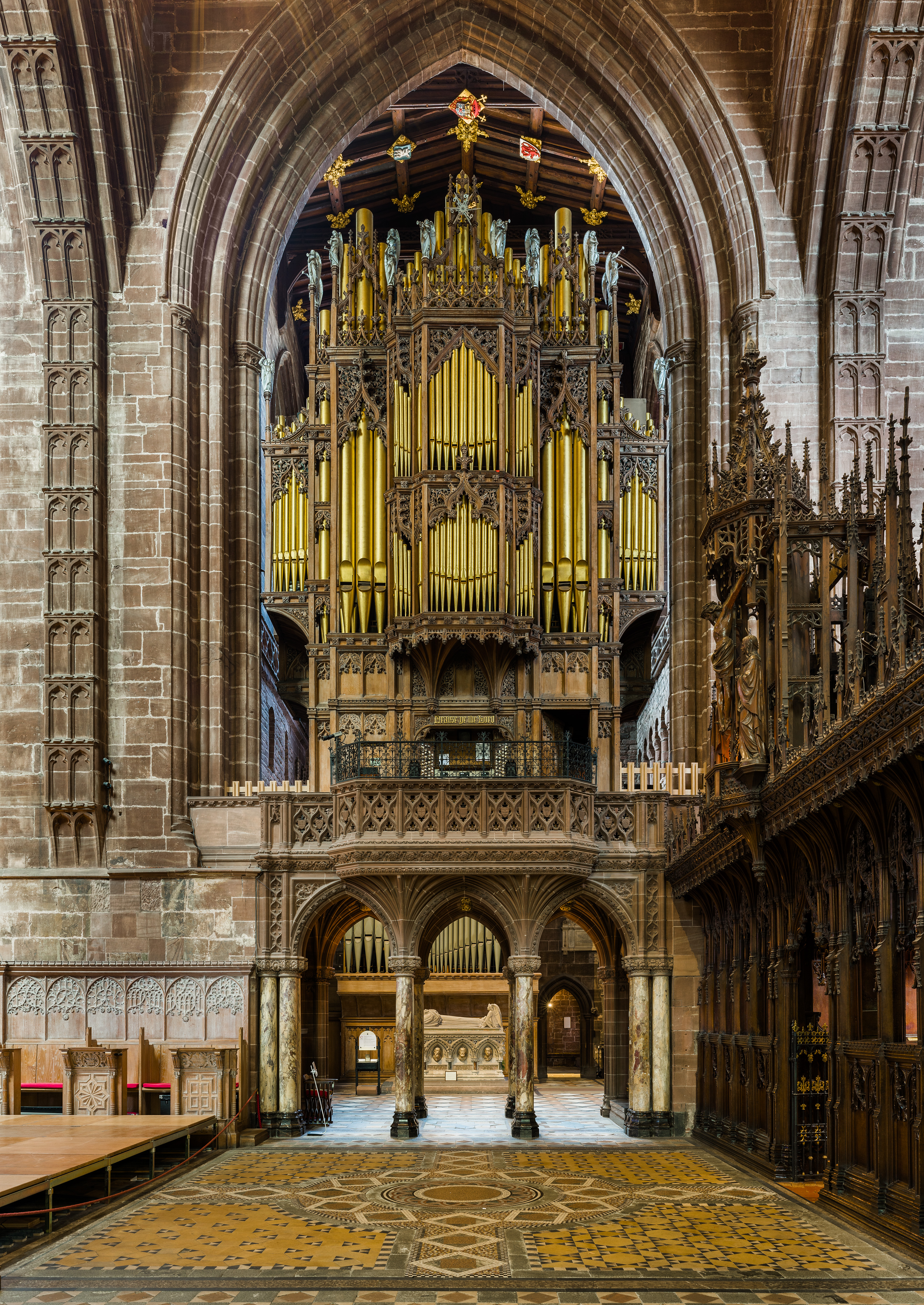
The organ of Chester Cathedral

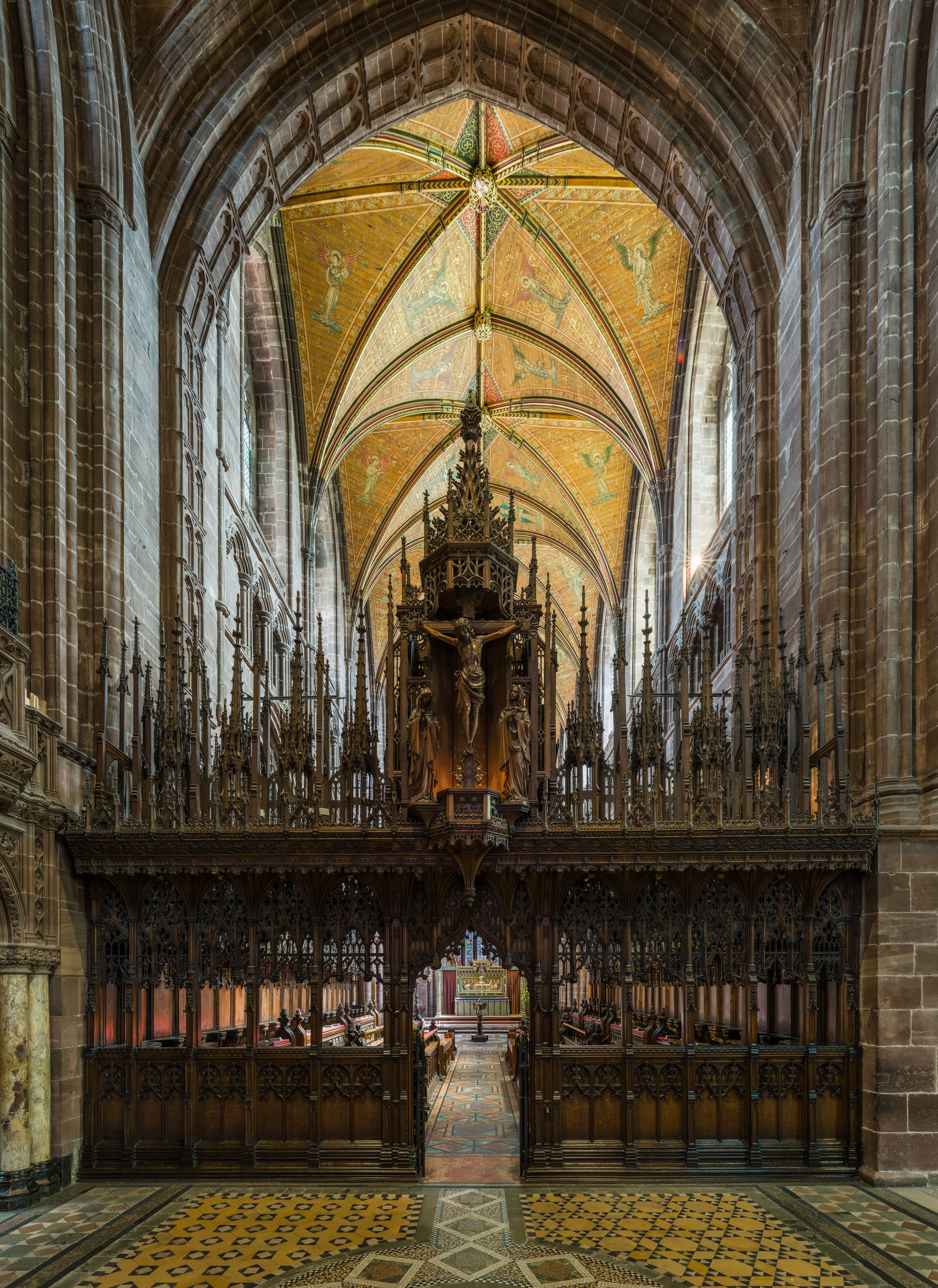
The Rood Screen

=== Organ ===
In 1844, an organ by Gray & Davison of London was installed in the cathedral, replacing an instrument with parts dating back to 1626. The organ was rebuilt and enlarged by Whiteley Bros of Chester in 1876, to include harmonic flutes and reeds by Cavaillé-Coll. It was later moved to its present position at the front of the north transept. In 1910 William Hill and Son of London extensively rebuilt and revoiced the organ, replacing the Cavaillé-Coll reeds with new pipes of their own. The choir division of the organ was enlarged and moved behind the choirstalls on the south side. The instrument was again overhauled by Rushworth and Dreaper of Liverpool in 1969, when a new mechanism and some new pipework made to a design by the organist, Roger Fisher, was installed. Since 1991 the organ has been in the care of David Wells of Liverpool.

=== Turret clock ===
In 1725 Joseph Smith was commissioned to make a new turret clock. The clock had no dial, but chimed the quarters with a ting-tang on two bells and struck the hour. The pendulum period was 1¼ seconds. As part of this commission he was paid 16s annually (equivalent to £143 in 2025) for its maintenance.

The clock survived until 1873 when it was replaced by a new mechanism by J. B. Joyce & Co of Whitchurch. In the 1970s, the clock mechanism was moved to the Addleshaw Tower.

=== Stained glass ===
See Gallery below

Chester suffered badly at the hands of the Parliamentary troops. As a consequence, its stained glass dates mainly from the 19th and 20th centuries and has representative examples of the significant trends in stained glass design from the 1850s onwards. Of the earlier Victorian firms, William Wailes is the best represented, in the south aisle (1862), as well as Hardman & Co. and Michael O'Connor. Glass from the High Victorian period is well represented by two leading London firms, Clayton and Bell and Heaton, Butler and Bayne. The Aesthetic style is represented by Charles Eamer Kempe. Early 20th century windows include several commemorating those who died in World War I.

There are also several notable modern windows, the most recent being the refectory window of 2001 by Ros Grimshaw which depicts the Creation. The eight-light Perpendicular window of the west end contains mid-20th century glass representing the Holy Family and Saints, by W. T. Carter Shapland. Three modern windows in the south aisle, designed and made by Alan Younger to replace windows damaged in the Second World War. They were donated by the 6th Duke of Westminster to celebrate the 900th anniversary of the cathedral and contain the dates 1092 and 1992 to reflect the theme of "continuity and change".

== Features ==
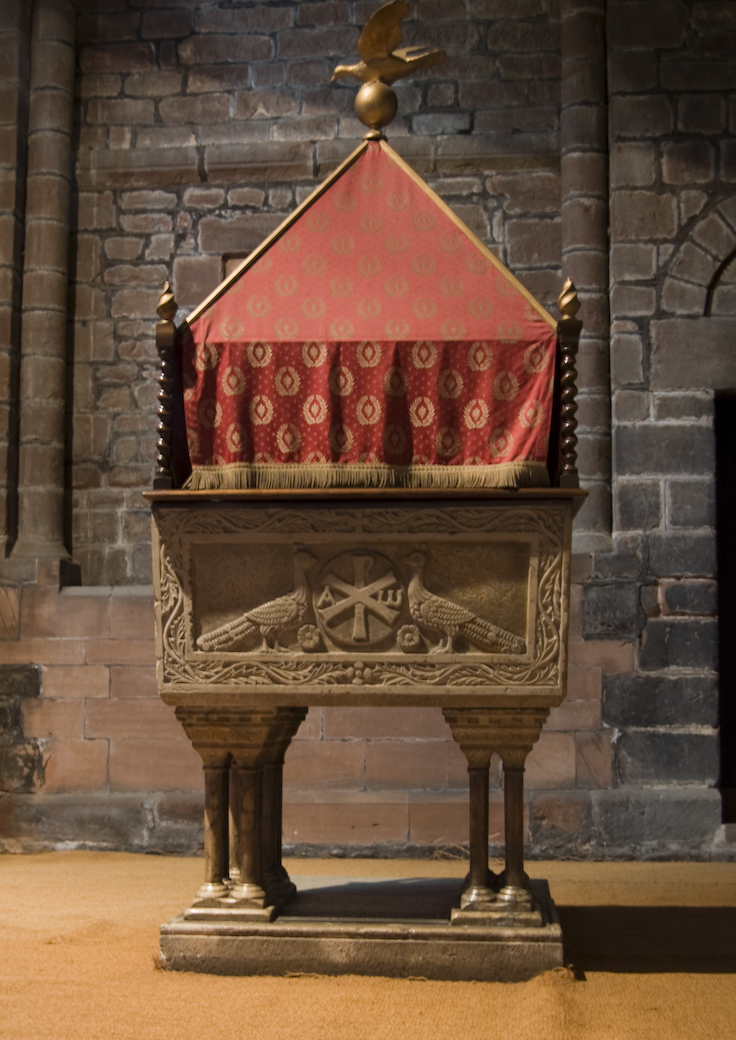
The font at the end of the north aisle

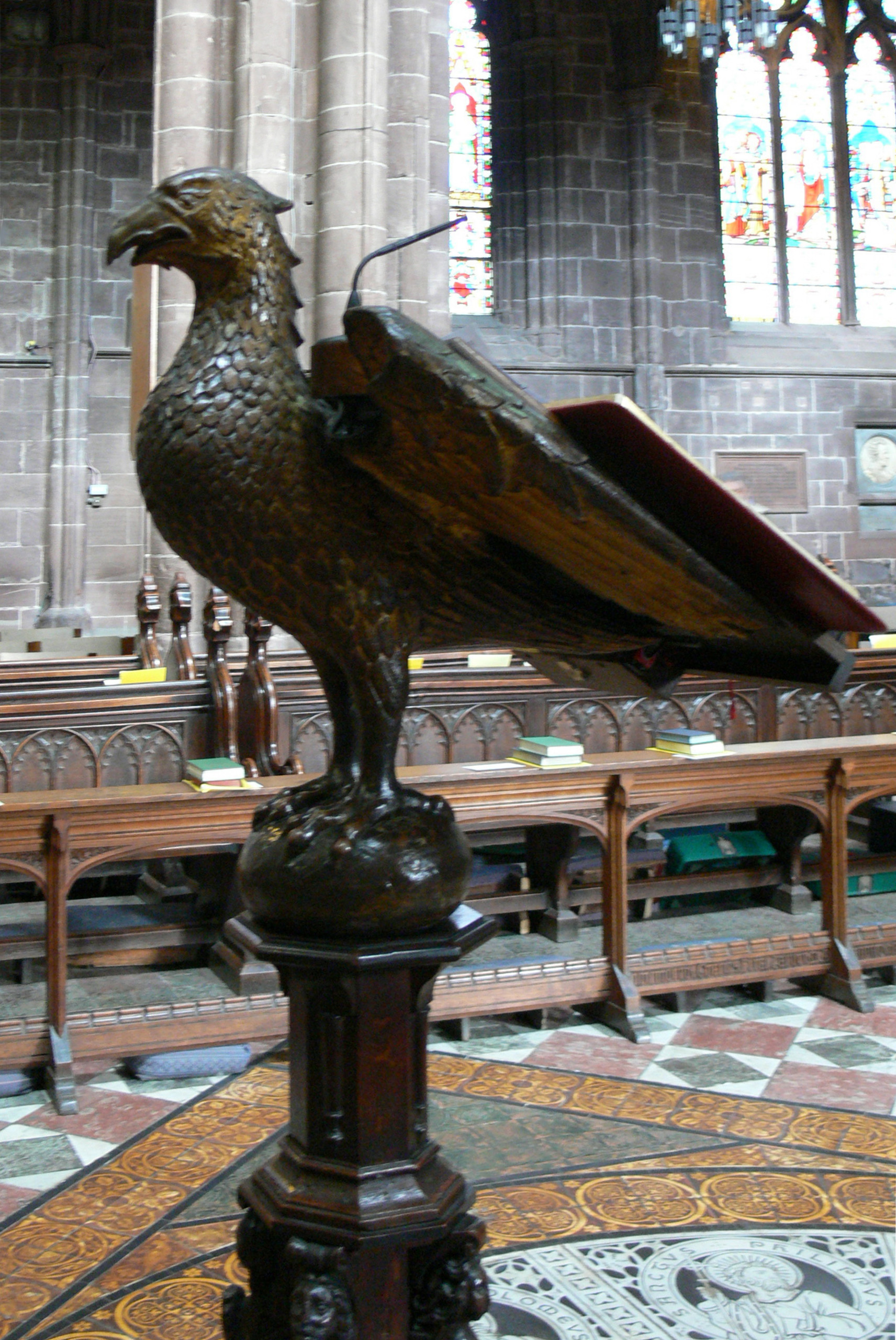
The quire lectern and tiled floor

=== Nave ===
The west end of the nave is dominated by an eight-light window in the Perpendicular Gothic style which almost fills the upper part of the west wall. It contains stained glass designed by W. T. Carter Shapland dating from 1961 and depicts the Holy Family in the middle two lights, flanked by the northern saints Werburgh, Oswald, Aidan, Chad and Wilfrid, and Queen Ethelfleda.

The stone nave pulpit was designed by the restorer R. C. Hussey and the lectern, dated 1876, is by Skidmore. The mosaic floor of the tower bay was designed by John Howson (Dean, 1867–1885) and executed by Burke and Co. The same firm installed the mosaics which decorate the wall of the north aisle, depicting the patriarchs and prophets Abraham, Moses, David and Elijah. They were designed by J. R. Clayton of Clayton and Bell, and date from 1883 to 1886.

Monuments in the nave include those to Roger Barnston, dated 1838, by John Blayney, to Nicholas Stratford (Bishop, 1689–1707), dated 1708, to George Hall (Bishop, 1662–1668 (d.)), to Edmund Entwistle, dated 1712, to John and Thomas Wainwright who died respectively in 1686 and 1720, to Robert Bickerstaff who died in 1841 by Blayney, to William Smith (Dean, 1758–1787 (d.)) by Thomas Banks, and to William Mainwaring, dated 1671.

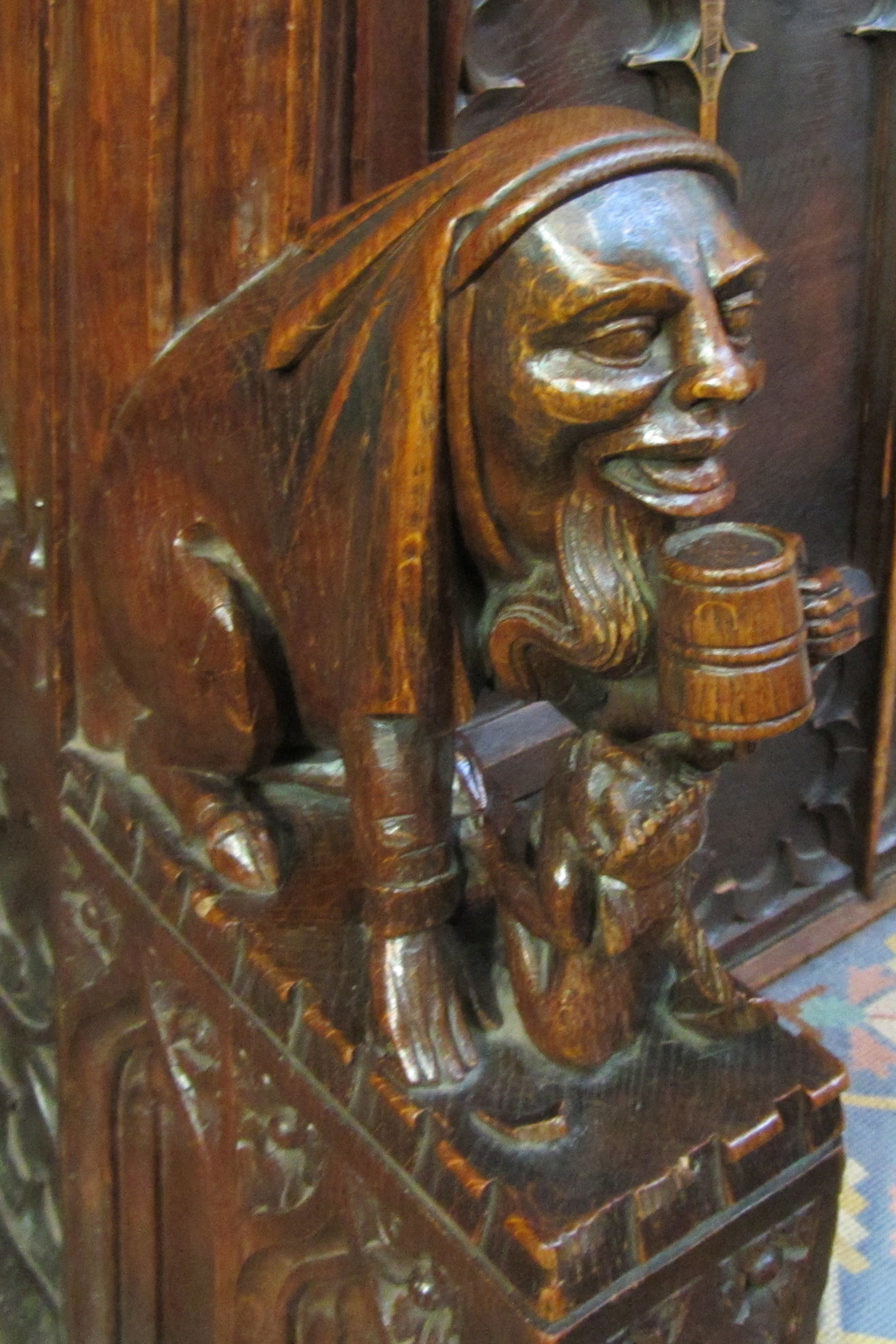
A beer-swilling man with the rear end of a pig

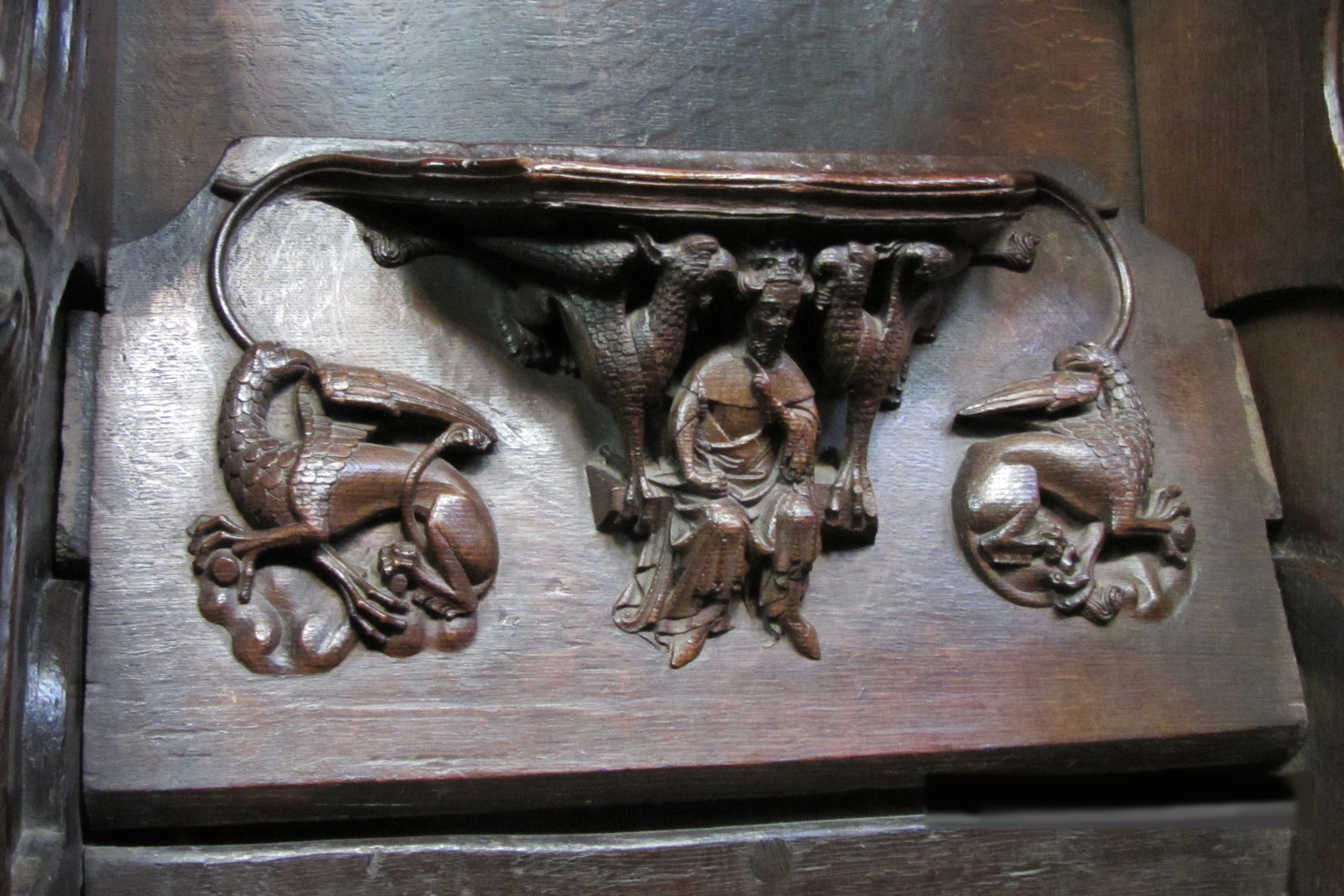
A misericord showing Alexander the Great being carried Heavenwards by griffons

=== Quire ===
The most famous feature of the quire is the set of choir stalls, dating from about 1380, and described above. The lectern, in the form of a wooden eagle, symbol of John the Evangelist, dates from the first half of the 17th century. The candlesticks also date from the 17th century and are by Censore of Bologna who died in 1662.

With these exceptions, most of the decoration and the fittings of the quire date from the 19th century and are in keeping with the Gothic Revival promoted by the Oxford Movement and Augustus Welby Pugin. The restored vault of the quire is typical of the period, having been designed by Scott and decorated and gilded by Clayton and Bell.

The quire is entered through a screen designed by George Gilbert Scott, with gates made by Skidmore. The rood was designed by Scott, and was made by F. Stuflesser. The bishop's throne or "cathedra" was designed by Scott to complement the choir stalls. It was constructed by Farmer and Brindley in 1876. The reredos and the floor mosaic date from 1876, and were designed by J. R. Clayton. The east window has tracery of an elegant Decorated Gothic design which is filled with stained glass of 1884 by Heaton, Butler and Bayne.

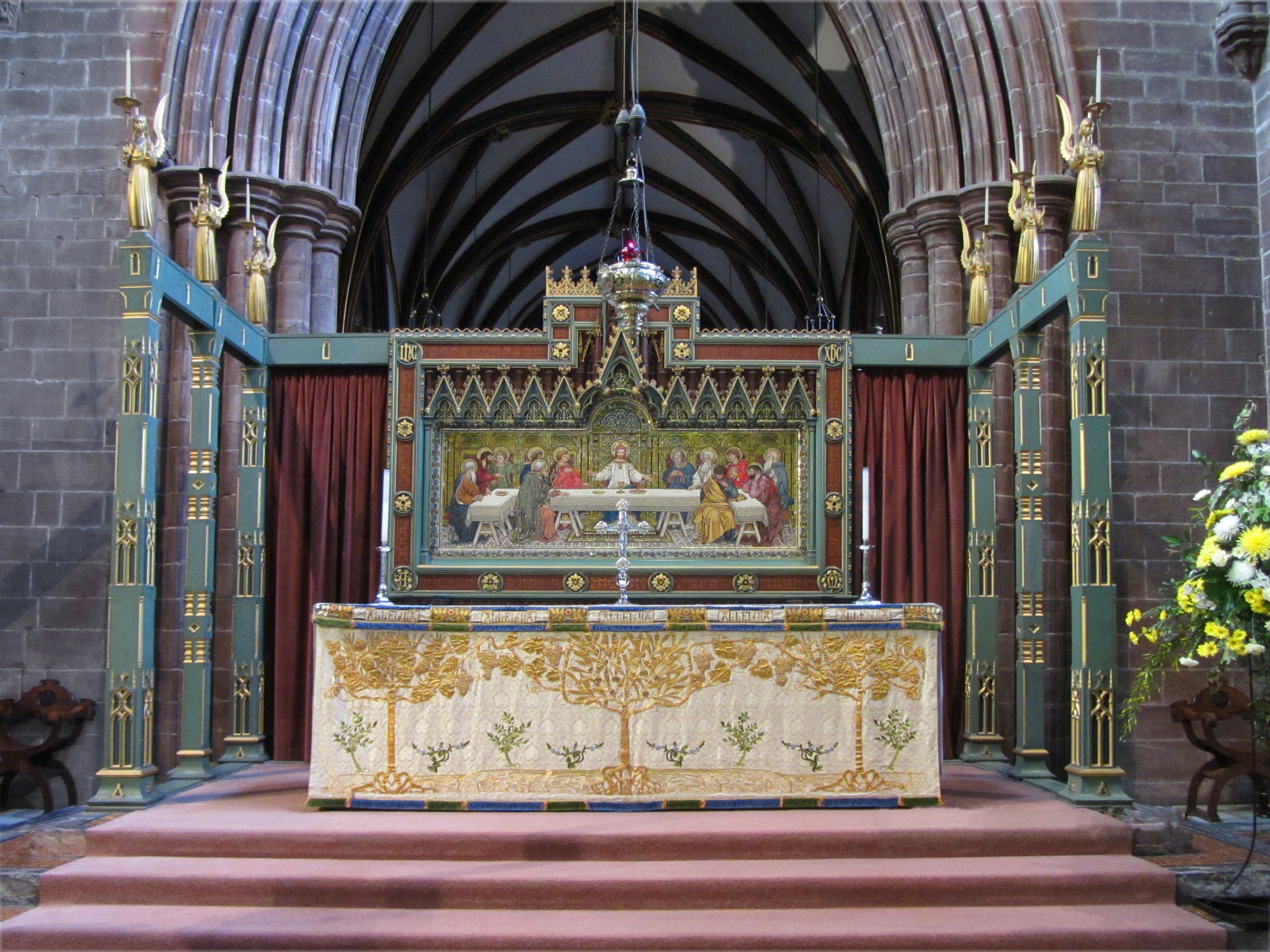
The Chancel – the High Altar has a reredos by J.R. Clayton of Clayton and Bell, and a seasonal altar frontal in the Art Nouveau style.

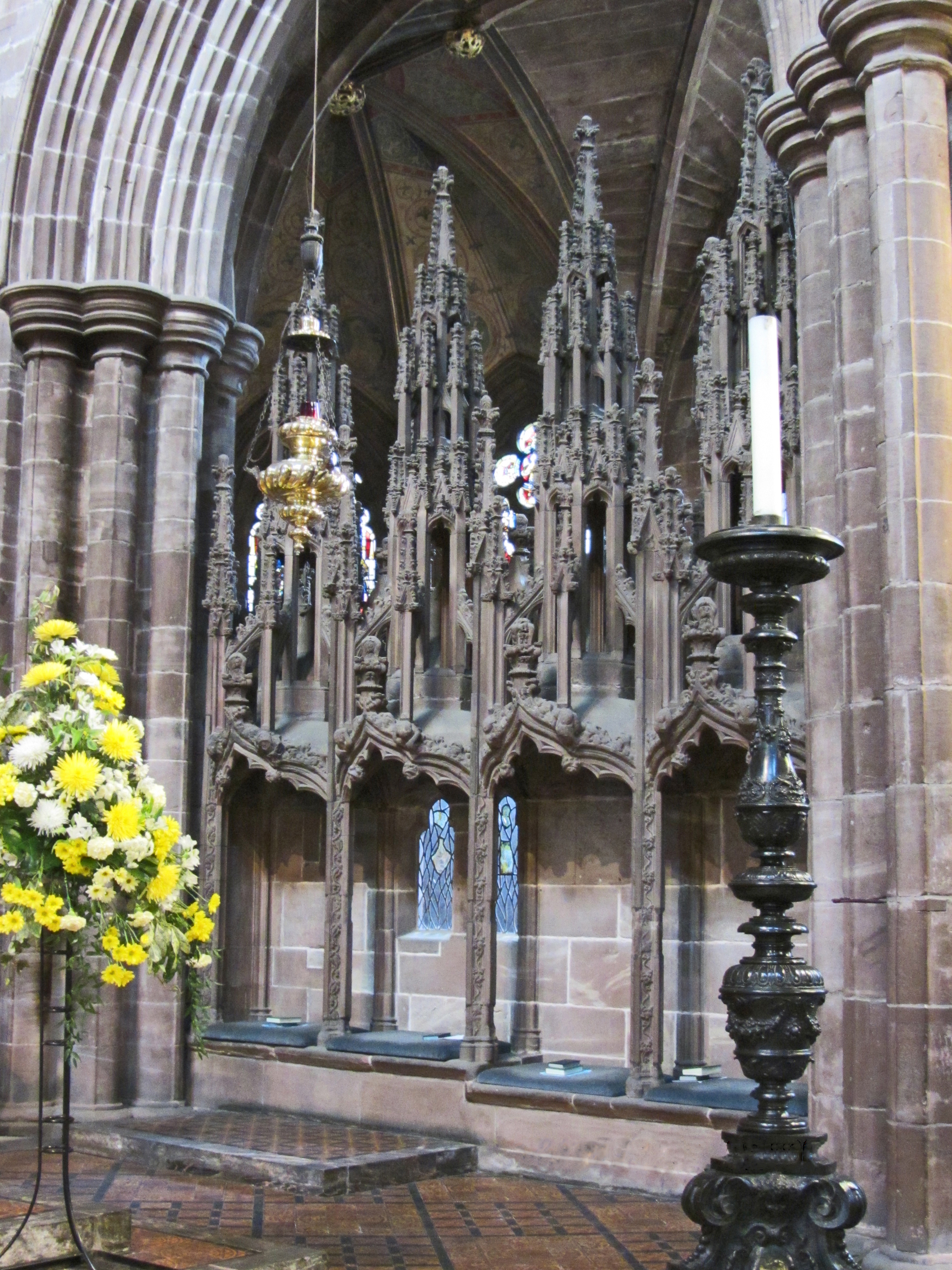
Sedilia and one of a pair of candlesticks in the quire

=== Lady Chapel ===
The 13th-century Lady Chapel contains the stone shrine of Saint Werburgh which dates from the 14th century and which used to contain her relics. The shrine, of similar red sandstone as the cathedral, has a base pierced with deep niches. The upper part takes the form of a miniature chapel containing statuettes. During the Dissolution of the Monasteries it was dismantled. Some of the parts were found during the 1873 restoration of the cathedral and the shrine was reassembled in 1888 by Blomfield. A carving of St Werburgh by Joseph Pyrz was added in 1993. Also in the chapel are a sedilia and a piscina. The stained glass of 1859, is by William Wailes. The chapel contains a monument to Archdeacon Francis Wrangham, made by Hardman & Co. and dating from 1846. In 1555, George Marsh, Protestant martyr stood trial here accused of heresy.

=== North quire aisle ===
The north quire aisle has a stone screen by R. C. Hussey and an iron gate dated 1558 that came from Guadalajara. At the east end of the aisle is the chapel of St Werburgh which has a vault of two bays, and an east window depicting the Nativity by Michael O'Connor, dated 1857. Other stained glass windows in the north aisle are by William Wailes, by Heaton, Butler and Bayne, and by Clayton and Bell. The chapel contains a piscina dating from the 14th century, and monuments to John Graham (Bishop, 1848–1865) dated 1867, and to William Bispham who died in 1685, Other monuments in the north aisle include a tablet to William Jacobson (Bishop, 1865–1884), dated 1887, by Boehm to a design by Blomfield.

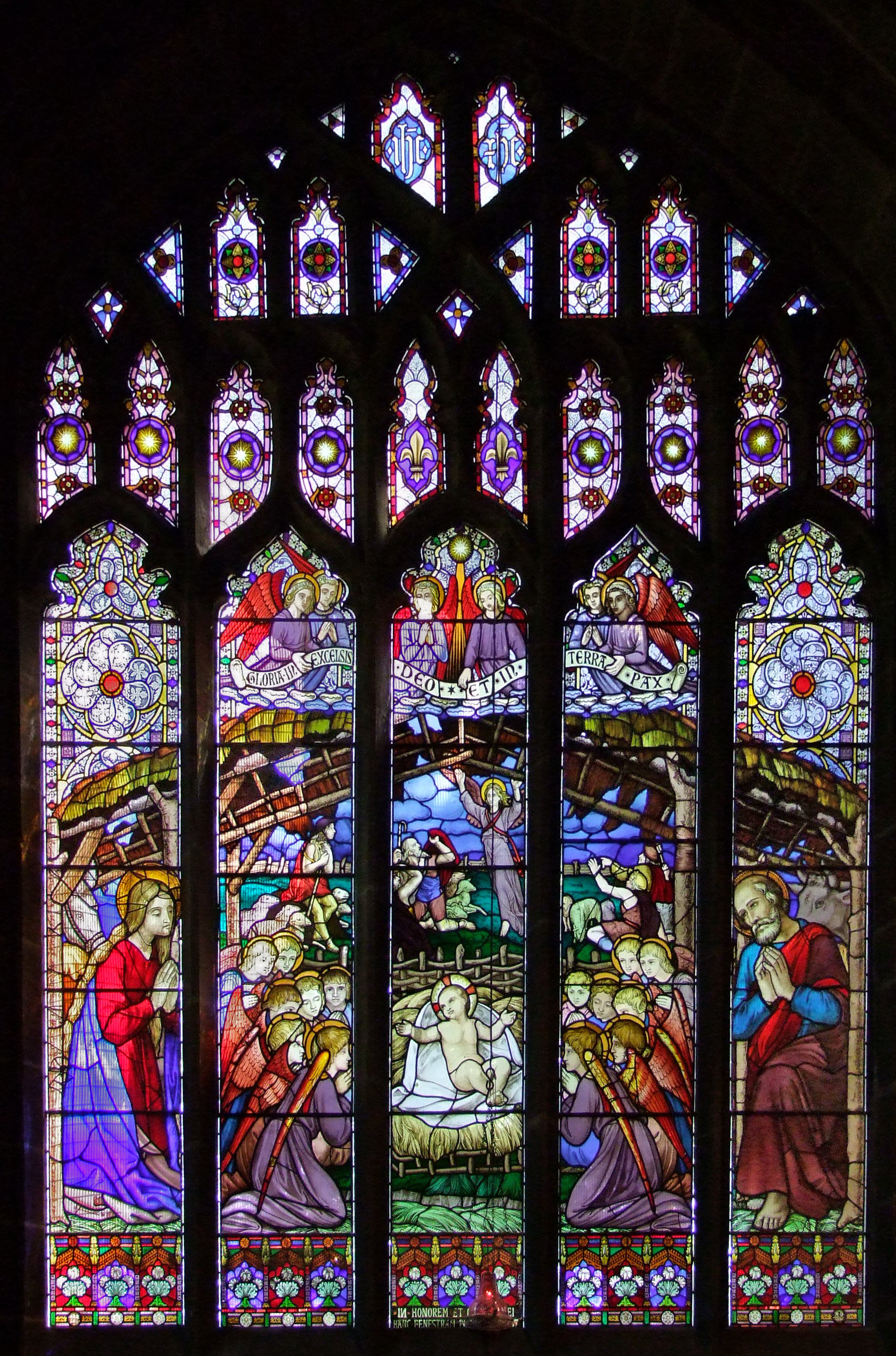
The Nativity Window in the Chapel of St Werburgh, by Michael O'Connor (1853)

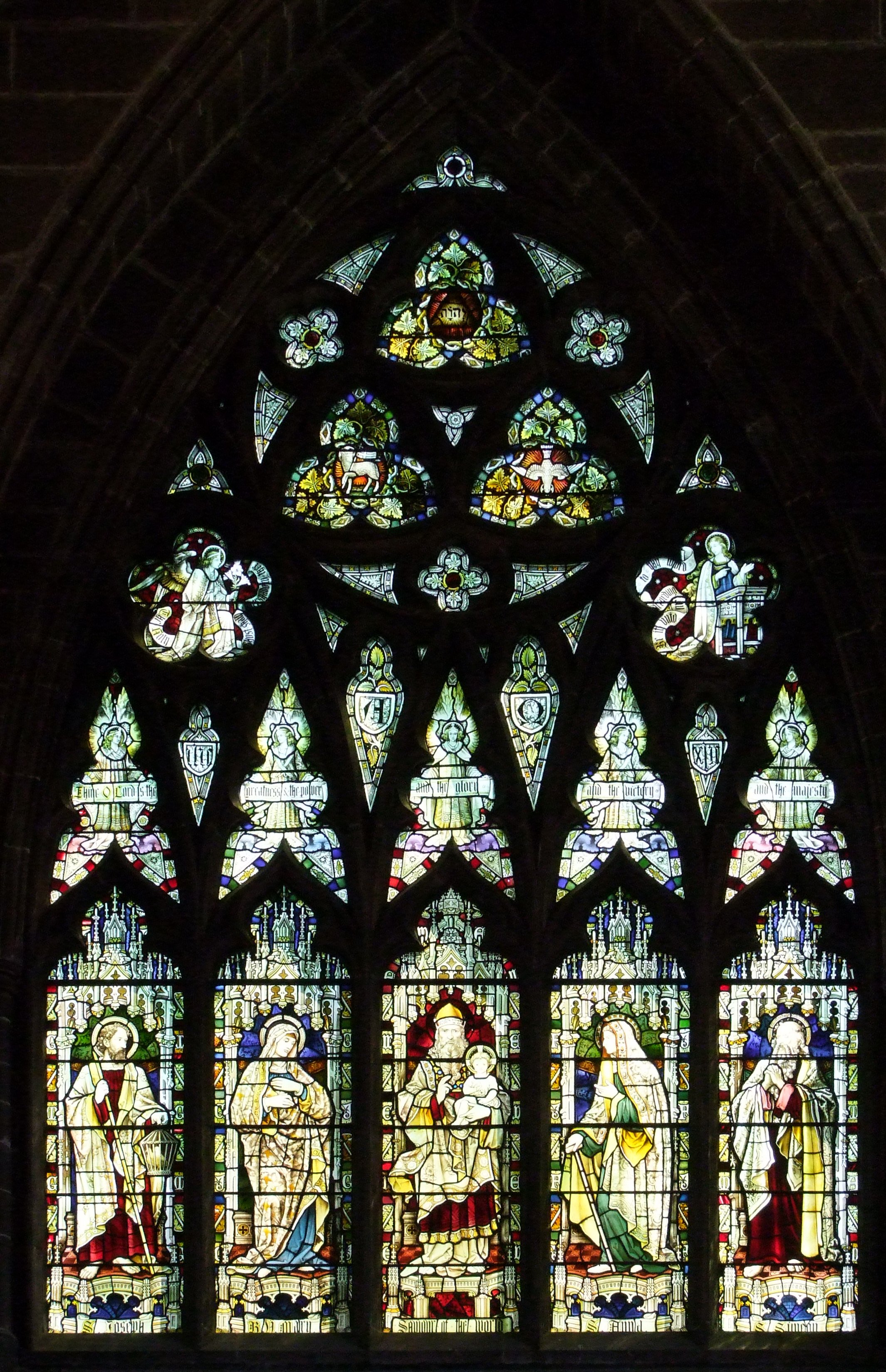
The chancel window by Heaton, Butler and Bayne (1884)

=== North transept, sacristy and chapter house ===
The small Norman transept has clerestory windows containing stained glass by William Wailes, installed in 1853. The sacristy, of 1200, has an east window depicting St Anselm, and designed by A. K. Nicholson. In the north transept is a freestanding tomb chest monument to John Pearson who died in 1686, designed by Arthur Blomfield and carved by Nicholas Earp, with a recumbent effigy by Matthew Noble. Other monuments in the transept include one to Samuel Peploe, dating from about 1784, by Joseph Nollekens. The wall monuments include cenotaphs to members of the Cheshire (Earl of Chester's) Yeomanry killed in the Boer War and in the First and Second World Wars. At the corner of the transept with the north aisle is a 17th-century Tree of Jesse carved in whale ivory. A niche contains a rare example of a "cobweb picture", painted on the web of a caterpillar. Originating in the Austrian Tyrol, it depicts Mary and the Christ-Child, and is based on a painting by Lucas Cranach the Elder.

The chapter house has stained glass in its east window by Heaton, Butler and Bayne and grisaille windows in the north and south walls, dated 1882–83, by Blomfield. It contains an oak cope cupboard from the late 13th century. The front of the chapter house was rebuilt to a design by Hussey.

=== South choir aisle ===
The south aisle was shortened in about 1870 by Scott, and given an apsidal east end, becoming the chapel of St Erasmus. The stained glass in the apse window is dated 1872 and is by Clayton and Bell. Below this is a mosaic designed by J. R. Clayton and made by Salviati, and a fresco painting by Clayton and Bell, dated 1874. Elsewhere the stained glass in the aisle is by Wailes, and by Hardman & Co. to a design by Pugin. The aisle contains the tomb of Ranulf Higdon, a monk at St Werburgh's Abbey in the 12th century who wrote a major work of history entitled Polychronicon, a monument to Thomas Brassey (a civil engineering contractor who died in 1870), designed by Blomfield and made by Wagmuller, a monument to Samuel Peploe (Bishop, 1726–1752) who died in 1752, and three painted monuments by a member of the Randle Holme family.

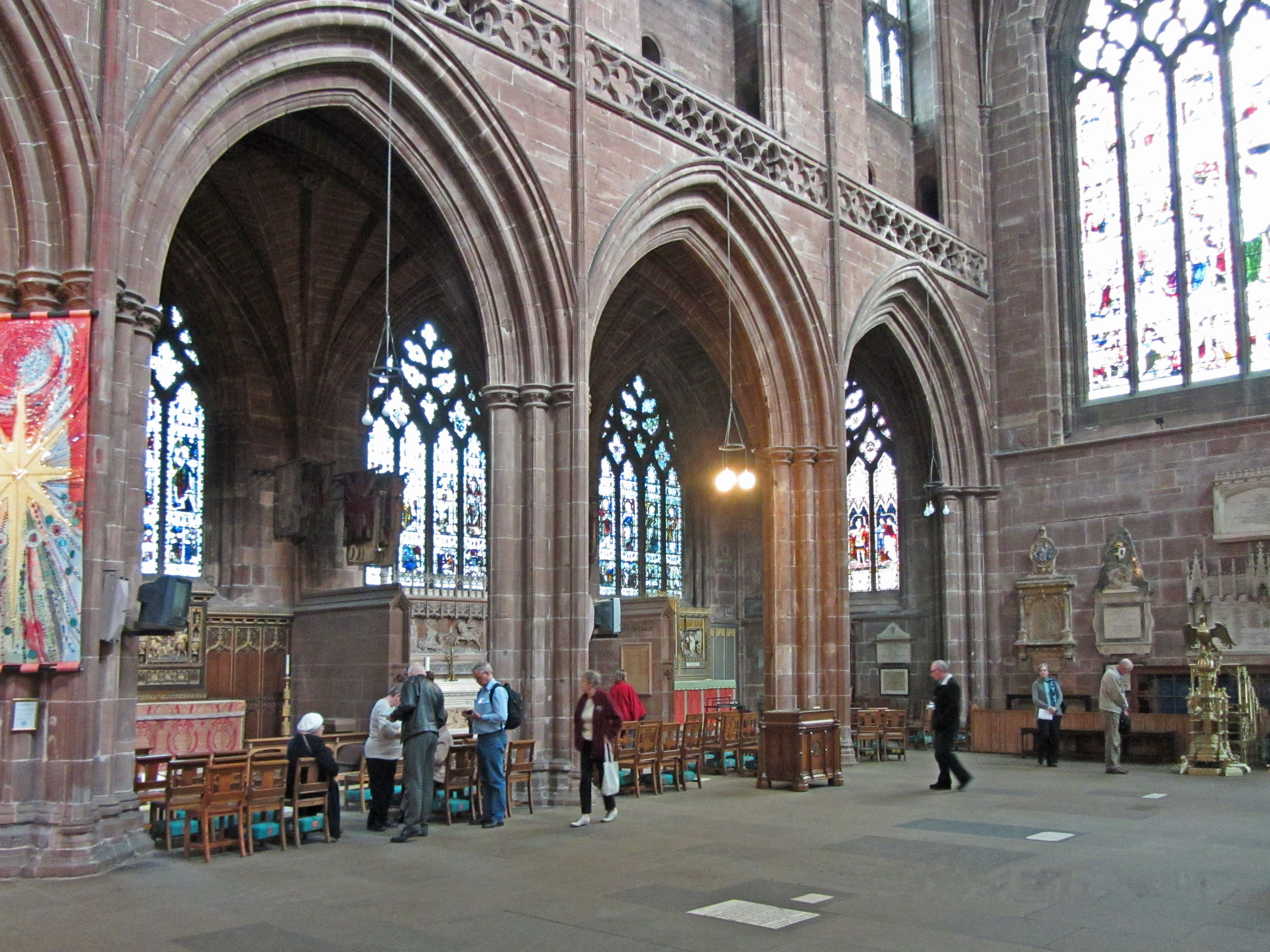
The south transept has window tracery in the Flowing Decorated style.

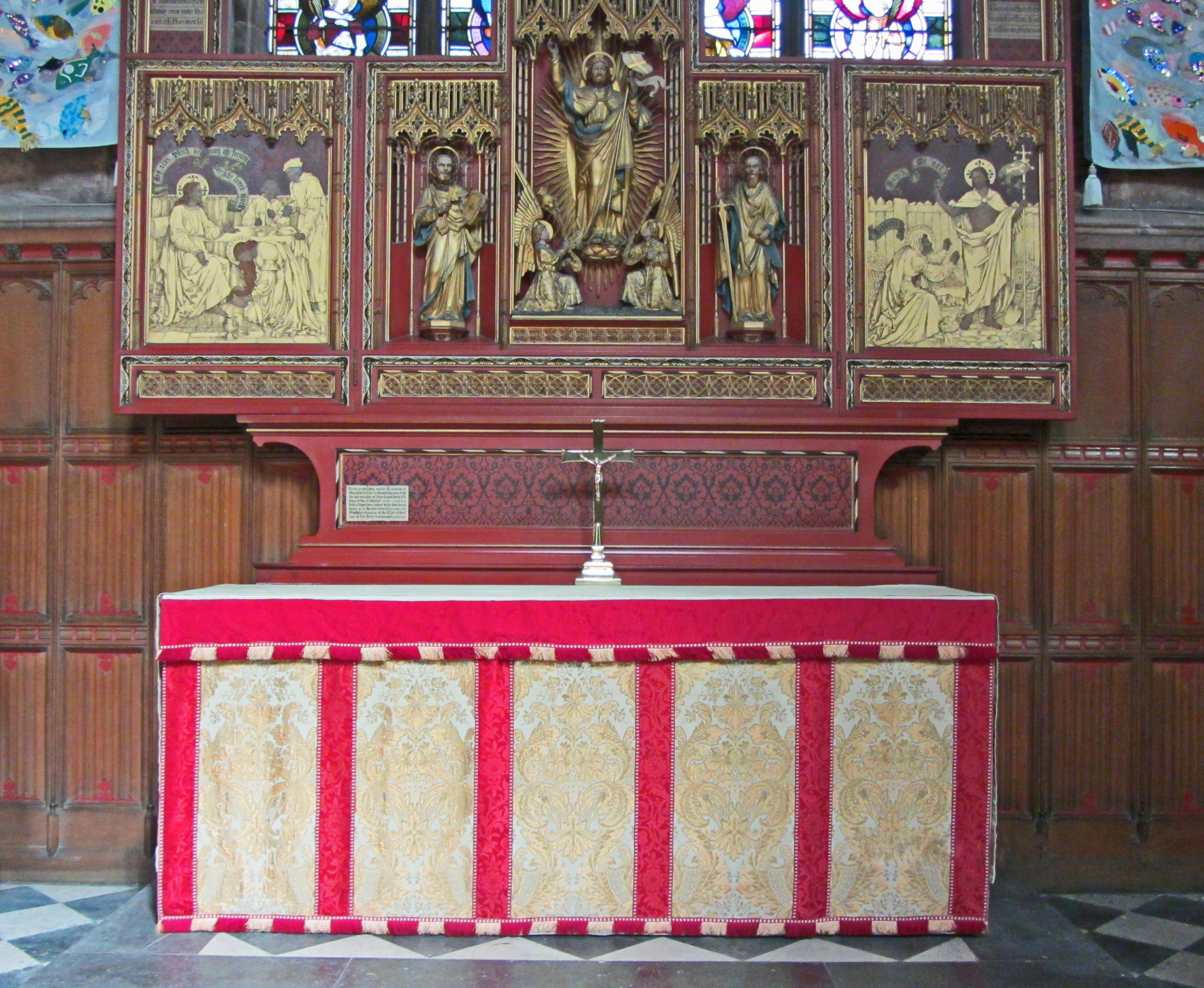
Altar in the south transept with a reredos depicting scenes of Mary of Bethany

=== South transept ===
The south transept, formerly the parish church of St Oswald contains a piscina and sedilia in the south wall. On the east wall are four chapels, each with a reredos, two of which were designed by Giles Gilbert Scott, one by Kempe and the other by his successor, W. E. Tower. The south window is dated 1887 and was made by Heaton, Butler and Bayne to a design by R. C. Hussey. Other stained glass in the transept is by Clayton and Bell, by C. E. Kempe and by Powell.

The monuments include those to George Ogden who died in 1781, by Hayward, to Anne Matthews who died in 1793, by Thomas Banks, to John Philips Buchanan who died at Waterloo in 1815, to the first Duke of Westminster, designed by C. J. Blomfield, and two memorial plaques to members of the Egerton family. On the wall of the southwest crossing pier are monuments which include a cenotaph to the casualties in HMS Chester in the Battle of Jutland in 1916 who included the 16-year-old John Cornwell VC. The west wall of the south transept has many memorials, including war memorial cenotaphs to the Cheshire Regiment, the Royal Air Force and the Free Czech Forces.

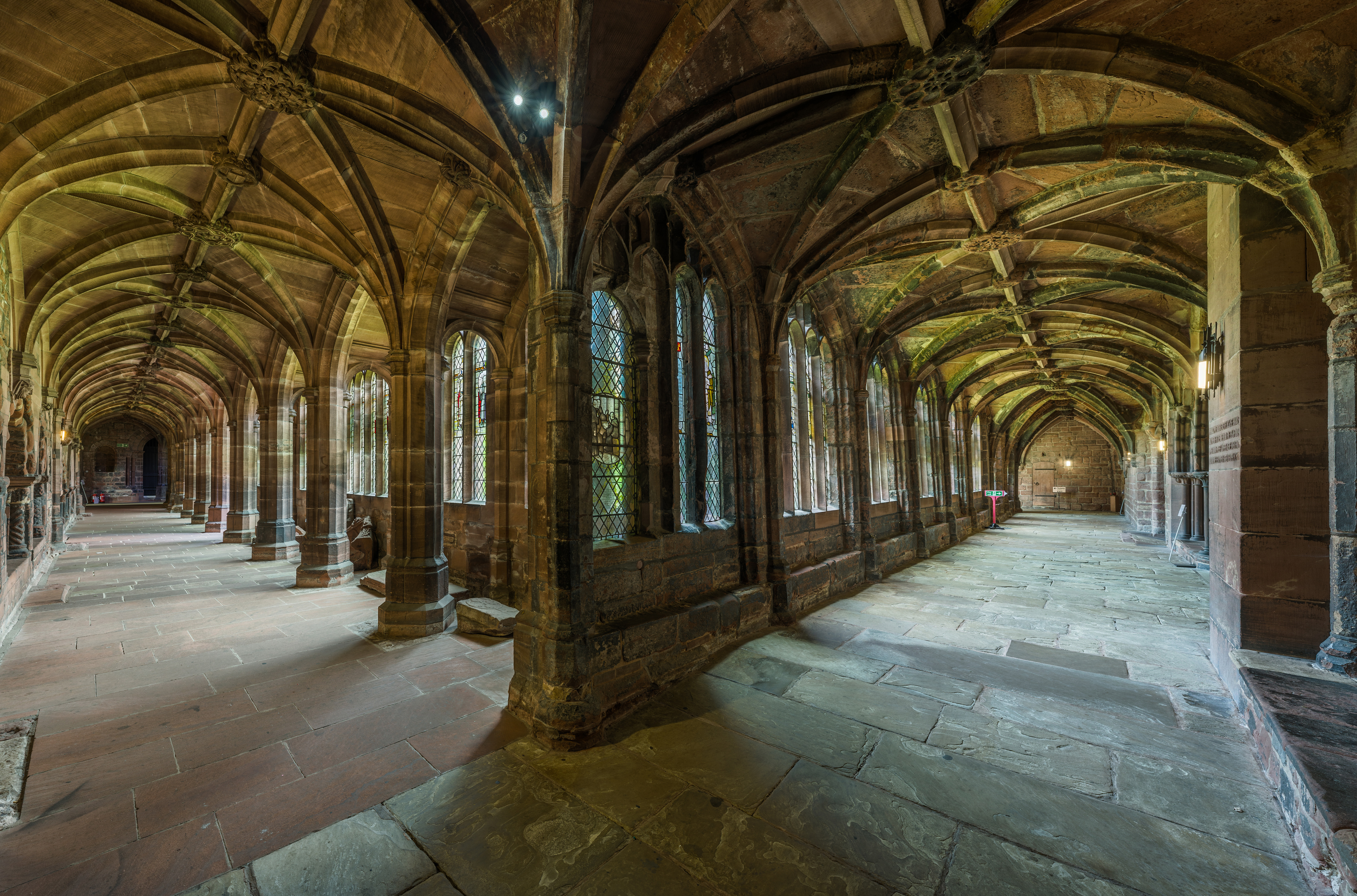
The Cloisters

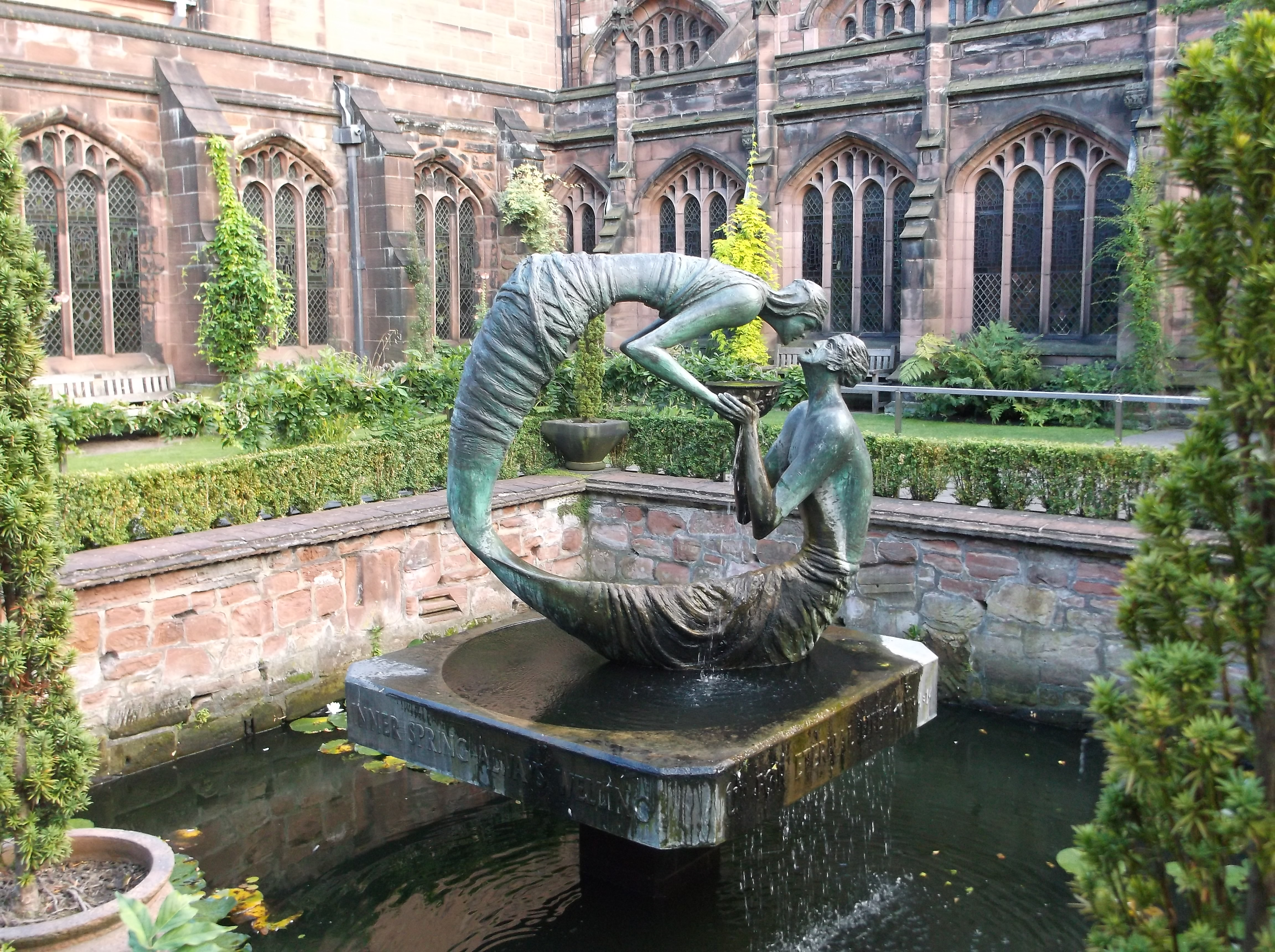
The Water of Life by Stephen Broadbent

=== Cloisters and refectory ===
The cloisters were restored in the 20th century, and the stained glass windows contain the images of some 130 saints. The cloister garth contains a modern sculpture entitled The water of life by Stephen Broadbent. The refectory roof is dated 1939 and was designed by F. H. Crossley. The east window with reticulated tracery was designed by Giles Gilbert Scott and is dated 1913. The stained glass in the west window, depicting the Creation, was designed by Ros Grimshaw and installed in 2001 to celebrate the Millennium. On the refectory's west wall there is a tapestry depicting Elymas being struck with blindness which was woven at the Mortlake Tapestry Works in the 17th century from one of the Raphael Cartoons. The heraldic paintings on the north wall represent the arms of the Earls of Chester.

=== Library ===
A library has been present since the time of St Werburgh's Abbey, and following the dissolution of the monasteries it became the cathedral library. It continued to grow over the centuries, but by the 19th century it had become neglected. Between 1867 and 1885 it was enlarged and in the 1890s new bookcases were added. A further reorganisation took place in the 1920s but by the 1980s the contents were contained in five separate sites around the cathedral. A programme of repair and re-cataloguing of the contents was instituted. During the 2000s more work was carried out and the refurbished library, housed in three rooms, opened in 2007. The library is available for research and for organised visits by groups.

== Ministry ==
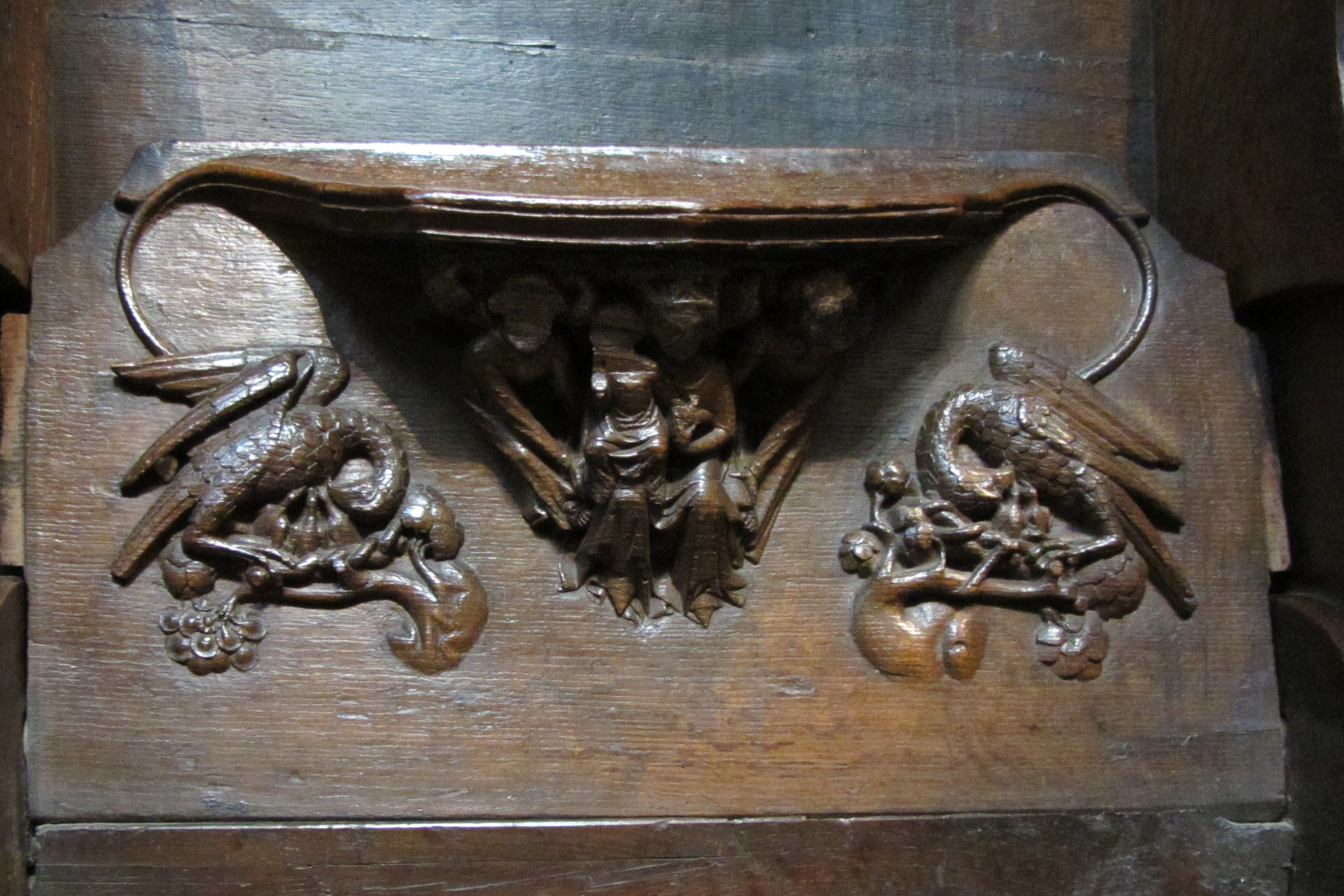
A defaced misericord showing the Virgin and Child framed by pelicans, symbols of Christ's love for the Church.

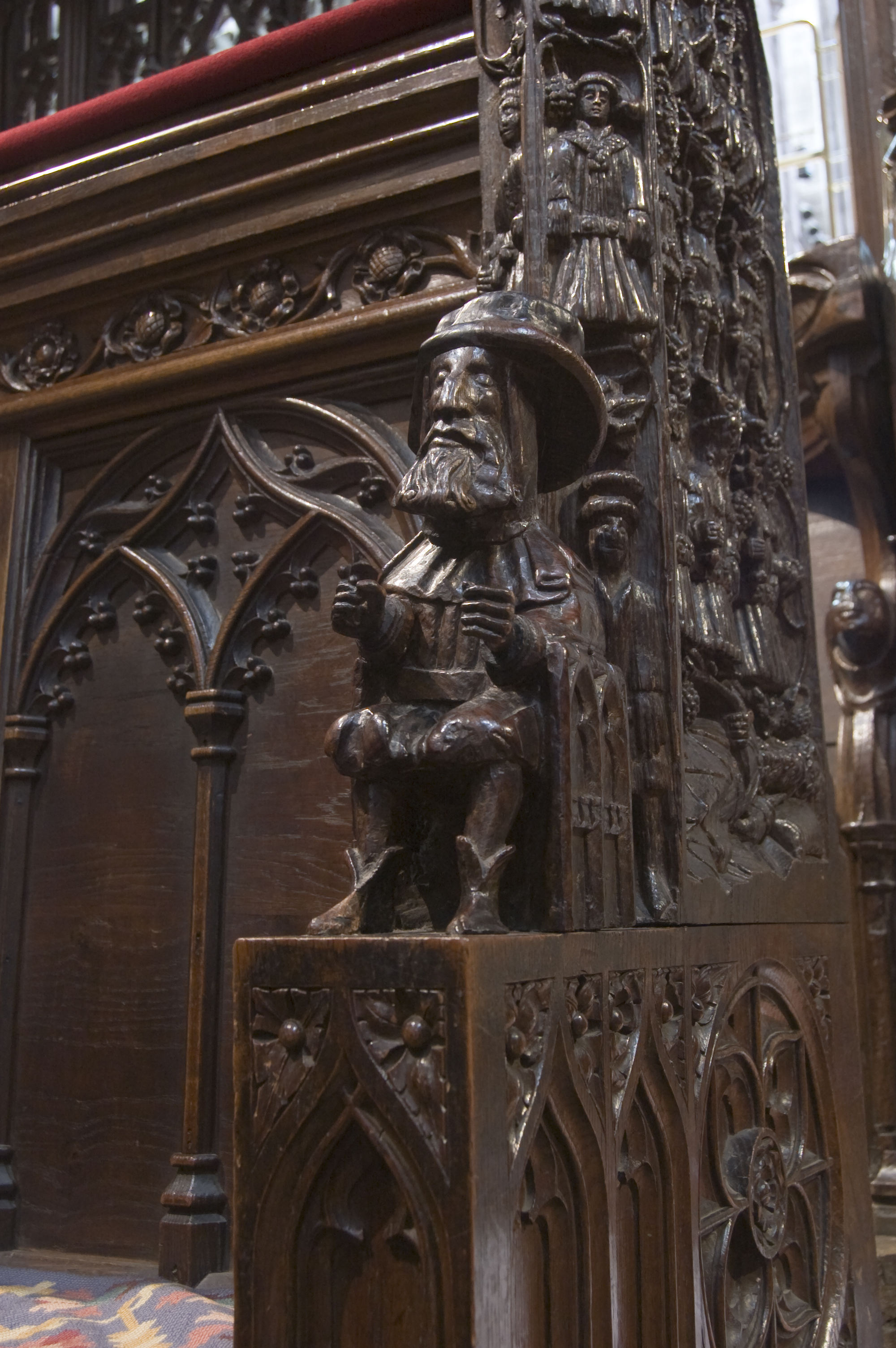
Carving from the Dean's Chair

=== Dean and chapter ===
As of 3 January 2024:

- Dean — Tim Stratford (since 8 September 2018)
- Canon Missioner & Vice Dean — Jane Brooke (since 11 September 2010 installation; Acting Dean, 2017–2018)
- Canon for Worship and Spirituality – Rosie Woodall (since 20 May 2023 licensing)

==== Services ====
The cathedral is a place of Christian worship, with two services held daily, and four or five each Sunday. There is Holy Communion each day, and Choral Evensong each day except Wednesday. There is a sung service of cathedral Eucharist every Sunday.

=== Music ===
The Organist and Master of the Choristers is Philip Rushforth, Head of Music Outreach and Assistant Organist, Dan Mathieson and Sub-Organist, Alexander Palotai. There are lunchtime organ recitals weekly on Thursday at 1:10pm, immediately following Holy Communion. The monthly program of music is available on the cathedral's website.

The hymn-writer William Cooke (1821–1894) was a canon of Chester.

==== Organists ====
The earliest recorded appointment of an organist is of John Brycheley in 1541. Notable organists include the composers Robert White and John Sanders, conductor George Guest and the recording artist Roger Fisher.

==== Choirs ====
The choral tradition at Chester is 900 years old, dating from the foundation of the Benedictine monastery. In 1741 Handel heard the first recital of his Messiah at Chester. There are usually eight choral services in the cathedral each week. Chester has a cathedral choir of male lay clerks, choral scholars, boy and girl choristers and a Nave Choir which is of mixed voice. They rehearse in the Song School, built on the site of the former Monks' Dormitory. In addition to singing at services, the choir perform in concerts, tour abroad, and make recording on CDs. There was a choir school at the cathedral until 1975 but since that time choristers come from local schools. The Nave Choir, which sings Compline on Sunday evenings and in other services, also takes part in concerts, and undertakes tours. Having been founded during the 1860s, it is the longest-running voluntary cathedral choir in Britain.

=== Activities ===
Apart from services, a variety of events such as concerts, recitals, exhibitions and tours are held at the cathedral. There are weekly lunchtime organ recitals each Thursday, and concerts by the Chester Cathedral Nave Choir.

The cathedral and precinct are open to visits both by individuals and by groups. The former Refectory of the abbey is used as a café. The Refectory, the Cloister Room, the Chapter House, and the Vestibule can be hired for meetings, receptions and other purposes.

== Burials ==
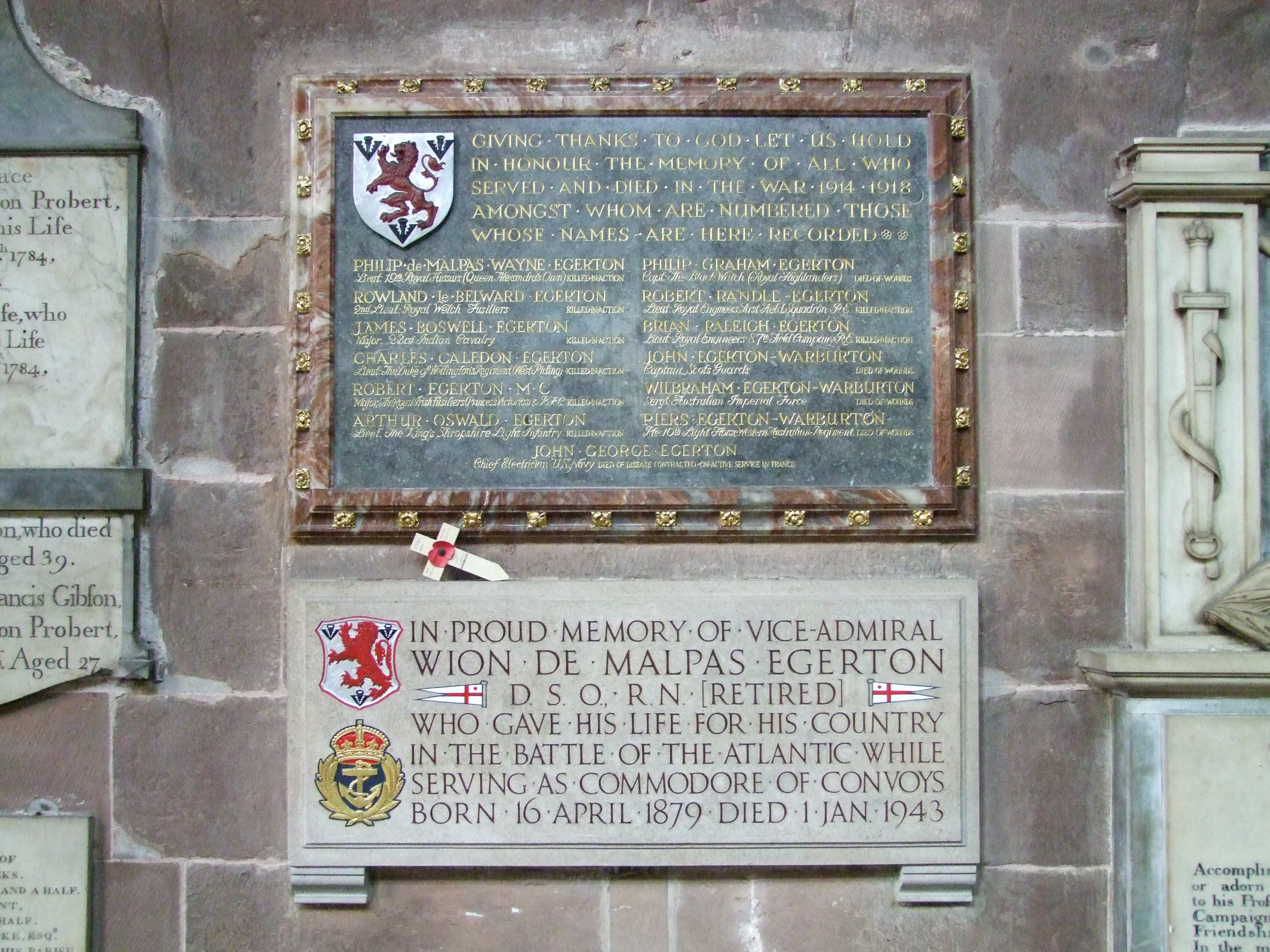
Memorial plaques of the Egerton family in the south transept: a tablet to family members killed during the First World War (top) and a tablet to Vice-Admiral Wion Egerton (below), killed in the Second

- Hugh d'Avranches, 1st Earl of Chester (c. 1047 – 27 July 1101), first in the cemetery of Saint Werberg, reburied in the Chapter House
- Ranulf le Meschin, 3rd Earl of Chester (1070–1129)
- Ranulf de Gernon, 4th Earl of Chester, and his wife Maud of Gloucester, Countess of Chester
- Hugh de Kevelioc, 5th Earl of Chester
- Ranulf de Blondeville, 6th Earl of Chester (1170–1232)
- Ranulf Higden (c. 1280–1364), chronicler
- John Pearson, Bishop of Chester (1673–1686)
- Samuel Peploe, Bishop of Chester (1725–1752)
- John Graham, Bishop of Chester (1845–1865) — in the cemetery
- George Clarke of Hyde, former Colonial Governor of New York, America between 1736 and 1743
- Frederick Philipse III, a wealthy landowner from New York, America, who was loyal to the British Colonial Government and forced to quit his estates.

== Gallery ==
Stained glass windows

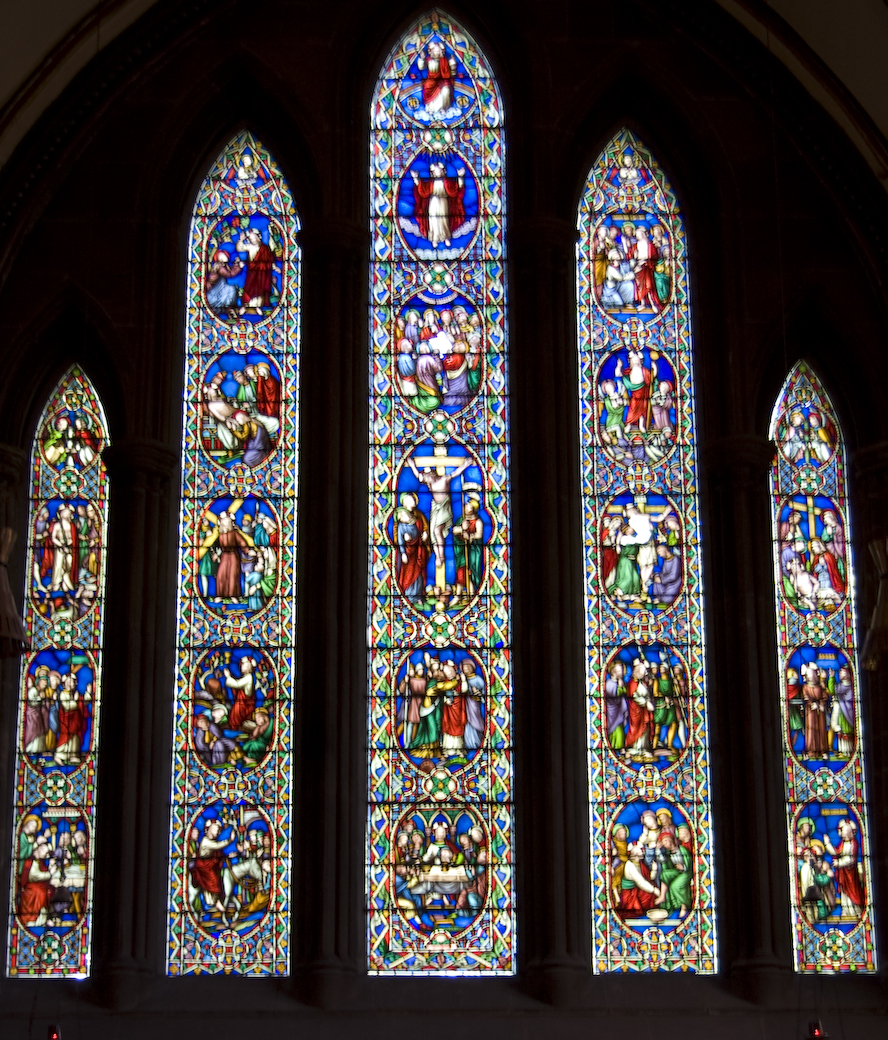
The Lady Chapel has Lancet Gothic windows with mid-19th-century glass by William Wailes (1859) depicting the Passion, Resurrection and Ascension of Christ.

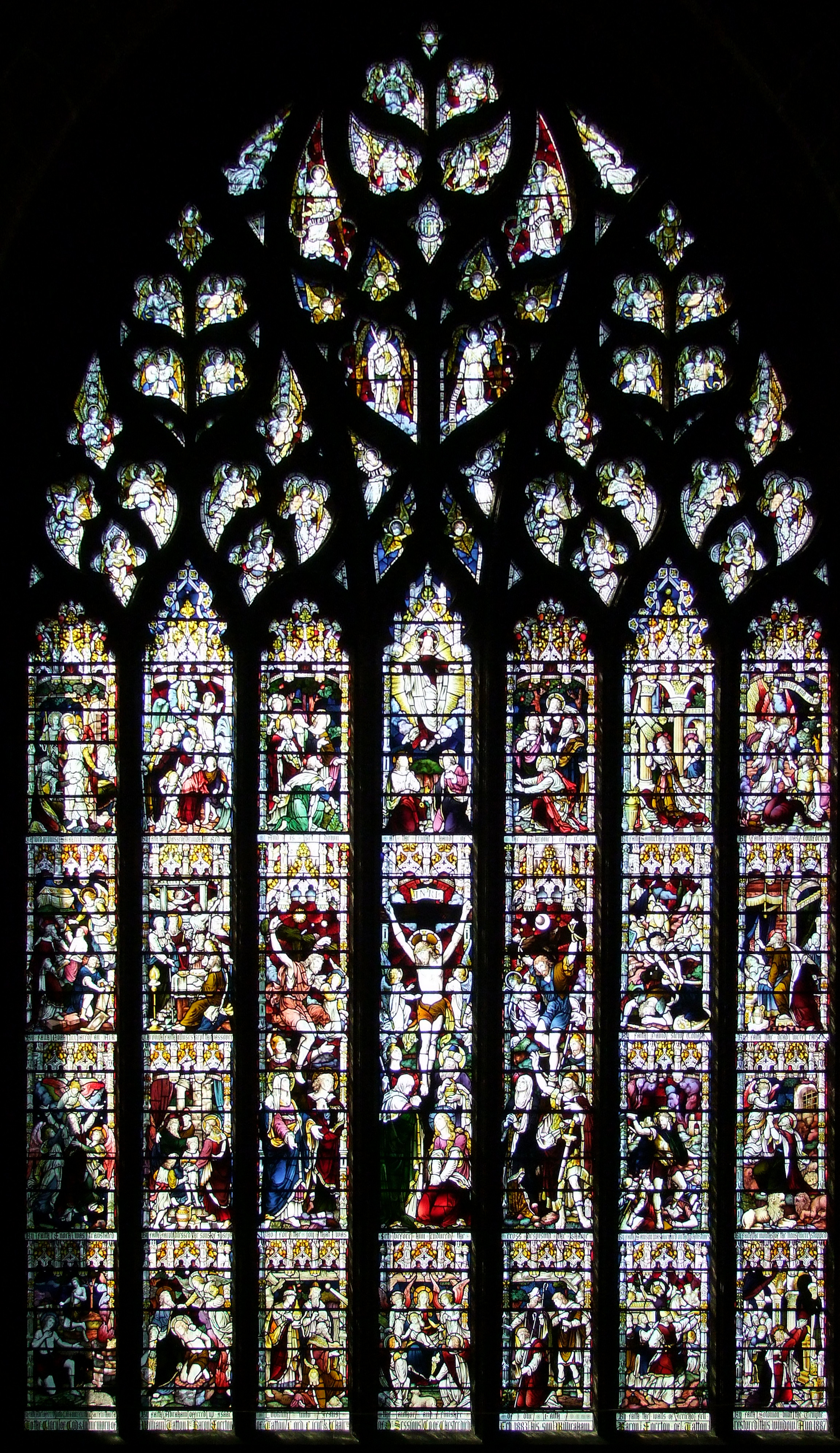
The south transept window, Flowing Decorated Gothic, with High Victorian glass by Heaton Butler and Bayne (1887)

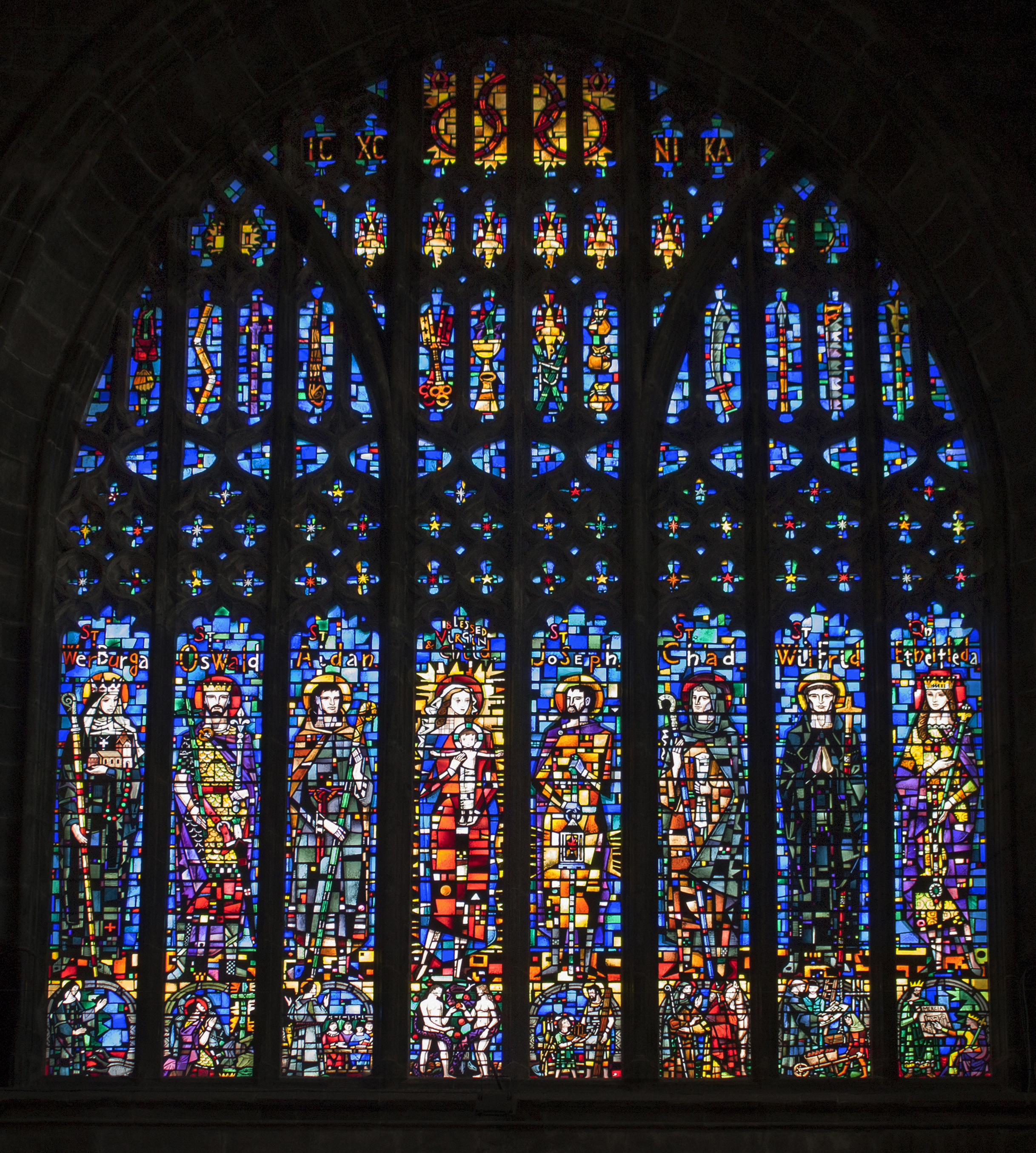
The west window is Perpendicular Gothic with 20th-century stained glass by W. T. Carter Shapland (1961). The Holy Family with Saints Werburgh, Oswald, Aidan, Chad, Wilfrid, and Ethelfleda.

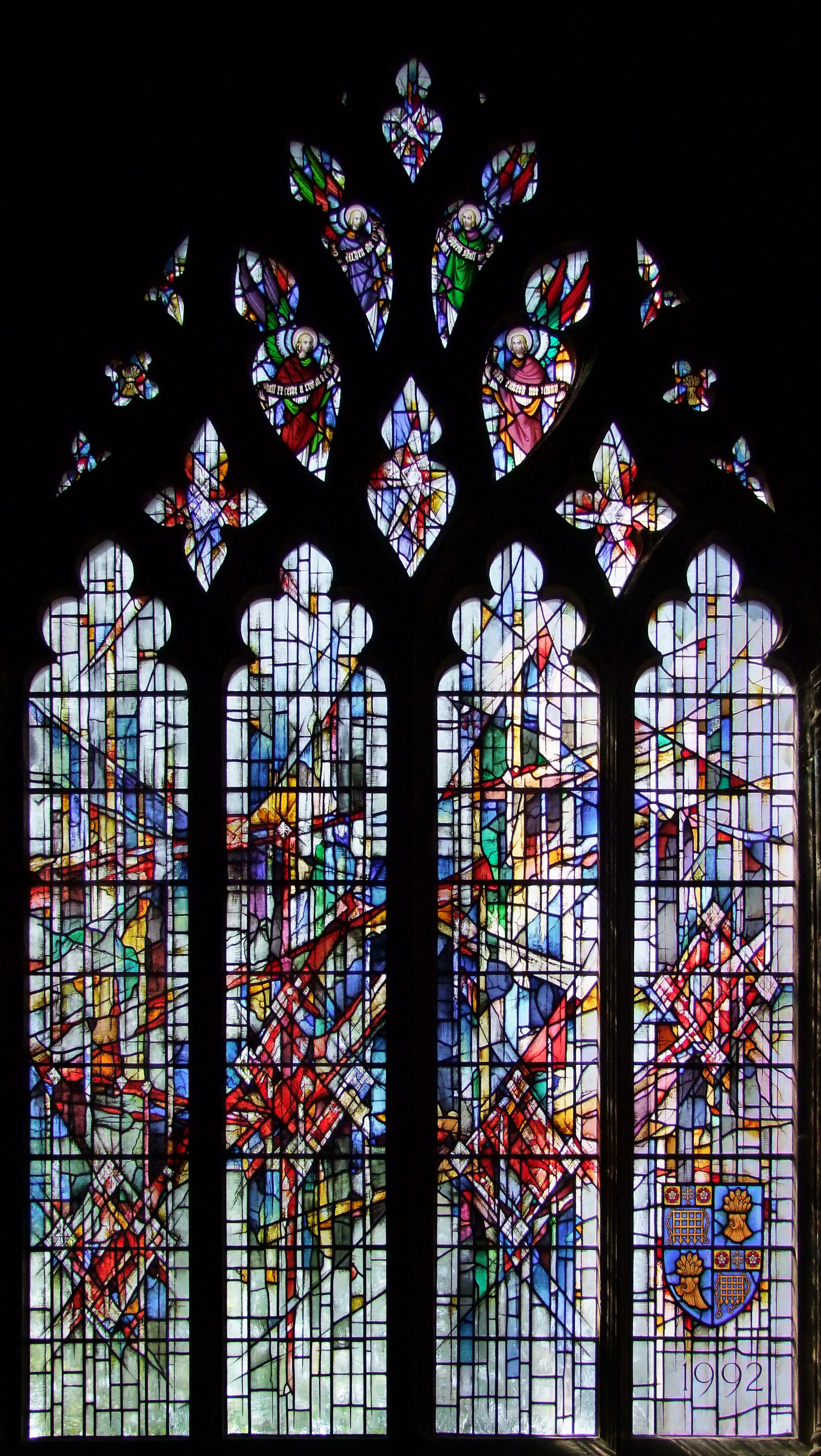
The three Westminster windows by Alan Younger (1992) celebrate the 900th anniversary of the cathedral.

== See also ==
- Architecture of the medieval cathedrals of England
- English Gothic architecture
- Grade I listed buildings in Cheshire West and Chester
- Grade I listed churches in Cheshire
- Norman architecture in Cheshire
- List of works by Thomas Harrison
- List of works by George Pace
- Three hares
- Chester Cathedral Choir
- Chester Cathedral Choir School

== References and notes ==
Notes

Citations

Sources

- Bowerman, Anthony (1996), Chester Cathedral, The Secret Past, Chester: Chester Cathedral, ISBN 0-9522434-2-3
- Clifton-Taylor, Alec (1967), The Cathedrals of England, London: Thames and Hudson, ISBN 0-500-20062-9
- Cowen, Painton (2003), Six Days: The Story of the making of the Chester Cathedral Creation Window, Bristol: Alastair Sawday Publishing, ISBN 1-901970-33-7
- Hartwell, Clare; Hyde, Matthew; Hubbard, Edward; Pevsner, Nikolaus (2011) [1971], Cheshire, The Buildings of England, New Haven and London: Yale University Press, ISBN 978-0-300-17043-6
- Harvey, John (1961) [1950], English Cathedrals (Revised Third ed.), London: B. T. Batsford Ltd., p. 188, OCLC 2683041.
- Home, Beatrice (1925), Gordon Home (ed.), Cathedrals, Abbeys and Famous Churches — Chester, Manchester and Liverpool, J. M. Dent & Sons Ltd, OCLC 1681547
- Hiatt, Charles (1911) [1898], The cathedral church of Chester; a description of the fabric and a brief history of the episcopal see, London: G. Bell, p. 115, OCLC 841718720
- Lewis, C. P. (2008). "Edgar, Chester and the Kingdom of the Mercians, 957-9". In Scragg, Donald (ed.). Edgar King of the English: New Interpretations. Woodbridge, Suffolk: The Boydell Press. pp. 104–123. ISBN 978-1-84383-399-4.
- Morris, Edward; Roberts, Emma (2012), Public Sculpture of Cheshire and Merseyside (excluding Liverpool), Public Sculpture of Britain, vol. 15, Liverpool: Liverpool University Press, ISBN 978-1-84631-492-6
- Nuttall, Derek (2009), "Chester Cathedral Library", Cheshire History, vol. 49, Chester: Cheshire Local History Association, ISSN 0141-8696
- Pevsner, Nikolaus; Hubbard, Edward (2003) [1971], Cheshire, The Buildings of England, New Haven and London: Yale University Press, ISBN 0-300-09588-0
- Richards, Raymond (1947), Old Cheshire Churches, London: Batsford, OCLC 719918
- Sheehan, Bernie (2003). Chester Cathedral. Jarrold Publishing. ISBN 0-7117-3090-3.
- Starkey, H. F. (1990), Old Runcorn, Halton: Halton Borough Council
- Tatton-Brown, Tim; Crook, John (2002), The English Cathedral, London: New Holland, ISBN 1-84330-120-2
- Thacker, Alan (2014). "Chester". In Lapidge, Michael; Blair, John; Keynes, Simon; Scragg, Donald (eds.). The Wiley Blackwell Encyclopaedia of Anglo-Saxon England (2nd ed.). Chichester, UK: Wiley Blackwell. pp. 104–06. ISBN 978-0-631-22492-1.
