= Sarah Baldock =

English organist and choral conductor

Sarah Baldock (born 5 April 1975) is an English organist and choral conductor, formerly the Organist and Master of the Choristers of Chichester Cathedral. She is notable as one of the earliest women to be appointed to the senior music post at a Church of England cathedral. She was married to counter-tenor David Hurley. Baldock has become known as a popular soloist in the UK and abroad.

== Education and early career ==
Baldock was educated as a music scholar at St Paul's Girls' School in London and then as organ scholar of Pembroke College, Cambridge, winning prizes in the RCO diploma examinations and a bursary for postgraduate study with David Sanger and Thomas Trotter. She was a finalist in the 1998 Calgary International, and prizewinner at the 2000 Odense and 2002 Dallas International Organ Competitions.

Baldock has been a faculty member of the Calgary, Edinburgh and Oundle Organ Courses, and involved in education projects at the Royal Festival Hall and Birmingham Symphony Hall. Sarah has directed choral workshops in the UK, US, Norway and Sweden. Performances have included concertos with the Royal Philharmonic Orchestra, the City of Birmingham Symphony Orchestra and the Hampshire County Youth Orchestra and solo concerts in the Channel Islands, Europe, US and Canada.

== Career ==
=== Tonbridge School ===
Baldock was Organist in Residence at Tonbridge School in Kent and in 1998 she released a solo CD on the Marcussen organ in Tonbridge School Chapel for Herald.

=== Winchester ===
In 1998 Sarah moved to Winchester Cathedral where she founded the Girls' Choir and in 2002 became assistant director of Music, accompanying the Choir in daily services, tours, broadcasts and recordings. During her time in Winchester she was accompanist to the Waynflete Singers and Organ Performance Tutor at the University of Southampton.

=== Chichester ===
In December 2007, Baldock was appointed Organist and Master of the Choristers at Chichester Cathedral on the retirement of Alan Thurlow. She took up the post after Easter 2008, becoming, after Katherine Dienes-Williams of Guildford Cathedral, the second earliest appointment of a woman to the senior music post at a Church of England cathedral. Following her resignation from the Cathedral in 2014, Charles Harrison, assistant director of Music at Lincoln Cathedral was appointed to succeed her.

=== Cheltenham Ladies' College ===
In March 2014, it was announced that Baldock had been appointed a music teacher at Cheltenham Ladies' College; she started at the school in September 2014.

=== Winchester College ===
Since September 2022, Baldock has held the post of Director of Music at Winchester College, being the first woman to take up this role.

== Discography ==
- 2005 - 1605 Treason and Dischord: William Byrd and the Gunpowder Plot, with the King's Singers and Concordia, for Signum
- 2005 - Immortal Fire: Music for Female Saints, with Andrew Lumsden and the Winchester Cathedral Choir, for Griffin & Co Ltd.
- 2006 - Advent in Winchester, with Andrew Lumsden and the Winchester Cathedral Choir, for Griffin & Co Ltd.
- 2009 - Carols from Chichester Cathedral, with Mark Wardell (organ) and the Choir of Chichester Cathedral for Herald AV Publications
- 2010 - Holst in Chichester, with the Band of Her Majesty's Royal Marines Portsmouth (directed by Lt Col Nick Grace RM), Mark Wardell (organ) and the Choir of Chichester Cathedral, for Herald AV Publications
- 2011 - The Organ of Chichester Cathedral: Sarah Baldock, for Herald AV Publications
- 2012 - Advent Procession, with Timothy Ravalde (organ) and the Choir of Chichester, for Herald AV Publications
- 2013 - The Day Thou Gavest, with Timothy Ravalde (organ) and the Choir of Chichester Cathedral, for Herald AV Publications

Cultural offices
| Preceded by Alan Thurlow | Organist and Master of the Choristers of Chichester Cathedral; 2008–2014 | Succeeded by Charles Harrison |
