= Alan Thurlow =

English organist

Alan John Thurlow (born 18 May 1947) is an English organist. He is best known as having been Organist and Master of the Choristers of Chichester Cathedral between 1980 and 2008.

== Education ==
Thurlow was educated at Bancroft's School, Woodford Green. He read Music at Sheffield University before going on to Emmanuel College, Cambridge, for a period of research into pre-Reformation English Church Music.

== Organist career ==
Thurlow joined the church choir at St Barnabas' Church, Woodford Green at the age of eight and became Master of Music at the church during his time at Bancroft's School. He held his position at St Barnabas' Church until 1973.

=== Durham ===
In 1973 he was appointed Sub-Organist at Durham Cathedral, and whilst there combined his duties at the Cathedral with those of Director of Music at the Chorister School and part-time Lecturer in Music at Durham University.

=== Chichester ===
In 1980 Thurlow succeeded Dr John Birch as Organist and Master of the Choristers of Chichester Cathedral. His first task was to oversee the rebuilding of the historic organ in the Cathedral, which had been abandoned as unplayable in 1972. Thurlow served as Administrator of the Committee which raised the funds for the Mander restoration that was completed in 1986. The Chichester organ is notable as being the only Cathedral organ in the country that escaped being romanticised in the nineteenth century. In the 1990s he served as a founder member of the Management Executive of the newly opened Pallant House Gallery, later continuing as a Trustee of the Friends of the Gallery. He has travelled with the Cathedral Choir and the RSCM to France, the Netherlands, Germany, South Africa and the United States of America.

Thurlow retired from Chichester Cathedral in 2008. He has been credited with greatly improving the quality of music at the cathedral by expanding the choir's repertoire and building its reputation on the world stage.

== Activism ==
Thurlow has long been a vocal opponent of mixed voice treble lines in cathedral choirs. In 1997 he offered his resignation to the Dean and Chapter of Chichester Cathedral after Salisbury Cathedral insisted that their newly founded girls choir should sing together with the boy choristers at the 1998 Southern Cathedrals Festival that was to be held in Chichester. Thurlow told a meeting of the Festival's trustees that his position would be made untenable if he were to accept this request, as he had "made such a strong case against this for so long" and "felt in (his) heart that it was wrong". Thurlow was backed by his choir, members of the Chichester congregation and the Dean of Chichester John Treadgold. Treadgold refused his resignation and a compromise was reached with Salisbury. Since 2013 he has been Vice President of Campaign for the Traditional Cathedral Choir, the controversial advocacy group that was established in 1996 as a direct response to the rise of girls' choirs in the United Kingdom.

For twelve years Thurlow was Chairman of the national charity, Friends of Cathedral Music, and for two years he served as President of the Cathedral Organists' Association. Nationally, he has served as Chairman of the Organs Advisory Committee for the Care of Churches. He is a Fellow of the Royal College of Organists and the Royal School of Church Music, and honorary Fellow of both The Guild of Church Musicians and The Guild of Musicians and Singers, and in 2005 he received the award of a Lambeth Doctorate from The Archbishop of Canterbury.

== Television appearance ==
In March 2013, Thurlow appeared in an episode of Who Do You Think You Are?, in which the comedian John Bishop traced his great-great grandfather to the city of Chichester. Thurlow showed Bishop around Chichester Cathedral Library, as they discovered that Bishop's relative had been a Lay Vicar at the cathedral.

== Discography ==
As director:

- 2007 - Jubilate
- 2007 - Let Us Lift Up Our Heart: 19th Century Church Music
- 1999 - Benedicite
- 1999 - A Christmas Festival
- 1997 - Sing Ye to the Lord
- 1996 - Chichester Commissions
- 1996 - Great Cathedral Anthems Vol. 7
- 1994 - Malcolm Archer: Requiem
- 1999 - A Festival of Anthems
- 1991 - Magnificat and Nunc Dimittis Vol. 2
- 1991 - The Welkin Rings
- 1990 - Choral Music of Charles V. Stanford
- 1984 - 19th Century Church Music by Goss, Ousely, Smart, Stainer and S.S. Wesley
- 1984 - Cathedral Music by Geoffrey Burgon
- 1982 - Carols from Chichester
- 1981 - Peter Davey - Head Chorister of Chichester Cathedral
- 1981 - O Praise God in his Holiness

As organist:

- 1986 - The Four Pipe Organs of Chichester Cathedral
- 1978 - Carols from Durham Cathedral
- 1978 - In Quires and Places (No. 26. Durham Cathedral Choir)

Cultural offices
Preceded by John Birch	Organist and Master of the Choristers of Chichester Cathedral; 1980–2008	Succeeded by Sarah Baldock
