= Charles Harrison (musician) =

British organist (born 1974)

Charles Harrison (born 21 March 1974) has been Organist and Master of the Choristers of Chichester Cathedral since September 2014, succeeding Sarah Baldock. He has also held musical posts at Southwell Minster, Carlisle and Lincoln Cathedral.

== Early life and education ==
Harrison was a cathedral chorister at Southwell Minster, where was tutored by Kenneth Beard and Paul Hale, and he took up the organ scholarship at Southwell in 1991 while he studied for A-levels at Southwell Minster School. In the following year, he started as an organ scholar at Jesus College, Cambridge in 1992, where he read for a degree in music. Whilst at Cambridge, he studied the organ with David Sanger and, in his second year, became a prizewinning Fellow of the Royal College of Organists. When he graduated, he was appointed to the position of Assistant Organist at Carlisle Cathedral.

== Career ==
=== Carlisle ===
Whilst at Carlisle Cathedral, Harrison developed his career as a solo instrumentalist, appearing in recitals and numerous international competitions. In 1999, he was awarded prizes in the St Albans International Organ Festival, and in the following year at the Odense International Organ Competition. After three years at Carlisle, he moved to Belfast, Northern Ireland.

=== Belfast ===
In 2000, Harrison took up a part-time teaching position at Queen's University Belfast, specialising in harmony, counterpoint and keyboard skills. He also became Director of Music at St George's Church, Belfast.

=== Lincoln ===
In September 2003, Harrison returned to England, having been appointed Assistant Director of Music and Sub Organist of Lincoln Cathedral after Simon Morley left to become Director of Music at Ripon Cathedral. Harrison held the position for eleven years, accompanying services and directing the choir of boys and men, and latterly the choir of girls and men. Following the resignation of Sarah Baldock in 2014, he took up the position as Organist and Master of the Choristers at Chichester Cathedral.

=== Chichester ===
Harrison moved to Chichester in September 2014, as Organist and Master of the Choristers, directing the Choir of Chichester Cathedral. He has played or directed world premieres of works by Judith Bingham, Joanna Marsh, Judith Weir, Gabriel Crouch, John Joubert, Philip Moore, Tarik O’Regan and Frederick Stocken.

== Discography ==
- 2023 - What Joy so True with the Rose Consort of Viols and Chichester Cathedral Choir, for Regent Records
- 2018 – Lest We Forget, with Timothy Ravalde (organ) and Chichester Cathedral Choir, for Signum Records
- 2016 – Long, Long Ago: Christmas Music from Chichester, with Timothy Ravalde (organ) and Chichester Cathedral Choir, for Concentio
- 2016 – The Complete Psalms of David: Volume 10, Series 2, with Timothy Ravalde (organ) and Chichester Cathedral Choir, for Priory Records
- 2013 – Great Hymns from Lincoln, with Aric Prentice (director) and Lincoln Minster School Chamber Choir, for Priory Records
- 2012 – IRELAND, J.: Church Music, with Aric Prentice (director) and Lincoln Cathedral Choir, for Naxos Records
- 2011 – Organ Duets by Mozart, Mendelssohn, Langlais, Tomkins, Carleton, Johnstone, Leighton, with David Leigh (organ), for Guild Records
- 2008 – O be joyful in the Lord, with Aric Prentice (director) and Lincoln Cathedral Choir, for Guild Records
- 2006 – Schmitt: Orchestral Music, with BBC National Orchestra and Chorus of Wales conducted by Thierry Fischer, for Hyperion Records
- 2005 – Hail Mary, with Aric Prentice (director) and Lincoln Cathedral Choir, for Guild Records
- 1998 – Comfort & Joy: Music for Advent, Christmas, Epiphany and Candlemas, with Jeremy Suter (director) and Carlisle Cathedral Choir

== See also ==
- Organs and organists of Chichester Cathedral

Cultural offices
Preceded by Ian Hare	Assistant Organist of Carlisle Cathedral; 1995–1999	Succeeded by David Gibbs
Preceded by Simon Morley	Assistant Director of Music and Sub Organist of Lincoln Cathedral; 2003–2014	Succeeded by Jeffrey Makinson
Preceded by Sarah Baldock	Organist and Master of the Choristers of Chichester Cathedral; 2014–	Succeeded by Incumbent
