= Choir of Chichester Cathedral =

- Choir
- Choir in 2009
- Choirmaster: Charles Harrison
- Organist: Timothy Ravalde
- Affiliation: Chichester Cathedral
- Website: chichestercathedral.org.uk

The musical foundation of Chichester Cathedral consists of

- the organist and master of the choristers, the assistant organist and the organ scholar; together with
- six lay vicars, adult professional singers who all have everyday jobs.
- eighteen choristers, six probationers – and including a head chorister and a senior chorister (deputy head) who both wear a notable medallion on a red ribbon according to their office held. In 2022 the choir recruited girl probationers for the first time.

The choristers and probationers are boarders at the Prebendal School, the cathedral's choir school As well as singing, choristers learn the piano and an orchestral instrument, spending at least eighteen hours a week on musical performance.

== Appearances ==
During school term, the cathedral has eight sung services a week. Evensong is sung by the choir every day, with the exception of Wednesday. Additionally, on Sunday, Mattins and Eucharist are sung in the morning.

Each year, the choir appears at the Chichester Festival Theatre at Christmas where they sing Christmas concerts alongside local school choirs, including the Bishop Luffa School Choir, and are accompanied by the Band of HM Royal Marines, Portsmouth. They sing a variety of carols and are directed by the organist and master of the choristers. The choristers return to the Prebendal School in the interval and Close Company perform.

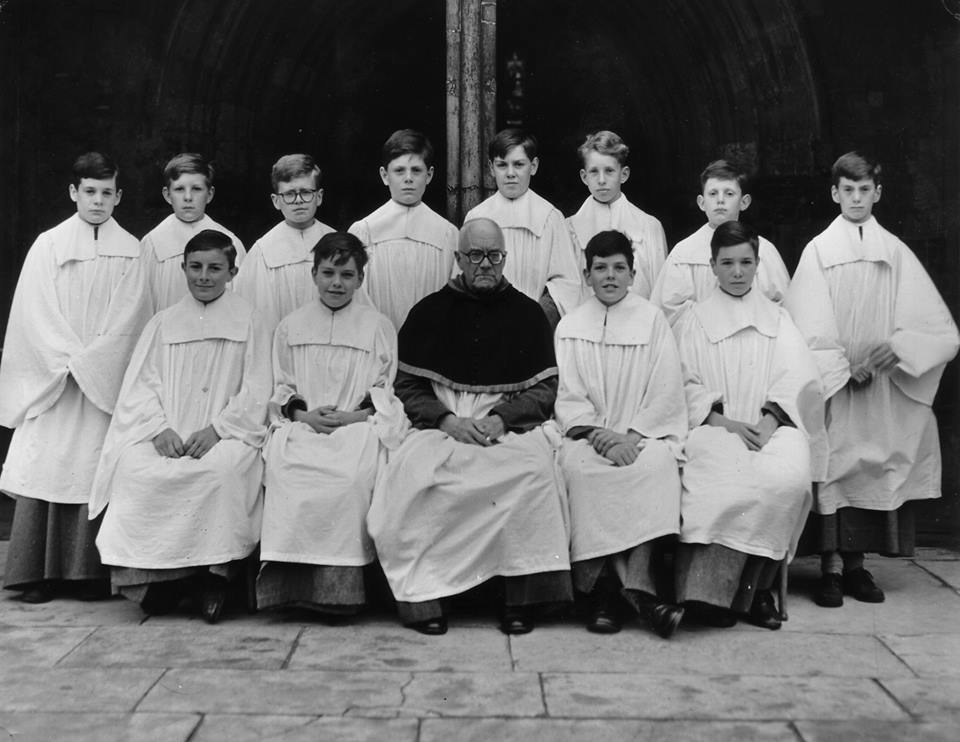
The choristers with choir director Horace Hawkins, in 1958

The choir sing at the Chichester Festivities each year in a concert called "Chichester Cathedral Choir By Candelight". The programme normally consists of music by composers who are being commemorated that year. As tradition follows, the choir leave the stage and exit the cathedral, carrying candles and singing a hymn, "The Day thou Gavest Lord is Ended". It is one of the festival's perennial favourites. In the concert, there are also solo items played by the assistant organist and organ scholar. The ensemble accompanying the choir also performs its own piece.

They also participate in the Southern Cathedrals Festival with the cathedral choirs of Winchester and Salisbury. They have taken part in this annual festival since it was first established in 1904. The choir stays at the hosting cathedral's choir school. The choir perform concerts, sing Evensong and participate in masterclasses.

The choir has appeared with many different artists including Petula Clark, Richard Stilgoe, the King's Singers, the Cambridge Buskers, the Philip Jones Brass Ensemble and Cantabile. Television appearances have included Plácido Domingo's Christmas programme and Rumpole of the Bailey.

In 2009 their recording of Christmas music won the Critics Christmas Choice of the Year award in both Gramophone Magazine and BBC Music Magazine.

In 2024 the Cathedral choir recorded 15 minutes of music to be used in Chichester Festival Theatre's summer production of the Coram Boy (play).

== Tours ==
Each year, the choir visits churches in the Diocese of Chichester and sing Evensong. They also frequently tour other countries with links to Chichester Cathedral.

Choir tours since 1998 include:

- 2017 - Leiden and Haarlem, Holland
- 2015 – Chartres, France
- 2013 – Bamberg & Bayreuth, Germany
- 2011 – Ravenna, Italy
- 2010 – Berlin, Germany
- 2007 – Bamberg, Germany
- 2006 – Chartres, France
- 2006 – Lessay, France
- 2005 – Cape Town, South Africa
- 2000 – Bamberg, Germany
- 2002 – Bayreuth, Germany
- 1998 – Chartres, France

== Recordings ==
Recordings since 1976 include:

- 2018 - Lest We Forget
- 2016 – Long, long ago
- 2016 – The Complete Psalms of David: Volume 10, Series 2
- 2016 – Music for Lent and Passiontide
- 2013 – The Day Thou Gavest
- 2012 – Advent Procession
- 2010 – Holst in Chichester
- 2009 – Carols from Chichester Cathedral
- 2007 – Jubilate
- 2007 – Let Us Lift Up Our Heart: 19th Century Church Music
- 1999 – Benedicite
- 1997 – Sing Ye to the Lord
- 1996 – Chichester Commissions
- 1996 – Great Cathedral Anthems Vol. 7
- 1994 – Malcolm Archer: Requiem
- 1991 – Magnificat and Nunc Dimittis Vol. 2
- 1991 – The Welkin Rings
- 1984 – 19th Century Church Music by Goss, Ousely, Smart, Stainer and S.S. Wesley
- 1984 – Cathedral Music by Geoffrey Burgon
- 1977 – Christmas in Chichester
- 1976 – In Quires and Places...

== Close Company ==
Close Company
- Origin: Chichester, England
- Genres: Classical; Barbershop
- Years active: 1993 – present
- Members: Lay vicars of Chichester Cathedral

Close Company is the name used by the lay vicars of Chichester Cathedral when they sing the men's voices barbershop repertory made popular in the United Kingdom by the King's Singers. As well as being professional singers, most of them work everyday jobs. Every evening they are back in the cathedral with the choristers for Evensong at 5.30 pm. The lay vicar who has been in the cathedral choir for the longest is given the title of senior lay vicar.

Their duties with the cathedral choir also include singing concerts and making concerts in the UK and abroad, but they are perhaps best known for their performances at the annual Christmas Carols, having been part of that tradition since 1993 when they first stepped out in their white jackets.

Throughout the rest of the year, Close Company performs in a variety of venues and performances include an evening at the Alexandra Theatre, Bognor Regis, the Assembly Rooms in North Street, St John's College, West Dean College, the Tudor house of St Mary's House, Bramber and the Chichester Festival Theatre. On the choir's 2005 tour of South Africa, Close Company had the honour of performing for Archbishop Desmond Tutu.

== See also ==
- Organs and organists of Chichester Cathedral
