= Winchester Cathedral Choir =

English Anglican church choir

- Choir
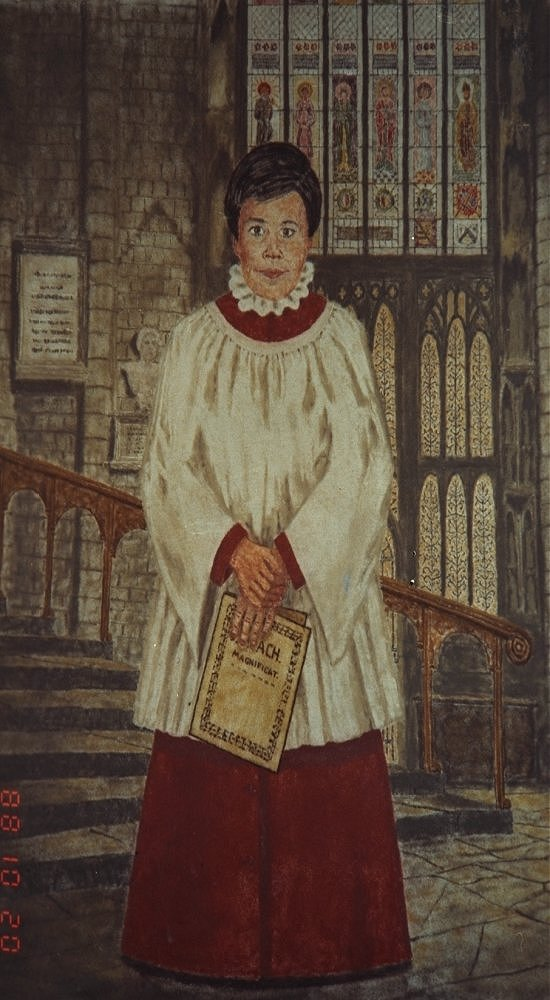
- Winchester Cathedral Chorister holding a Bach score
- Director: Katherine Dienes
- Headquarters: Winchester Cathedral, Winchester
- Website: www.winchester-cathedral.org.uk/choirs-music/the-cathedral-choir/

Winchester Cathedral Choir is an English Anglican choir based at Winchester Cathedral in Winchester in Hampshire. Until 1999 it was a men and boys choir, but there is now a girls choir which for some services sings separately from the boys.

As the beginning of 2026 Katherine Dienes-Williams was appointed Director of Music and it was announced that she would take over later in the year.

== History ==
The exact year in which the chorus was founded is unknown, but it is likely to have been in the 14th century. The earliest historical document relating to the chorus dates from 1402, when a John Dyer was named as the cathedral's organist and chorus-master. A 1544 statute of Henry VIII of England decreed that the cathedral should have ten boys in the choir and a single organist.

Martin Neary, Organist and Director of Music from 1972 to 1988, extended the traditional choral repertoire at Winchester, commissioning new works from Jonathan Harvey and, in particular, John Tavener. (After Tavener´s death his widow commissioned a commemorative sculpture by Angela Conner which was installed in the cathedral). Neary was succeeded at Winchester by David Hill.

Andrew Lumsden moved to Winchester in 2002. He stood down as Director of Music in 2024 and has since worked in Oxford. His departure from Winchester was seen as precipitating a crisis in the cathedral, although as regards music, continuity was provided by Andrew Lucas, formerly of St Albans Cathedral, who was recruited by Winchester in 2024 in an acting capacity. The Bishop of Winchester Philip Mounstephen commissioned a review to find a "way forward". In summarising the report in 2025, the bishop referred to the potential for new appointments to contribute to a solution.

== Membership ==
The choir currently consists of 18 boy choristers and 18 girl choristers with the number of lay clerks (officially 12) under strength. It sings eight services weekly in the Cathedral. The boy choristers all attend The Pilgrims' School, where they study singing, music theory, music history, and at least one instrument in addition to general academic studies. The choir often tours internationally, has produced numerous recordings, and appears often in television and radio broadcasts.

The Girls' Choir was founded in 1999 by Sarah Baldock, who worked with them for ten years. Claudia Grinnell (who served as assistant organist before becoming the cathedral's sub-organist in 2021) had particular responsibility for the choir until 2024. As at 2025, the Girls' Choir was under the joint leadership of the Acting Director of Music, Andrew Lucas, and the Sub-organist, Joshua Stephens.

The girl choristers, who all attend local schools, sing at least one service a week during term-time. They sing with the boy choristers for most major concerts, at Easter and Christmas, and for the Southern Cathedrals Festival every summer (when they also sing with the girl choristers of Salisbury Cathedral). The girls have toured Europe on several occasions, and record CDs, both with the boy choristers and on their own. They have also appeared in many television and radio broadcasts, including singing live on BBC1 on Easter morning, and on Christmas Day.

== Recordings ==
In 1988 the choir recorded a reconstruction of Mozart's unfinished Mass in C minor, K. 427 using the then-new edition prepared by Richard Maunder. Conducted by Christopher Hogwood in a London venue, the choir was augmented by the quiristers of Winchester College.

In 1989, under David Hill, the choir made a recording for Hyperion of the 40-part motet Spem in alium by Thomas Tallis. At the time the choir had 20 choristers and 12 lay clerks (adults). Some small choirs have used overdubbing to reach the full complement of voices required by the composer. However, for this recording the choir was augmented by singers from Winchester College and elsewhere. Reviewers noted steady tempi to cope with the cathedral's resonant acoustic and "treble-singing of a fine standard" (Gramophone).

For its Decca 1991 recording of Parry's I was glad, the choir was joined by the Wayneflete Singers and the Bournemouth Symphony Orchestra. The recording has been praised by BBC Radio 3.

== Awards ==
In the 1980s the choir and its treble soloist Paul Miles-Kingston sang in the Lloyd-Webber requiem. The recording was nominated for a Grammy Award (Best Choral Performance).

In 2024 a soundtrack featuring Winchester choristers won a Grammy. The soundtrack was composed for Star Wars Jedi: Survivor and won the award for Best Soundtrack for Video Games and other Interactive Media.
