= Arthur Wills (musician) =

English musician (1926–2020)

- Born: 19 September 1926; Coventry
- Origin: England
- Died: 30 October 2020 (aged 94)
- Occupations: Musician, Composer and Professor

Arthur William Wills OBE (19 September 1926 – 30 October 2020) was an English musician, composer and professor, born in Coventry. He was director of music at Ely Cathedral from 1958 to 1990 and also held a professorship at the Royal Academy of Music in London from 1964 until 1992. He toured extensively as a recitalist in Europe, North America, Australia, New Zealand and Hong Kong. He also broadcast, appeared on television and made many recordings, both as a soloist and with Ely Cathedral Choir.

== Works ==
Wills composed prolifically for the organ and choir. His ensemble works include a concerto with strings and timpani, a concerto for guitar and organ and a symphonic suite, entitled "The Fenlands", for brass band and organ.

His choral concerto, "The Gods of Music", for organ, chorus and brass with percussion ensemble was commissioned for the biannual keyboard festival of the University of Newcastle in New South Wales, Australia, in 1992.

Wills's secular music includes seven song cycles, and an opera, Winston and Julia, based on the George Orwell novel Nineteen Eighty-Four.

His book Organ appeared in the Menuhin Music Guide Series in 1984, with a second edition in 1993 and a third reprint in 1997.

The Ely Choir has recorded a CD (HAVPCD 197) of his choral and organ music from 1955 to 1990 on Herald AV Publications. In May 1999 Hyperion Records reissued two recordings from the early 1980s on one CD (CDH55003): "The Fenlands" (featuring the City of Cambridge Band), in addition to music by Edward Elgar and William Walton, together with his transcription of Modest Mussorgsky's Pictures at an Exhibition for solo organ.

His recording Full Stops was first issued in 1978. It includes his variations on "Amazing Grace". It was issued on CD (84305) in 1995 by Meridian.

In celebration of Wills's 75th birthday in 2001, Jeremy Filsell recorded a CD of his organ music on the organ of Tonbridge School chapel. Wills is the voice of the narrator in his variations on a theme of Henry Purcell, "Wondrous Machine" (Guild GMCD 7225).

Novello published Wills's transcription for organ of three movements from Gustav Holst's The Planets suite: Mars, Venus and Jupiter. These were recordings of Joseph Nolan at the organ of Ripon Cathedral on Herald AV Publications (HAVPCD 274).

Robert Crowley studied with Wills at the Royal Academy of Music and recorded Icons (LAMM168D), a CD of Wills's organ music on the rebuilt organ of Ely Cathedral. The CD's record label, Lammas, is headed by Lance Andrews, who was a chorister at Ely Cathedral in the early 1950s when Wills was Assistant Organist.

Wills's memoirs, Full with Wills (ISBN 1905203896), were published by Pen Press in 2006.

Wills died, aged 94, on 30 October 2020. His Requiem Funeral was held at Ely Cathedral in November 2020

== Awards ==
Wills was awarded an OBE in 1990.

Cultural offices
Preceded by Michael Howard	Organist and Master of the Choristers of Ely Cathedral; 1958–1990	Succeeded by Paul Trepte
