= Jesus College, Cambridge =

Constituent college of the University of Cambridge, England

Jesus College
- University of Cambridge
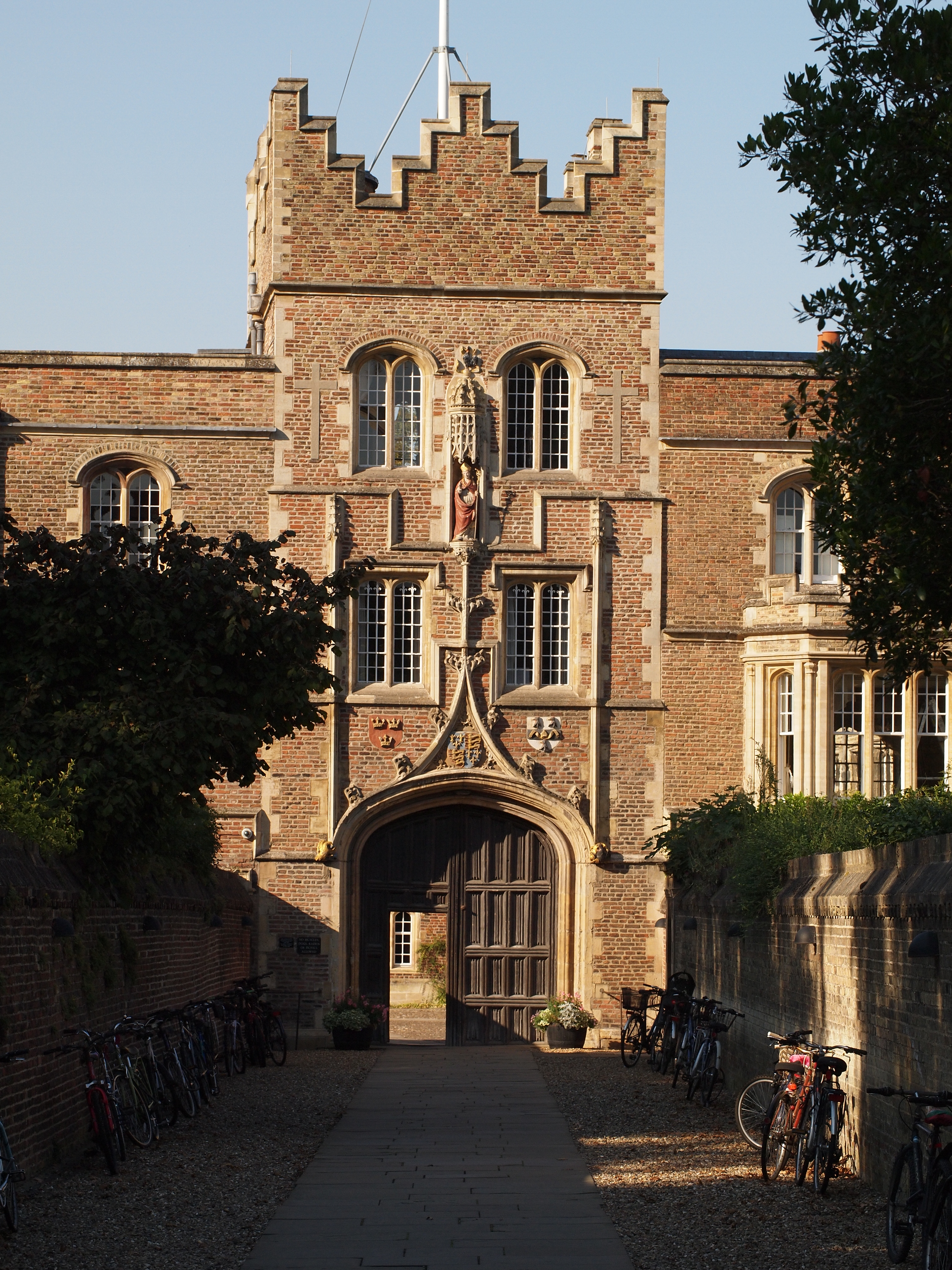
- College gatehouse seen from the "Chimney"

- Arms: Argent, a fesse sable among three cocks' heads erased sable, crested and jelloped gules; all within a bordure of the last charged with eight ducal coronets Or
Scarf colours: three equal stripes of red and black, with red in the middle on one side of the scarf, and black in the middle on the other
- Location: Jesus Lane (map)
- Coordinates: 52°12′33″N 00°07′24″E
- Full name: The College of the Blessed Virgin Mary, Saint John the Evangelist and the glorious Virgin Saint Radegund, within the City and University of Cambridge
- Latin name: Collegium Beatissime Marie Virginis Sancti Johannis Evangeliste et Gloriose Virginis Sancte Radegundis iuxta Cantebriggiam
- Abbreviation: JE
- Motto: Prosperum iter facias (Latin)
- Motto in English: "May your journey be successful"
- Founder: John Alcock
- Established: 1496; 530 years ago
- Named after: Jesus Christ
- Sister college: Jesus College, Oxford
- Master: Sonita Alleyne
- Undergraduates: 538 (2022-23)
- Postgraduates: 395 (2022-23)
- Endowment: £238.08 million
- Website: www.jesus.cam.ac.uk
- JCSU: jcsu.jesus.cam.ac.uk
- MCR: mcr.jesus.cam.ac.uk
- Boat club: Jesus College Boat Club

Map
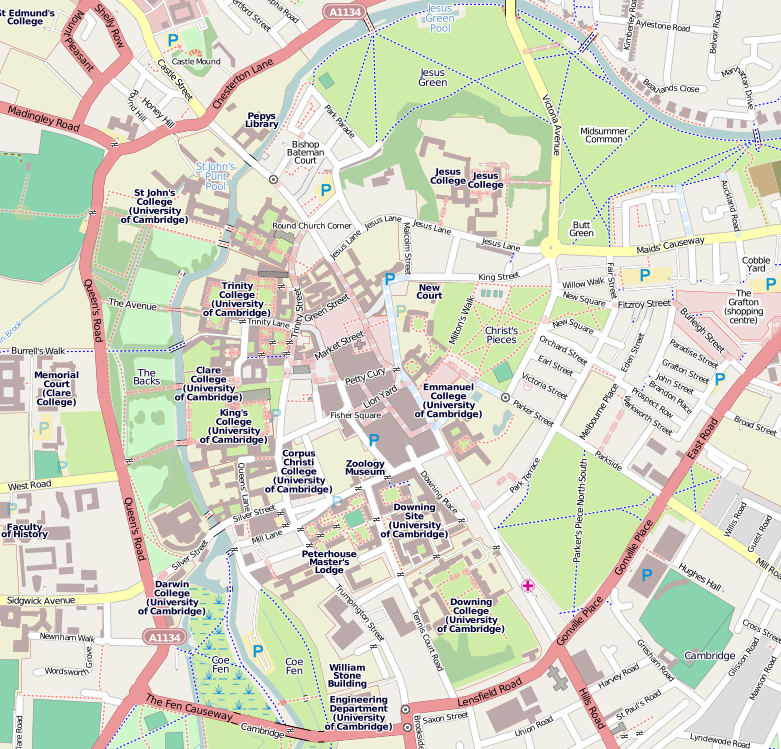
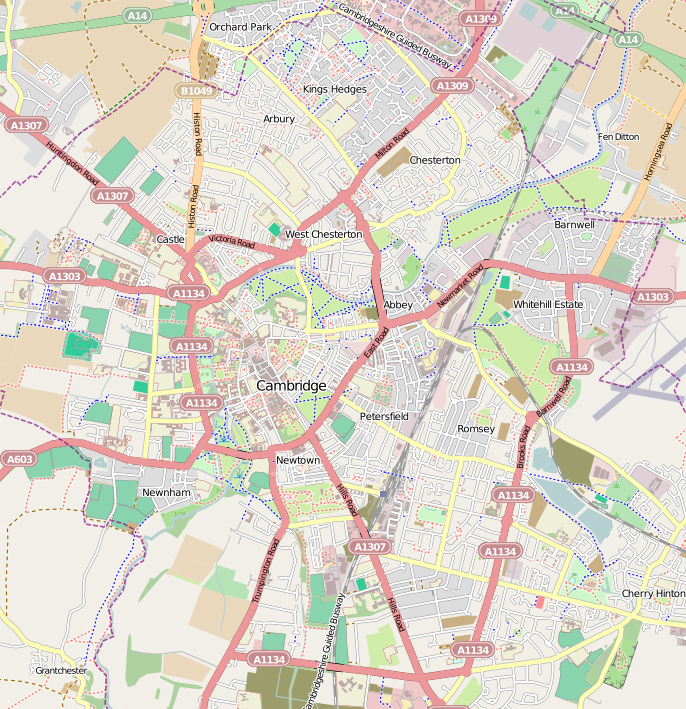
- Location within Central Cambridge Location within Cambridge

Jesus College (Note: The college's full name is The College of the Blessed Virgin Mary, Saint John the Evangelist and the glorious Virgin Saint Radegund, near Cambridge. Its common name comes from the name of its chapel, Jesus Chapel.) is a constituent college of the University of Cambridge. Jesus College was established in 1496 on the site of the twelfth-century Benedictine nunnery of St Mary and St Radegund by John Alcock, then Bishop of Ely. The cockerel is the symbol of Jesus College, after the surname of its founder. From 1560 to 1860, Jesus College was primarily a training college for Church of England clergy.

Jesus College has assets of approximately £375M, making it Cambridge's seventh-wealthiest college. The college is known for its particularly expansive grounds which include its sporting fields and for its proximity to its boathouse. Three members of Jesus College have each received a Nobel Prize. Two fellows of the college have been appointed to the International Court of Justice.

Sonita Alleyne was elected master of Jesus College in 2019, 40 years after the college began admitting women as students. She is also the first black leader of an Oxbridge college.

== History ==
When founded in 1496, the college consisted of buildings taken over from the Nunnery of St Mary and St Radegund, which was founded at the beginning of the 12th century. The chapel is the oldest university building in Cambridge still in use and predates the foundation of the college by 350 years; it also predates the university by half a century.

The Benedictine Convent, upon dissolution, included the chapel and the cloister attached to it; the nuns' refectory, which became the college hall; and the former lodging of the prioress, which became the Master's Lodge. This set of buildings remains the core of the college to this day and this accounts for its distinctly monastic architectural style, which sets it apart from other Cambridge colleges. A library was soon added, and the chapel was considerably modified and reduced in scale by Alcock. At its foundation, the college had a master, six fellows and six scholars.

== Academic profile ==
Jesus College admits undergraduate and graduate students to all subjects at the university though typically accepts a larger number of students for engineering, medicine, law, natural sciences, mathematics, economics, history, languages, and human, social and political sciences. The college offers a wide range of scholarships.

The college consistently performs well in the informal Tompkins Table, which ranks Cambridge colleges by undergraduate results. Along with students from Trinity, King's, Christ's and St John's Colleges, students of the college have been members of the Cambridge Apostles.

== Buildings and grounds ==
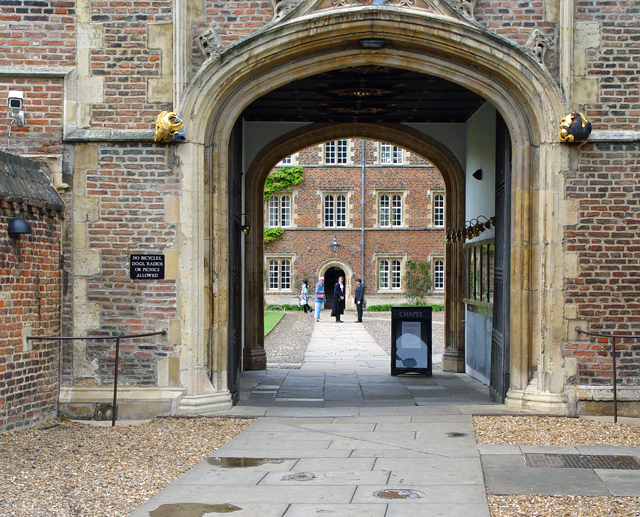
The Gatehouse looking into First Court

=== Entrance ===
The main entrance to Jesus College is a walled passage known as the "Chimney". The term is derived from the Middle French word cheminée, for "little path" or "little way". The Chimney leads directly to the Porter's Lodge and then into First Court. All the courts at the college, except for the cloister, are open on at least one side.

=== Libraries ===
==== Quincentenary Library ====
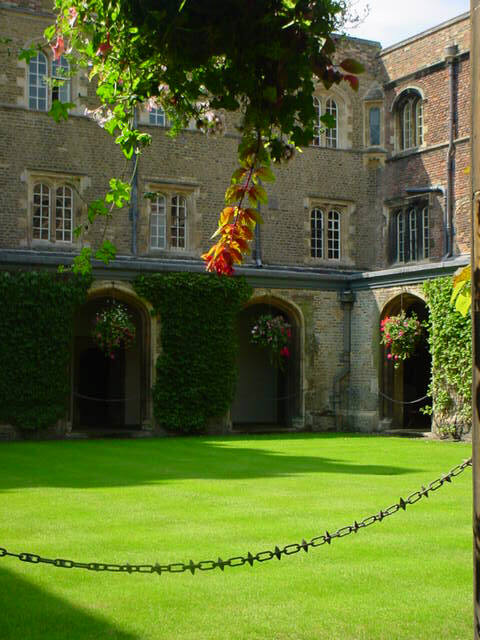
Cloister Court

The Quincentenary Library is the main library of Jesus College and is open 24 hours a day. The library was designed by Eldred Evans and David Shalev in commemoration of the 500th anniversary of the foundation of the college in 1996. Completion of the library was shortly followed by a new accommodation building in 2000, now known as Library Court. The Quincentenary Library has a particularly large law collection, housed in a law library on the ground floor.

==== Old Library ====
The Old Library was in regular use until 1912. It still contains over 9,000 books and is available to private researchers upon appointment. The Old Library includes the Malthus Collection, being the family collection of alumnus Thomas Malthus, famous for his study An Essay on the Principle of Population which influenced Charles Darwin.

=== College grounds ===
Jesus College has large sporting grounds on-site. These include football, rugby, cricket, tennis, squash, basketball and hockey pitches. The Jesus College Boat House is 400 yd (370 m) away, across Midsummer Common.

The college frequently hosts exhibitions of sculpture by contemporary artists. It has hosted work by Sir Antony Gormley, Sir Eduardo Paolozzi, and Barry Flanagan. The college grounds also include a nature trail, inspired by poetry composed by Samuel Taylor Coleridge during his time as a student.

Jesus College is one of the few colleges to allow anyone to walk on the lawns of its courts, except First Court, Cloister Court and those that are burial sites for nuns from the original nunnery.

A major addition to the College – the largest in modern times – is the West Court development, which was officially opened in October 2017 by HRH the Earl of Wessex. Its facilities include a 180-seat lecture theatre, medical teaching suite, guest and conference accommodation, a café, a bar, research space and student social areas.

The development is built on part of the site of Wesley House, the freehold of which had previously belonged to the College and was returned to it in 2014.

== Chapel and choir ==
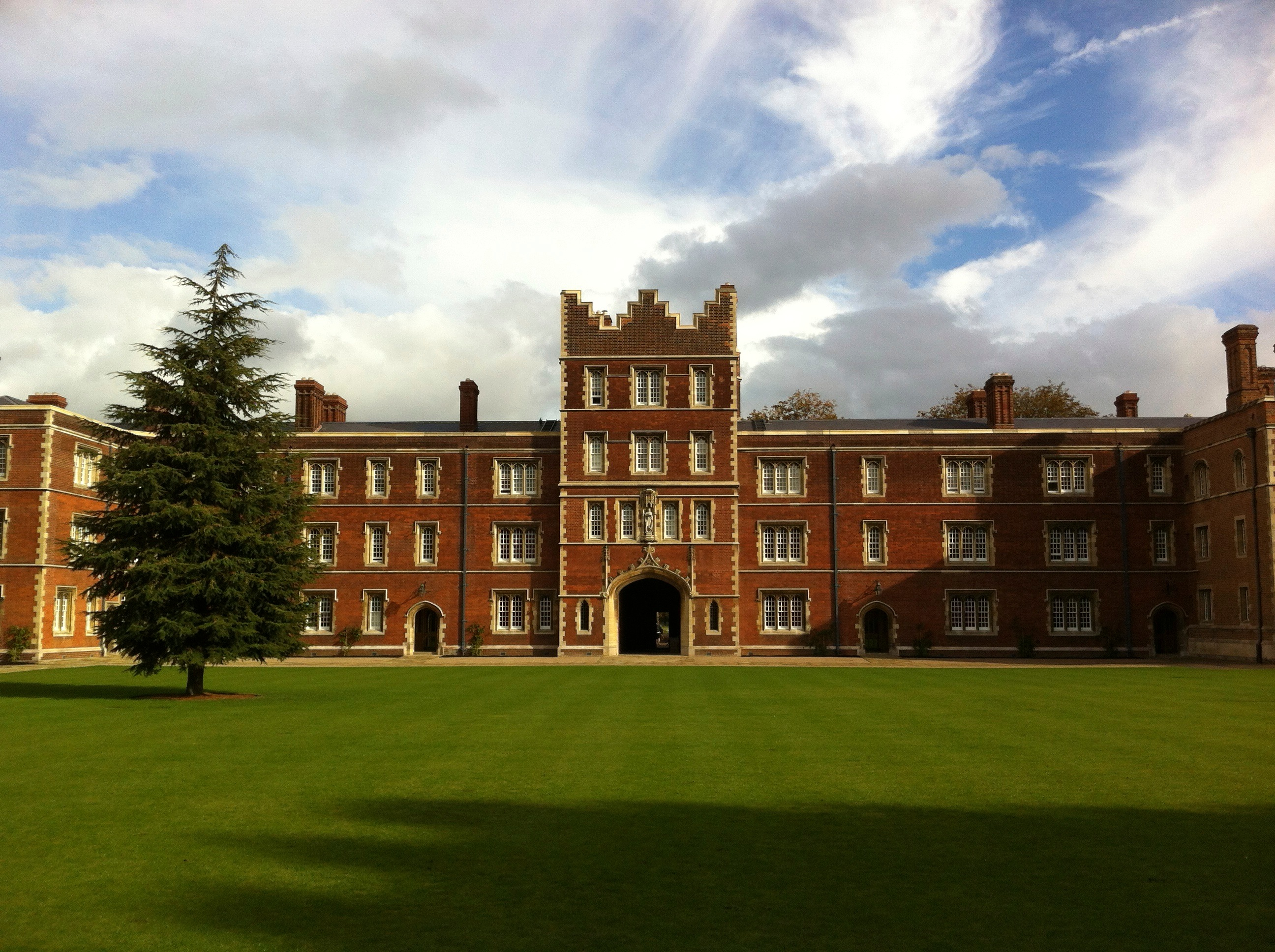
Chapel Court

=== Chapel ===
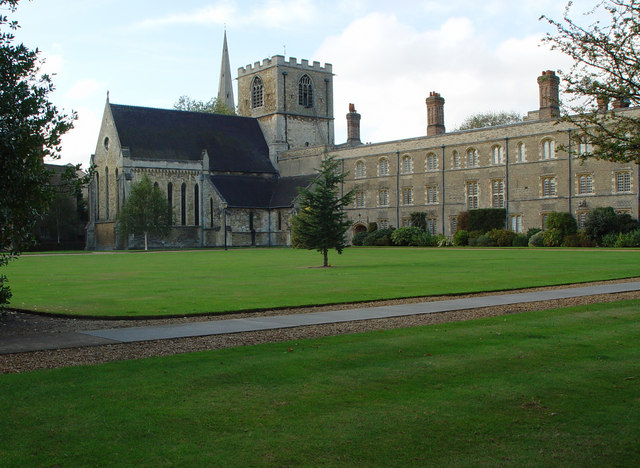
Jesus Chapel

The College Chapel was founded in 1157 and took until 1245 to complete, and is believed to be the oldest university building in Cambridge still in use. Originally it was the chapel of the Benedictine Convent of St. Mary and St. Radegund, which was dissolved by Bishop John Alcock.

The original structure of the chapel was cruciform in shape and the nave had both north and south aisles. A high, pitched roof was surmounted by a belfry and steeple; this collapsed in 1277. The chapel was also used as the parish church of St Radegund. Twice the chapel was ravaged by fire, in 1313 and 1376.

When the college took over the precincts during the 15th century, the parish was renamed after the college as Jesus parish, with the churchyard still being used for burials. This was short-lived, as by the middle of the 16th century Jesus' parish was absorbed into that of All Saints. Significant alterations were carried out to the church under Alcock, transforming the cathedral-sized church, which was the largest in Cambridge into a College chapel for a small group of scholars. A large part of the original nave was replaced by College rooms, and subsequently part of the Master's Lodge.

The misericords were created by the architect Augustus Pugin between 1849 and 1853. Pugin used fragments of the misericords dating from 1500, which had been preserved in the Master's Lodge as templates. Repairs were also undertaken by George Frederick Bodley between 1864 and 1867, who commissioned decorative schemes from Morris, Marshall, Faulkner & Co. The same firm returned in the 1870s to install stained glass.

Said and sung services are held every day during term. Choral Evensong takes place four times a week (Tuesdays, Thursdays, Saturdays and Sundays), and sung Eucharist on Sunday mornings. There are also Compline twice a term, as well as Masses on major holy days. The chapel, famed for its warm but clean acoustics, is also a much sought-after space for concerts and recitals, as well as recordings.

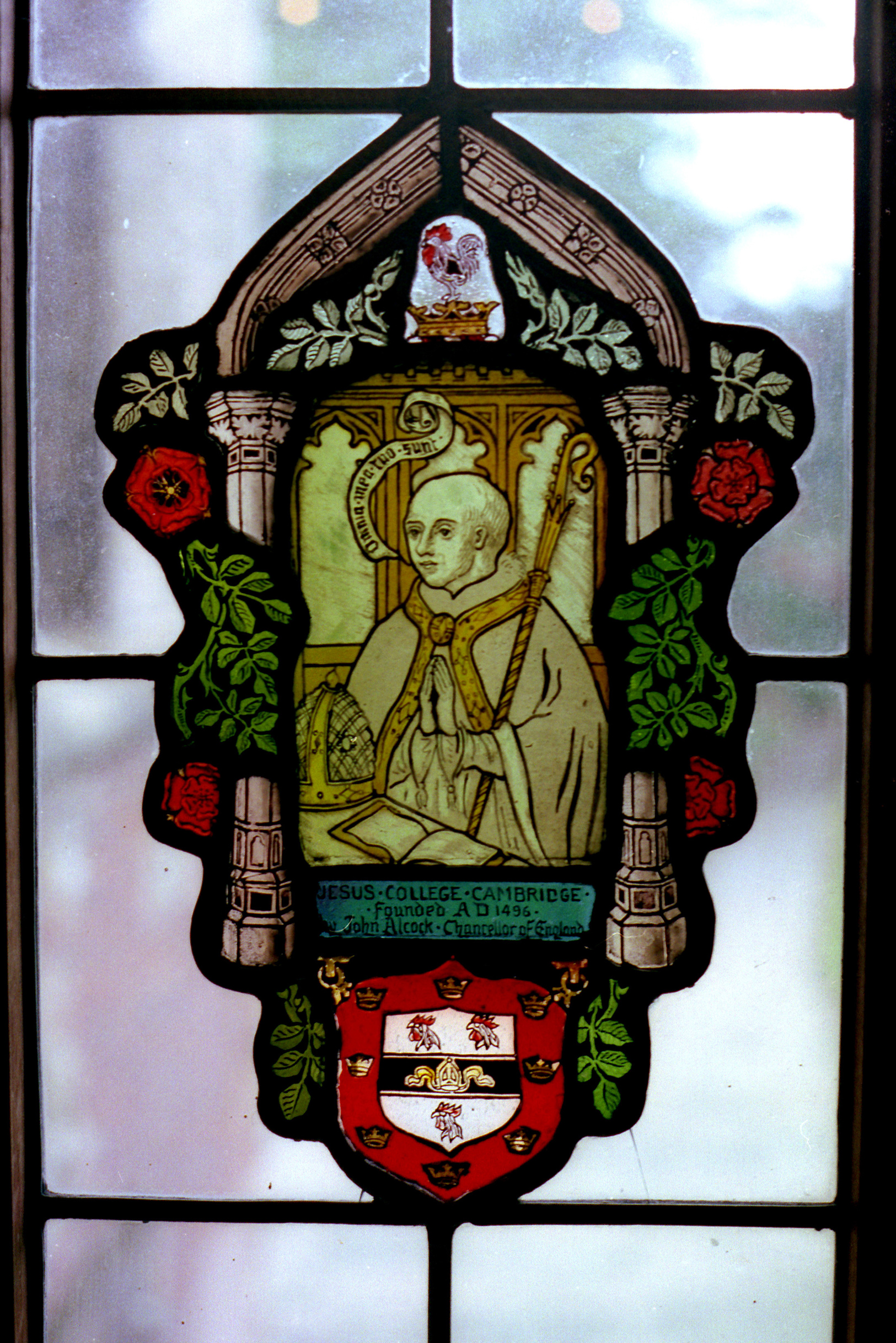
Stained glass of John Alcock

=== Choir ===
Jesus College maintains two choirs, the College Choir and the Chapel Choir.

- The College Choir consists of male and female students and sings regular services twice a week in the chapel. One of the leading choirs in Cambridge, its singers are mainly drawn from the college's students but also include singers from other colleges. Evensong is sung by the College Choir on Tuesdays at 6:30 pm and Sundays at 6:00 pm during Full Term; Sunday Eucharists are sung by a consort of singers from the College Choir.
- The Chapel Choir, which is likely to have existed since the foundation of the college, consists of around 20 younger choristers combined with the lower voices of the College Choir and also sings services twice a week in the chapel. It is unique among Cambridge college choirs in that the choristers are volunteers: that is, they are drawn from schools around the city and do not attend a particular choir school. The Chapel Choir sings Evensong on Thursdays and Saturdays at 6:30 pm.

Between September 2009 and December 2016 Mark Williams, former assistant organist at St Paul's Cathedral, served as director of music, being succeeded by Richard Pinel, former assistant organist at St George's Chapel, Windsor Castle and Organ Scholar at Magdalen College, Oxford, in January 2017. After Pinel's departure at the end of the 2022 academic year, Peter Wright served as acting director until the appointment of the current director Benjamin Sheen, who took up the post in January 2023. Former Organ Scholars who have held or currently hold director of music posts at British cathedrals include Malcolm Archer (Bristol Cathedral, Wells Cathedral and St Paul's Cathedral), Geraint Bowen (St Davids Cathedral and Hereford Cathedral), Charles Harrison (Chichester Cathedral), Peter Hurford (St Albans Cathedral), Richard Lloyd (Hereford Cathedral and Durham Cathedral) and James O'Donnell (Westminster Cathedral and Westminster Abbey).

== Student life ==
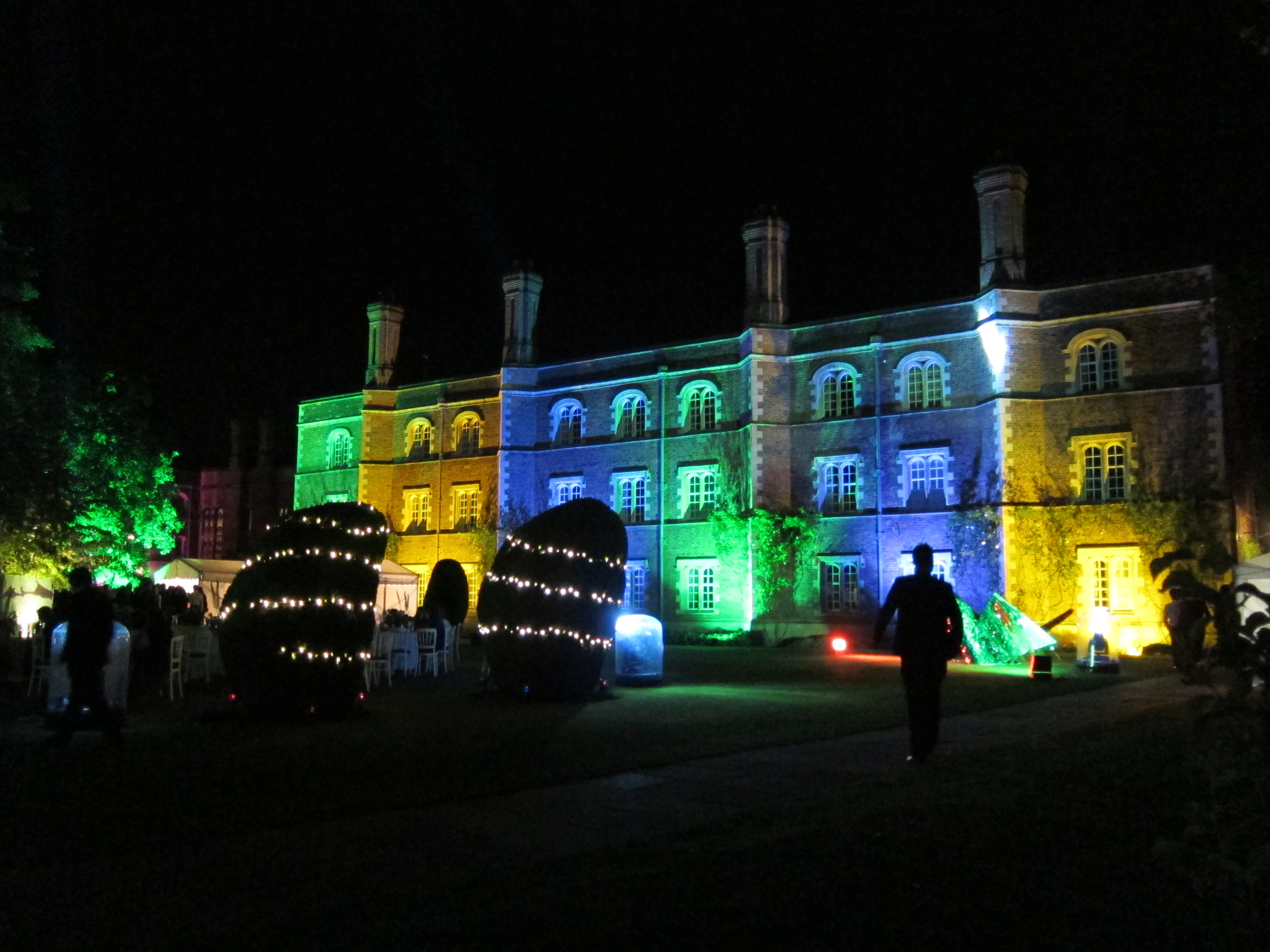
Jesus College May Ball, 2012

=== Student societies ===
Jesus College has two active student unions, the Jesus College Student Union (JCSU) and the Jesus College Graduate Union (MCR). These unions organise a wide range of social, cultural, welfare and sporting events throughout the year. The John Hughes Arts Festival, founded by College students in 2014 in memory of the late Dean of Chapel, John Hughes, runs annually, providing a broad programme of arts events.

Jesus College hosts an annual May Ball.

=== Sport ===
Jesus College offers sports, including rowing, football, rugby, hockey, tennis, squash and basketball. The college typically fields several teams in each sport. Jesus College Hockey Club (JCHC) counts 7 Cuppers wins in the last decade and a rise back to the top division in the 24/25 season, finishing a close second to bitter rival St John's and Newnham Colleges.

The Jesus College Boat Club is also particularly strong, with the 1st Men's VIII never having dropped below 12th place in the May Bumps and 11th position in the Lent Bumps. The JCBC organises the annual Fairbairn Cup Races.

=== Hall ===
A three-course dinner known as Formal Hall is served in the college's main dining hall five nights a week. Gowns are worn by all members of the college, along with lounge suits for men and formal dresses for women. A four-course dinner for graduate students of the college known as Grad Hall is served in Upper Hall each Wednesday. Unlike most traditional Oxbridge colleges, the college allows graduate students to dine at High Table on Tuesdays.

The college offers a canteen known as Caff, as well as brunches on Saturday and Sunday mornings. The college has a bar known as JBar.

== Masters and fellows ==
=== Masters ===
Sonita Alleyne was elected master of the college in 2019. She was preceded by Ian White, former Van Eck Professor of Engineering at the university. Previous masters of the college include:

- Robert Mair (2001–2011), former Sir Kirby Laing Professor of Civil Engineering at the university;
- David Crighton (1997–2000), former Professor of Applied Mathematics at the university;
- Baron Renfrew of Kaimsthorn (1986–1996), former Disney Professor of Archaeology at the university;
- Sir Alan Cottrell (1973–1986), former Goldsmiths' Professor of Materials Science and later Chief Scientific Adviser to the Prime Minister; and
- Sir Denys Page (1959–1973), former Regius Professor of Greek and President of the British Academy.

=== Fellows ===
Three members of the college have received Nobel Prizes. Philip W. Anderson was awarded the Nobel Prize in Physics (1977). Anderson was a fellow from 1969 to 1975 while he held a visiting professorship at the Cavendish Laboratory and has been an Honorary Fellow since 1978. Peter D. Mitchell, an undergraduate and later research student, was awarded the Nobel Prize in Chemistry (1978). He became an Honorary Fellow in 1979. Eric Maskin was a joint winner of the Nobel Prize in Economics in 2007. Maskin was a research fellow from 1976 to 1977 and has been an Honorary Fellow since 2009.

Several prominent figures in the law have been fellows of the college. Glanville Williams, a scholar of criminal law, was a Fellow from 1957 to 1978. The Glanville Williams Society, consisting of current and former members of Jesus College, meets annually in his honour. David Hayton, editor of Underhill and Hayton's Law of Trusts and Trustees and current judge of the Caribbean Court of Justice was a Fellow from 1973 to 1987. Robert Yewdall Jennings was a Fellow of the college and later Whewell Professor of International Law (1955–1982) before his appointment to the International Court of Justice (ICJ), where he served as a Judge (1982–1991) and later as President (1991–1995). James Crawford was also a Fellow of the college and later Whewhell Professor of International Law (1992–2014) before his appointment to the International Court of Justice in November 2014.

Educationalist Jason Arday was the 2002 Professorial Chair in the Sociology of Education at the Faculty of Education and a Fellow of the College from 2023 until his resignation following the exposure of academic dishonesty in 2026.

Current Honorary Fellows include Roger Toulson, Lord Toulson of the Supreme Court of the United Kingdom, Sir Rupert Jackson of the Court of Appeal, and Sir Colman Treacy, also of the Court of Appeal, all of whom were students of the college.

Honorary fellows include Stormzy, Dame Sandra Dawson; Sir Anthony Gormley; Anthony Gubbay; Sir David Hare; Martin Rees, Baron Rees of Ludlow; Colin Renfrew, Baron Renfrew of Kaimsthorn; Robin Renwick, Baron Renwick of Clifton; Sir Bernard Silverman; Richard Tuck; and Alan Watson, Baron Watson of Richmond.

== Notable alumni ==
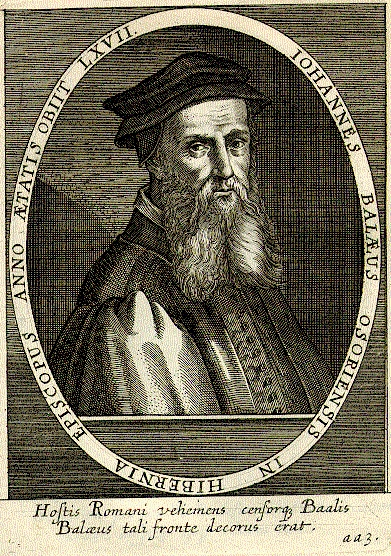
John Bale, controversial historian, playwright and Bishop of Ossory

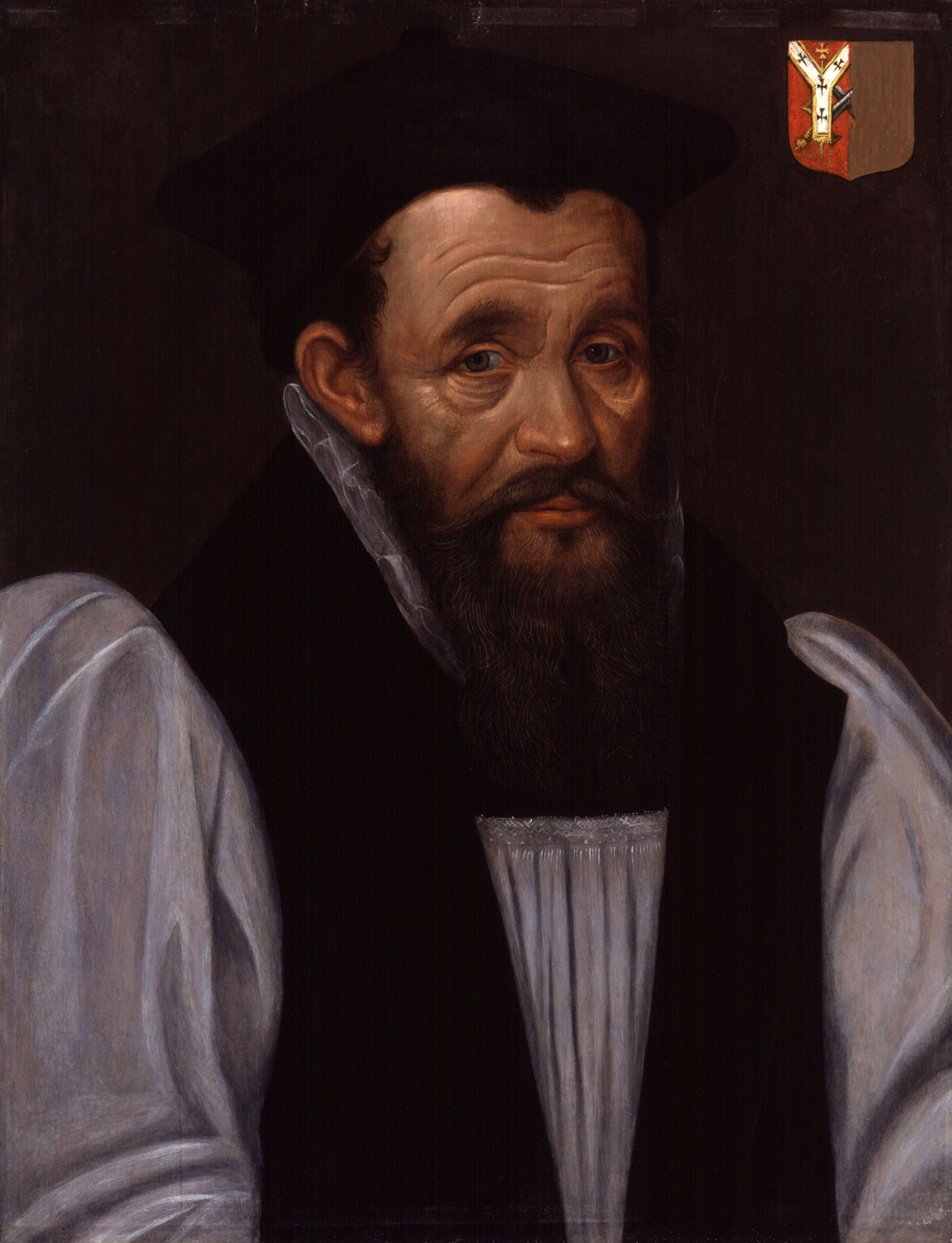
Richard Bancroft, Archbishop of Canterbury, chief overseer of the production of the King James Bible

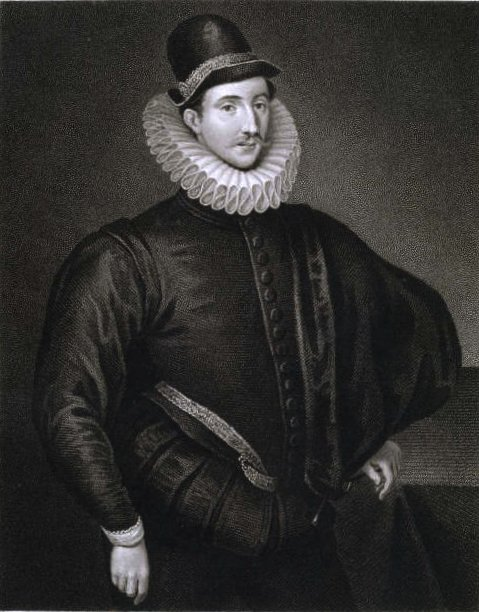
Fulke Greville, 1st Baron Brooke, Elizabethan poet, dramatist and statesman

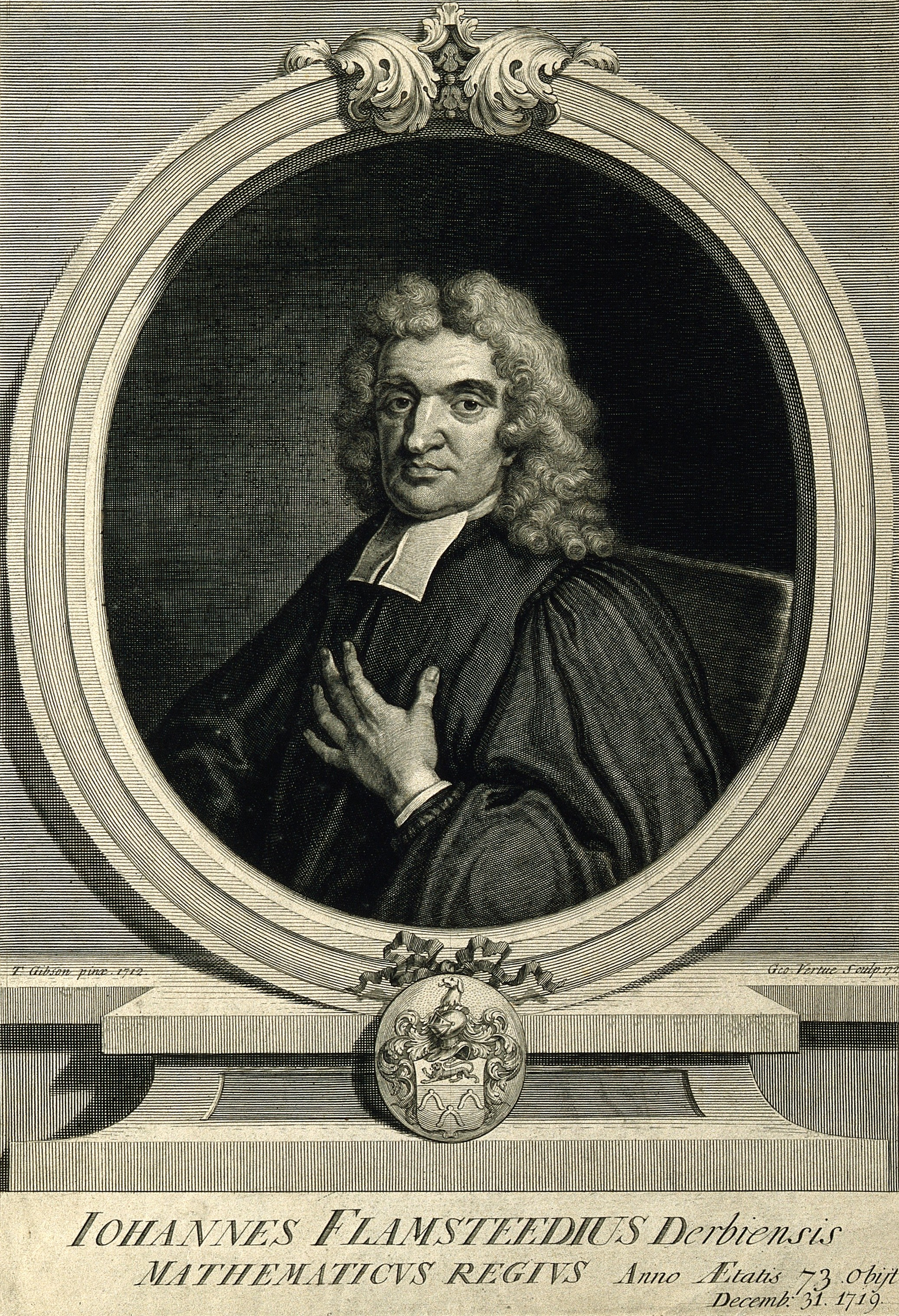
John Flamsteed, the English astronomer and first Astronomer Royal

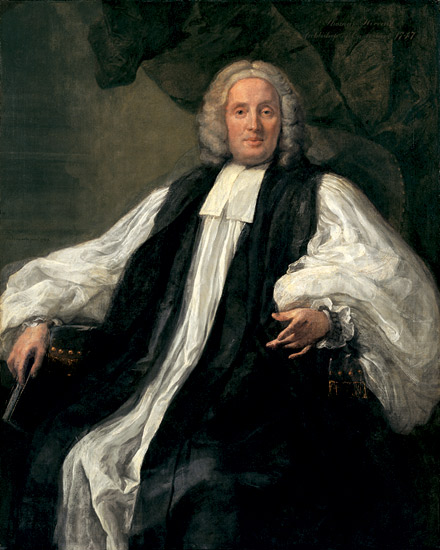
Thomas Herring, Archbishop of Canterbury, noted Whig and Hanoverian supporter

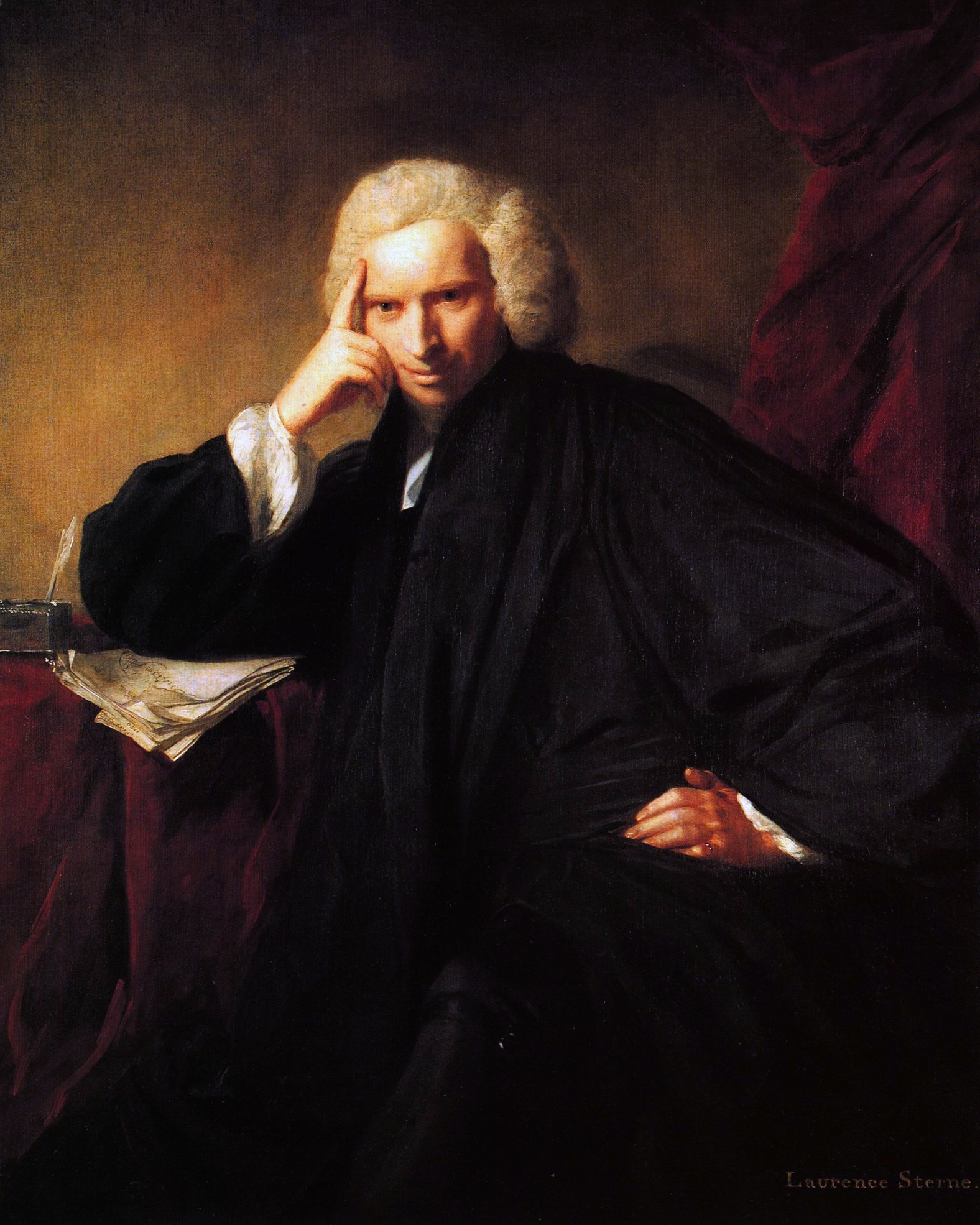
Laurence Sterne, Irish novelist and Anglican clergyman

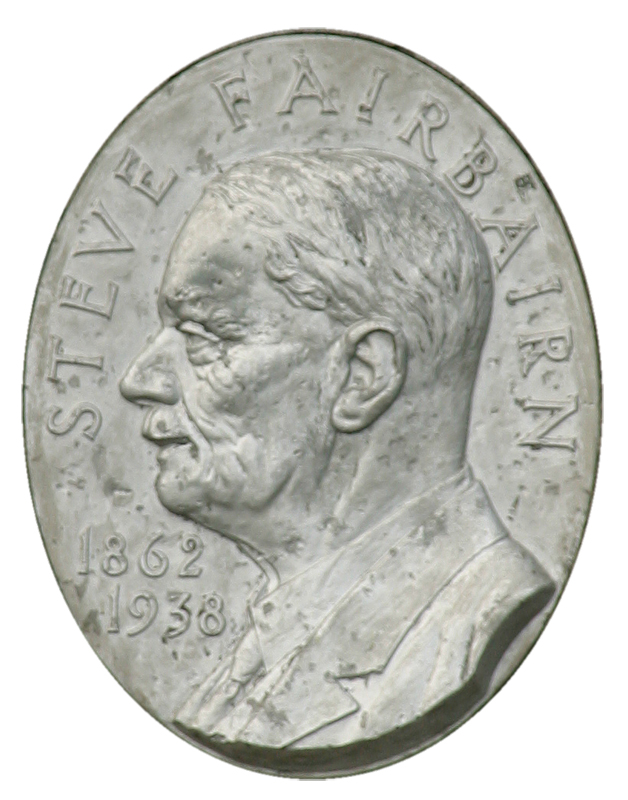
Steve Fairbairn, Australian rower and influential rowing coach

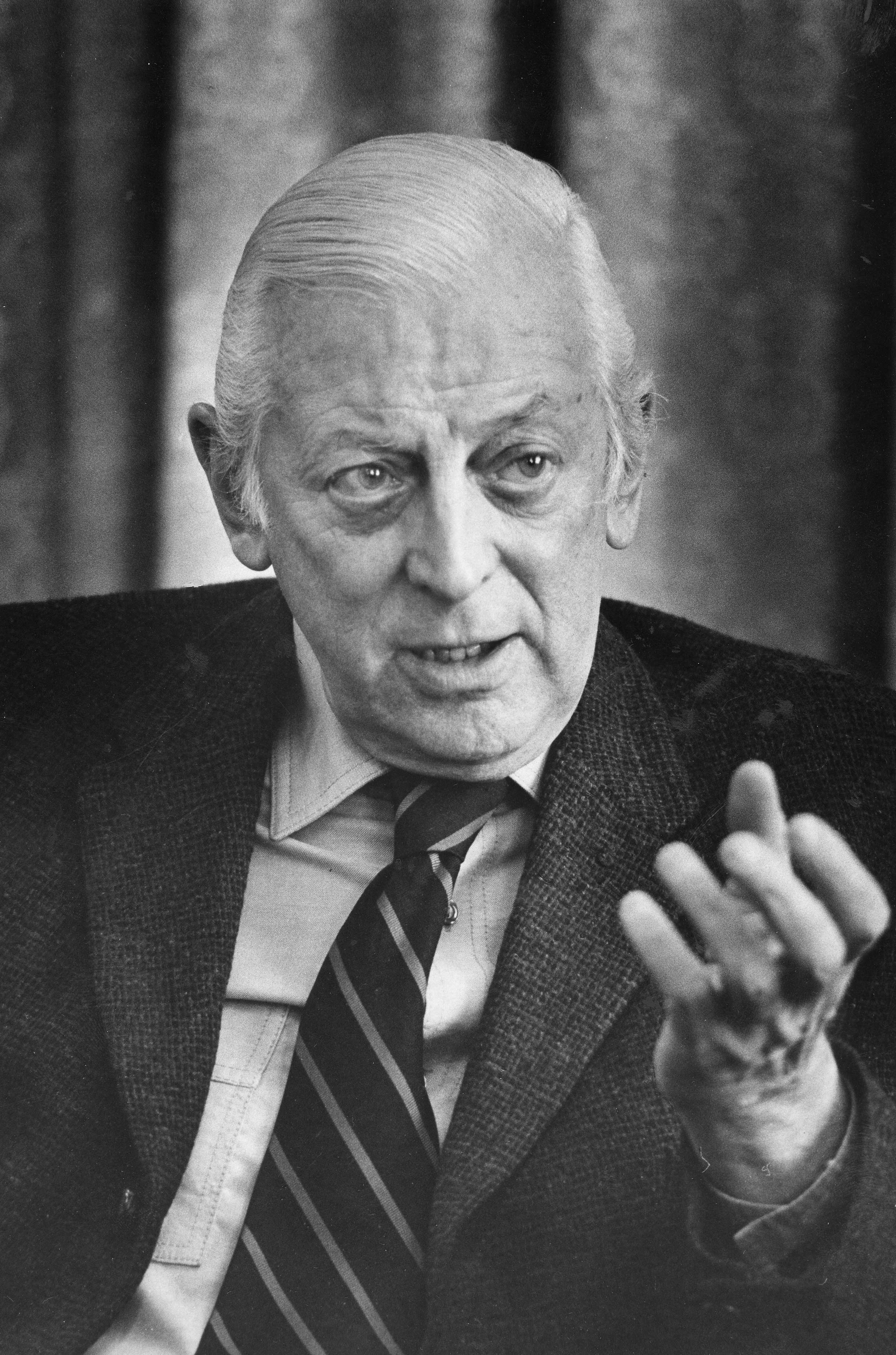
Alistair Cooke, British/American journalist

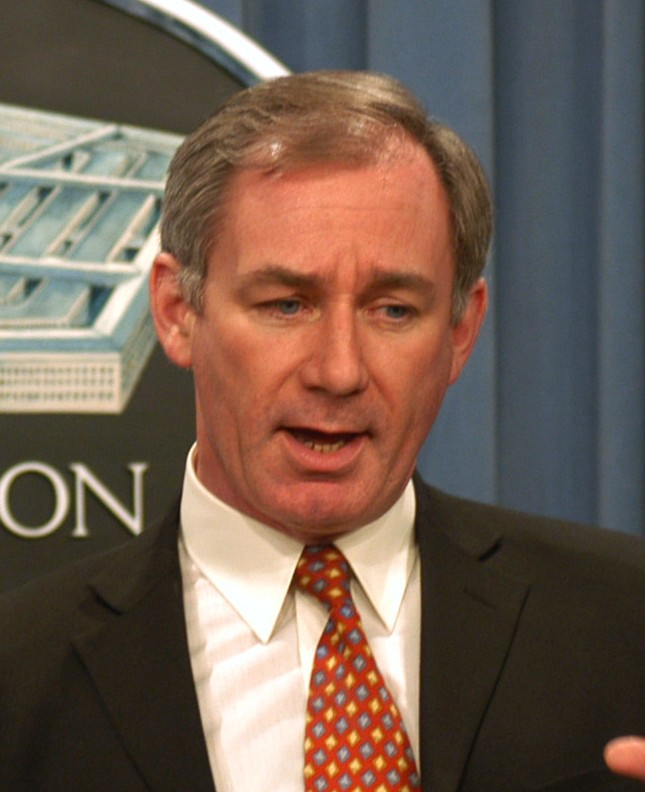
Geoff Hoon, former Defence Secretary, Transport Secretary, Leader of the House of Commons and Labour Party Chief Whip

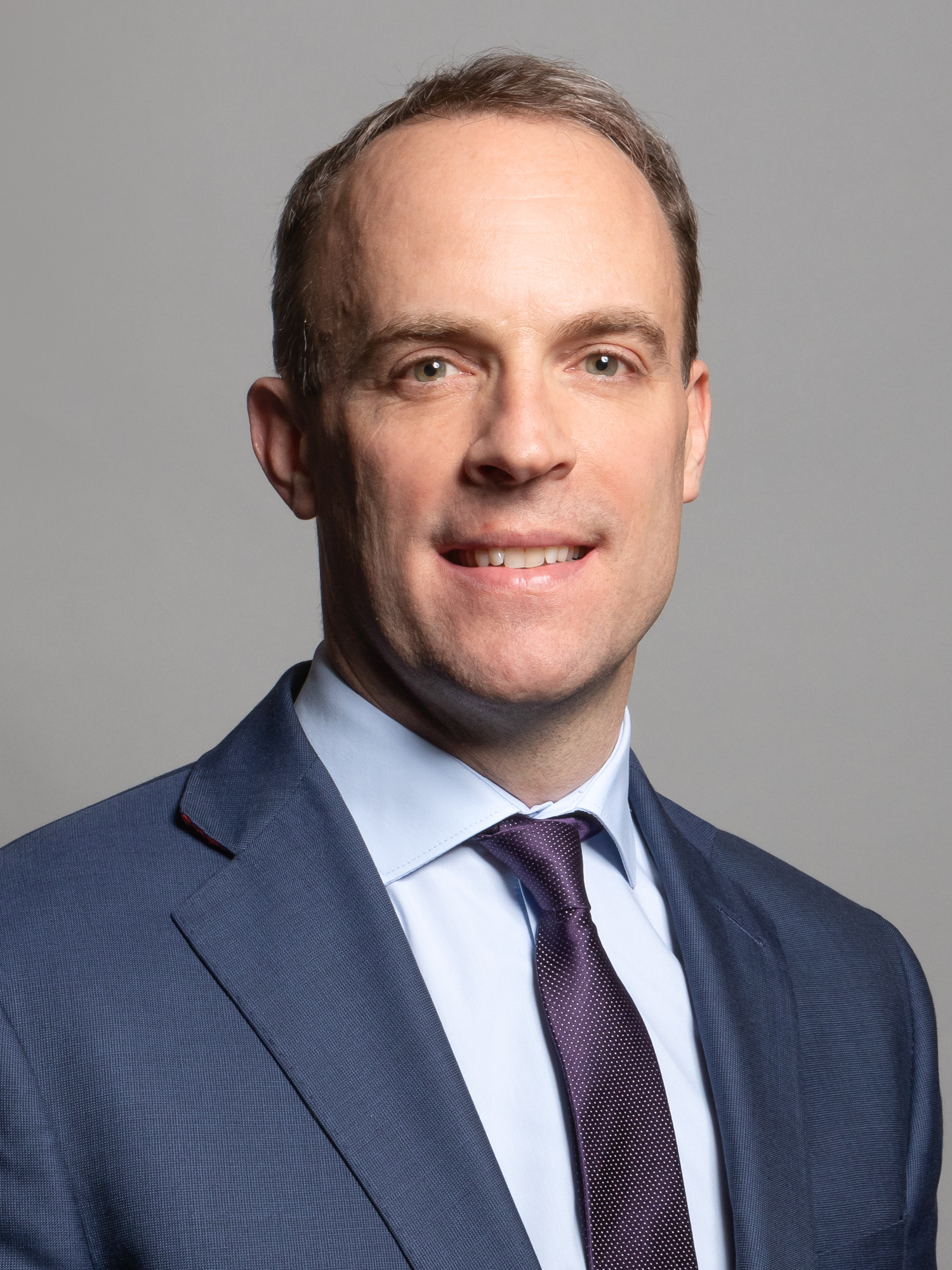
Dominic Raab, former Deputy Prime Minister of the United Kingdom, Secretary of State for Justice, Lord Chancellor, current Conservative party MP

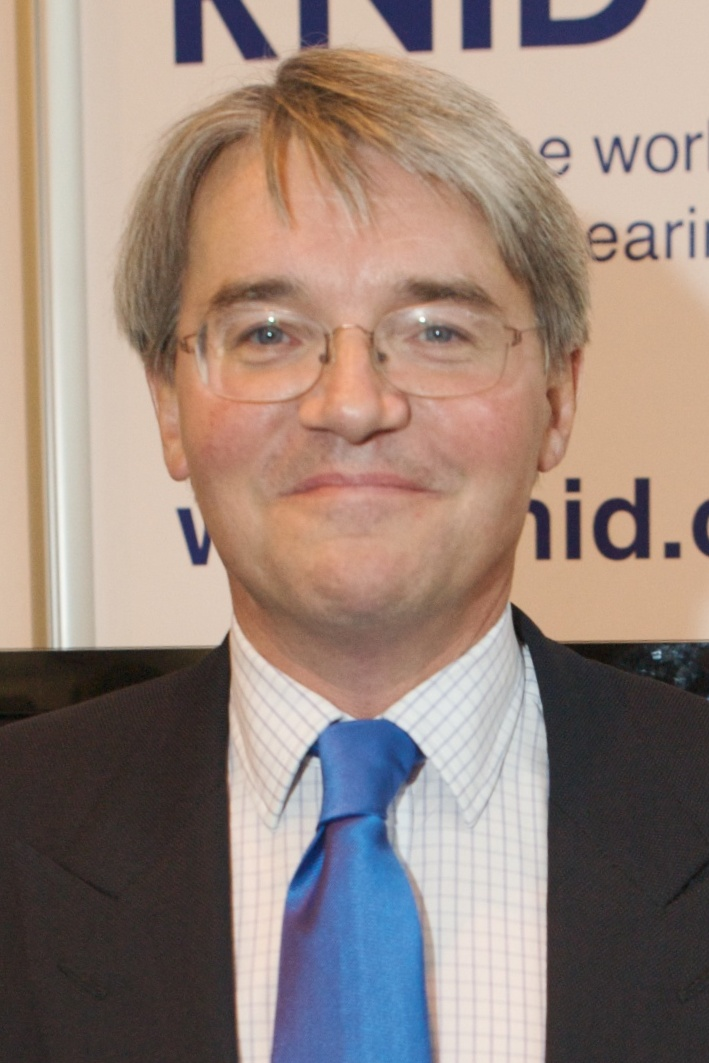
Andrew Mitchell, Conservative MP

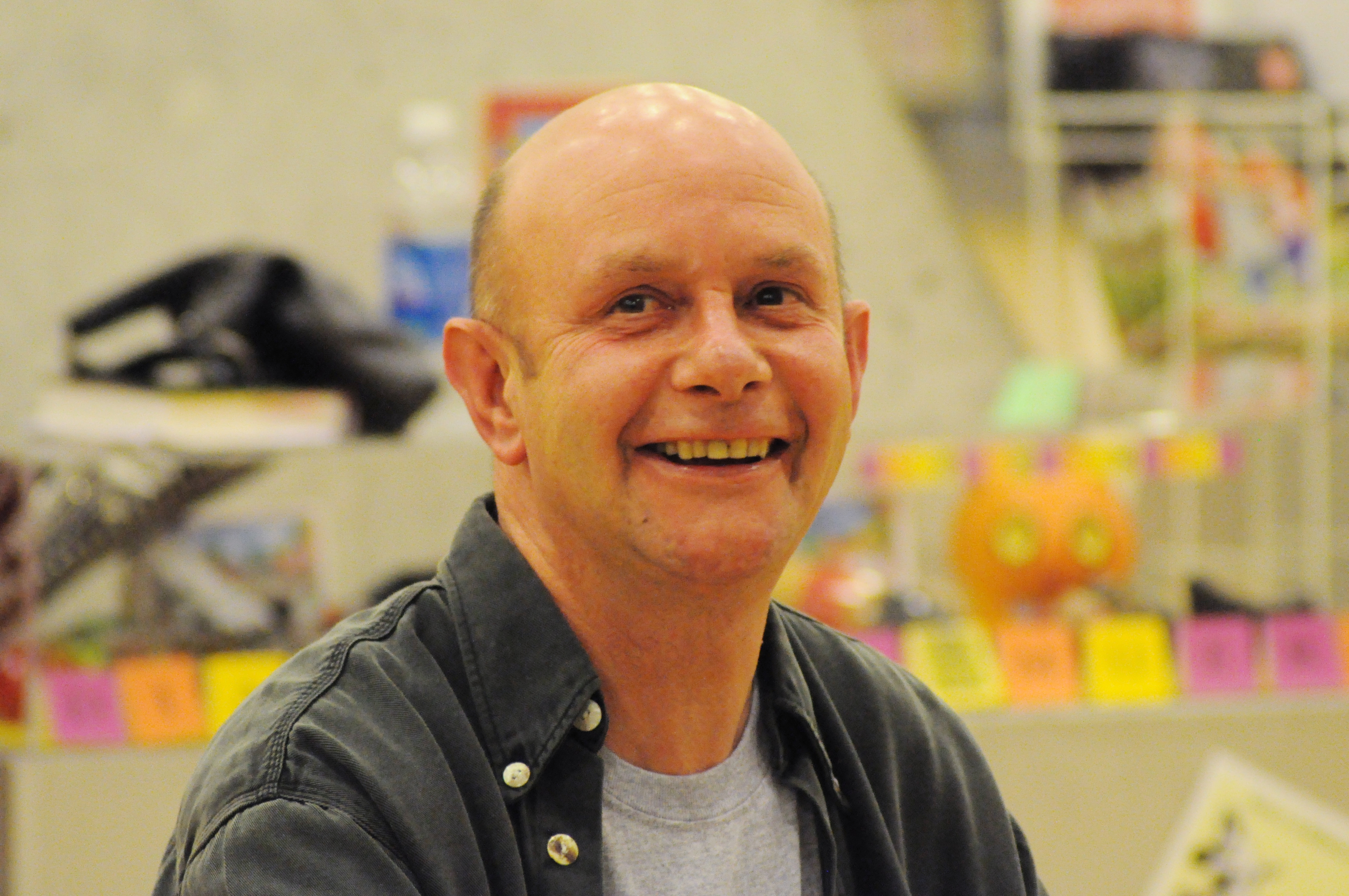
Nick Hornby, English novelist, author of About a Boy

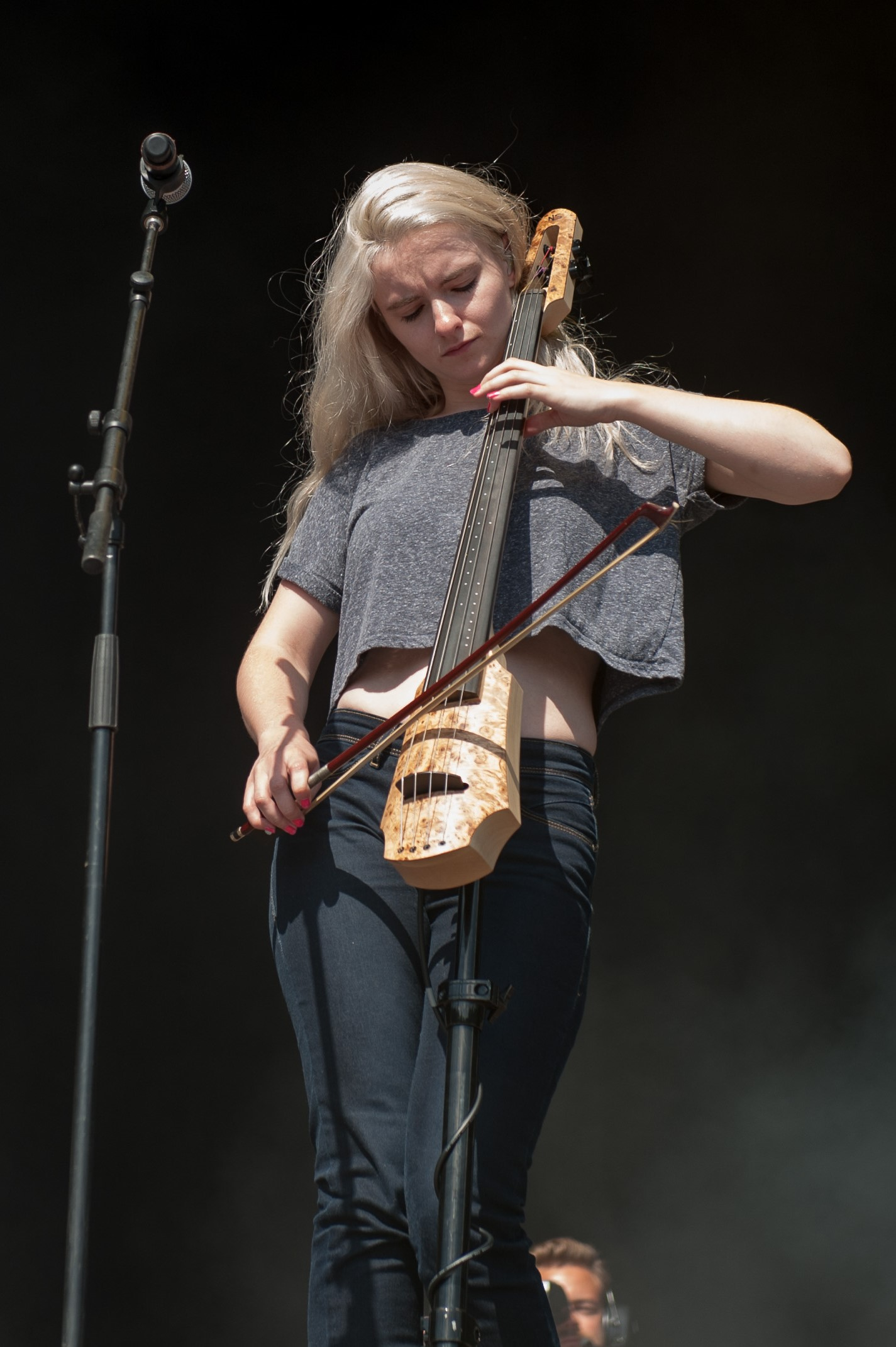
Grace Chatto, member of the band Clean Bandit, who were all educated at the college

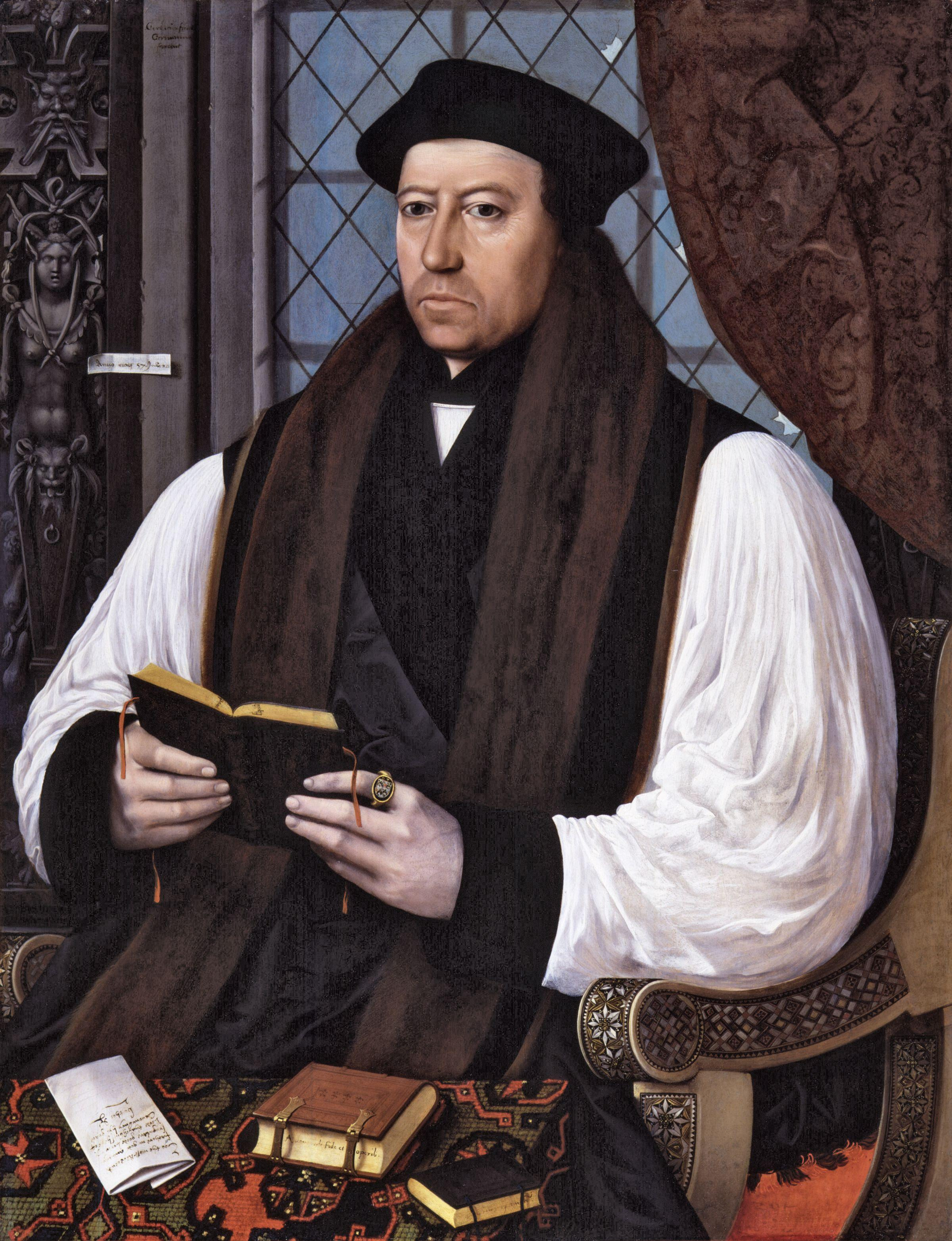
Thomas Cranmer, the first Protestant Archbishop of Canterbury, responsible for the Book of Common Prayer, attended the college from 1503, at the age of fourteen.

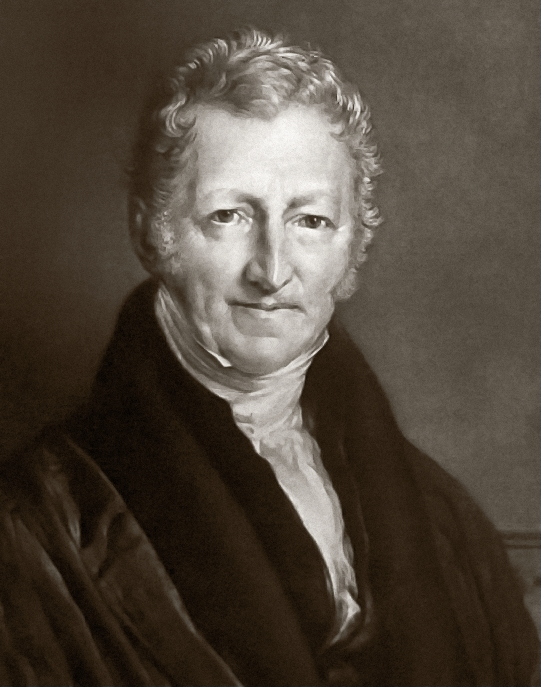
Robert Malthus, British scholar, philosopher, economist and population theorist, was admitted to the college in 1784, and elected a Fellow in 1793.

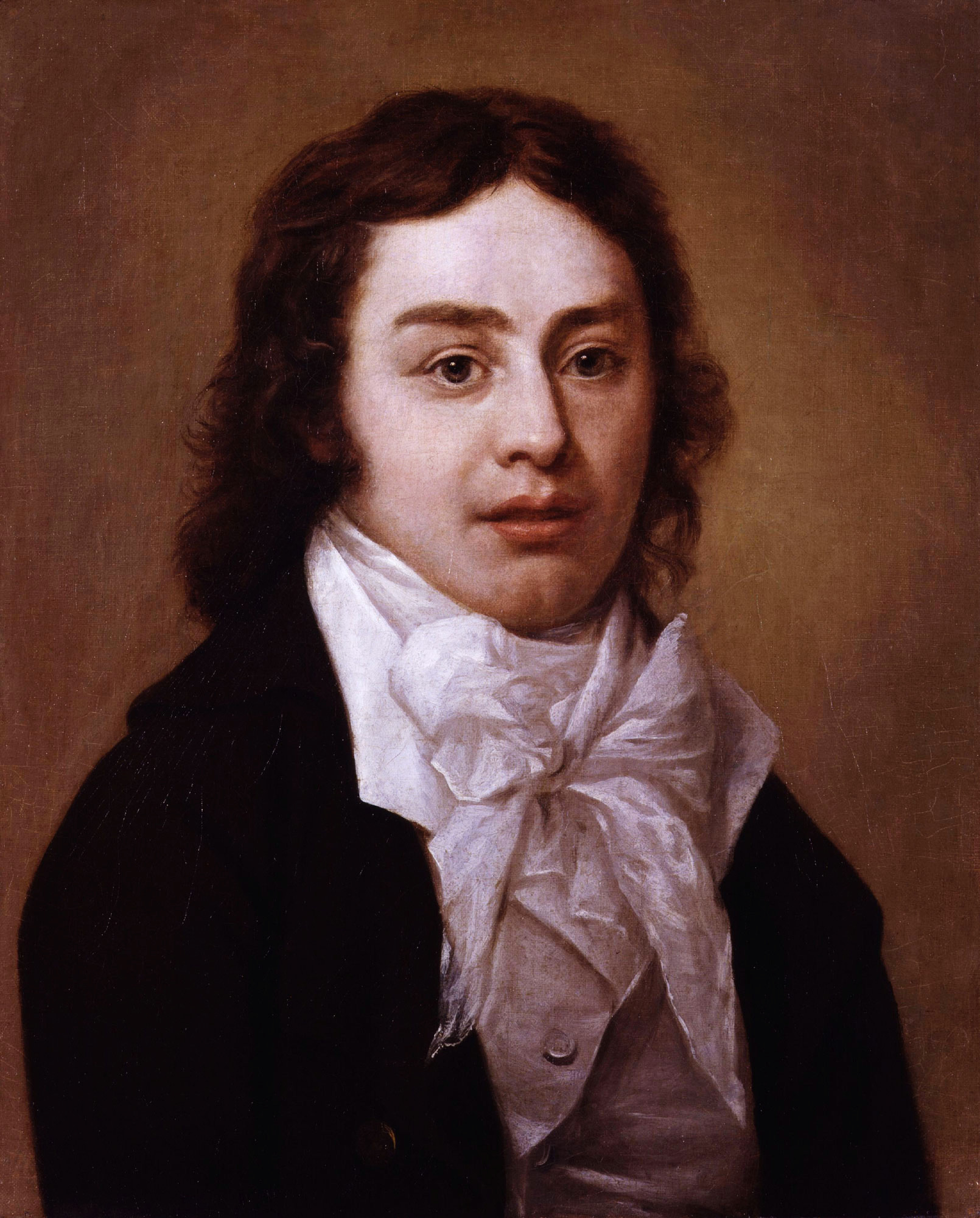
The English poet and Romantic, Samuel Taylor Coleridge

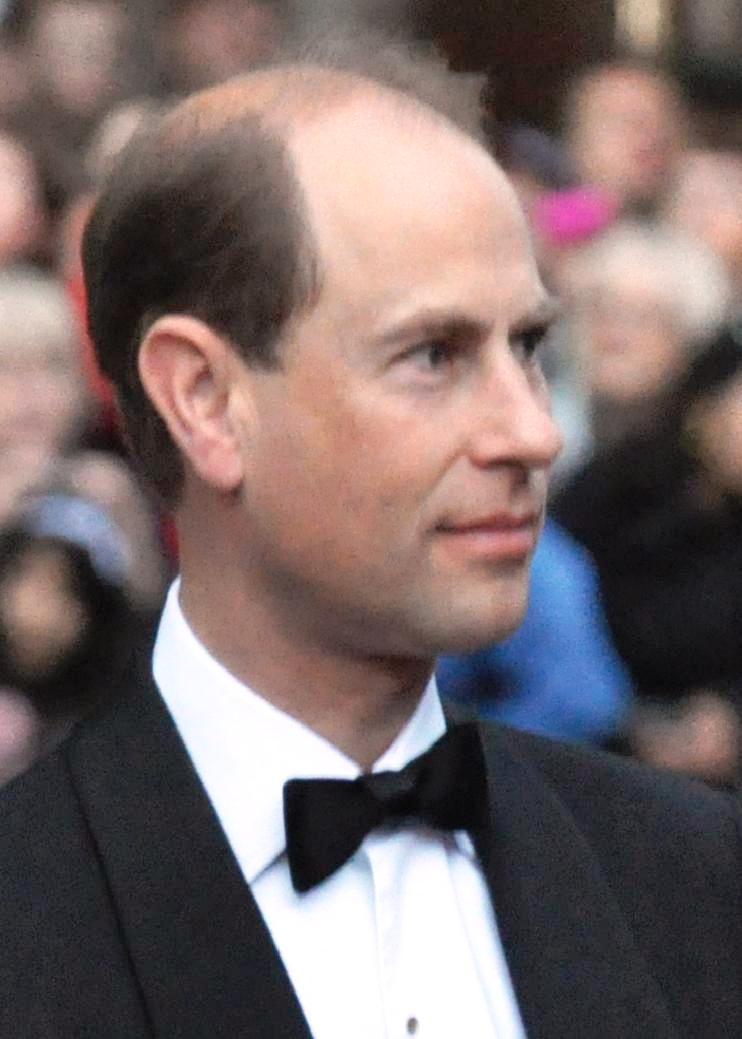
Prince Edward, Duke of Edinburgh, the fourth and youngest child of Queen Elizabeth II

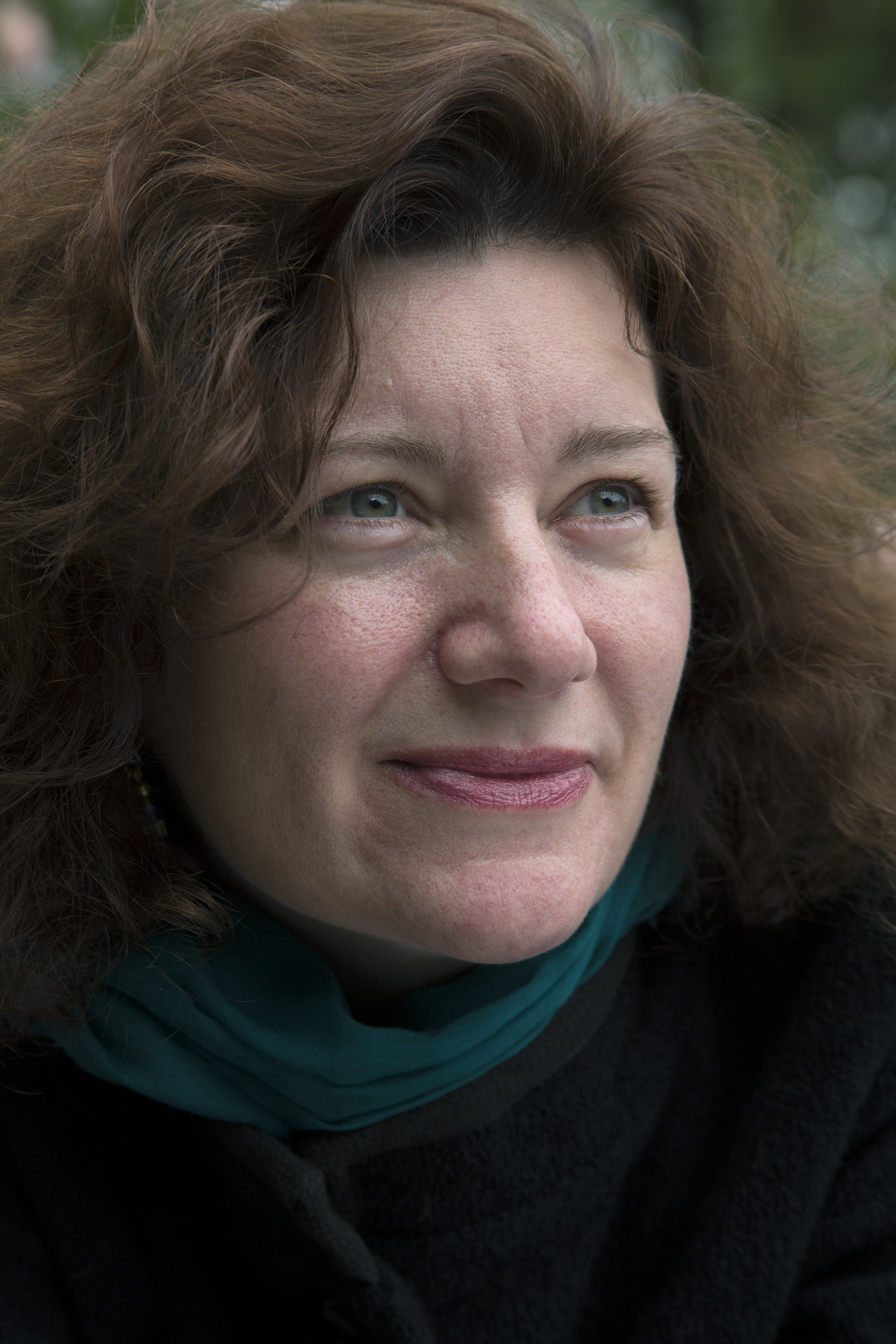
Turi King, Professor of Public engagement and Genetics

List of notable alumni
Name	Born	Died	Details
Double dates may indicate Old Style and New Style dates.
Thomas Cranmer	1489	1556	Archbishop of Canterbury
John Bale	1495	1563	Bishop of Ossory
Thomas Goodrich	1494	1554	Bishop of Ely
Arthur Golding	1535/6	1606	Protestant propagandist
Fulke Greville, 1st Baron Brooke	1554	1628	Elizabethan poet, playwright, statesman and biographer of Sir Philip Sidney
Sir Robert Cotton, 1st Baronet, of Connington	1570/1	1631	Antiquarian, MP and founder of the Cotton Library.
Thomas Beard		1632	English cleric, theologian, Puritan and schoolmaster of Oliver Cromwell.
Francis Higginson	1588	1630	Early Puritan minister in Colonial New England, and first minister of Salem, Massachusetts.
Richard Sterne	1596	1683	Archbishop of York, Master of Jesus College (1634)
John Eliot	1604	1690	Puritan missionary who translated the Bible into Algonquian.
Sir Richard Fanshawe, 1st Baronet	1608	1666	English diplomat, translator and poet.
John Strype	1643	1737	English cleric, historian and biographer
William Beale	1784	1854	Master of Jesus College (1632)
John Flamsteed	1646	1719	First Astronomer Royal
Thomas Herring	1693	1757	Archbishop of Canterbury
Matthew Hutton	1693	1758	Archbishop of Canterbury
John Jortin	1698	1770	Ecclesiastical historian
David Hartley	1705	1757	Philosopher
Laurence Sterne	1713	1768	Novelist
Henry Venn	1725	1797	A leader of the Evangelical movement in the Church of England
Gilbert Wakefield	1756	1801	Principal of two nonconformist academies
Thomas Robert Malthus	1766	1834	Population theorist
William Otter	1768	1840	First Principal of King's College London
Samuel Taylor Coleridge	1772	1834	Poet, critic and philosopher
David Barttelot	1821	1852	Cricketer
James Wemyss	1828	1909	Politician
William Percy Carpmael	1853	1936	Founder of the Barbarians' Rugby Club
Sandford Schultz	1857	1937	England cricketer
Charles Whibley	1859	1930	Journalist and author
Herbert Williams	1860	1937	Bishop of Waiapu, New Zealand
Steve Fairbairn	1862	1938	Rowing coach
Sir Arthur Quiller-Couch	1863	1944	Novelist and critic
Henry Hutson	1868	1916	Cricketer
Gregor MacGregor	1869	1919	Scotland Rugby Union player and England cricketer
Bertram Fletcher Robinson	1870	1907	Author, journalist and editor
John Maxwell Edmonds	1875	1958	Classicist, poet. dramatist and writer of celebrated epitaphs
Robert Stanford Wood	1886	1963	First Vice-Chancellor of the University of Southampton
Bernard Vann	1887	1918	Recipient of the Victoria Cross and League footballer for Derby County from 1906 to 1907
Sir Harold Scott	1887	1969	Commissioner of the Metropolitan Police Service from 1945 to 1953
E. M. W. Tillyard	1889	1962	Literary critic, master (1945–1959)
Hon. F. S. G. Calthorpe	1892	1935	England cricket captain
Sir Chintaman Dwarakanath Deshmukh	1896	1982	First Indian Governor of the Reserve Bank of India, Finance Minister in the Union Cabinet
Tom Lowry	1898	1976	New Zealand cricket captain
Alistair Cooke	1908	2004	Broadcaster
Jacob Bronowski	1908	1974	Scientist and mathematician
Tom Killick	1907	1953	England cricketer
Lord (Saville) Garner	1908	1983	British High Commissioner to Canada, Head of the Diplomatic Service
James Reeves	1909	1978	Author and literary critic
Don Siegel	1912	1991	American film director and producer
David Clive Crosbie Trench	1915	1988	24th Governor of Hong Kong
Peter Mitchell	1920	1992	Biochemist; won the 1978 Nobel Prize for Chemistry for his discovery of the chemiosmotic mechanism of ATP synthesis
Sir John Jardine Paterson	1920	2000	Businessman in India
Raymond Williams	1921	1988	Literary and cultural critic
Harry Johnson	1923	1977	Economist
Edwin Boston	1924	1986	Clergyman and steam enthusiast
Maurice Cowling	1926	2005	Historian of "high politics"
Harold Perkin	1926	2004	Social historian
J. B. Steane	1928	2011	Music critic and musicologist
Antony Armstrong-Jones, 1st Earl of Snowdon	1930	2017	Photographer and film-maker and ex-husband to the late Princess Margaret, Queen Elizabeth II's sister
Peter Hurford	1930	2019	Organist and composer
David McCutchion	1930	1972	Academic
Michael Podro	1931	2008	Art historian
Richard Hey Lloyd	1933	2021	Organist and composer
Ted Dexter	1935	2021	England cricket captain
Peter G. Fletcher	1936	1996	British conductor and author
Colin Renfrew, Baron Renfrew of Kaimsthorn	1937		Archaeologist
Herb Elliott	1938		Athlete; gold medallist in the 1500 metres at the 1960 Summer Olympics
Barry Kay	1939	2020	Immunologist
Fernando Vianello	1939	2009	Italian economist
Deryck Murray	1943		West Indies cricketer
Lisa Jardine	1944	2015	Historian
Roger Scruton	1944	2020	Philosopher
Paul Harrison	1945		Founder of the World Pantheist Movement, UNEP Global 500 Roll of Honour, author
Roger Toulson	1946	2017	Justice of the Supreme Court of the United Kingdom
Sir David Hare	1947		Playwright
Stefan Collini	1947		Literary critic and historian
Sir Rupert Jackson	1948		Justice of the Court of Appeal of England and Wales
Simon Hornblower	1949		Professor of Classics and Grote Professor of Ancient History, University College London
Aidan Bellenger	1950		Historian, former abbot of Downside Abbey.
Tony Wilson	1950	2007	Journalist, founder of Factory Records
David Wootton	1950		Lord Mayor of London
Kimberley Rew	1951		Songwriter and guitarist
Malcolm Archer	1952		Director of Chapel Music at Winchester College
Bernard Silverman	1952		British statistician and Master of St Peter's College, Oxford.
Geoff Hoon	1953		Former Secretary of State for Defence, Chief Whip, Secretary to the Treasury and Secretary of State for Transport
Anthony Julius	1956		British lawyer
Andrew Mitchell	1956		Secretary of State for International Development (from May 2010)
Nick Hornby	1957		Novelist and journalist
Shaun Woodward	1958		British politician, former Secretary of State for Northern Ireland
John Baron	1959		British Conservative politician
James O'Donnell	1961		Organist and Master of the Choristers of Westminster Abbey
Theodore Huckle	1962		Counsel General for Wales
Glen Goei	1962		Film and theatre director
Quentin Letts	1963		British journalist, currently writing for the New Statesman
Andrew Solomon	1963		Writer and professor of Clinical Psychology; winner of the 2001 National Book Award and Pulitzer Prize finalist
Prince Edward	1964		Duke of Edinburgh
James Wood	1965		Literary critic
Philip Hensher	1965		Novelist and journalist
Stephanie Theobald	1966		Novelist and journalist
Lewis Pugh	1969		Endurance swimmer and Ocean advocate
Turi King	1969		Professor of Public engagement and Genetics at the University of Leicester
Giles Dilnot	1971		Television presenter and journalist
Charles Harrison	1974		Organist and Master of the Choristers of Chichester Cathedral
Ros Atkins	1974		Journalist
Dominic Sandbrook	1974		Historian
Alexis Taylor	1980		Musician with Hot Chip, composer, singer
Grace Chatto	1985		Musician with Clean Bandit and Massive Violins, singer
Jason Forbes	1990		Actor, comedian

== See also ==
- List of organ scholars at British Universities
- Okukor, a Benin bronze
- Tobias Rustat
