= Southern Cathedrals Festival =

Music festival

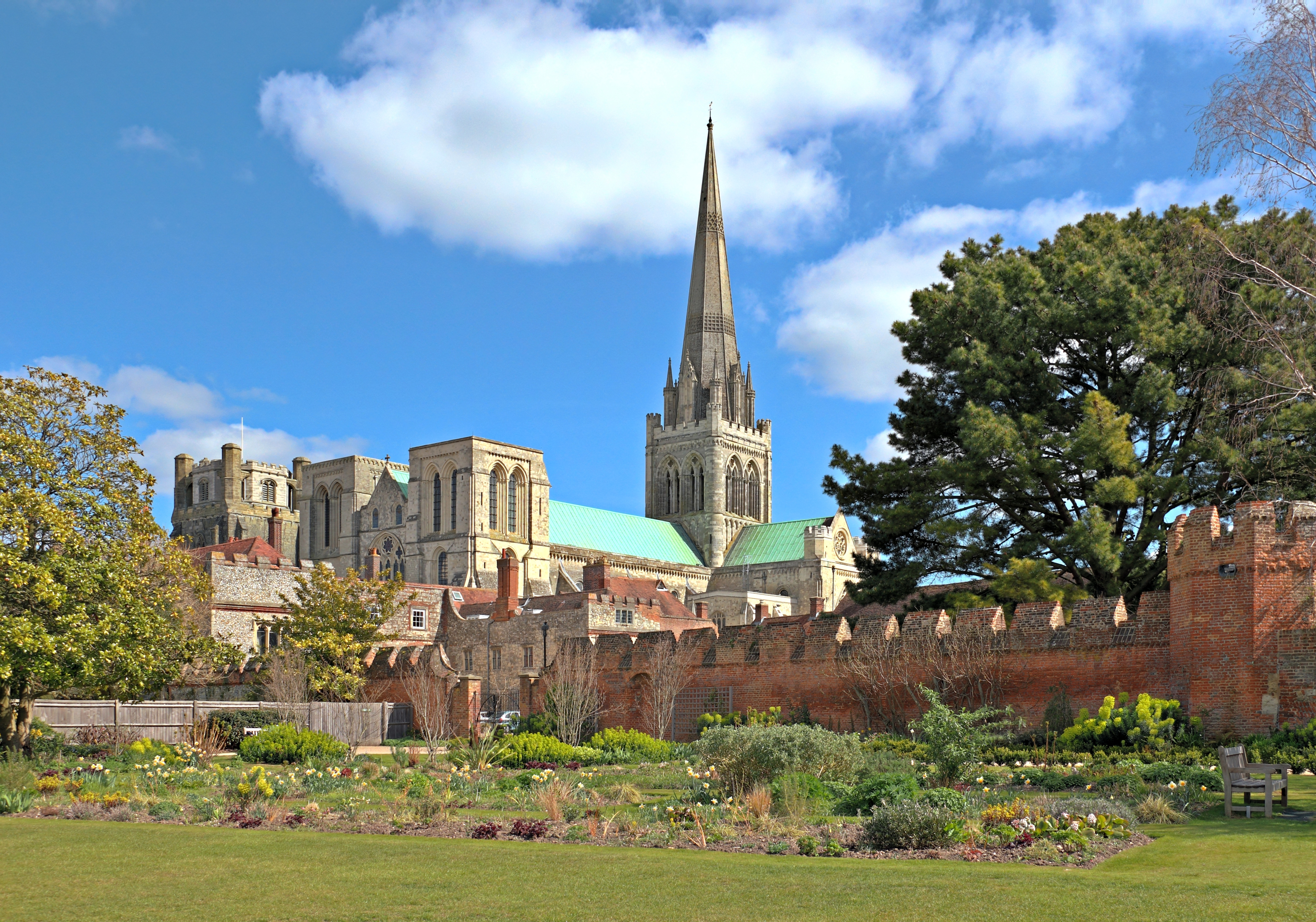
Chichester

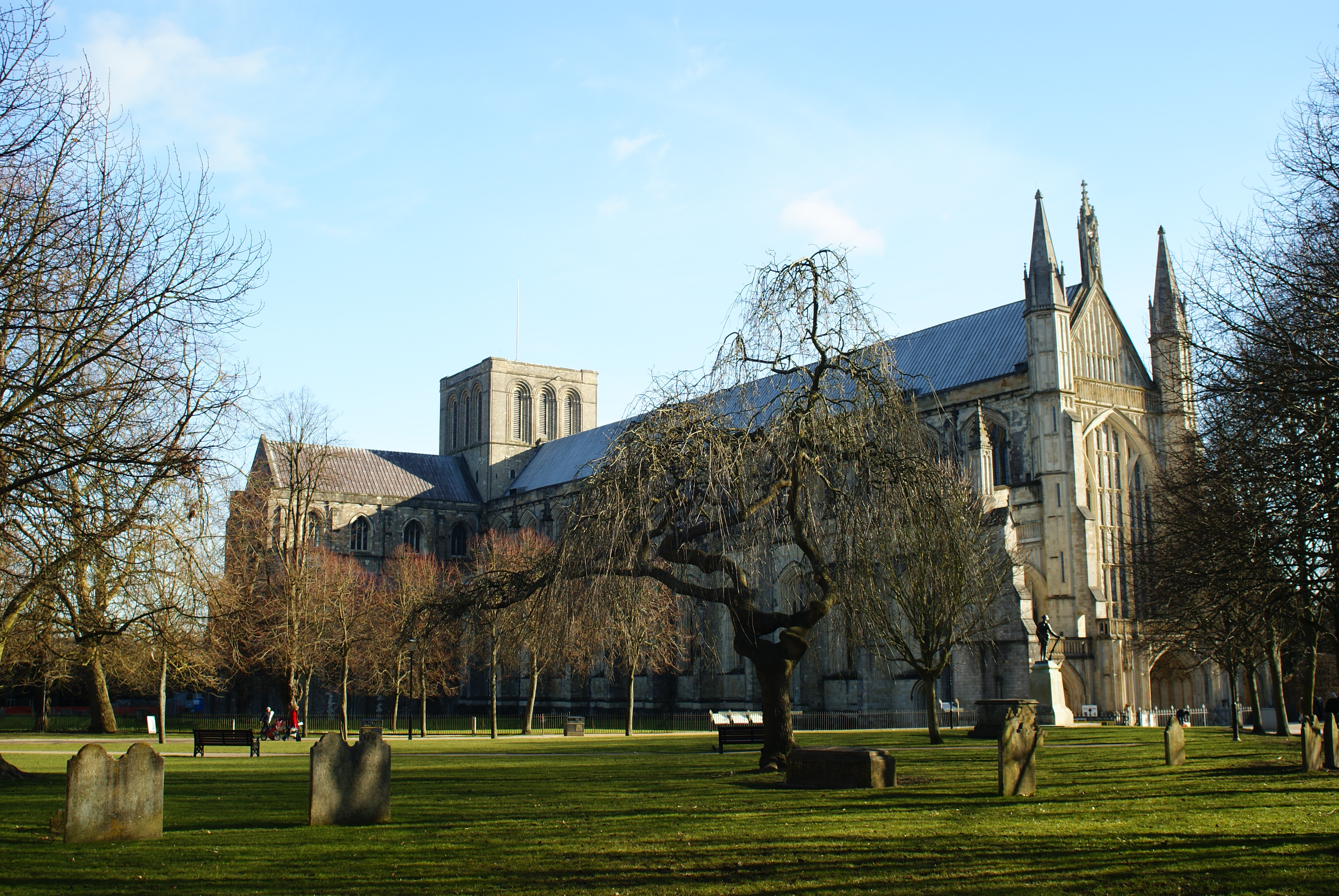
Winchester

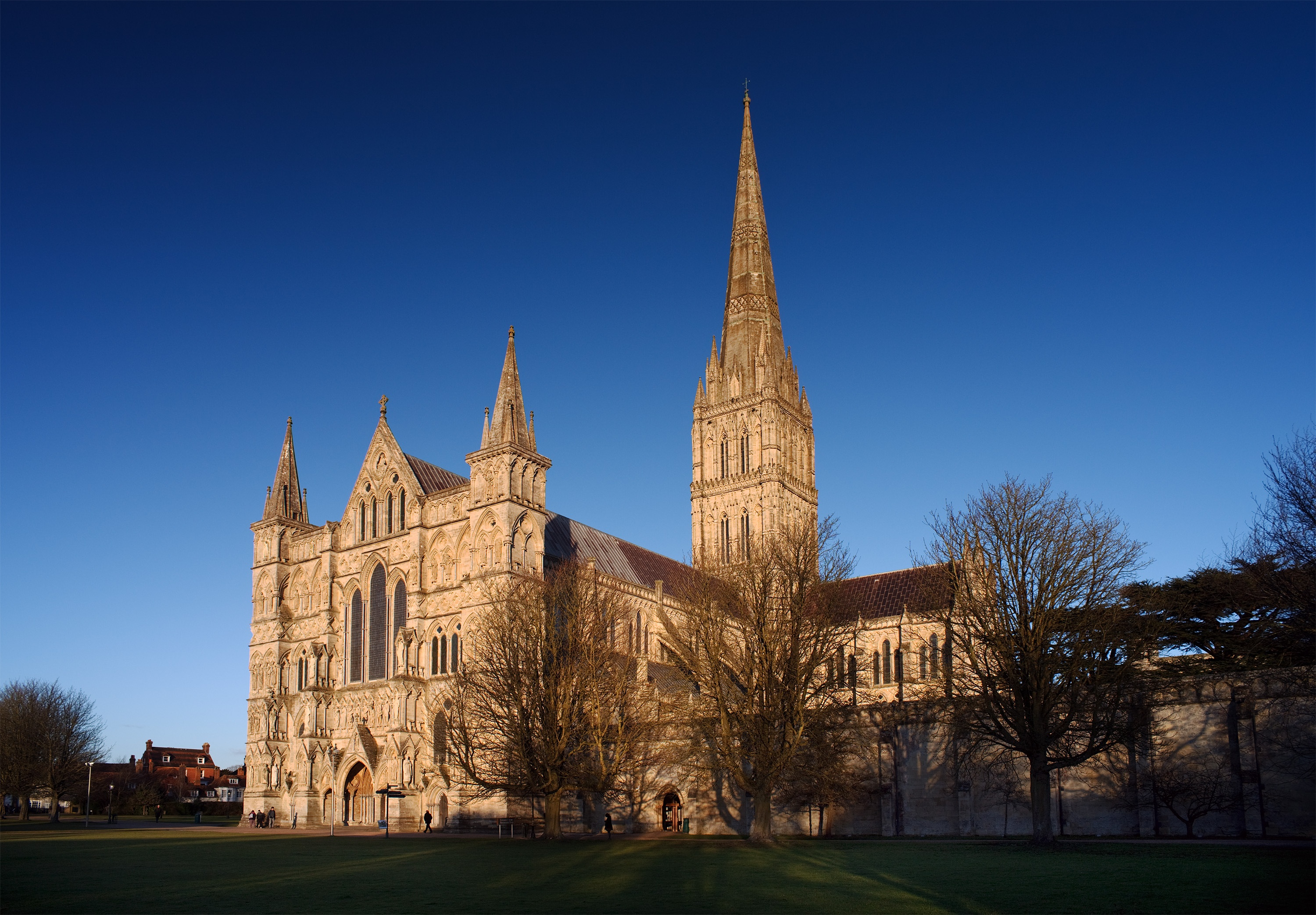
Salisbury

The Southern Cathedrals Festival is a five-day music festival held in rotation among the English cathedrals of Chichester, Winchester and Salisbury, in the penultimate week of July. The festival was restored in 1960 after initial attempts to create the annual occasion were followed by 28 years without it. The respective director of music acts as festival director when it is that cathedral's turn to host the event.

== History ==
In September 1904, a service was held in Chichester Cathedral to celebrate the reopening of the main organ of that cathedral following its restoration by Hele of Plymouth. This brought together the cathedral choirs of Chichester, Winchester and Salisbury. In 1905, the cathedral choirs met in Salisbury, followed by Winchester in 1906. Bishop Wilberforce of Chichester died in September 1907, so the return to Chichester had to be delayed until 1908, continuing until 1913 when the annual meeting was suspended because of the First World War. The festival was revived in 1920 and continued to be held until 1932. At that time the annual meeting consisted of a single day and the joint performance by the three choirs of a choral evensong.

In 1960, the festival was re-established by John Birch (Chichester), Reginald Alwyn Surplice (Winchester) and Christopher Dearnley (Salisbury), with the title changed to the Southern Cathedrals Festival, and the length increased to two days, with two joint evensong services and the addition of a concert.

The festival is now three days long, consisting of three concerts, a choral masterclass, an organ recital, a Festival Eucharist, buffet lunches, three evensong services sung separately by each choir and a "Fringe" event. The Fringe is an entertainment which is written and performed by the hosting cathedral. It consists of solos sung by lay clerks, comedy acts by organists and vicars, and so on.

== Commissioned works ==
- 1965 Bryan Kelly: Magnificat and Nunc Dimittis in C
- 1965 Leonard Bernstein: Chichester Psalms
- 1991 Patrick Gowers: Cantata
- 1996 Francis Jackson: I will extol Thee
- 1999 Francis Grier: A Prayer of St. Augustine
- 2004 Malcolm Archer: Benedicite
- 2005 Simon Lole: O Holy Ghost, O Paraclete
- 2008 Tarik O'Regan: Nunc Dimittis
- 2009 Will Todd: Psalm 146
- 2012 Neil Cox: The River of Life
- 2013 James MacMillan: The Offered Christ
- 2015 Howard Moody: In the hand of God
- 2016 Ned Bigham: Music to hear
- 2018 Marco Galvani: O Sacrum Convivium
- 2019 Frederick Stocken: Chichester Service (Evening Canticles)
- 2021 Joseph Twist: How shall we sing the Lord's song in a strange land?
- 2023 Christopher Hussey: The Star

== List of organ recitalists ==
An organ recital is given in the evening of the first day of the festival. Recitalists since 1986 have included:

- 1986 John Birch, former organist and master of the choristers, Chichester Cathedral
- 1987 James Lancelot, master of the choristers and organist, Durham Cathedral
- 1988 Colin Walsh, organist, Lincoln Cathedral
- 1989 Simon Lindley, organist, Leeds Parish Church
- 1990 Martin Neary, organist and master of the choristers, Westminster Abbey
- 1991 Nicolas Kynaston, concert organist
- 1992 Jeremy Suter, master of the music, Carlisle Cathedral
- 1993 Dr Marilyn Keiser, concert organist
- 1994 Thomas Trotter, Birmingham City Organist
- 1995 John Scott, director of music, St Paul's Cathedral
- 1996 Roy Massey, organist and director of music, Hereford Cathedral
- 1997 David Briggs, director of music, Gloucester Cathedral
- 1998 James Thomas, director of music, St Edmundsbury Cathedral
- 2001 Adrian Lucas, master of the choristers, Worcester Cathedral
- 2002 Stephen Farr, organist and master of the choristers, Guildford Cathedral
- 2003 James O’Donnell, organist and master of the choristers, Westminster Abbey
- 2004 Martin Baker, master of music, Westminster Cathedral
- 2005 Philip Scriven, organist and master of the choristers, Lichfield Cathedral
- 2006 David Briggs, organist emeritus, Gloucester Cathedral
- 2007 Colin Walsh, organist laureate, Lincoln Cathedral
- 2008 John Scott, organist and director of music, Saint Thomas Church Fifth Avenue
- 2009 James Lancelot, master of the choristers and organist, Durham Cathedral
- 2010 Thomas Trotter, Birmingham City organist
- 2011 James O’Donnell, organist and master of the choristers, Westminster Abbey
- 2012 Gillian Weir, concert organist
- 2013 Mark Wardell, former assistant organist, Chichester Cathedral
- 2014 Robert Quinney, director of music, Peterborough Cathedral
- 2015 Naji Hakim, former Organiste Titulaire, Église de la Sainte-Trinité, Paris
- 2016 David Goode, organist, Eton College and former sub-organist, Christ Church, Oxford
- 2017 Simon Johnson, organist and assistant director of music, St Paul's Cathedral
- 2018 Daniel Cook, master of the choristers and organist, Durham Cathedral
- 2019 Franz Hauk, organist, Liebfrauenmünster, Ingolstadt
- 2023 Colin Walsh, organist laureate, Lincoln Cathedral
- 2024 Jonathan Hope, assistant director of music, Gloucester Cathedral

== See also ==
- List of music festivals in the United Kingdom
- Choir of Chichester Cathedral
- Winchester Cathedral Choir
- Salisbury Cathedral Choir
