= Herald AV Publications =

British record label

Herald AV Publications was a British record label.

Founded in 1984, Herald AV Publications was set up as a specialist Catholic recording company. It served both to promote established professional artists and to provide an outlet for new artists. Beginning with recordings of monastic chant, it had over one hundred titles in its catalogue, ranging from 10th century chant to 20th century organ music; from spirituals to traditional anthems; from youth and school choirs to music for centres of pilgrimage; from hymns with full brass accompaniment to Christmas carols.

== Musicians and choirs ==
- Ralph Allwood
- Sarah Baldock
- Stephen Farr
- David Goode
- Naji Hakim
- Michael Howard

== Recording locations ==
- Brentwood Cathedral
- Chichester Cathedral
- Douai Abbey
- Ely Cathedral
- Eton College Chapel, Eton
- Farnborough Abbey
- London Oratory
- Notre Dame de Paris
- Quarr Abbey
- Reims Cathedral
- Rochester Cathedral
- Southwark Cathedral
- St George's Chapel, Windsor
- Vatican City
- Westminster Cathedral
- Winchester Cathedral
- Worth Abbey

== See also ==
- Mary Berry
- Early music
- Gregorian Chant
- Chichester Psalms
- List of Roman Catholic Church musicians
- Lists of record labels
