= Cathedral Music Trust =

British charity supporting choral music in cathedrals and churches

The Cathedral Music Trust, formerly the Friends of Cathedral Music (FCM), is a charity which seeks to maintain and expand the work of choral foundations of cathedrals, collegiate churches, chapels, and other appropriate places of worship in the United Kingdom and Ireland. To this end, it makes grants and distributes a number of publications.

== History ==
The Friends of Cathedral Music was founded in 1956 by the Revd. Ronald Sibthorp at a meeting at St Bride's Church Fleet Street. It was prompted by a decision of the Provost of Southwell at Southwell Minster to abolish the Saturday choral evensong so that the lay clerks could watch the weekly football at Newark-on-Trent. There was also a similar incident at Truro Cathedral.

Sibthorp, in an effort to reverse the decline in interest in cathedral music after World War II, sought to create a promoting organisation the Cathedral Music Advisory Committee. However the committee failed to get off the ground, so he tried a new tack and sent a letter on 2 June 1956 that jump-started a new cathedral music organisation, The Friends of Cathedral Music.

Friends of Cathedral Music became the Cathedral Music Trust, a charitable incorporated organisation, in 2020. HRH The Duchess of Gloucester became Royal Patron of the Trust in 2021.

== Aims ==
The Friends of Cathedral Music makes grants to choirs as endowments in support of chorister scholarships, or the purchase of capital equipment such as rehearsal pianos. The aims as spelt out in 1958 were to:

1. Widening public interest in cathedral services
2. Supporting and encouraging cathedral chapters
3. Restoring the pre-war levels of cathedral services
4. Expanding to churches where there is no choir.

== Publications ==
The Friends of Cathedral Music publishes:

- Cathedral Music – a twice-yearly magazine covering a wide range of subjects relevant to the objectives of the charity.
- Singing in Cathedrals – a directory of choral services in choral foundations in Great Britain and Ireland.
- Cathedral Voice – a twice-yearly newsletter.

== List of presidents ==
- Martin Shaw 1956–1958
- Herbert Howells 1958–1983
- George Guest 1983–2002
- Christopher Robinson 2004–
- Harry Christophers

== List of chairmen ==
- Ronald Sibthorpe 1956–1971
- Christopher Hugh Dearnley 1971–1990
- Alan Thurlow 1990–2002
- Professor Peter Toyne 2002–
- Jonathan McDonald 2020-
