= Mark Wardell =

Mark Wardell was assistant organist at Chichester Cathedral from 1997 to 2009, serving for five of those years as Director of Music at the Prebendal School, the Cathedral Choir's School. He had previously held positions at Royal Holloway College, University of London, St. George's Chapel, Windsor Castle, and Christ's Hospital School, Horsham.

His work in Chichester involved him in numerous live BBC broadcasts and recordings, the Southern Cathedrals Festival and Chichester Festivities. The Cathedral Choir at Chichester is one of the widely respected in the country and it is the primary role of the Assistant Organist to accompany the choir in its opus dei – the singing of the daily choral liturgies.

Mark has featured as soloist and accompanist on numerous commercial recordings released through IMP Classics, Carlton, Pickwick, Lammas, Guild and Priory. He enjoys life as a recitalist and has a formidable reputation as one of the foremost British exponents of liturgical improvisation. He has performed throughout Europe, South America and South Africa and has given recitals in most of the major venues in England, including a début performance in St. John's Smith Square and Westminster Abbey.

Chichester's links to Bamberg and Chartres have enabled him to give recitals in both of those cathedrals; his programme in Chartres (in 2004) concluded with a 20-minute improvisation on the plainsong: Salve Regina.

He is co-founder of the university based Chichester Chorale where he is also Organ Performance Tutor. Mark is a Fellow of the Royal College of Organists.

On Christmas Day 2009, Wardell left the Choral Foundation at Chichester Cathedral to take up the post of Director of Music at Barrow Hills School in Surrey.

Cultural offices
Preceded by James Thomas	Assistant Organist of Chichester Cathedral; 1997–2009	Succeeded by Timothy Ravalde
