= Katherine Dienes =

New Zealand musician (born 1970)

Katherine Dienes also known as Katherine Dienes-Williams (born in Wellington, 10 January 1970) is a New Zealand-born organist, conductor and composer currently serving as Director of Music at Winchester Cathedral, having previously been Organist and Master of the Choristers at Guildford Cathedral from 2008 to 2026.

== Early career and education ==
Dienes was born and educated in Wellington, New Zealand, and studied for a BA in Modern Languages and a BMus at Victoria University, Wellington. She was organ scholar at Saint Paul's Cathedral, Wellington from 1988 to 1991 when she was appointed Assistant Organist there. She also acted as Assistant Conductor of the Wellington Youth Choir and appeared as a soloist with Wellington Youth Orchestra.

Dienes came to England in 1991 to take up the post of organ scholar at Winchester Cathedral and Assistant Organist at Winchester College.

== Appointments ==
=== Collegiate Church of St Mary, Warwick ===
Dienes was appointed Director of Music St Mary's, Warwick, in 2001 where she directed and trained the choir of gentlemen and boys, the girls' choir, and Collegium, an adult concert choir based at the church. With the choirs of St Mary's she made a recording of Advent and Christmas music, A Spotless Rose, on Regent Records (REG CD 236).

=== Guildford Cathedral ===
In September 2007, Dienes was appointed Organist and Master of the Choristers at Guildford Cathedral. She assumed the post in January 2008, taking over from Stephen Farr and becoming the first woman to hold the senior music post at a Church of England cathedral.

=== Winchester Cathedral ===
In 2026 Dienes was appointed Director of Music at Winchester Cathedral.

== Compositions ==
Dienes has composed a number of sacred works, mainly for upper voices, as well as some secular compositions. She was commissioned to write a Mass setting commissioned by Norwich Cathedral.

Treble Clef Music Press published her music as follows:

- Adam Lay I-bounden
- Ave Maria
- Ave Verum
- Father Julius Canticles (Magnificat, Nunc Dimittis)
- Magnificat "Regina coeli" with antiphon for Easter season
- Silent Night (setting for choir and organ)

== Discography ==
- A Spotless Rose, Advent to Epiphany at St Mary's, Warwick, with the choirs of St Mary's, Warwick, for Regent Records, REGCD236

== Critical reception ==
The Washington Post, reviewing Songs for Hannah, noted "Joy and glee, of course, can be subjective. The Hannah texts are pretty severe: There's a lot of 'the wicked shall be put to silence in darkness' and 'they that strive with the Lord shall be broken in pieces.' But [Dienes-Williams's] music was luminous, with insistent rhythms and an almost ancient, incantatory feel."

John W. Lambert, reviewing the Guildford Cathedral Choir's visit to Raleigh, NC during its US East Coast tour, observed that Dienes-Williams "has a huge and altogether favorable reputation among church musicians." He went on to say that the reputation was "richly deserved"; she was a "highly animated director, and she elicited some of the most remarkable 'church choir' singing heard hereabouts in a long time." A Haydn motet "left many members of the audience awe-struck."

== Personal life ==
Her husband is Patrick Williams, librarian of the Royal Philharmonic Orchestra, and they have a daughter, Hannah, who sang as a chorister at Guildford Cathedral .

Preceded by Chris Betts	Director of Music, Collegiate Church of St Mary, Warwick; 2001–2007	Succeeded by Thomas Corns
Preceded by Stephen Farr	Organist and Master of the Choristers, Guildford Cathedral; 2008–2026	Succeeded by vacant
Preceded by Andrew Lumsden	Director of Music, Winchester Cathedral; 2026–	Succeeded by
