= Michael Howard (musician) =

- Born: Michael Stockwin Howard; 14 September 1922; Paddington, London, England, UK
- Died: 4 January 2002 (aged 79) Groombridge, East Sussex, England, UK
- Occupations: Choral conductor, organist and composer
- Instrument: Organ

Michael Stockwin Howard (14 September 1922 – 4 January 2002) was an English choral conductor, organist and composer. He was an important part of the Early Music movement in the middle of the last century, in particular as a celebrated interpreter of 16th century polyphony In his later years he made notable recordings of the late French Romantic school of organ composers, particularly César Franck, on the Cavaillé Coll organ at St. Michael's Abbey in Farnborough. The National Pipe Organ Register now claims that the organ appears in a list of organs by Mutin (originally attributed to Aristide Cavaille-Coll).

Educated at Ellesmere College, Shropshire, Michael went on to study Organ (with G.D. Cunningham) and Composition (with William Alwyn) at the Royal Academy of Music in London. His organ studies continued with Ralph Downes at the Brompton Oratory, London, and Marcel Dupré at St Sulpice in Paris.

In 1944 he founded The Renaissance Singers with whom he gave numerous concerts and made many recordings and broadcasts for the next twenty years. He was organist of Tewkesbury Abbey (1943–1944), Christ Church, Woburn Square in London (1945–1950), Ely Cathedral (1953–1958), St. Marylebone Parish Church in London (1971–1979) and at St. Michael's Abbey in Farnborough (1984–1986). In the 1960s he formed and conducted the sixteen-voice group Cantores in Ecclesia.

Cultural offices
Preceded by Sidney Campbell	Organist and Master of the Choristers of Ely Cathedral; 1953–1958	Succeeded by Arthur Wills
