= James Thomas (English musician) =

English organist and choirmaster

James Thomas MA FRCO (born 1963) is an English organist and choirmaster. He has held several liturgical posts at cathedrals, including Blackburn, Chichester and St Edmundsbury Cathedral.

== Early life and education ==
Thomas was born in Banbury, England. He was educated at Magdalen College School, Brackley, before going on to read music at Gonville and Caius College, Cambridge where he was organ scholar. Upon graduating, he spent a year studying for the Postgraduate Certificate in Education. He gained the FRCO diploma in 1985 and was awarded the prize for extemporisation. He spent two years at the Rouen Conservatoire, taught by Louis Thiry, and was awarded a Premier Prix in organ performance in 1988. He was twice a finalist for the Tournemire Prize at the St Albans International Organ Festival in both 1987 and 1988.

== Career ==
Upon returning to England in 1988, Thomas was appointed Assistant Organist of Blackburn Cathedral, a position he held for three years before moving to Chichester Cathedral as Assistant Organist, in 1991. Whilst at Chichester Cathedral, Thomas was also Director of Music of The Prebendal School, the choir school. In September 1997, he left Chichester to become Director of Music at St Edmundsbury Cathedral, a position he held until 2020. During his tenure, the choir made several CDs and broadcasts on the BBC. In 1998, he was appointed conductor of the Cambridgeshire Choral Society, a post he held until 2004. Thomas has given recitals up and down the country, as well as in France and Germany. In 1995, he was a semi-finalist in the Royal College of Organists "Performer of the Year" competition.

== Discography ==
- 2009 – The Holy Temple (Regent)
- 2004 – So Rich a Crown (Lammas)
- 2001 – Godspeed (Lammas)
- 2001 – Complete New English Hymnal Vol. 12 (Priory)
- 1999 – Advent to Candlemass (Lammas)
- 1997 – Sing Ye to the Lord (Lammas)
- 1996 – Chichester Commissions (Priory)
- 1996 – Great Cathedral Anthems Vol. 7 (Priory)
- 199? – Organ Masterworks (Kevin Mayhew)
- 1994 – Malcolm Archer: Requiem (Kevin Mayhew)
- 1991 – Magnificat and Nunc Dimittis Vol. 2 (Priory)

== Works ==
- We wait for thy loving kindness
- St Edmund Prayer
- The Prayer of St Richard
- Benedicite in E flat-Recently Edited 2012

== External sources ==
- Director of Music – profile on St Edmundsbury Cathedral website

Cultural offices
Preceded by Mervyn Cousins	Organist and Master of the Choristers of St Edmundsbury Cathedral; 1997–2020	Succeeded by Timothy Parsons
