= Andrew Lumsden (choral director) =

British organist and musician

Dr Andrew Lumsden (born 10 November 1962) is a British organist and musician. He was organist and director of music at Winchester Cathedral from 2002 until 2024.

The son of musician and choirmaster David Lumsden, he trained at Winchester College, RSAMD and St John's College, Cambridge, before taking up the position of assistant organist at Southwark Cathedral in 1985. From there he moved to Westminster Abbey in 1988 as Sub-Organist and then to Lichfield Cathedral in 1992 as Organist and Master of the Choristers until moving to Winchester in 2002. He is currently the director of the Waynflete Singers. He was awarded an Honorary Doctorate of Music from the University of Winchester in November 2023. He was also appointed Fellow of the Royal School of Church Music (FRSCM) in 2021.

Lumsden announced that he had decided to stand down as Director of Music at Winchester Cathedral on 31 July 2024. Andrew Lucas has been appointed as Interim Music Director until July 2026.

Cultural offices
Preceded by Jonathan Rees-Williams	Organist and Master of the Choristers of Lichfield Cathedral; 1992–2002	Succeeded by Philip Scriven
Preceded by David Hill	Organist and Master of the Choristers of Winchester Cathedral; 2002–2024	Succeeded by
