= Timothy Ravalde =

English organist

Timothy Ravalde (born 1988) is an English organist and the current Assistant Organist of Chichester Cathedral.

== Early life and education ==
Ravalde was educated at the Nelson Thomlinson School in Wigton. He was Organ Scholar of Carlisle Cathedral and became a Fellow of the Royal College of Organists whilst he was in the sixth form. In 2006 he took up the Organ Scholarship at Salisbury Cathedral.

He graduated from Cambridge University in 2010. As Organ Scholar of St John's College he oversaw three CD recordings as well as the daily chapel services and frequent tours.

== Career ==
Ravalde was appointed Assistant Organist of Chichester Cathedral, succeeding Mark Wardell. He currently teaches piano and organ at The Prebendal School.

Cultural offices
Preceded by Mark Wardell	Assistant Organist of Chichester Cathedral; 2010–	Succeeded by Incumbent
