= Organist and master of the choristers =

Church of England title

Organist and master of the choristers is the title given to a director of music at a cathedral, particularly a Church of England cathedral. The tradition dates back to the Middle Ages. They are often both the organist and the choirmaster.

The organist and master of the choristers is usually responsible for planning and producing all musical aspects of the cathedral work. That includes training and conducting of the cathedral choir. The sub-organist or assistant organist usually plays at cathedral services, although they will also be expected to take over the choral duties if the organist is unavailable.

One of the longest serving organists and masters of the choristers was Andrew Goodwin, who retired from Bangor Cathedral on 31 October 2009. He had served there for 37 years. He was the master of the choristers when Aled Jones was in the choir. Other long-serving holders of the title include Charles J Brennan, who spent 60 years (1904–1964) at Belfast Cathedral and Dr Leslie Paul of Bangor Cathedral who served in that role for 42 years (1928 - 1970).

== See also ==
- List of musicians at English cathedrals
