= Organ and organists of Chester Cathedral =

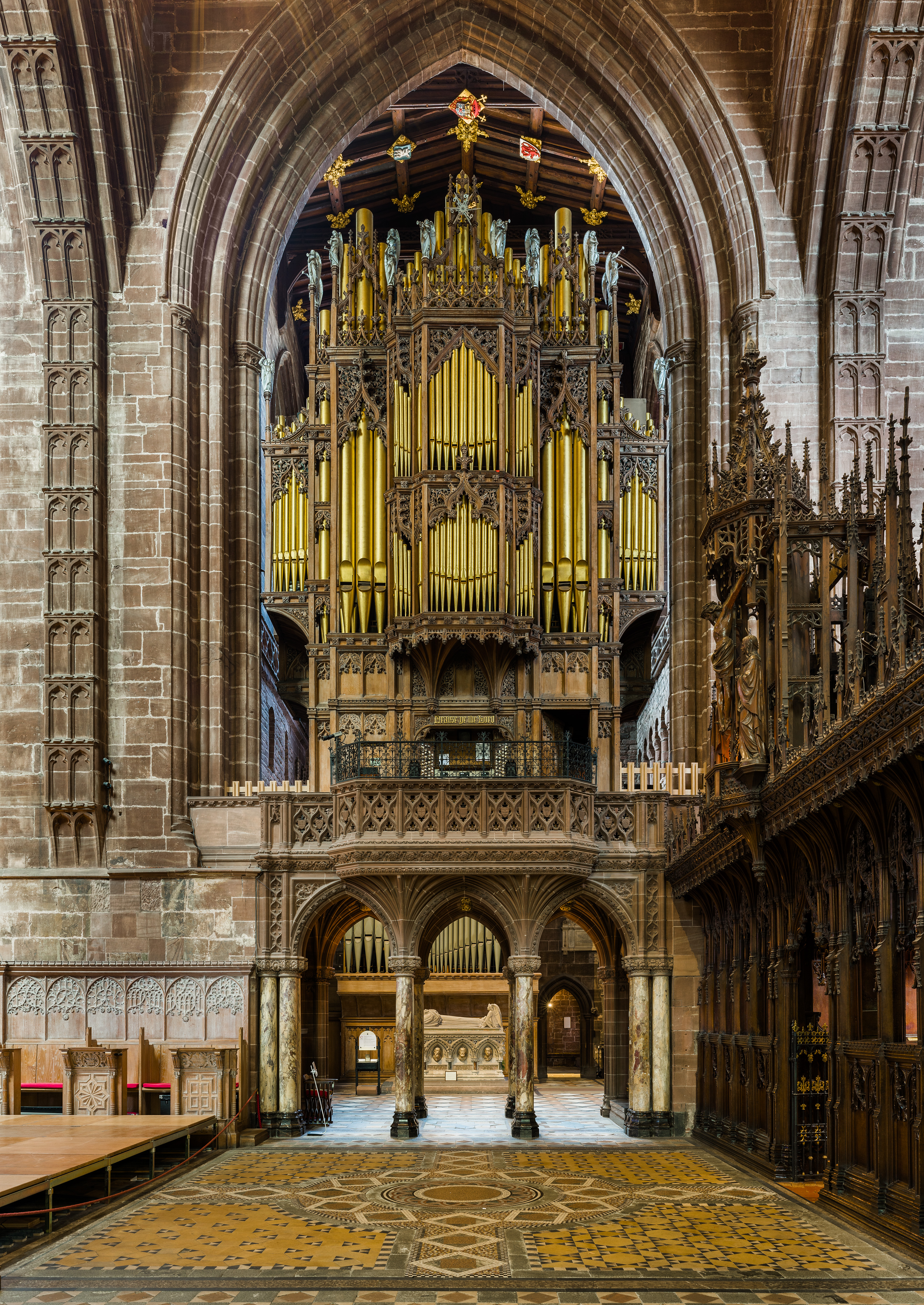
The façade of the grand organ in 2014

The Cathedral Church of Christ and the Blessed Virgin Mary in Chester, Cheshire, England houses two pipe organs which are played by its organists. Of these, the grand organ, built by Gray and Davison in 1844, is its major source of instrumental music. Primarily positioned in the north crossing but spread throughout three areas in the building, it is played for daily services and often engaged in choral accompaniment, as well as being used for concerts and recitals. The latter of these instruments is a portable positive organ of four ranks constructed by Robert Jennings in 2019, which is usually stationed around the cathedral's quire.

Chester Cathedral's organists have included composers Robert White and Malcolm Boyle. Their present Organist and Director of Music is Philip Rushforth and their Assistant Organist is Alex Palotai; the post of Assistant Director of Music and Sub Organist is presently held by Daniel Matheson.

The cathedral is renowned for holding one of the oldest choral traditions (of over nine-hundred years) in the United Kingdom, dating from the foundation of the Benedictine monastery.

Lunchtime recitals on the grand organ are held every Thursday, with their monthly music programme being available on the cathedral's website.

== Grand Organ ==
=== History ===
In 1844, an organ by Gray and Davison of London was installed in the south aisle of the quire, replacing an instrument with parts dating back to 1626, possibly by Father Bernard Smith. Its organ case was built and designed by George Gilbert Scott.

Following the counsel of George Ashdown Audsley, cathedral dean John Howson and its chapter approved plans for renovation of the instrument. From then the organ was rebuilt and enlarged by Charles Whiteley and Brothers (a firm from Chester) in 1876, assembling an instrument containing, among others harmonic flutes and reeds by Aristide Cavaillé-Coll. Most of it was later moved to its present position at the front of the north crossing, with the Pedal being relocated to the northern transept; however, the Choir division remained in the aisle of the south quire.

In 1910 William Hill and Son of London extensively rebuilt and revoiced the organ, completely replacing all of its reeds (including Cavaillé-Coll's) with new ranks of their own, as well as replacing its soundboards. The Choir division of the organ was enlarged and moved behind the choir-stalls on the south side.

Following complaints in 1967 from organists and the liturgical community of 'unreliability' and being unsuited to the building's musical and acoustical requirements, plans were conveyed for a complete overhaul of the instrument. Of the four major firms that were considered and consulted for the project, the Liverpudlian Rushworth and Dreaper company, who had maintained the instrument for many years past, were chosen for the contract. A new mechanism and some new pipework made to a design by the organist, Roger Fisher, were installed. The instrument was inaugurated by Maurice Duruflé and his wife Marie-Madeleine Duruflé the following year.

Since 1991, the organ has been in the care of David Wells Organ Builders Ltd of Liverpool.

=== Specification ===
The organ's four manual keyboards run through sixty-one keys of five-octaves (C-c'''') and its radiating concave pedalboard runs through thirty-two keys of two-and-a-half-octaves (C-g'). Though Gray and Davison originally provided the organ with tracker action, the instrument's key and drawstop mechanisms presently employ electro-pneumatic action, which were added by Hill and Son. Its bellows are pumped electrically, which is triggered by a key at the console, thus powering the instrument. Until a point in the late nineteenth century, the bellows were pumped manually. The console labels and keys are veneered in ivory (with the accidentals in ebony); on the other hand, the pedalboard is unadorned except for its accidentals being painted in black. It has 109 pistons including fourteen generals on thirty-two memory channels.

It is tuned to a' = 440 Hz in equal temperament. In total, the instrument carries sixty-nine stops amounting to eighty-six ranks of pipes.

The disposition of the organ's stops is as follows:

==== i. Choir ====
- Double Dulciana 16'
- Viola 8'
- Stopped Diapason 8'
- Open Diapason 8'
- Dulciana 8'
- Stopped Flute 4'
- Principal 4'
- Gemshorn 4'
- Piccolo 2'
- Fifteenth 2'
- Mixture III (22.25.29)
- Schalmei 8'

==== ii. Great ====
- Double Diapason 16' — pipework polished in brass, partially displayed in façade
- Open Flute 8'
- First Open Diapason 8' — pipework polished in brass; partially displayed in façade
- Second Open Diapason 8'
- Third Open Diapason 8'
- Flûte à pavillon 8'
- Hohlflöte 8'
- Principal 4'
- Octave 4'
- Harmonic Flute 4'
- Spitzflöte 2'
- Fifteenth 2'
- Tierce 1 3/5'
- Mixture V (15.19.22.26.29)
- Sharp Mixture III (29.33.36)
- Contra Posaune 16'
- Trumpet 8'
- Clarion 4'

==== iii. Swell ====
This division is expressive; it is enclosed in a swell box.

- Vox Angelica 8' — from Tenor c
- Stopped Diapason 8'
- Salicional 8'
- Open Diapason 8'
- Suabe Flute 4'
- Principal 4'
- Fifteenth 2'
- Mixture IV (19.22.26.29)
- Sharp Mixture IV (26.29.33.36)
- Double Trumpet 16'
- Bassoon 16'
- Oboe 8'
- Horn 8'
- Clarion 4'
- Tremulant

==== iv. Solo ====
This division is partially expressive, with its affected stops enclosed in a swell box. The Bourdon, Koppelflöte, Nazard, Tierce and Cymbel are unenclosed in order to form a cornet or sesquialtera should the organist draw them in unison; as is the Tuba, which is customarily inexpressible.

- Viola 8'
- Céleste 8' — from Tenor c
- Bourdon 8'
- Koppelflöte 4'
- Nazard 2 2/3'
- Tierce 1 3/5'
- Cymbel III (29.33.36)
- Vox humana 8'
- Tuba 8'
- Clarinet 8'
- Tremulant
- Zimbelstern

==== Pedal ====
The Double Open Wood and the three reed stops of this division are located in their own case in cathedral's north transept.

- Double Open Wood 32'
- Violone 16'
- Open Wood 16'
- Open Diapason 16' — cast in lead
- Dulciana 16' — transmission of the Choir Double Dulciana 16'
- Bourdon 16'
- Violoncello 8'
- Principal 8' — cast in lead
- Bass Flute 8'
- Fifteenth 4'
- Mixture IV (19.22.26.29)
- Contra Trombone 32'
- Trombone 16'
- Trumpet 8'

==== Couplers ====
- Swell to Pedal
- Swell to Great
- Swell to Choir
- Swell Octave
- Choir to Great
- Choir to Pedal
- Great to Pedal
- Solo to Pedal
- Solo Sub-Octave
- Solo Octave
- Solo Unison Off
- Great to Choir
- Solo to Choir
- Solo to Great

== Portable chamber organ ==
This tracker instrument was built in 2019 by Robin Jennings following a commission from the cathedral. A positive organ, it has the purpose of accompanying choral and chamber (especially Renaissance and Baroque) music. It was made from French oak with boxwood naturals and ebony accidentals, and can easily be transported around the building.

=== Specification ===
- Stopped Flute 8'
- Stopped Flute 4'
- Gemshorn 4'
- Fifteenth 2' — cast from tin

== Organists ==
- 1541 John Brycheley
- 1551 Thomas Barnes
- 1558 Richard Saywell
- 1567 Robert White
- 1570 Robert Stevenson
- 1599 Thomas Bateson
- 1609 John Alien
- 1613 Michael Done
- 1614 Thomas Jones
- 1637 Richard Newbold
- 1642 Randolph Jewitt
- 1661 Rev. Peter Stringer
- 1673 John Stringer
- 1686 William Key
- 1699 John Mounterratt
- 1705 Edmund White
- 1715 Samuel Davies
- 1726 Benjamin Worrall
- 1727 Edmund Baker
- 1765 Edward Orme
- 1776 John Bailey
- 1803 Edward Bailey
- 1823 George Black
- 1824 Thomas Haylett
- 1841 Frederick Gunton
- 1877 Joseph Cox Bridge
- 1925 John Thomas Hughes
- 1930 Charles Hylton Stewart
- 1932 Malcolm Courtenay Boyle
- 1949 James Roland Middleton
- 1964 John Sanders
- 1967 Roger Fisher
- 1997 David Poulter
- 2008 Philip Rushforth

=== Assistant organists ===
- Mr Munns 1857
- Herbert Stephen Irons 1872 - 1876
- Joseph Cox Bridge 1876 - 1877 (then organist)
- John Gumi ???? - 1890
- John Thomas Hughes 1893 - 1925 (then organist)
- Guillaume Ormond 1925 - 1926 (later organist of Truro Cathedral)
- James Roland Middleton 1934 - 1944 (later organist of Chelmsford Cathedral)
- George Guest 1944 - 1947
- Brian Runnett 1955 - 1960
- Peter Gilbert White 1960 - 1962 (later director of music of Leicester Cathedral)
- Harold Hullah 1962 - 1967
- John Belcher 1967 - 1971
- John Cooper Green 1971 - 1975
- John Keys 1975 - 1978
- Simon Russell 1978 - 1986
- Lee Ward 1986 - 1989
- Graham Eccles 1989 - 1998
- Philip Stopford 2000 - 2003
- Ian Roberts 2003 - 2011
- Benjamin Chewter 2011 - 2016
- Andrew Wyatt 2016 - 2020
- Daniel Matheson 2023–present
