= Philip Rushforth =

English classical composer

- Born: 1972 (age 53–54); Chester
- Occupation: Organist

Philip Rushforth (born 1972) is an arranger and classical composer who has served as the Organist and Master of the Choristers at Chester Cathedral since 2009. He has collaborated with David Hill and Stephen Layton.

== Biography ==
Rushforth was a cathedral chorister at Chester Cathedral. He was tutored by Roger Fisher. In 1991, he was appointed as an organ scholar at Trinity College, Cambridge, and was directed by Dr Richard Marlow. Rushforth was also taught by David Sanger.

== Career ==
=== Southwell ===
In 1994, he took up the post of Assistant Organist at Southwell Minster and co-founded the Southwell Minster Chorale. He worked with the chorale for eight years.

=== Chester ===
In September 2002 he was appointed assistant director of music at Chester Cathedral. Between December 2007 and January 2008, Rushforth was appointed director of music and organist. In 2015, he appeared on BBC Radio 2 on The Organist Entertains: Battle of the Organs. In 2018, he conducted Fauré's Requiem alongside John Lubbock. In 2024, he conducted the choir and a group of musicians from the North West at the wedding of Hugh Grosvenor, 7th Duke of Westminster and Olivia Henson.

== Works ==
- Sleep, my Jesus, sleep – traditional Ukrainian Christmas carol, arranged by Philip Rushforth (Encore Publications 020798, 2024)

== Discography ==
- Chester Cathedral Choir Sings Music By Rheinberger And Elgar (Alpha, 1988)
- Southwell Splendour (OxRecs Digital, 1998)
- Come, Come My Voice (Lammas, 2002)
- French Organ Music from Chester Cathedral (Amphion, 2007)
- Miserere – Choral Favourites (Sony, 2009)
- Whitlock and Hylton Stewart – The Organ of Chester Cathedral (Priory, 2011)
- The Great British Wedding Album (Sony, 2011)
- The Grand Organ of Chester Cathedral (Priory, 2012)
- Glory To The New-Born King (Priory, 2012)
- J S Bach from Chester (Priory, 2018)
- Choral Classics from Chester – The Choir of Chester Cathedral (Priory, 2018)
- Richard Lambert: Music for Brass and Organ (Toccata, 2024)

== Awards and achievements ==
In September 2000, he was a finalist in the Royal College of Organists' Performer of the Year award, performing with the BBC Philharmonic Orchestra and Rumon Gamba. In 2020 he was awarded an honorary Associateship of the Royal School of Church Music (ARSCM) for "achievements in church music of national significance". These include several years volunteering for the former RCSM Chester Area Committee, and for volunteering for Region One in the north of England.

== See also ==
- Organ and organists of Chester Cathedral
- List of musicians at English cathedrals#Chester Cathedral
