= Hubicki =

Hubicki is a surname. Notable people with the surname include:

- Alfred Ritter von Hubicki (1887–1971), Austro-Hungarian general
- Christian Hubicki, Survivor reality show participant
- Peggy Hubicki (1915–2006), English composer and music teacher
