= Organ scholar =

Subclass of an organist

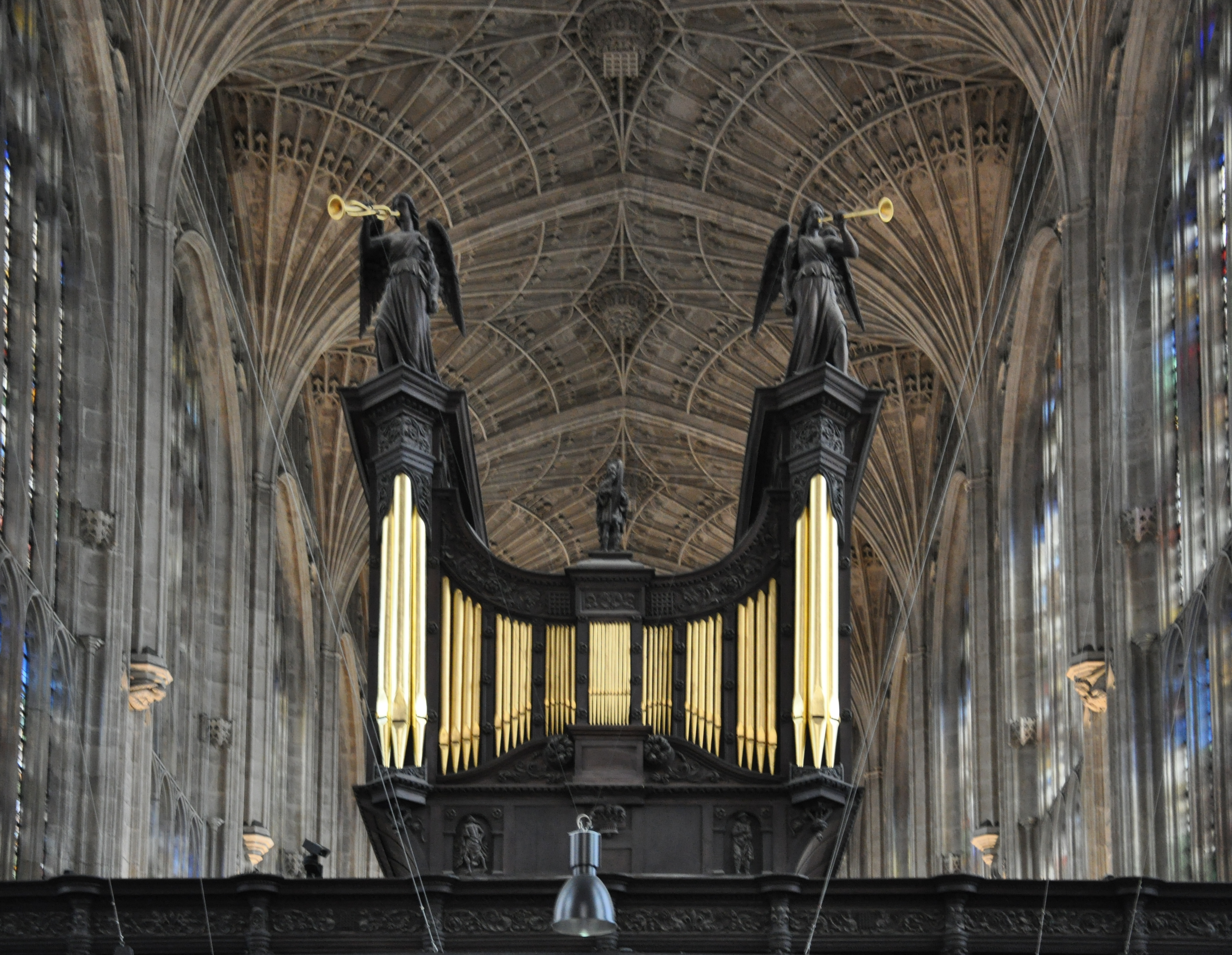
Organ scholars often gain experience on a cathedral or collegiate chapel organ, such as this one at King's College Chapel, Cambridge

An organ scholar is a young musician employed as a part-time assistant organist at a cathedral, church or institution where regular choral services are held. The idea of an organ scholarship is to provide the holder with playing, directing and administrative experience. It is an important part of music-making in Christian worship and is strongly associated with, but is not limited to, Anglican church music in the United Kingdom, Australia and the USA.

Organ scholars may sometimes be found at a cathedral or a collegiate church. Many colleges at the universities of Oxford, Cambridge, Durham and Trinity College Dublin, as well as other universities, offer organ scholarships to undergraduates. At some institutions (for example, Christ Church, Oxford, New College, Oxford, Trinity College Dublin or King's College, Cambridge), the organ scholar(s) work under the direction of a full-time professional director of music. At other institutions, the organ scholar is in charge of running the choir.

One of the first organ scholarships in the University of Cambridge was set up by Queens' College, Cambridge. An early scholar there was the composer Charles Villiers Stanford, who took up his position there in 1870.

Many organ scholars have gone on to notable careers in music and in other fields. Two notable ex-organ scholars who went on to achieve fame in other fields are Edward Heath, who read Philosophy, Politics, and Economics at Balliol College, Oxford, and later served as British Prime Minister 1970–1974; and Dudley Moore, who read music at Magdalen College, Oxford, and went on to a career in acting.

== Notable organ scholars at universities and colleges ==
Name	Institution	Dates	Later appointments	Ref
Hugh Percy Allen	Christ's College, Cambridge	1892–1895	Organist of St Asaph Cathedral, Ely Cathedral and New College, Oxford; professor of music at the University of Oxford and director of the Royal College of Music	
James Anderson-Besant	St John's College, Cambridge	2016−2020	Organist of Truro Cathedral, 2023−present	
Malcolm Archer	Jesus College, Cambridge	1972–1975	Organist of Bristol Cathedral, Wells Cathedral and St Paul's Cathedral; director of chapel music and organist of Winchester College	
Richard Armstrong	Corpus Christi College, Cambridge	1961	Music Director of Welsh National Opera and Scottish Opera	
Thomas Armstrong	Keble College, Oxford	1919–1921	Organist of Christ Church Cathedral, Oxford	
Martin Baker	Downing College, Cambridge	1985–1988	Master of Music at Westminster Cathedral	
Sarah Baldock	Pembroke College, Cambridge	1993–1996	Assistant Director of Music Winchester Cathedral, organist of Chichester Cathedral, director of music at Winchester College	
Ayo Bankole	Clare College, Cambridge	1961–1964	Organist of Lagos Cathedral	
Stephen Barlow	Trinity College, Cambridge	1972–1975		
Benjamin Bayl	King's College, Cambridge	1997–2000		
Kenneth Beard	Emmanuel College, Cambridge	1949–1952	Organist of Southwell Minster	
John Bertalot	Corpus Christi College, Cambridge and Lincoln College, Oxford	1955–1958 (Corpus Christi) ? (Lincoln)	Organist of Blackburn Cathedral	
Harry Bicket	Christ Church, Oxford	1980–1983	Director of The English Concert	
Jonathan Bielby	St John's College, Cambridge	1963–1967	Organist of Wakefield Cathedral	
Hugh Blair	Christ's College, Cambridge	1883–1886	Organist of Worcester Cathedral	
Mark Blatchly	Christ Church, Oxford	1978–1981	Organist of St Edmundsbury Cathedral	
Geraint Bowen	Jesus College, Cambridge	1982–1985	Organist of St Davids Cathedral and Hereford Cathedral	
John Dykes Bower	Corpus Christi College, Cambridge	1922	Organist of Truro Cathedral and St Paul's Cathedral	
Harry Bramma	Pembroke College, Oxford	1955–1960	Organist of Southwark Cathedral and director of the Royal School of Church Music	
Herbert Brewer	Exeter College, Oxford	1883–1885	Composer, organist of Bristol Cathedral and Gloucester Cathedral	
David Briggs	King's College, Cambridge	1981–1984	Organist of Truro Cathedral and Gloucester Cathedral	
Paul Brough	Magdalen College, Oxford	1983–1986	Organist of Sheffield Cathedral, director of music at All Saints, Margaret Street.	
William Denis Browne	Clare College, Cambridge	1910–1912	Composer and music critic	
John Butt	King's College, Cambridge	1979–1982	Gardiner Professor of Music, Glasgow University	
Timothy Byram-Wigfield	Christ Church, Oxford	1982–1985	Sub-organist of Winchester Cathedral, organist of St Mary's Cathedral, Edinburgh, St George's Chapel, Windsor. Director of Music at Jesus College, Cambridge, and now at All Saints, Margaret Street.	
Andrew Cantrill	College of St. Hild and St. Bede, Durham	1987–1991	Director of Music at Saint Paul's Cathedral, Wellington and organist and master of choristers at Croydon Minster	
Benjamin Chewter	Emmanuel College, Cambridge	2003–2006	Assistant Director of Music at Chester Cathedral, subsequently Organist of the Metropolitan Tabernacle, London	
Nicholas Cleobury	Worcester College, Oxford	1968–1971	Assistant Organist of Chichester Cathedral and Christ Church Cathedral, Oxford	
Stephen Cleobury	St John's College, Cambridge	1967–1971	Master of Music at Westminster Cathedral, director of music at King's College, Cambridge	
Norman Cocker	Merton College, Oxford	1907–1909	Organist of Manchester Cathedral	
Gary Cole	Emmanuel College, Cambridge	1979–1981	Founder of Regent Records, UK. Recipient of the Medal of the Royal College of Organists (2025) in recognition of distinguished achievement in choral and organ recording	
E. T. Cook	The Queen's College, Oxford		Organist of Southwark Cathedral	
John Cook	Christ's College, Cambridge		Organist of St. Paul's Cathedral (London, Ontario)	
Deryck Cooke	Selwyn College, Cambridge	1938–40, 1946–1947	Broadcaster and musicologist	
David Cooper	Lincoln College, Oxford	1967–1970	Organist of Norwich Cathedral	
Joseph Cooper	Keble College, Oxford	1931–1934		
Robert Costin	Pembroke College, Cambridge	1990–1993	Assistant director of music at Blackburn Cathedral, director of music at Rugby School Thailand	
Stephen Darlington	Christ Church, Oxford	1971–1974	Organist of St Albans Cathedral and Christ Church Cathedral, Oxford	
Andrew Davis	King's College, Cambridge	1963–1966	Chief Conductor of the BBC Symphony Orchestra	
Christopher Dearnley	Worcester College, Oxford	1948–1952	Organist of Salisbury Cathedral and St Paul's Cathedral	
Ralph Downes	Keble College, Oxford	1925–1928	Professor of organ at the Royal College of Music, organist of the London Oratory and designer and curator of the organ of the Royal Festival Hall	
Clive Driskill-Smith	Christ Church, Oxford	1996–1999	Sub-Organist of Christ Church Cathedral, Oxford	
Kingsley Charles Dunham	Hatfield College, Durham			
Richard Egarr	Clare College, Cambridge	1982–1985	Music Director of Academy of Ancient Music	
Richard Farnes	King's College, Cambridge	1983–1986	Music Director of Opera North	
Stephen Farr	Clare College, Cambridge	1984	Sub-organist Christ Church, Oxford, Sub-organist Winchester Cathedral, organist of Guildford Cathedral	
Iain Farrington	St John's College, Cambridge	1996–1999		
Thomas Fielden	Jesus College, Oxford	1905		
Jeremy Filsell	Keble College, Oxford and Gonville and Caius College, Cambridge	1982–1985	Organist of the Basilica of the National Shrine of the Immaculate Conception, artist-in-residence at Washington National Cathedral	
Roger Fisher	Christ Church, Oxford	1959–1962	Organist of Chester Cathedral	
William Glock	Gonville and Caius College, Cambridge	1926	BBC Controller of Music	
David Goode	King's College, Cambridge	1991–1994	Organist of Eton College	
Christopher Gower	Magdalen College, Oxford	1958–1961	Assistant Exeter Cathedral, Organist and Master of the Choristers Portsmouth Cathedral Master of Music at Peterborough Cathedral	
Steven Grahl	Magdalen College, Oxford	1998–2001	Organist & Director of Music at St Marylebone Parish Church, assistant organist of New College, Oxford, Director of Music, Trinity College, Cambridge	
Christopher Gray	Pembroke College, Cambridge		Organist and Master of the Choristers, Truro Cathedral (2008−2022); Director of Music, St John's College, Cambridge (2023−)	
Francis Grier	King's College, Cambridge	1973–1976	Organist of Christ Church Cathedral, Oxford	
Claudia Grinnell	Peterhouse, Cambridge		Organist of St Edmundsbury Cathedral, 2024−present	
Douglas Guest	King's College, Cambridge	1935–1939	Organist of Westminster Abbey	
George Guest	St John's College, Cambridge	1947–1951	Director of Music of St John's College, Cambridge	
Paul Hale	New College, Oxford	1971–1974	Rector Chori of Southwell Minster	
Charles Harrison	Jesus College, Cambridge	1992–1995	Organist and Master of the Choristers at Chichester Cathedral	
Edward Heath	Balliol College, Oxford	1935–1939	Prime Minister of the United Kingdom	
Gerald Hendrie	Selwyn College, Cambridge	1954–1957	Founding Professor of Music at the Open University	
Christopher Herrick	Exeter College, Oxford	1959–1962	Sub-Organist of Westminster Abbey	
Richard Hickox	Queens' College, Cambridge	1967–1970	Principal Conductor of the BBC National Orchestra of Wales	
Edward Higginbottom	Corpus Christi College, Cambridge	1966–1970	Director of Music at New College, Oxford	
David Hill	St John's College, Cambridge	1976–1979	Master of Music of Westminster Cathedral and at Winchester Cathedral, director of music at St John's College, Cambridge, director of the BBC Singers	
Martin How	Clare College, Cambridge	1949–1952		
Peter Hurford	Jesus College, Cambridge	1949–1953	Organist of St Albans Cathedral	
Marcus Huxley	Worcester College, Oxford	1972–1974	Organist of St Philip's Cathedral, Birmingham	
Daniel Hyde	King's College, Cambridge	2000–2003	Organist and Director of Music at Saint Thomas Church, New York (2016−2019); Director of Music at King's College, Cambridge (2019−present)	
Carl Jackson	Downing College, Cambridge	1978–1981	Director of Music of the Chapel Royal, Hampton Court Palace	
Rupert Jeffcoat	St Catharine's College, Cambridge	1989–1992	Organist of Coventry Cathedral, organist and director of music at St John's Cathedral, Brisbane	
Raymond Johnston	Peterhouse, Cambridge	1981–1984	Director of Music at St. Mark's Episcopal Cathedral, Minneapolis	
Edward Elwyn Jones	Emmanuel College, Cambridge		Organist of Harvard University	
Max Kenworthy	Brasenose College, Oxford	1996–1998	Assistant Organist of Saint Paul's Cathedral, Wellington	
John Keys	New College, Oxford	1978–1981	Organist of St. Mary's Church, Nottingham	
Charles Herbert Kitson	Selwyn College, Cambridge	1893	Organist of Christ Church Cathedral, Dublin	
James Lancelot	King's College, Cambridge	1971–1974	Sub-organist of Winchester Cathedral, organist of Durham Cathedral	
Anna Lapwood	Magdalen College, Oxford		Director of Music at Pembroke College, Cambridge and Associate Artist at Royal Albert Hall	
Stephen Layton	King's College, Cambridge	1985–1988	Director of Music, Trinity College, Cambridge	
Henry Ley	Keble College, Oxford	1906–1909	Organist of Christ Church Cathedral, Oxford	
Richard Lloyd	Jesus College, Cambridge	1952–1955	Organist of Hereford Cathedral and Durham Cathedral	
Simon Lole	King's College London		Director of Music at Sheffield Cathedral and Salisbury Cathedral	
Adrian Lucas	St John's College, Cambridge	1980–1983	Organist of Portsmouth Cathedral and Worcester Cathedral	
Andrew Lumsden	St John's College, Cambridge	1981–1984	Organist of Lichfield Cathedral and Winchester Cathedral	
David Lumsden	Selwyn College and St John's College, Cambridge	1948–1951 (Selwyn); 1951–1953 (St John's)	Organist of New College, Oxford and principal of the Royal Academy of Music	
Sarah MacDonald	Robinson College, Cambridge	1992–1995	Director of Music at Selwyn College, Cambridge, and of Ely Cathedral Girls' Choir	
Richard Marlow	Selwyn College, Cambridge	1958–1962	Organist of Trinity College, Cambridge	
Alexander Mason	Worcester College, Oxford	1992–1995	Organist of St Davids Cathedral	
William Neil McKie	Worcester College, Oxford	1921	Organist of Westminster Abbey	
Hugh John McLean	King's College, Cambridge	1951–1955	Dean, Faculty of Music, University of Western Ontario	
Andrew Millington	Downing College, Cambridge	1971–1974	Organist of Guildford Cathedral and Exeter Cathedral	
Dudley Moore	Magdalen College, Oxford	1955–1958	Comedian	
Herbert Murrill	Worcester College, Oxford	1928–1931	BBC Controller of Music	
Martin Neary	Gonville and Caius College, Cambridge	1958–1963	Organist of Winchester Cathedral and Westminster Abbey	
Andrew Nethsingha	St John's College, Cambridge	1987–1990	Organist of Truro Cathedral and Gloucester Cathedral, director of music at St John's College, Cambridge	
Michael Nicholas	Jesus College, Oxford	1957–1960	Organist of Norwich Cathedral	
James O'Donnell	Jesus College, Cambridge	1979–1982	Master of Music of Westminster Cathedral, organist of Westminster Abbey	
Nicholas O'Neill	Magdalen College, Oxford	1989–1992	Composer, former organist of St George's Cathedral, Southwark, composer in residence for the Parliament Choir.	
Boris Ord	Corpus Christi College, Cambridge	1920	Organist of King's College, Cambridge	
Robin Orr	Pembroke College, Cambridge	1929–1932	Organist of St John's College, Cambridge	
Harrison Oxley	Christ Church, Oxford	1951–1954	Organist of St Edmundsbury Cathedral	
Andrew Parnell	Christ's College, Cambridge	1972–1975	Assistant Organist of St Albans Cathedral	
Adrian Partington	King's College, Cambridge	1978–1981	Director of Music, Gloucester Cathedral	
Ronald Edward Perrin	Christ Church, Oxford	1949–1954	Organist of Ripon Cathedral	
Richard Popplewell	King's College, Cambridge	1955–1956	Organist of the Chapel Royal	
Denys Pouncey	Queens' College, Cambridge	1926–1928	Organist of Wells Cathedral	
Simon Preston	King's College, Cambridge	1958–1961	Organist of Christ Church Cathedral, Oxford and Westminster Abbey	
Jonathan Rees-Williams	New College, Oxford	1969–1972	Organist of Lichfield Cathedral and St George's Chapel, Windsor	
Christopher Robinson	Christ Church, Oxford	1955–1958	Organist of Worcester Cathedral and St George's Chapel, Windsor, director of music of St John's College, Cambridge	
Bernard Rose	St Catharine's College, Cambridge	1935–1939	Informator Choristarum of Magdalen College, Oxford	
Wallace Michael Ross	Balliol College, Oxford	1939	Organist of Derby Cathedral	
Brian Runnett	St John's College, Cambridge	1960–1963	Organist of Norwich Cathedral	
John Sanders	Gonville and Caius College, Cambridge	1952–1956	Organist of Gloucester Cathedral	
John Scott	St John's College, Cambridge	1974–1978	Organist of St Paul's Cathedral, director of music at St Thomas Church, New York	
Richard Seal	Christ's College, Cambridge		Organist of Salisbury Cathedral	
Geoffrey Shaw	Gonville and Caius College, Cambridge	1898–1901		
Edward Shearmur	Pembroke College, Cambridge	1984–1987		
David Stancliffe	Trinity College, Oxford and Lincoln College, Oxford	1961	Anglican Bishop of Salisbury	
Charles Villiers Stanford	Queens' College, Cambridge	1870	Organist and director of music, Trinity College, Cambridge; professor of music, University of Cambridge	
Charles Hylton Stewart	Peterhouse, Cambridge	1903	Organist of Rochester Cathedral	
Frederick Stocken	St Catharine's College, Cambridge	1986–1989		
Richard Tanner	Exeter College, Oxford	1989–1992	Organist of Blackburn Cathedral	
Alan Thurlow	University of Sheffield		Organist of Chichester Cathedral	
Paul Trepte	New College, Oxford	1972–1975	Organist of St Edmundsbury Cathedral and Ely Cathedral	
Thomas Trotter	King's College, Cambridge	1976–1979	Birmingham City Organist	
Jonathan Vaughn	St John's College, Cambridge	2000–2003	Assistant organist of Wells Cathedral; associate director of music at Christ Church, Greenwich, USA	
James Vivian	King's College, Cambridge	1993–1997	Director of Music at St George's Chapel, Windsor	
Frederick William Wadely	Selwyn College, Cambridge	1900–1903	Organist of Carlisle Cathedral	
Colin Walsh	Christ Church, Oxford	1974–1978	Organist of St Albans Cathedral and Lincoln Cathedral	
Mark Wardell	Royal Holloway College, London		Assistant Organist at Chichester Cathedral	
Sydney Watson	Keble College, Oxford	1922–1925	Organist of Christ Church Cathedral, Oxford	
Geoffrey Webber	New College, Oxford	1977–1980	Director of Music of Gonville and Caius College, Cambridge	
Peter White	St John's College, Cambridge	1956–1960	Organist of Leicester Cathedral	
William Whitehead	University College, Oxford	1990–1993	Sub-Organist of Rochester Cathedral	
Allan Wicks	Christ Church, Oxford	1941–1946	Organist of Canterbury Cathedral	
David Willcocks	King's College, Cambridge	1939–1940, 1945–1947	Organist of Salisbury Cathedral, Worcester Cathedral and King's College, Cambridge, director of the Royal College of Music	
Mark Williams	Trinity College, Cambridge	1997–2000	Assistant Organist of St Paul's Cathedral, Director of Music, Jesus College, Cambridge, Informator Choristarum, Magdalen College, Oxford	
John Scott Whiteley	Royal Holloway College, London	1968–1971	Organist Emeritus, York Minster	
Charles Wood	Selwyn College and Gonville and Caius College, Cambridge	1888–1889 (Selwyn); 1889–1894 (Gonville and Caius)	Professor of Music, University of Cambridge	
Peter Wright	Emmanuel College, Cambridge	1973–1976	Organist of Southwark Cathedral	
