= Mark Williams (organist) =

English organist and choral conductor

Mark Turner Williams (born 1978) is a choral conductor and organist. Since January 2017, he has held the post of Informator Choristarum, Organist and Tutorial Fellow in Music at Magdalen College, Oxford. He was Assistant Organist at St Paul's Cathedral from 2000 to 2006, and between 2009 and 2016 held the position of Director of Music at Jesus College, Cambridge.

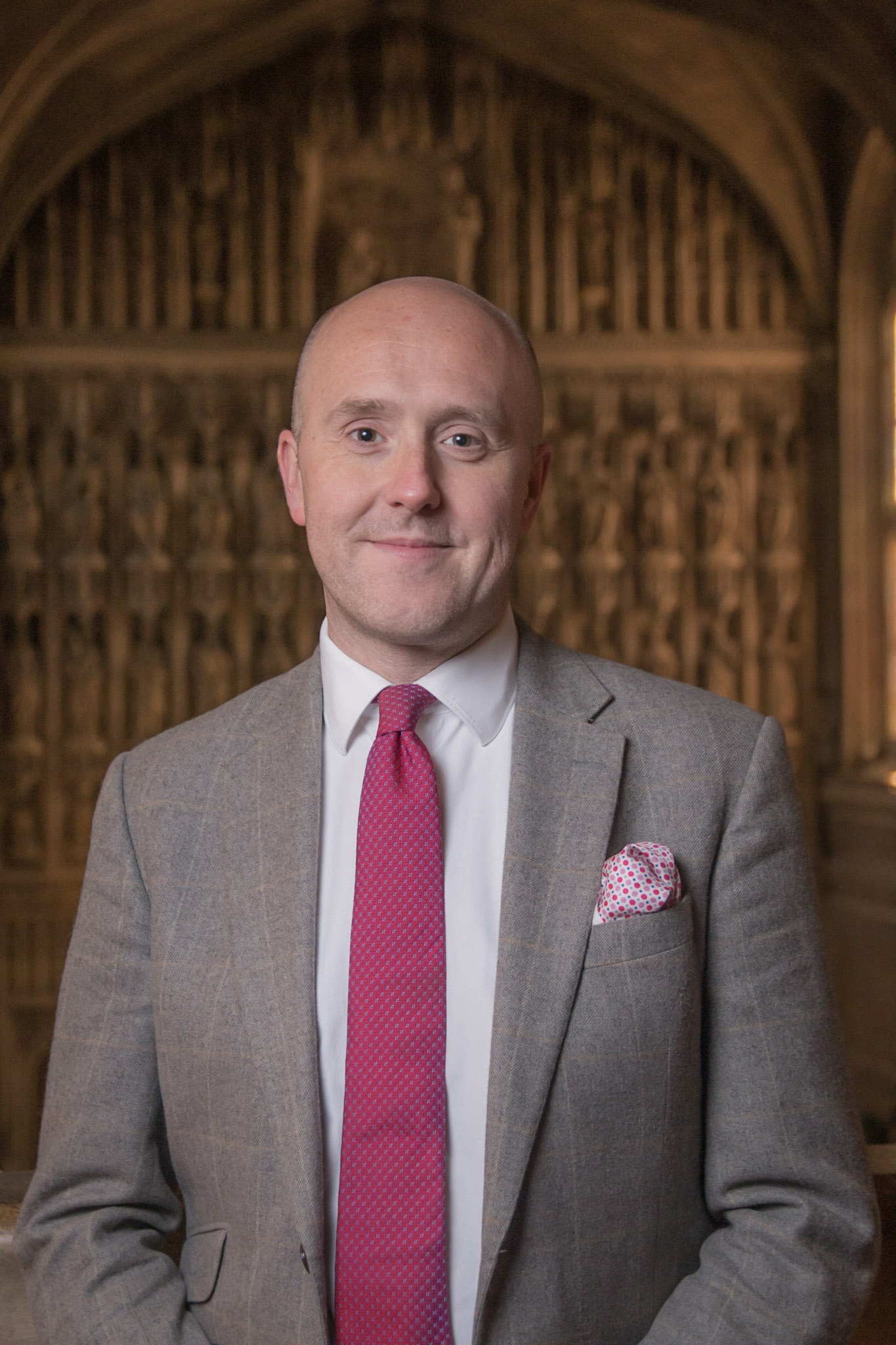
Mark Williams

Williams was organ scholar at Trinity College, Cambridge, from 1997 to 2000, under Richard Marlow. After graduating from Trinity College he became Assistant Organist at St Paul's Cathedral, and Director of Music at St Paul's Cathedral School. At 21 he was the youngest person ever to be appointed to these positions. In 2009 he succeeded Daniel Hyde as Director of Music at Jesus College, Cambridge. His other conducting roles include Principal Guest Conductor of the City of London Choir, and Artistic Director of the International William Byrd Festival.

He has also been involved with a number of charities. He has been a trustee of the Friends of Cathedral Music, and serves on the boards of Cambridge Early Music, the Oundle Music Trust, and the Harlton Organ Trust, and is a founding trustee of The Muze Trust, which supports music making in Zambia, and Songbound, a charity which sets up and supports choirs for under-privileged children in India. In 2013 he organised a tour of India by the choir of Jesus College, Cambridge, which included a week working with Songbound in the slums of Mumbai.
