= Choir of Gonville and Caius College, Cambridge =

- Choir
- Founder: Charles Wood
- Genre: Choir
- Members: 24 singers; 2 organ scholars
- Music director: Matthew Martin
- Website: www.gonvilleandcaiuschoir.com

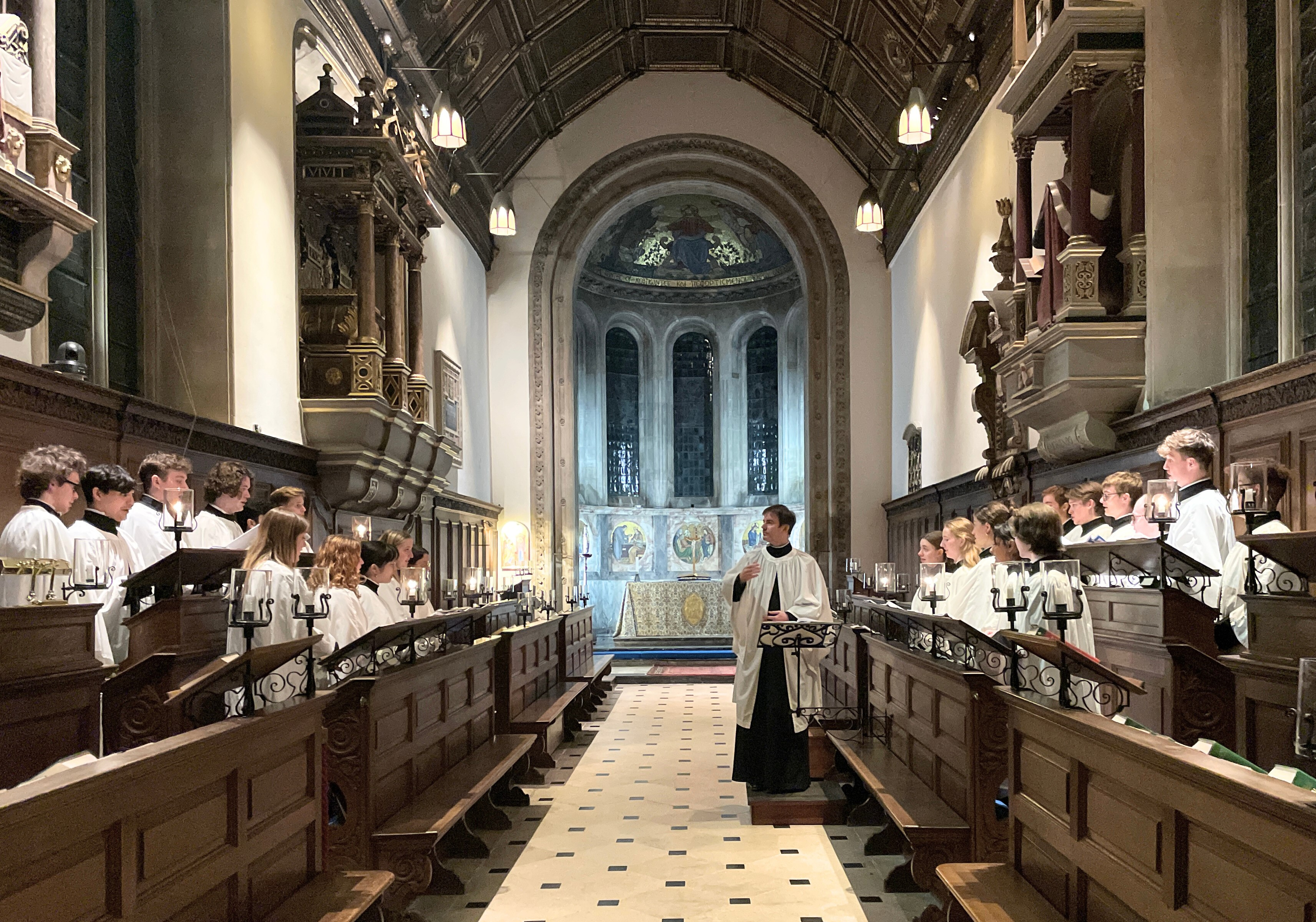
Caius Choir in Chapel

The Choir of Gonville and Caius College, Cambridge is a mixed choir of 24 voices. It is one of the UK’s collegiate choirs, with an international reputation for performances of quality but also for innovative and adventurous recordings. It tours regularly in the UK and around the world.

The College’s musical tradition began at the end of the nineteenth century with a choir of men and boys, founded by the celebrated composer of Anglican church music Charles Wood, and later became an exclusively undergraduate male choir under Wood’s successor the composer Patrick Hadley. Hadley was succeeded by Peter Tranchell, under whose direction the choir became mixed in 1979, and Geoffrey Webber directed the choir from 1989 until 2019. The current Director of Music (Precentor) is the Organist and Composer Matthew Martin.

== Choir Members and College Services ==
Members of Caius Choir include undergraduates and postgraduates studying at Caius and at other colleges. Caius undergraduates in the choir are known as Choral Scholars having applied through the Cambridge University Choral Award scheme - an official appointment made by the College to those who have already obtained an academic offer from Caius. The choir sings three services per week in the college chapel during term-time, on Sundays, Tuesdays, and Thursdays. At any one time Caius has two Organ Scholars who play a vital role in the activities of Caius Choir, accompanying and playing solo pieces for the regular services and for Radio 3 broadcasts, concerts at home and abroad, and CD recordings. As with Choral Awards, Organ Awards can only be held in conjunction with an academic place at the College.

== Recordings ==
The Choir’s recordings have often specialized in the re-discovery of forgotten choral repertories, including previously unpublished music from within the English choral tradition and beyond, as well as championing new music by British composers such as Judith Weir and Julian Anderson.

== Tours ==
Caius Choir has travelled extensively abroad, performing at a variety of venues ranging from major concert halls to universities, cathedrals and churches in Europe, America and Asia, often in connection with other professional ensembles such as Northern Ireland Opera, Philharmonia Baroque Orchestra of San Francisco, Malaysian Philharmonic Orchestra and Orchestre National Bordeaux Aquitaine.

== Discography ==
Recordings include:

- 1992 Wood: St Mark Passion & Holloway: Since I believe. ASV CD DCA 854
- 1993 Patrick Hadley & Edmund Rubbra - Sacred Choral Music. ASV CD DCA 881
- 1995 Puccini Requiem and Janáček Mass In E Flat. ASV CD DCA 914
- 1996 Samuel Wesley: Sacred Choral Music. ASV CD GAU 157
- 1998 William Child: Sacred Choral Music. ASV
- 1999 J. S. Bach - St Mark Passion, with The Cambridge Baroque Camerata. ASV CD GAX 237
- 1999 Christ Ascended: Swiss Religious Music of the 20th Century. Guild GMCD7177
- 1999 Zurich, Arise! Music from the Renaissance to the Baroque. Guild GMCD7175
- 2000 The Anthems of Charles Wood Volume 1. Priory PRCD 754
- 2001 The Anthems of Charles Wood Volume 2. Priory PRCD 779
- 2002 Sacred Vocal Music from 18th Century Switzerland. Guild GMCD7248
- 2002 Rheinberger: Sacred Choral Music. ASV CD DCA 989
- 2003 Complete Choral Music of Rebecca Clarke. ASV CD DCA 1136
- 2003 Robin Holloway: Missa Caiensis & other works. Dutton Digital CDLX 7134
- 2004 John Sanders (British Church Composers Series - 1). Priory PRCD 831
- 2005 Charles Gounod: Sacred Choral Works. Centaur CRC 2848
- 2006 All the Ends of the Earth: Contemporary & Medieval Vocal Music. Signum SIGCD070
- 2007 More sweet to hear: Organs and Voices of Tudor England. OxRecs OXCD-101
- 2007 William Turner: Sacred Choral Works. Delphian DCD34028
- 2008 Michael Wise: Sacred Choral Music. Delphian DCD34041
- 2009 Into this world this day did come: Carols Contemporary and Medieval. Delphian DCD34075
- 2009 Rodion Shchedrin - The Sealed Angel, with the Choir of King's College London. Delphian DCD34067
- 2010 Mansel Thomas: Requiem. Ty Cerdd - Music Centre Wales TCMT1
- 2011 Judith Weir Choral Music. Delphian DCD34095
- 2012 Haec Dies: Byrd and the Tudor Revival. Delphian DCD34104
- 2013 Deutsche Motette: German Romantic Choral Music From Schubert To Strauss, with Choir of King's College London. Delphian DCD34124
- 2014 In Praise Of Saint Columba: The Sound World Of The Celtic Church, with Barnaby Brown Delphian DCD34137
- 2014 In Dulci Jubilo: A Caius Christmas. Delphian DCD34152
- 2015 Romaria: Choral Music from Brazil. Delphian DCD34147
- 2016 Chorus vel Organa: Music from the Lost Palace of Westminster. Delphian DCD34158
- 2017 Set Upon The Rood: New Music For Choir & Ancient Instruments, with Barnaby Brown, Bill Taylor, John & Patrick Kenny. Delphian DCD34154
- 2018 Julian Anderson: Choral Music. Delphian DCD34202
- 2018 Cantique de Noel: French Music for Christmas. Delphian DCD34197
- 2019 Supersize Polyphony: Striggio - Mass in 40 & 60 parts and Tallis - Spem in Alium with the Armonico Consort Signum SIGCD560
- 2023 Philips and Dering Motets. Linn Records CKD 717
- 2024 Matthew Martin: Masses, Canticles, Motets. Linn Records CKD 743
