= Max Kenworthy =

- Born: Huddersfield, West Yorkshire, England
- Known for: Organist

Max Kenworthy (born in West Yorkshire, England) has performed recitals throughout the United Kingdom, Australia and New Zealand and has undertaken recordings, broadcasts and tours in pipe organ, piano and conducting.

Max began playing jazz piano at school and has played with numerous ensembles in a variety of styles. After a prolonged absence from the jazz scene, Max decided to rekindle his interest in playing jazz music by forming his own trio – The Jazz-Tempered Trio – which is currently working on The Jazz-Tempered Clavier Project, a jazz interpretation of J.S. Bach's Well-Tempered Clavier.

Now based in New Zealand, Max arrived in October 2002 to take up the position of assistant organist at Saint Paul's Cathedral, Wellington. Since then he has given solo recitals around the country and has also performed with the New Zealand Symphony Orchestra and the Wellington Sinfonia, The Tudor Consort, the Orpheus Choir of Wellington, the Royal New Zealand Air Force Band and NZ's premiere contemporary music ensemble, Stroma. In addition to his performing, Max has frequently conducted not only the cathedral's four choirs, but also Wellington based chamber choir Cantoris. He is featured on the CD “Favourite Hymns; Cathedral Classics” and recorded his first solo organ disk Organum Maximum in 2006. Max began his musical career as a chorister at St. Paul's Cathedral, London. He started learning the organ at Bradford Grammar School before a year as Organ Scholar at Rochester Cathedral where he studied with Roger Sayer. Max then won an organ scholarship to Brasenose College, Oxford, studying with David Goode.

After leaving Oxford Max was appointed assistant organist at Hampstead Parish Church and subsequently organist at St. Mary's Church, Barnes, London. He continued to study organ with Jeremy Filsell while also teaching piano and organ at The London Oratory School and Latymer Upper School. He is still much in demand as a teacher, and currently tutors at Queen Margaret's College and St Mark's School in Wellington.

Max has recently given organ recitals at Wanganui Collegiate School, the Anglican cathedrals in Napier and Dunedin, and St. Andrew's Cathedral, Sydney.
