= Frederick Stocken =

British musician

(James) Frederick Stocken (born 1967) is a British composer and organist.

== Compositions ==
Stocken's music first reached a wide audience with Lament for Bosnia, which was released on CD (becoming the number one best-selling classical CD in Tower Records' London store during early 1994). He conducted the work at the opening of the Permanent Holocaust Exhibition at the Imperial War Museum with the strings of the Royal Academy of Music, and also in Sarajevo with the Sarajevo Philharmonic Orchestra. As the sleeve-notes to the CD explain, the work was also dedicated to Stocken's maternal grandmother, Rosa Bechhöfer, who was murdered in Auschwitz.

Other commissions for large forces include a ballet - Alice - written for the State Theatre in Gießen, Germany, and an orchestral mass - Missa Pacis - commissioned for the Brompton Oratory in London. His Violin Concerto was performed by the violinist Adam Summerhayes with the Surrey Sinfonietta in St John's Smith Square.

Stocken's First Symphony was commissioned by the Royal Borough of Kensington and Chelsea and performed by the Royal Philharmonic Orchestra conducted by Vernon Handley in the Royal Albert Hall, London and broadcast on Classic FM (UK). His Second Symphony, 'To the Immortal Memory', was premiered at St John's Smith Square, London, by the Young Musicians Symphony Orchestra conducted by James Blair.

Stocken has also written organ works and sacred choral compositions. Commissioners include Chichester Cathedral, The Southern Cathedrals Festival and The Worshipful Company of Musicians.

== Background ==
Stocken's father was British; his mother was a Jewish refugee from Nazi Germany.

Stocken was a chorister of Southwell Minster, a pupil at Chetham's School of Music in Manchester, and Organ Scholar of St Catharine's College, Cambridge. He also studied the organ with Peter Hurford, passing ARCO with five prizes, and FRCO with three prizes. His doctorate is from the University of Manchester for research on nineteenth-century harmonic theory relating to the music of Anton Bruckner. Howard Ferguson and Margaret Hubicki were compositional mentors in the early years of his career.

Alongside composing, Stocken is an organist and was Organist of St George's Cathedral, Southwark for a decade. He teaches organ at the Royal Academy of Music Junior Academy, having also taught supporting studies in the organ department of the Senior Academy, and for the Royal College of Organists. He is the author, with Anne Marsden Thomas, of The New Oxford Organ Method (Oxford University Press, 2020), amongst other books.

== Selected works as composer ==
- Lament for Bosnia, for string orchestra, first perf. 1993 by Eos, cond. Charles Hazlewood, The Royal Academy of Art. Commissioned by Todd Longstaffe-Gowan.
- Violin Concerto, first perf. 1996 by The Surrey Sinfonietta, cond. Jonathan Butcher, Adam Summerhayes (violin), St John's, Smith Square.
- Missa Pacis (Mass of Peace), first perf. 1997 by the choir and orchestra of the London Oratory, cond. Andrew Carwood. Commissioned by Peter Sefton-Williams.
- Alice, ballet, first perf. 1998, Orchestra of the Stadttheater, Giessen, cond. Herbert Gietzen, choreographed by Roberto Galván. Commissioned by the Stadttheater, Giessen.
- First Symphony (Symphony for the Millennium), first perf. 2000, Royal Philharmonic Orchestra, cond. Vernon Handley, The Royal Albert Hall. Commissioned by the Royal Borough of Kensington and Chelsea.
- Top of the Morning, for flute and piano (in Flute Time Pieces, Oxford University Press, 2004).
- Second Symphony (To the Immortal Memory), first perf. 2005, The Young Musicians Symphony Orchestra, cond. James Blair, St John's Smith Square.
- Come to your heaven you heavenly Choirs, for choir and organ, first perf. 2010, the choir of St Michael's, Cornhill, cond. Jonathan Rennert. Commissioned by the Worshipful Company of Musicians.
- Archangels, for organ (Banks Music, 2013), first perf. 2011, the composer, the Woodford Festival.
- Faith, Love, Hope, for organ (Banks Music, 2014), first perf. 2014, the composer, St Lawrence Jewry.
- The Prayer of St Richard of Chichester, for choir (Banks Music, 2015), first perf. 2015, the choir of Chichester Cathedral, cond. Charles Harrison. Commissioned by the Dean and Chapter of Chichester Cathedral.
- Gothic Fantasia, for organ, first perf. 2016, the composer, St George's, Hanover Square.
- Chorale Prelude on Gieb Fried o frommer treuer Gott, for organ, first perf. 2017, William Whitehead, the Bloomsbury Organ Day. Commissioned by Rebecca Hirst and Patrick Hartley for the Orgelbüchlein Project.
- Magnificat and Nunc Dimittis, The Chichester Service, for choir and organ, first perf. 2019, the combined choirs of Chichester, Salisbury and Winchester Cathedrals, cond. Charles Harrison, Chichester Cathedral. Commissioned by the Southern Cathedral Festival 2019.
- Mysterium Fidei - a journey towards faith, for organ, first perf. 2019, the composer, Rikkyo University, Japan.
- Gaudete in Domino, for handbell choir, first perf. 2019, the Handbell Choir of Rikkyo University, Japan, who commissioned it.
- The Transfiguration, for choir and organ, first perf. 2020, the choir of St Giles, Cripplegate, cond. Anne Marsden Thomas.
- Carol of the Annunciation, for choir and organ, first perf. 2021, Bury Choral Society, cond. Juan Ortuno. Commissioned by The John Bradburne Memorial Society.
- The Newman Mass, for choir, congregation and organ, first perf. 2021, St George's Cathedral, London.
- The Wisdom of Christ, for choir and organ, first perf. 2023, the choir of St George's Cathedral, London, cond. Jonathan Schranz. Commissioned by St George's Cathedral for its 175th anniversary.
- The Son of Man, for organ, 2024.

== Selected bibliography ==
=== Musicology ===
- Steblin, Rita; Stocken, Frederick (2007), "Studying with Sechter: newly recovered reminiscences about Schubert by his forgotten friend, the composer Joseph Lanz" Music & letters : a quarterly publication. - Oxford Univ. Press, ISSN 0027-4224, vol. 88.2007, 2, 226-265
- Simon Sechter's Fundamental-Bass Theory and its influence on the Music of Anton Bruckner (Lewiston, New York: Edwin Mellen Press, 2009)

=== Tutors and Methods ===
- Scale Shapes, using the Stocken Method, 5 vols (Chester Music, 2001, 2nd ed., 2009, 3rd ed., 2021)
- Graded Keyboard Musicianship; co-author, Anne Marsden Thomas, 2 vols (Oxford University Press, 2017)
- The New Oxford Organ Method; co-author, Anne Marsden Thomas (Oxford University Press, 2020)

== Discography ==
=== as composer ===
- Lament for Bosnia (CD single, Chatsworth, 1994) - double-sided single performed by Queens Orchestra (b/w 'Adagio for Strings' by Samuel Barber).
- Haflidi’s Pictures (CD album, Priory, 2009) - features 'Bagatelle (for piano)'.
- Here is Joy! (CD album, Priory, 2012) features Come to your heaven, you heavenly choirs (choir and organ).

=== as performer ===
- Dedication in Time: Chamber Music by Margaret Hubicki (CD album, Chandos Music, 2005) - featured pianist on final track ('Goladon Suite').
- O Sacrum Convivium (CD album, Priory, 2017) - playing organ with the choir of St George's Cathedral, Southwark. cond. Norman Harper.
- Christmas at St George's (CD album, Priory, 2018) - playing organ with the choir of St George's Cathedral, Southwark, cond. Norman Harper.
