= Andrew Linn =

Andrew Linn is a linguist, historian and academic administrator. He is currently the Head of the College of Liberal Arts and Sciences and Pro Vice-Chancellor for Research at the University of Westminster.

== Career ==
Linn was born and grew up in Cheshire; and in 1986 won an organ scholarship at Emmanuel College, Cambridge, graduating with a bachelor of arts degree (BA) in English in 1989. He then worked as an organist in Norway, before returning to Cambridge to complete a master of philosophy degree (MPhil; 1990–91) in general linguistics and then a doctorate (PhD; 1991–94) in the history of linguistics. On completion of his PhD, he was appointed a lecturer in linguistics at the University of Luton, before moving to the University of Sheffield in 1997; he was appointed Professor of the History of Linguistics there in 2003 and five years later became Faculty Director of Research and Innovation. In 2007–08, he was a Leverhulme Fellow at the University of Bergen and in 2012 a visiting professor at the University of Paris 7–Diderot. In 2016, Linn was appointed Pro Vice-Chancellor at the University of Westminster and Dean of its Faculty of Social Sciences and Humanities. After the University restructured in 2018, Linn took on the role of Head of the College of Liberal Arts and Sciences and Pro Vice-Chancellor for Research.

He is also a fellow of the Norwegian Academy of Science and Letters and a strategic reviewer for the Arts and Humanities Research Council. Linn is the President of the UK society for the History of Linguistics (the Henry Sweet Society) and co-editor of the journal Language and History.

== Research ==
Linn's research focuses on the history of linguistics and language policy and planning. He has carried out research projects on Scandinavian linguistics. Published works include:

- Investigating English in Europe: Contexts and Agendas (Berlin: de Gruyter Mouton, 2016).
- (editor; with N. Bermel and G. Ferguson) Attitudes Towards English in Europe (Berlin: de Gruyter Mouton, 2015)
- "From Voss to New York: Norwegian transmigration to America and the use of virtual worlds in historical research", Historisk Tidsskrift, 94:2 (2015), pp. 229–255.
- (editor; with A. Lynn and C. Hadjidemetriou) English in the Language Ecology of 'High Proficiency' European countries (Berlin: de Gruyter Mouton, 2014).
- "Parallel languages in the history of language ideology in Norway and the lesson for Nordic higher education", in Hultgren, A. K., Gregersen, F., and Thøgersen, J. (ed.), English in Nordic Universities: Ideologies and Practices (Amsterdam: John Benjamins, 2014), pp. 27–52
- "Vernaculars and the idea of a standard language", in Allan, K. (ed.), The Oxford Handbook of the History of Linguistics (Oxford: Oxford University Press, 2013), pp. 359–374
- "Impact: Linguistics in the real world", Histoire Epistemologie Langage, 33:1 (2011), pp. 15–27.
- "Voices from above—voices from below. Who’s talking and who’s listening in Norwegian language politics?", Current Issues in Language Planning, 11:2 (2010), pp. 114–129.
- "Can parallelingualism save Norwegian from extinction?", Multilingua, 29:3–4 (2010), pp. 289–305.
- Johan Storm: Dhi Grétest Pràktikal LiNgwist in Dhi Werld (Oxford: Blackwell, 2004).
- Constructing the Grammars of a Language: Ivar Aasen and Nineteenth-Century Norwegian Linguistics (Munster: Nodus Publikationen, 1997).

Preceded by Professor Roland Dannreuther	Dean of the Faculty of Social Sciences and Humanities, University of Westminster; Since 2016	Succeeded by Incumbent
