= Putnam Cottage =

- Knapp Tavern
- U.S. National Register of Historic Places
- U.S. Historic district – Contributing property
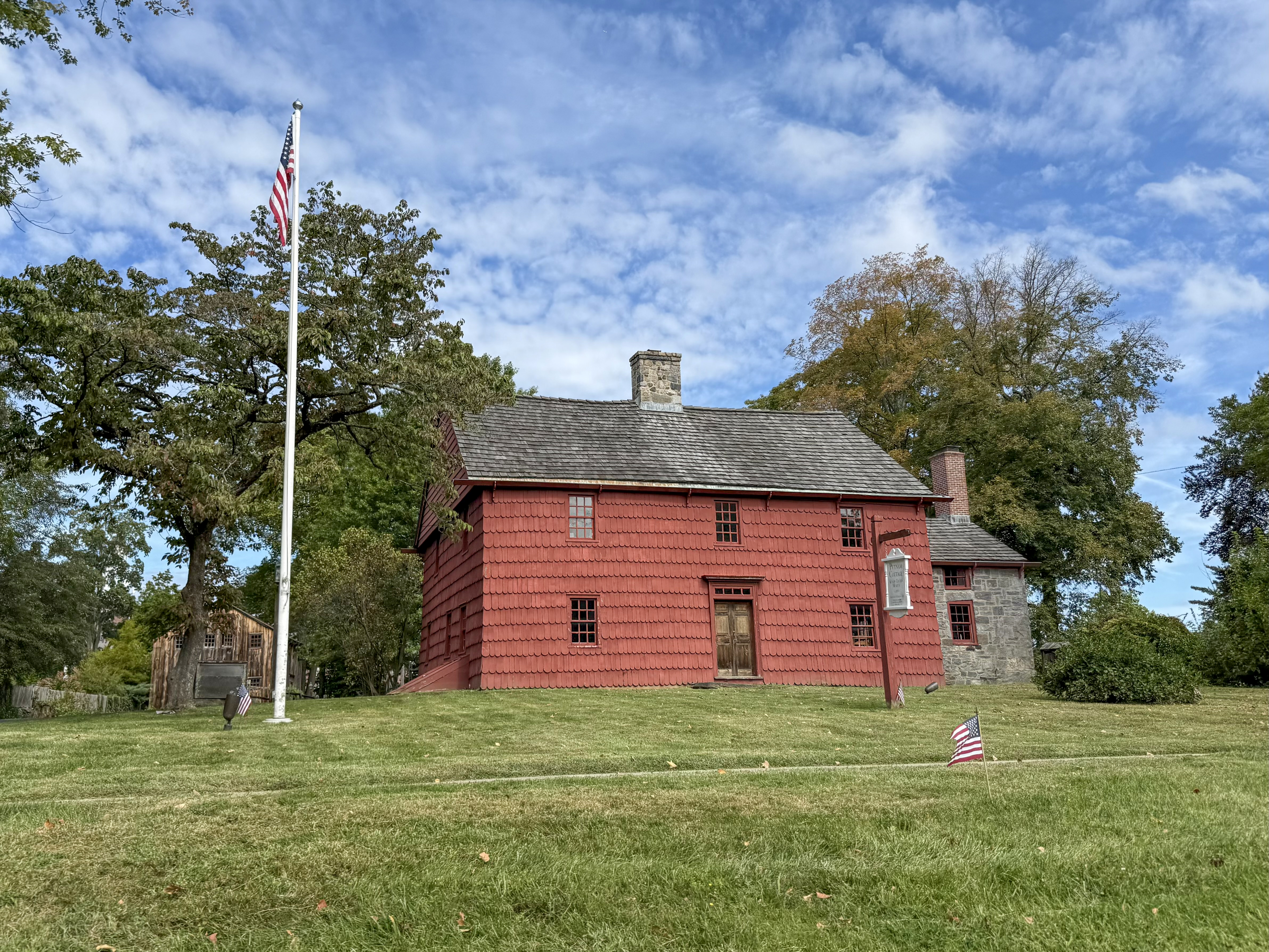
- Putnam Cottage "Knapp's Tavern"

- Location within Connecticut Location within the United States
- Location: 243 East Putnam Avenue, Greenwich, Connecticut
- Coordinates: 41°2′13″N 73°37′10″W
- Built: 1690
- Architectural style: Colonial Georgian
- Part of: Putnam Hill Historic District (ID79002657)
- NRHP reference No.: 77001389

Significant dates
- Added to NRHP: September 15, 1977
- Designated CP: August 24, 1979

Putnam Cottage was also known as Knapp Tavern during the American Revolution. It is located at 243 East Putnam Avenue (U.S. Route 1), on the former route of the Boston Post Road, in Greenwich, Connecticut.

== Early history ==
Early records show that in February 1680, a Greenwich Town Meeting ordered Justus Bush, John Lockwood and Joseph Ferris to lay out a township upon the land lying nearby Horseneck Brook, to number twenty home lots of four acres each and a piece of land for a common. Captain Israel Knapp bought the Horseneck property in 1692. Architectural historians have stated that the east front room could have been built prior to this date. A house was built on site possibly during the first quarter of the 1700s.

By 1750 the original home had been expanded by Timothy Knapp for use as a small tavern, and was a gathering place for the local Freemasons. It became known as Knapp's Tavern from 1754 on and during the American Revolution particularly. The tavern served locals, travelers, militia and also many Continental troops during the American Revolutionary War. In 1776, General George Washington stopped there with his troops for lunch, as evidenced by his expense report on file with the Smithsonian Institution.

== The American Revolution ==
Knapp's Tavern became chiefly associated with General Israel Putnam and his historic escape from the British on February 26, 1779, at the Battle of Horse Neck (Greenwich), at a place close to the tavern.

=== The Battle of Horse Neck ===
On the evening of February 24, a battalion of British troops was formed; consisting of companies from the 17th of Foot, the 44th of Foot and the 57th of Foot, also a company of Hessian Guards, a Loyalist company of Emmerick's chasseurs and dragoons, and the Loyal American Regiment, plus a small detachment of the royal artillery. Commanded by Major-General William Tryon, the British marched from King's Bridge, and proceeded to Horse Neck, in Connecticut, where they arrived on the morning of February 26.

As the battalion entered the town, they were halted by locals and militia tearing up the bridge at Byram. A company of the 5th Connecticut, and more militia, was stationed on Put's Hill near Knapp's Tavern, under the command of General Putnam. The Continentals exchanged fire with the British but soon retired in good order, leaving their three field-pieces (four-pounders) behind them. The British spiked the artillery, and also captured a large quantity of ammunition and stores found nearby.

A detachment of the 17th and 44th of Foot was sent into the village of Greenwich, where they destroyed the local saltworks, more military stores, a fishing schooner, and two small ketches; after which they rejoined the rest of the battalion at Elizabeth's Point. Determining that more Continental and militia troops would arrive the next morning, Tryon ordered the battalion back to King's Bridge.

=== Putnam's Ride ===
Gen Putnam was pursued by British dragoons, and was forced to ride down Put's Hill, in order to elude capture. This historic scene is depicted on the seal of the Town of Greenwich, and the name of Putnam is found throughout the State of Connecticut.

== Later history ==
In the 19th century changes were made to the structure: ceilings were raised, windows were changed, and a porch was added on the front. In 1906, the house was purchased by the Israel Putnam House Association, Inc. Since 1910, the property has been the Historic Preservation Project of the Putnam Hill Chapter Daughters of the American Revolution. The DAR raised funds to restore its 17th century appearance to coincide with the United States Bicentennial in 1976. The Cottage, the colonial garden, and a replica of the outhouse may be viewed by arrangement with the Putnam Hill Chapter DAR.

Putnam Cottage is currently maintained as a Revolutionary-era tavern museum open to the public. The museum also provides education in the town's history as well as recreating drama in the occasional reenactments of Revolutionary War events.

== Pictures ==
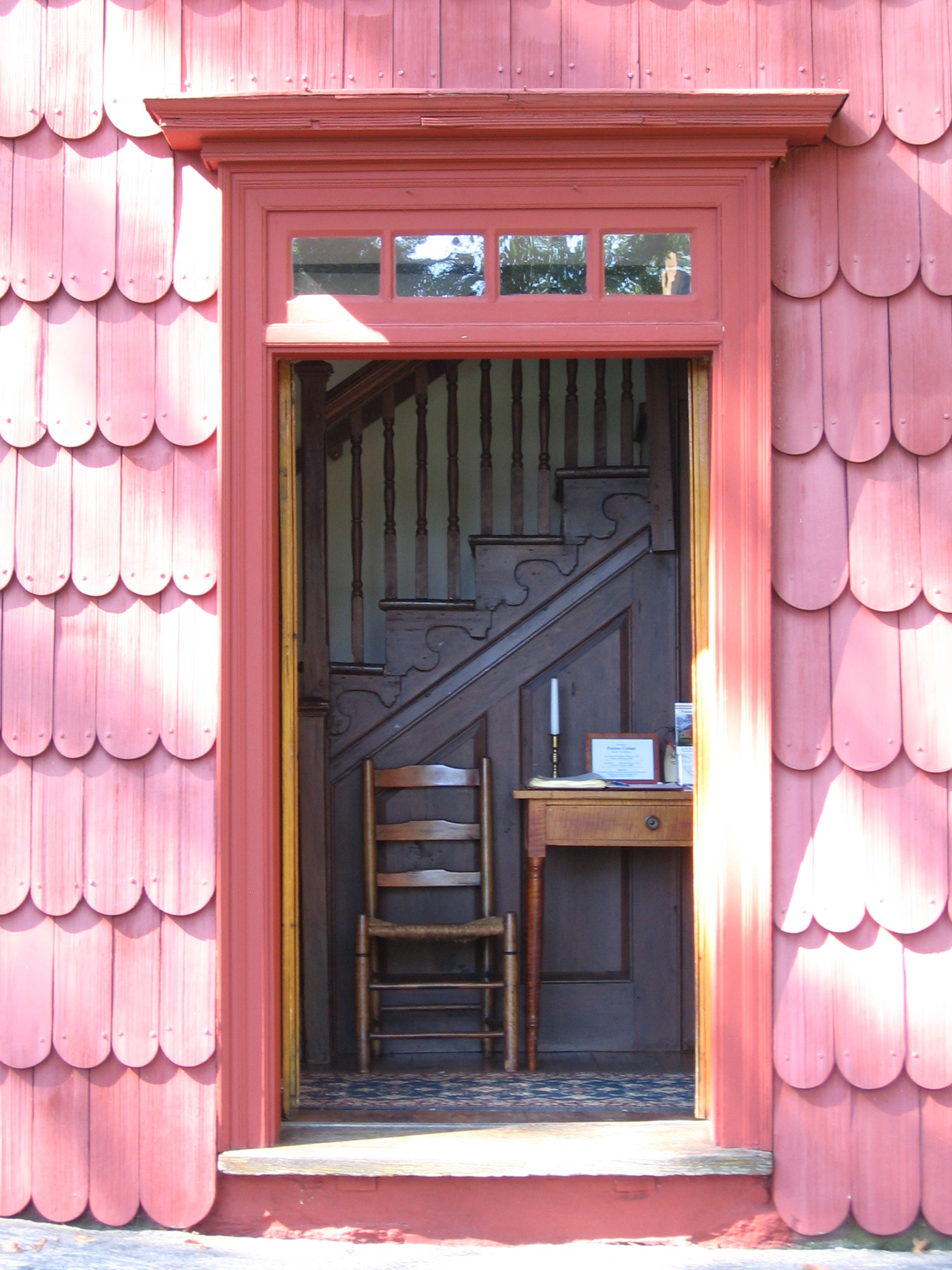
Front entrance

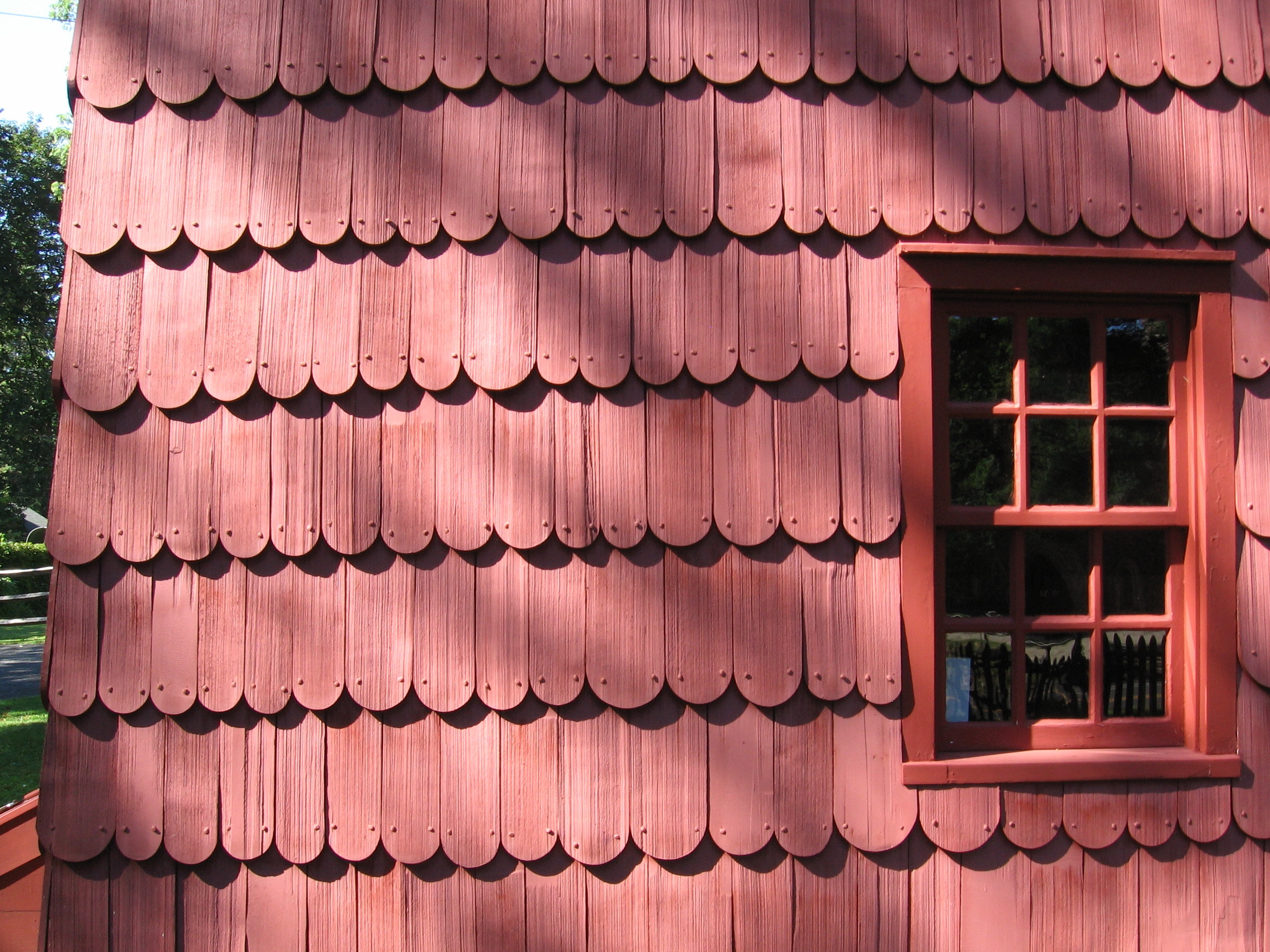
Fish-scale siding

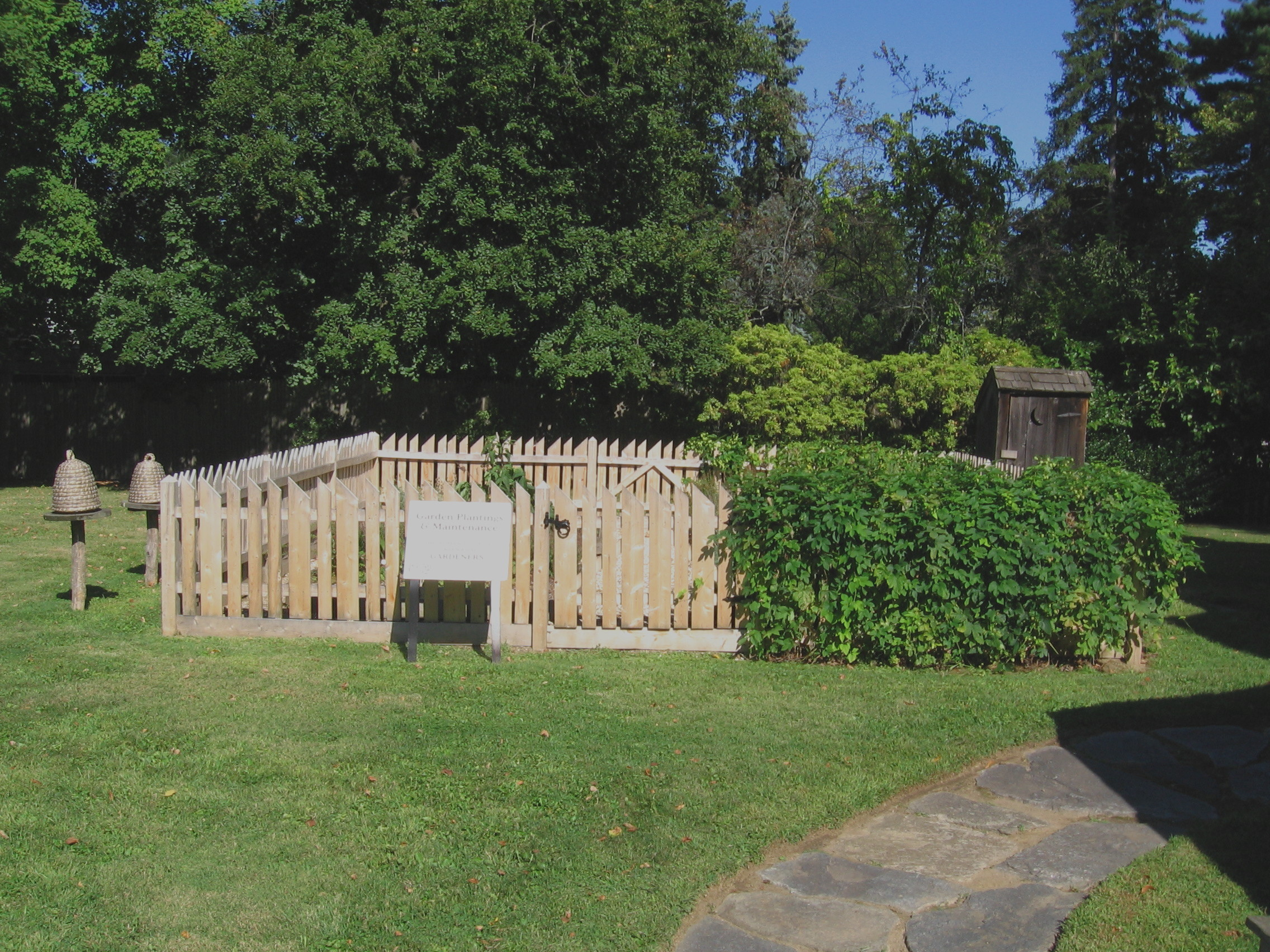
Colonial garden

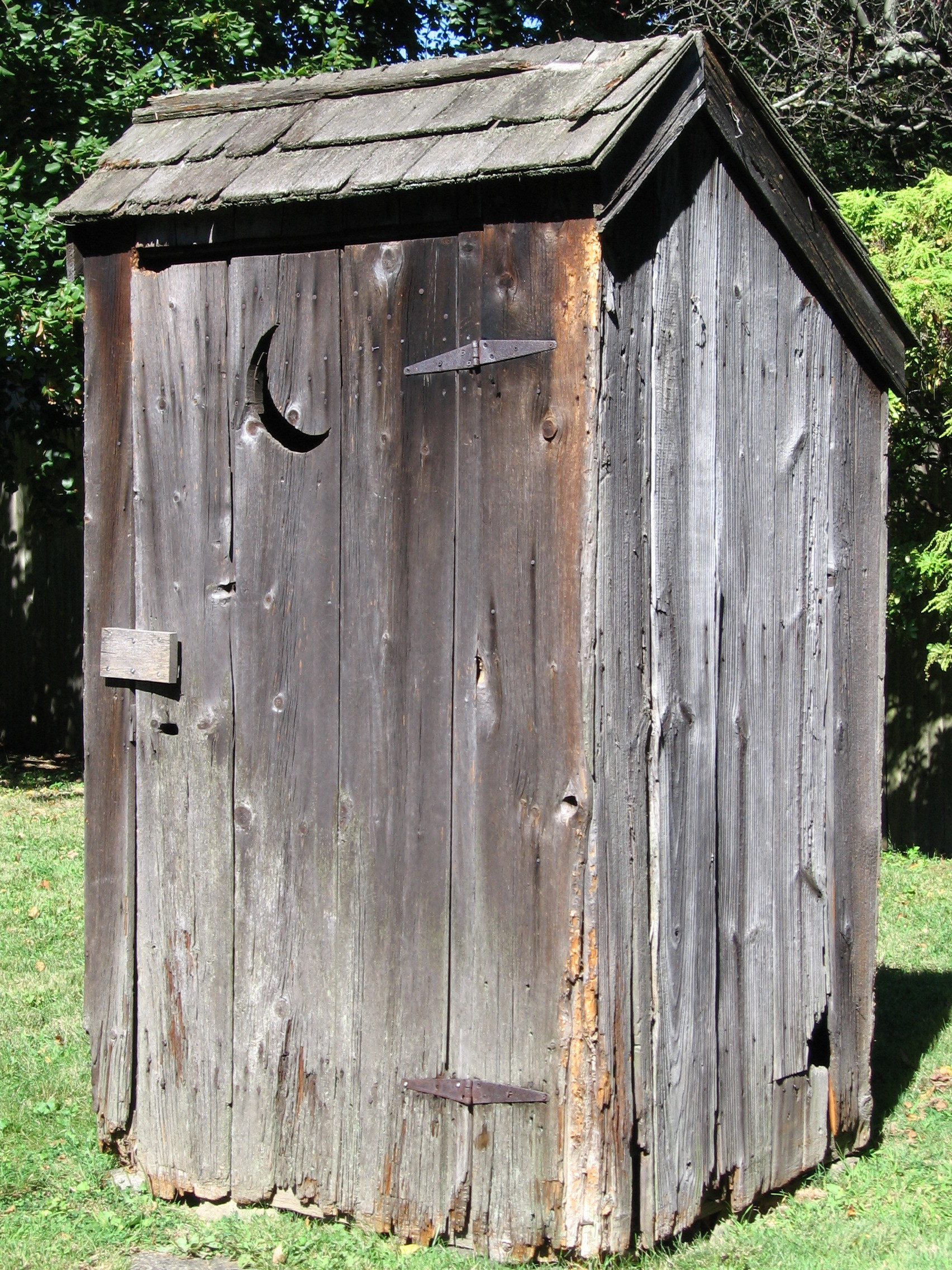
Outhouse replica on the grounds

== See also ==
- List of the oldest buildings in Connecticut
- National Register of Historic Places listings in Greenwich, Connecticut
