= Second Congregational Church of Greenwich =

Historic church in Greenwich, Connecticut, United States

- U.S. Historic district – Contributing property
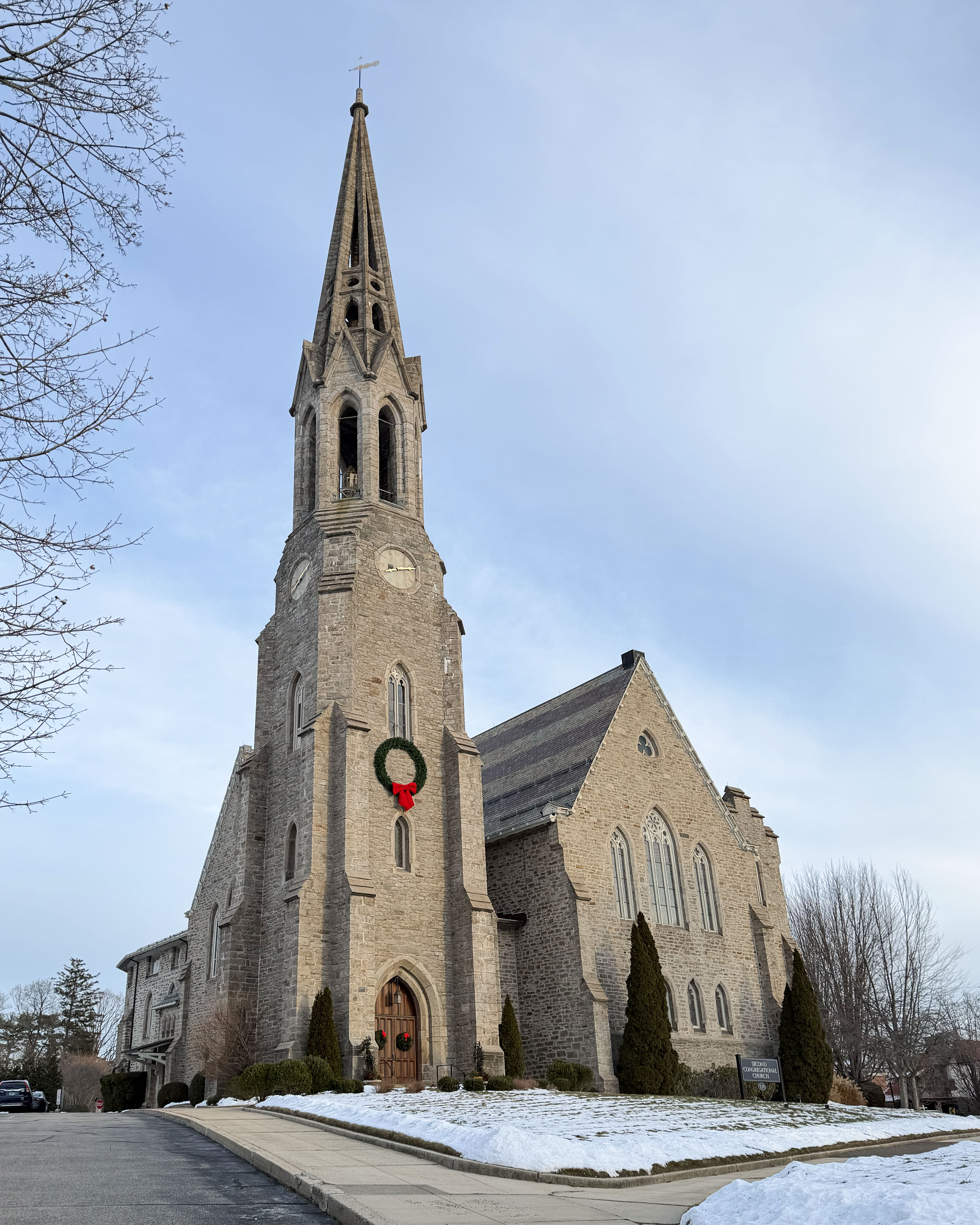
- Exterior, 2025

- Location within Connecticut Location within the United States
- Location: 139 East Putnam Avenue, Greenwich, Connecticut
- Coordinates: 41°02′07.6″N 73°37′22.8″W
- Built: 1856
- Architect: Leopold Eidlitz
- Architectural style: Gothic Revival
- Part of: Putnam Hill Historic District (ID79002657)
- Designated CP: August 24, 1979

The Second Congregational Church of Greenwich is a historic church on East Putnam Avenue (U.S. Route 1) in Greenwich, Connecticut. Built in 1856, the stone building is a local example of mid-19th-century Gothic Revival architecture. The congregation is affiliated with the United Church of Christ.

== Description and history ==
The church occupies a prominent corner site at the intersection of East Putnam Avenue and Maple Avenue on Putnam Hill. The rectangular granite masonry structure, designed by Leopold Eidlitz, has a steeply pitched roof finished in patterned slate. A square stone entrance tower extends from the principal façade and rises to an open belfry and tall spire, making the church a landmark in central Greenwich. Gothic Revival detailing includes grouped lancet windows and a trefoil window set high in the gable, with similar window groupings on the side elevations and transepts. Some early stained glass survived into the 20th century, although much of the glazing was replaced during the 1960s with abstract stained-glass windows.

The congregation traces its origins to Greenwich's colonial-era Congregational societies, with local accounts dating the church's beginnings to 1705. In the early 20th century, a one-story chapel addition designed in a compatible Gothic style was added to the church, with a larger rear wing of buff brick constructed around 1960. The church is a contributing property in the Putnam Hill Historic District, listed on the National Register of Historic Places in 1979. In 2018, it received a Greenwich Landmark plaque from the Greenwich Historical Society.

== See also ==
- Putnam Hill Historic District
- National Register of Historic Places listings in Greenwich, Connecticut
