= Benjamin Bayl =

- Born: 1978 (age 46–47); Sydney
- Occupation: Conductor
- Website: benjaminbayl.com

Benjamin Bayl is a Dutch and Australian conductor who works with symphony and chamber orchestras, opera houses and period instrument orchestras in Europe, Asia and Australia.

== Early life and education ==
In 1997, Bayl was the first Australian to become Organ Scholar of King's College, Cambridge, and he later studied at the Royal Academy of Music with Colin Metters and George Hurst.

== Career ==
In his earlier years he played basso continuo for Concerto Copenhagen, Monteverdi Choir, English Baroque Soloists, The English Concert, The Sixteen, Gabrieli Consort & Players and His Majestys Sagbutts & Cornetts.

In 2006 he was appointed Assistant Conductor to the Budapest Festival Orchestra and Iván Fischer at the beginning of his career.

He is a founder and conductor of Australian Romantic & Classical Orchestra (formerly orchestra seventeen88), Artistic Director of Odissea Orchestra & Choir and was founder and Artistic Director of London's Orchestra of the City and Saraband Consort. He continues to work in Budapest and with the Konzerthaus Orchester Berlin. He was also Assistant Artistic Director of the Gabrieli Consort.

He has made debuts in recent seasons with the Mahler Chamber Orchestra (Musikfest Berlinin the Berlin Philharmonie, and Ruhrtrienniale Festival), Malaysian Philharmonic Orchestra, Royal Philharmonic Orchestra, Orquesta Sinfónicadel Principado de Asturias, Orchestre Symphonique et Lyrique de Nancy, RTV Slovenia Symphony Orchestra, Orchestra Haydn di Bolzano, Britten Sinfonia, The Hanover Band, Wroclaw Baroque Orchestra, Leopoldinum Chamber Orchestra, Collegium Vocale Gent, and the Scandinavian orchestras of Gävle, Umeå, Drottningholm, Aarhus, Odense, Aalborg, Sønderjyllands and Copenhagen Philharmonic.

In the world of opera, he has conducted for Opera Australia (Orlando), Staatsoper Berlin / Akademie für Alte Musik Berlin (Fairy Queen/AscheMond), Opera de Oviedo (Agrippina), Royal Danish Opera (Don Giovanni), Den Jyske Opera (Così fan tutte), NorrlandsOperan (Le nozze di Figaro), Taipei Symphony Orchestra (La Clemenza di Tito), Teatro Comunale di Sassari (Carmen) and English Touring Opera (Ariodante). He also conducted Dido & Aeneas and Fairy Queen in Berlin, Split and Zagreb Summer Festivals, Handel's Acis & Galatea and Arne's Judgement of Paris at the Wigmore Hall, Gluck's Il parnaso confuso at London's South Bank Centre, and both Monteverdi's L'incoronazione di Poppea and Cavalli's Gli amori d'Apollo e di Dafne for Københavns Musikteater. In the world of oratorio he has conducted the major works of Bach, Handel, Haydn and Mozart with both period and modern orchestras.

Benjamin has relationships with opera houses in Vienna, London, Amsterdam, Paris, Madrid, Barcelona, Valencia, Strasbourg, Copenhagen, and Sydney, with conductors including Gardiner, Maazel, Bolton, Bicket, and Hickox. He is Assistant Conductor and fortepianist for the new Deutsche Grammophon Mozart Operas cycle, having so far recorded Don Giovanni with Mahler Chamber Orchestra and Così fan tutte & Le nozze di Figaro with Chamber Orchestra of Europe, both with Yannick Nézet-Séguin. Other collaborations include Otello with Daniel Harding and Mahler Chamber Orchestra, Giulio Cesare with Emmanuelle Haïm and Le concert d'Astrée at Opéra National de Paris, and Gluck's Alceste with Ivor Bolton and Freiburger Barockorchester at the Wiener Staatsoper. He was also conductor-on-set for Juan, a new feature film based on Don Giovanni and directed by Kasper Holten.
