= Roland Dannreuther =

English scholar

Ronald Dannreuther is an international relations scholar and academic administrator, who has been Deputy Vice-Chancellor of the University of Westminster (since 2016) and formerly Dean of its Social Sciences and Humanities Faculty (2013–15) and Head of Politics and International Relations there (2009–13).

== Career ==
Roland Dannreuther carried out undergraduate study at the University of Oxford, before working as a consultant at Arthur Anderson. He then returned to Oxford to complete a doctorate in international relations (DPhil; 1994) with a thesis entitled The Soviet Union and the Palestine Resistance Movement. Dannreuther then taught at the University of Edinburgh (1995–2009) as a professor of International Relations. In the meantime, he was a research associate at the International Institute for Strategic Studies (1992–95), a Faculty Fellow at the Geneva Centre of Security Policy (2000–02) and an International Fellow at Tbillsi State University. In 2009, he was appointed Head of the Department of Politics and International Relations at the University of Westminster and then, between 2013 and 2015, he was Dean of the Faculty of Social Sciences and Humanities, after which was promoted to Deputy Vice-Chancellor with responsibility for student experience.

== Research ==
Dannreuther's research focuses on Russia, central Asia and the Middle East in the post-Cold War period, typically revolving around international relations and security in those areas. He has studied the domestic and foreign politics of Russia in relation to those areas, as well as China's energy strategy.

== Published work ==
=== Books ===
- International Security: the Contemporary Agenda, 2nd edition (Cambridge: Polity, 2013).
- (editor; with W. Ostrowski) Global Resources: Conflict and Cooperation (Basingstoke: Palgrave Macmillan, 2013).
- (with P. Andrews-Speed) China, Oil and Global Politics (London: Routledge, 2011).
- (editor; with L. March) Russia and Islam: State, Society and Radicalism (London: Routledge, 2010).

=== Book chapters ===
- "Energy security", in Burgess, J. P. (ed.), Handbook of New Security Studies (Abingdon: Routledge, 2010), pp. 144–153.
- "Europe and the Middle East: attempting to bridge the divide", in Tardy, T. (ed.), European Security in a Global Context: Internal and External Dynamics (London: Routledge, 2009), pp. 135–153.

=== Journal articles ===
- "EU-Russia Energy Relations in Context", Geopolitics, 21:4 (2016), pp. 913–921.
- "Energy security and shifting modes of governance", International Politics, 52:4 (2015), pp. 466–483.
- "Russia and the Arab Spring: supporting the counter-revolution", Journal of European Integration, 37:1 (2015), pp. 77–94.
- "Shifting dynamics of the insurgency and counter-insurgency in the North Caucasus", Ethnopolitics, 13:4 (2014), pp. 377–395.
- "Russia and the Middle East: a Cold War paradigm?", Europe-Asia Studies 64:3 (2012), pp. 543–560.
- "China and global oil: vulnerability and opportunity", International Affairs, 87:6 (2011), pp. 1345–1364.
- "Understanding the Middle East peace process: a historical institutionalist approach", European Journal of International Relations, 17:2 (2011), pp. 187–208.
- "Islamic radicalization in Russia: an assessment", International Affairs, 86:1 (2010), pp. 109–126.
- (with L. March) "Chechnya: has Moscow won?", Survival 50:4 (2008), pp. 97–112.
- "European neighbourhood policy – Selling the brand strategically", Studia Diplomatica, 61:3 (2008), pp. 47–58.

Preceded by Dr Jeremy Colwill	Dean of the Faculty of Social Sciences and Humanities, University of Westminster; 2013–15	Succeeded by Professor Andrew Linn
