= Putnam Hill Historic District =

Historic district in Connecticut, United States

- U.S. National Register of Historic Places
- U.S. Historic district
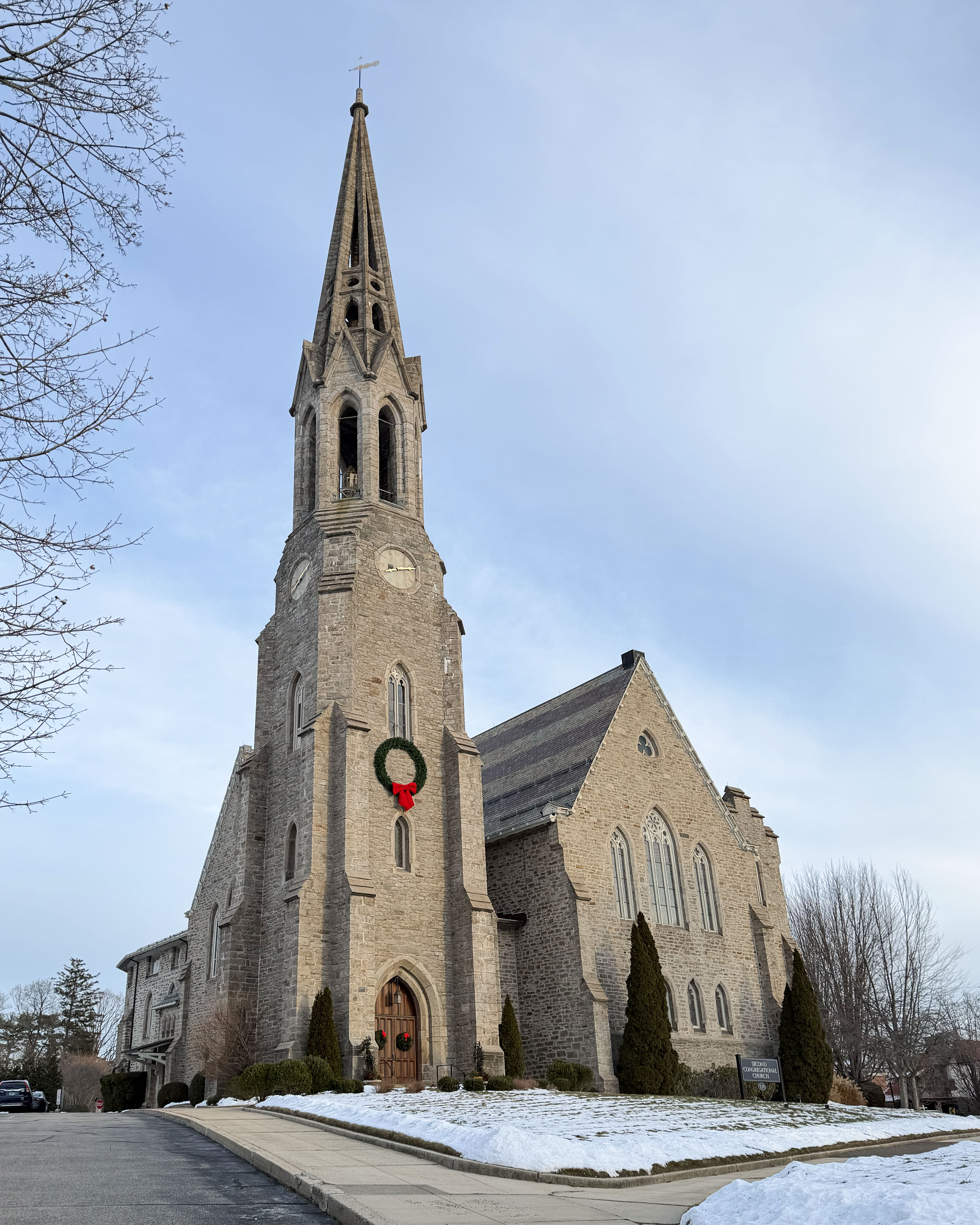
- Second Congregational Church

- Location within Connecticut Location within the United States
- Location: U.S. Route 1, Greenwich, Connecticut
- Coordinates: 41°2′11″N 73°37′9″W
- Area: 36 acres (15 ha)
- Built: 1830
- Architect: Vaux, Calvert; Multiple
- Architectural style: Mid 19th Century Revival, Late 19th and 20th Century Revivals, Late Victorian
- NRHP reference No.: 79002657
- Added to NRHP: August 24, 1979

The Putnam Hill Historic District encompasses a former town center of Greenwich, Connecticut. Located on U.S. Route 1 between Milbank Avenue and Old Church Road, the district includes the churches of two historic congregations, a former tavern, and a collection of fine mid-Victorian residential architecture. The district was listed on the National Register of Historic Places in 1979.

== Description and history ==
Greenwich's Putnam Hill area became a secondary center to the town (after Old Greenwich) at least as early as 1702, when the Second Congregational Church was located there. It was also home to Greenwich's town hall between 1825 and 1874, which was located where the town's Civil War memorial now stands. During the American Revolutionary War it was the scene of an escape of Continental Army General Israel Putnam from surrounding British forces by riding his horse down the steep hill from the Putnam Cottage, a feat that gave the area its present name. The Putnam Cottage, formerly Knapp's Tavern, was built about 1700, and is now a museum. In the years after the American Civil War, the area developed as a fashionable residential area, with several fine period residences surviving, including the Chateauesque Tomes-Higgins House, which was designed by architect Calvert Vaux. It was also where Boss Tweed had his country estate.

The district is basically linear in extent, running from Milbank Avenue in the west to Old Church Road in the east. The district has 21 contributing buildings, most of which are residential. They include two churches: the Second Congregational Church and Christ Episcopal Church. Other features of the district are two small parks, a stone marker placed by the DAR commemorating Putnam's ride, the imposing bluestone wall built by Tweed, and the gateway to the former Jeremiah Milbank estate.

== See also ==
- National Register of Historic Places listings in Greenwich, Connecticut
