= Michael Nicholas =

British organist, conductor and composer

Michael Bernard Nicholas FRCO, FRSCM (born 1938) is a British organist, conductor and composer, who was organist and master of choristers at Norwich Cathedral from 1971 to 1994 before becoming Chief Executive of the Royal College of Organists.

== Life ==
Nicholas was born in 1938 and educated at the City of London School and Jesus College, Oxford, where he was Organ Scholar and studied for a degree in music. He was awarded a Fellowship of the Royal College of Organists (FRCO) in 1958. After graduating, he became organist and choirmaster of St. James Church, Louth, 1960–1964 and during that time was the music master at King Edward VI Grammar School, Louth. He then became organist and choirmaster of St Matthew's Church, Northampton, 1964–1971, and was also Head of Music at Northampton Grammar School during this period. He subsequently was appointed organist and master of choristers at Norwich Cathedral, and held this position (together with a part-time lectureship in music at the University of East Anglia) from 1971 to 1994, when he was appointed Chief Executive of the Royal College of Organists. He was awarded an honorary Fellowship of the Royal School of Church Music (FRSCM) in 2018.

From 1999 to 2013, Nicholas was director of music at St Mary-le-Tower, Ipswich, where he conducted three choirs and promoted a lunchtime concert series. In addition to church choirs, he has conducted the Northampton Bach Choir and Orchestra, the Norwich Philharmonic Chorus and the Allegri Singers. He has published various works for choir and for organ, and has written Sightsinging (1966) and Muse at St Matthew's (1968).

He is a member of the Athenaeum Club.

His son, Benjamin, is director of music at Merton College, Oxford. He was a chorister under his father at Norwich Cathedral.

Preceded by Brian Runnett	Organist and Master of the Music, Norwich Cathedral; 1971 – 1994	Succeeded by David Anthony Cooper
