= David Anthony Cooper =

English cathedral organist

David Anthony Cooper (1949–2008) was an English cathedral organist, who served in Blackburn Cathedral and Norwich Cathedral.

== Background ==
David Anthony Cooper was born on 14 January 1949 in Derby. He was educated at Derby School and was then organ scholar at Lincoln College, Oxford.

He was Director of Music at Queen Elizabeth's Grammar School, Ashbourne from 1973 to 1977, a music master at St. Peter's School, York from 1977 to 1983, and music master at Queen Elizabeth's Grammar School, Blackburn from 1983 to 1994.

== Career ==
Assistant organist of

- Wells Cathedral, 1977–1983

Organist of:

- Blackburn Cathedral, 1983–1994
- Norwich Cathedral, 1994–1995

Cultural offices
Preceded by John Bertalot	Organist and Master of the Choristers of Blackburn Cathedral; 1983–1994	Succeeded by Gordon Stewart
Preceded by Michael Nicholas	Organist and Master of the Choristers of Norwich Cathedral; 1994–1995	Succeeded by Neil Taylor
