= Choral scholar =

Student who receives a scholarship for singing in a choir

A choral scholar is a student at either a university or a private school who receives a scholarship in exchange for singing in the school or university's choir. This is a common practice in the UK at schools attached to cathedrals where the choir is the cathedral choir, and at Oxford and Cambridge University Colleges, many of which have famous choirs.

The term is also used to refer to those who have taken a gap year to sing for a cathedral or abbey choir, generally taking on the same responsibilities as the choir's lay clerks. If the cathedral is linked to a cathedral school, the scholarship may also involve part- or full-time work at that school.

== See also ==
- Choir of Christ Church, Oxford
- Choir of Clare College, Cambridge
- Choir of Emmanuel College, Cambridge
- Choir of Gonville and Caius College, Cambridge
- Choir of King's College, Cambridge
- Choir of King's College London
- Choir of Magdalen College, Oxford
- Choir of New College, Oxford
- Choir of St John's College, Cambridge
- Choir of St Peter's College, Oxford
- Choir of Trinity College, Cambridge
- Choir of Worcester College, Oxford
- Peterhouse Chapel Choir, Cambridge
- St Catherine's College Choir, Cambridge
- Trinity College Chapel Choir, University of Toronto
- University of Exeter Chapel Choir
