= Matthew Martin (organist) =

English choral conductor, composer and organist (born 1976)

- Born: 1976 (age 49–50)
- Occupation: Precentor and Director of College Music at Gonville & Caius College, Cambridge.
- Works: Matthew Martin (organist) #Works
- Website: matthewmartincomposer.co.uk

Matthew Martin (b. 1976) is a choral conductor, composer, arranger and organist. His compositions are primarily religious, liturgical and non-liturgical in use, and have inspiration from various medieval traditions. He has collaborated with Jonathan Dove and Judith Weir, and has received commissions from other directors, such as Philip Rushforth and Harry Christophers.

== Early life and education ==
Matthew Martin graduated from Magdalen College, Oxford in 1997. He attended the Royal Academy of Music and was tutored on the organ by David Titterington in London and Marie-Claire Alain in Paris.

== Career ==
=== Early career ===
In 2000, Martin was appointed as organist at the University Church of St Mary the Virgin. In 2002, he was appointed organist at Canterbury Cathedral and played at the enthronement of Rowan Williams. From 2004 to 2010, he was Assistant Director of music at Westminster Cathedral. From 2015 to 2020, he was Director of Music at Keble College, Oxford, and Artistic Director of the Keble Early Music Festival.

=== Cambridge ===
In April 2020, he became Precentor and Director of College Music at Gonville & Caius College, Cambridge.

== Works ==
=== Masses ===
- Chester Missa brevis - For the centenary of Benjamin Britten and for liturgical use by the choir of Chester Cathedral (2013 Faber Music, 0571571743)
- Missa sperivamus
- Oratory Mass (English)

=== Canticles ===
- A Rose Magnificat
- St John's College Service
- Westminster Service
- Warwick Service
- The Fifth Service

=== Votive music ===
- Angelus et virginem - commissioned by King's College, Cambridge for the 2022 Festival of Nine Lessons and Carols (Latin carol arr. Martin, Matthew)
- Ave maris stella
- A Hymn To St Etheldreda
- A Hymn to St Therese
- O sanctissima
- Stabat mater - For the Genesis Foundation (2014)
- Salve sedes sapientiae
- O Salutaris Hostia, (2018)

=== Motets and Latin hymns ===
- Christe redemptor omnium
- Iustorum animae
- Laudate Dominum, (2015)
- Novo profusi gaudio, (2011)
- O Oriens
- O salutaris hostia (2020, Novello NOV297460)
- Sicut cervus, (2018)
- Sitivit anima mea
- Vidi aquam
- Christiani, Plaudite
- Psalm 150 (O praise God in His holiness), (2017)

=== English anthems, songs and carols ===
- Adam Lay Ybounden (traditional English carol arr. Martin, Matthew, 2006)
- Behold Now Praise The Lord
- In The Midst Of Thy Temple (2019)
- I Saw The Lord (In the year that King Uzziah died) (2012)
- I Sing Of A Maiden
- Nowell Sing We - For York Chapel (2014 Faber Music, 0571571379)
- When David Heard - For the 2012 Bergen Festival (2012 Faber Music, 0571571778)

=== Organ music ===
- Conditor alme siderum
- Fanfare - Ingrediente Domino
- Liebster Jesu, wir sind hier
- Prelude and Fugue for organ (2024)
- Prelude To "'Hark!' The Herald Angels Sing"
- St Albans Triptych (2019), commissioned by the St Albans International Organ Festival

== Discography ==
- Hope Soars Above - The Choir of St Marylebone Parish Church (1999) (Note: No label listed for this album)
- A Procession Of Chant And Polyphony From The Vaults Of Westminster Cathedral (Hyperion, 2009)
- Matthew Martin Plays The Walker Organ Of The London Oratory (Priory, 2013)
- Jubilate Deo: Sacred Choral Works (Opus Arte, 2015)
- Ceremonial Oxford: Music For The Georgian University By William Hayes (1708-1777) (CRD Records, 2018)
- Valls: Missa Regalis (AAM, 2020)
- Ave Rex Angelorum (CRD, 2020)
- Dove, Weir, Martin (Hyperion, 2022)
- Sur de nom d'alain (Ad Fontes, 2022)
- Philip & Dering: Motets (Linn, 2023)
- Matthew Martin: Masses, Canticles, Motets (Linn, 2024)

== Awards and achievements ==
In 2005, Martin was elected an associate of the Royal Academy of Music. The Rose Magnificat was the winning Choral category entry for the 2019 BBC Music Magazine Awards.
