= Jonathan Vaughn =

Jonathan Vaughn (born 1981) is a British-American organist and choir director who currently serves as the associate director of music at Christ Church, Greenwich, in Connecticut, USA. He was an assistant organist at Wells Cathedral for ten years and has held similar positions at other churches and cathedrals in England and the United States.

== Early life and education ==
Born in Croydon, England, Vaughn sang with the Addington Palace choristers under Martin How, whose encouragement led to Vaughn becoming an organ scholar at Croydon parish church at the age of 13. He studied at St Olave's Grammar School, during which time he won several prizes from the Royal College of Organists.

After spending a year as an organ scholar at St George's Chapel, Windsor, he went up to St John's College, Cambridge, where he was an organ scholar from 2000 to 2004, studying under Christopher Robinson and David Hill. He stayed at the College for another year after graduating, serving as assistant organist. He also studied with Dame Gillian Weir and was assistant conductor of the Cambridge University Musical Society.

== Career ==
From 2004 to 2007 Vaughn was assistant director of music at St Edmundsbury Cathedral before being appointed assistant organist at Wells Cathedral, where he served for ten years until 2017. He recorded five CDs with the Wells Cathedral choir and one with the Exon Singers, all under the direction of Matthew Owens.

After spending six months as interim associate organist at the Cathedral of All Saints in Albany, New York, Vaughn was appointed associate director of music at Christ Church, Greenwich, Connecticut, in 2017.

== Discography ==
- 2018 - Tchaikovsky at the Organ, for Regent Records
- 2017 - Before the Ending of the Day, with the Exon Singers, for Rubicon
- 2016 - A Wells Christmas, with Wells Cathedral Choir, for Resonus
- 2015 - The Armour of Light: The Choral Music of Gary Davison, with Wells Cathedral Choir, for Regent Records
- 2015 - Bob Chilcott: St John Passion, with Wells Cathedral Choir, for Signum
- 2013 - Wagner at the Organ, for Regent Records
- 2012 - Bingham: Choral Music, with Matthew Owens and Wells Cathedral Choir, for Hyperion Records
- 2012 - Jingle Wells, with Matthew Owens, Owain Park (organ) and Wells Cathedral Choir, for Regent Records
- 2011 - Songs of Sunshine, with Matthew Owens, and Wells Cathedral Choir, for Regent Records
- 2011 - Macmillan: Choral Music, with Matthew Owens and Wells Cathedral Choir, for Hyperion Records
- 2010 - Flame Celestial - Choral Music of David Bednall, Vol II, with Matthew Owens and Wells Cathedral Choir, for Rgent Records
- 2010 - Choral Music by Jonathan Dove, with Matthew Owens and Wells Cathedral Choir, for Hyperion Records
- 2010 - Awake up my glory – choral and organ music by Philip Moore, with Matthew Owens, Susan Hamilton (soprano) and The Exon Singers, for Regent Records
- 2009 - Mathias: Choral Music, with Matthew Owens and Wells Cathedral Choir, for Hyperion Records
- 2004 - WOOD, C.: St. Mark Passion, with Daniel Hyde and the Choir of St John's College, Cambridge, for Naxos Records
- 2004 - ELGAR: Sacred Choral Music, with Christopher Robinson and the Choir of St John's College, Cambridge, for Naxos Records
- 2003 - BERKELEY: Sacred Choral Music, with Christopher Robinson and the Choir of St John's College, Cambridge, for Naxos Records
- 1997 - Day By Day - Choral & Organ Music of Martin How, with Peter Nardone, Martin How (organ) and Croydon Parish Church Choir, for Regent Records
