= Christ Church, Greenwich =

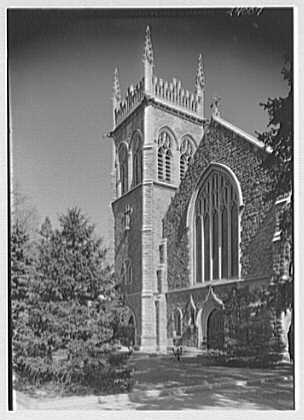
- Christ Church, Greenwich
- Christ Church, Greenwich
- 41.0362°N 73.6186°W
- Location: 254 East Putnam Avenue, Greenwich, Connecticut
- Country: United States of America
- Denomination: Episcopal Church (United States)
- Website: christchurchgreenwich.org

History
- Founded: 1749
- Consecrated: 1 June 1910

Architecture
- Style: Gothic Revival
- Years built: 1910

Administration
- Diocese: Diocese of Connecticut

Clergy
- Rector: The Rev. Marek Zabriskie
- Priest: The Rev. Tim Hamlin · The Rev. Suzy Post · The Rev. Terry Elsberry

Christ Church, Greenwich, is an Episcopal church in the Diocese of Connecticut, United States, located in the Putnam Hill Historic District along the Boston Post Road (U.S. Route 1) as it passes through Greenwich in Fairfield County, Connecticut. The parish was established in 1749, and the current church building dates from 1910. The church runs a number of programs and courses and is also known for its choirs.

The church reported 1,966 members in 2015 and 1,797 members in 2023; no membership statistics were reported in 2024 parochial reports. Plate and pledge income for the congregation in 2024 was $2,593,727 with average Sunday attendance (ASA) of 427.

== History of the parish ==
Anglican worship in Greenwich dates from 1705, when the first Church of England mission was established in the town with the help of the Society for the Propagation of the Gospel in Foreign Parts and the first services were conducted in a private home by the Rev. George Muirson, rector of nearby Grace Church in Rye, New York. Following the appointment of the Rev. Ebenezer Dibblee as missionary to Stamford and Greenwich in 1748, the congregation constructed a small wooden chapel, known as the Horseneck Chapel, on Putnam Hill. Services were held there until the chapel was destroyed in a gale in 1821.

A new chapel was built on the other side of Putnam Avenue (on the site of the present church) and consecrated in 1834. It was replaced by a larger church in 1857, and again in 1910 when the present building was completed.

== Buildings and architecture ==
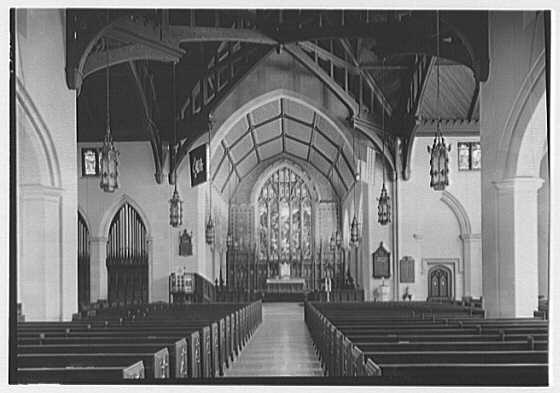
The interior of Christ Church, Greenwich.

The Christ Church campus comprises the church, chapel, parish hall, bookshop, nursery school and various administrative offices and other rooms.

The church, built of stone in the Gothic Revival style, features a square tower with battlements and pinnacles, and stained glass windows.

In 1839 a three acre plot of land was acquired next to the church for a cemetery.

The parsonage was built in 1843 and replaced in 1997.

== Music ==
Christ Church has an extensive music program, which follows the Royal School of Church Music certification course. There are six choirs for children and adults, currently directed by Jamie Hitel and assisted by Jonathan Vaughn, which sing regularly at services and concerts and have also conducted international tours, including to Canterbury Cathedral in 2022 and Westminster Abbey in 2024. Philip Moore, organist emeritus of York Minster in England, has been a visiting artist at Christ Church since 2009; and James O'Donnell, organist emeritus of Westminster Abbey and professor of organ at the Yale Institute of Sacred Music, was appointed artist-in-residence in 2023.

A new Harrison and Harrison pipe organ was installed in 2022, replacing the Austin Organs instrument dating from 1976.

== The church today ==
Christ Church offers regular services of worship, including Evensong, which are also livestreamed, and has a wide range of education and outreach programs.

It runs a nursery school, which opened in 1961, and a book and gift store, which opened in 1984.
