= Brian Runnett =

British organist and choral director (1935–1970)

- Born: Henry Brian Runnett; 1935; Tyldesley, Lancashire, England
- Died: 1970 (aged 34–35); London, England
- Education: Liverpool Matthay School of Music (FRCO); Durham University (BMus)
- Occupations: Organist; choral director
- Years active: 1951–1970
- Employers: St. Stephen's Church, Hightown; Church of St. Andrew, Litherland; Chester Cathedral; St John's College, Cambridge; University of Manchester; Norwich Cathedral; University of East Anglia
- Style: Classical; liturgical

Henry Brian Runnett (1935–1970) was a British organist and choral director. He was born in Tyldesley, Lancashire, in 1935 and was educated at the Liverpool Matthay School of Music, during which time he obtained the FRCO diploma with both Limpus and F. J. Read prizes in organ playing. His first organ post, at age 16, was at St. Stephen's Church, Hightown. From there he went to St. Andrew's, Litherland, before moving in 1955 to Chester Cathedral as assistant organist. In 1958 he obtained a BMus degree from Durham University. In 1960, he was appointed organ scholar at St John's College, Cambridge, under the Director of Music George Guest.

Following Cambridge, in 1963 he was appointed Lecturer in Music and University Organist at the University of Manchester and in 1967 moved to Norwich Cathedral as Organist and Master of the Choristers. He was a part-time lecturer at the University of East Anglia.

He recorded the Hindemith Organ Sonatas on the then-new Hill, Norman & Beard Chapel Organ at Ellesmere College in 1970 (LP; Cathedral Organ Masterworks CRMS-850).

In 1968, Runnett succeeded Dr George Guest as director of the Berkshire Boys Choir, a summer-resident choir of 46 boys and 14 men under the auspices of the Tanglewood Music Festival in the Berkshire Hills of Massachusetts (US). The choir had been founded and conducted in 1967 by Dr Guest. In the 1968 (summer) season, the choir appeared with the Philadelphia Orchestra and sang in Washington Cathedral and at Rutgers University and Syracuse University, among other venues. Eleven selections from their large repertoire were collected on an album for RCA Records (Alleluia, LSC-3081), with Lowell Lacey as the organist.

Runnett was killed in a car crash in 1970 whilst returning from an organ recital he had given in Westminster Abbey. Composer Kenneth Leighton was commissioned by the Cathedral Organists' Association to write a memorial work for Runnett – his Second Evening Service (Magnificat and Nunc Dimittis).

Norwich Cathedral named the Runnett Library in his memory, which contains all of his sheet music. It was donated to the cathedral by Runnett's parents following his death. St John's College, Cambridge, also has a Brian Runnett Memorial organ competition, as well as trophies given out afterwards.

Preceded by Heathcote Dicken Statham	Organist and Master of the Music, Norwich Cathedral; 1967 – 1971	Succeeded by Michael Nicholas
