= David Goode (organist) =

British organist

David Goode (born 1971) is a British organist and composer recognised for his concert career, recordings, and contributions to organ and choral music. Educated at Eton College and King's College, Cambridge, he was sub-organist at Christ Church, Oxford and Organist at Eton College from 2005 to 2022. Goode has appeared at major venues worldwide, including the BBC Proms, the Royal Festival Hall, and international festivals, and his discography includes complete recordings of the organ works of J.S. Bach and Max Reger. As a composer, he is known for works such as the Blitz Requiem (premiered at St Paul’s Cathedral in 2013) and Holy is the True Light (premiered in 2022).

== Life and career ==
Goode was a music scholar at Eton College and served as an organ scholar at King's College, Cambridge from 1991 to 1994, where he studied under David Sanger and Jacques van Oortmerssen. He graduated with a first-class degree and an MPhil.

From 1996 to 2001, he was Sub-Organist at Christ Church, Oxford. He won prizes at the 1997 St Albans International Organ Festival and the Recital Gold Medal at the 1998 Calgary Competition. Between 2003 and 2005, he served as the Organist-in-Residence at the First Congregational Church in Los Angeles, which houses one of the world's largest church organs. From 2005 to 2022, he was the Organist at Eton College.

Goode has performed at major venues worldwide, including appearances at the BBC Proms, the Royal Festival Hall, and Symphony Hall. He has collaborated with the BBC National Orchestra of Wales, the BBC Singers, and trumpeter Alison Balsom. His performances have taken him across Europe, North America, Australia, and Asia.

As a composer, Goode has written various choral and organ works, including collaborations with poet Francis Warner. Notable compositions include the Blitz Requiem, premiered at St Paul's Cathedral in 2013, and Holy is the True Light, premiered in July 2022.

In 2021, Goode was suspended from his role at Eton after searching for indecent images of children on a work laptop on 229 separate occasions between March and December of that year. In 2024, he was banned from teaching in schools indefinitely by the Teaching Regulation Agency.

== Discography ==
Goode's notable recordings include:

- Johann Sebastian Bach: The Complete Organ Works, Signum Records
- A Parry Collection, Regent Records
- Bach from Freiberg Cathedral, Signum Records
- Max Reger: Complete Organ Works, Volume 1, Herald Records
- Max Reger: Organ Works, Volumes 2 and 3, Signum Records
- Orb and Sceptre, Herald Records
- Commotio, Herald Records
- The Organ of the Sheldonian Theatre, Oxford
- The Great Organs of First Church, Volume 2, Gothic Records
- Organs of Cambridge, Volume 3
- French Showpieces from King's

== Notable Performances and Recognition ==
Goode has been featured in high-profile events, including:

- The reopening concert of the Royal Festival Hall organ in 2014.
- Performance at the American Guild of Organists National Convention in 2016.
