= Richard Marlow =

English choral conductor and organist

- Born: 26 July 1939; Banstead, Surrey, England
- Died: 16 June 2013 (aged 73)
- Genres: Classical
- Occupations: Conductor, organist
- Instrument: Pipe organ
- Formerly of: Cambridge University Chamber Choir

Richard Kenneth Marlow (26 July 1939 – 16 June 2013) was an English choral conductor and organist.

== Early life ==
Born in Banstead, Surrey, Richard Marlow attended St Olave's and St Saviour's Grammar School in Southwark and was head chorister at Southwark Cathedral. He attained his FRCO at the age of 17 years and was an Organ Scholar and later Research Fellow of Selwyn College, Cambridge. Marlow studied with Thurston Dart, writing a doctoral dissertation on the 17th-century virginalist, Giles Farnaby.

== Career ==
Marlow then taught at Southampton University, and later returned to Cambridge in 1968, succeeding Raymond Leppard as Fellow and Director of Music at Trinity and taking up a lectureship in the University Music Faculty.

The following year Richard Marlow founded the Cambridge University Chamber Choir, which won critical acclaim worldwide for its enterprising and stylish performances. He disbanded this group in 1989 to devote more time to the recently formed (1982) mixed choir of Trinity College, whose many broadcasts, recordings and foreign tours have established its reputation internationally. One of his former proteges is comedian and presenter Alexander Armstrong, who was a choral scholar from 1989 to 1992.

In addition to his choral work and his teaching, Richard Marlow was active as an editor and contributed articles and reviews to various scholarly journals and books, including The New Grove Dictionary of Music and the Oxford Dictionary of National Biography. He also conducted, lectured and gave harpsichord and organ recitals in many European countries as well as in Australia, Brazil, Canada, Japan, New Zealand, South Africa, Taiwan and the US. As organ soloist and choir director, he recorded frequently, most recently Handel Organ Concerto No. 14 with the Academy of Ancient Music.

Marlow retired from his post as director of music at Trinity College, Cambridge, in September 2006 and was succeeded in the post by Stephen Layton. However, he remained a fellow of the college until his death on 16 June 2013.

Cultural offices
Preceded by Raymond Leppard	Organist and Master of the Choristers of Trinity College, Cambridge; 1968–2006	Succeeded by Stephen Layton
