= John Sanders (musician) =

English organist, conductor, choir trainer and composer

- Born: 23 November 1933
- Origin: England
- Died: 23 December 2003 (aged 70)

John Derek Sanders OBE, FRCO (23 November 1933 – 23 December 2003) was an English organist, conductor, choir trainer and composer. He was organist of Gloucester Cathedral from 1967 to 1994, and director of the Three Choirs Festival from 1968 to 1994.

== Education ==
Born in Wanstead, Essex, he attended Felsted School on a music scholarship, where he had his first organ lessons. In 1950 he began two years study at the Royal College of Music leading to his ARCM diploma. Here he was taught by Sir John Dykes Bower, the then organist at St Paul's Cathedral.

This was followed by a Bachelor of Music degree at the University of Cambridge where Sanders was an organ scholar at Gonville and Caius College and was influenced by Patrick Hadley. During this time he also gained his Fellowship of the Royal College of Organists.

== Early career ==
National Service in the Royal Artillery followed his graduation, but even here Sanders found opportunities for orchestral conducting.

On the completion of his National Service in 1958 he took up the appointment of Assistant Organist at Gloucester, a post which also included being director of music at The King's School, Gloucester. Here he met the third major musical influence on his life, Herbert Sumsion.

In 1963 he moved north, to Chester Cathedral, to take charge of the choir there. Whilst in Chester he met his wife, Janet, and had his first experience of running a music festival, the Chester Festival.

== Gloucester ==
1967 saw the retirement of Sumsion, and Sanders returned to Gloucester as organist, taking on as well the conductorships of the Gloucestershire Symphony Orchestra and Gloucester Choral Society. The following year saw him follow in Sumsion's footsteps once more, becoming director of music at Cheltenham Ladies' College.

As with the organists at Hereford and Worcester Cathedrals, the position at Gloucester brings the high-profile role of directing the Three Choirs Festival. The now annual Festival is hosted by each cathedral in turn, the local Organist directing the festival each year. Sanders time at Gloucester saw him direct nine Festivals, including that in 1977 which was marked the 250th Festival (the history of the festival can however be traced to 1715), as well as the Silver Jubilee of Elizabeth II. From 1975, the direction of the festival was helped by the fact that for almost 20 years the directors remained the same, with Sanders establishing a close working relationship with Roy Massey at Hereford and Donald Hunt at Worcester.

He became a Freeman of the City of London in 1986. In 1990 he served as President of the Cathedral Organists' Association, and the Archbishop of Canterbury, Robert Runcie, awarded him the Lambeth degree of Doctor of Music. 1991 saw him being made an Honorary Fellow of the Royal School of Church Music.

== Retirement ==
Sanders retired from Gloucester in 1994 and was appointed an Officer of the Order of the British Empire (OBE) in the Queen's Birthday Honours list that year. Following his retirement, Gloucester Cathedral granted him the title of Organist Emeritus.

Retirement gave Sanders more time to pursue composition (although he continued his work at Cheltenham until 1997). He also moved away from Gloucester – to Upton Bishop, near Ross-on-Wye – where he continued to play the organ in the parish church.

Late in 2003 the Guild of Church Musicians marked his contribution to church music in a special service at Westminster Cathedral. He was recovering from a hip operation in Hereford Hospital when he died of pneumonia on 23 December 2003.

== Musical compositions ==
Sanders's compositions include:

=== Choral ===
==== Liturgical ====
- Festival Te Deum (1962)
- Preces and responses (based on the Dresden Amen) (1983)
- Te Deum (1985)
- Jubilate Deo (1986)
- Two Prayers (1988)
- A Canticle of Joy SS + organ (1991)
- The Reproaches (Publication date 1993)
- St Mark Passion (Publication date 1993)
- The Firmament (2000) – for the choir of St Philip's Cathedral, Birmingham

==== Other ====
- Requiem
- Gloucester Visions cantata (1995)
- Urbs Beata cantata for brass, double choir and soloists (2001), Three Choirs commission

=== Organ ===
- Soliloquy (1977)
- Toccata (1979)

== Sources ==
Cultural offices
Preceded by James Middleton	Organist and Master of the Choristers of Chester Cathedral; 1964–1967	Succeeded by Roger Fisher
Preceded by Herbert Sumsion	Organist and Master of the Choristers of Gloucester Cathedral; 1967–1994	Succeeded by David Briggs
