= Peggy Hubicki =

Peggy Hubicki MBE
- Born: Margaret Mullins; 2 July 1915; Hampstead
- Died: 3 January 2006 (aged 90)
- Education: Royal Academy of Music
- Era: 20th century
- Spouse: Bohdan Hubicki
- Awards: gold medal of the Worshipful Company of Musicians

Margaret Olive Hubicki MBE (2 July 1915 – 3 January 2006) was an English composer and teacher of musical harmony, who invented the Colour-Staff method to help people with dyslexia to read music.

== Life ==
Hubicki was born Margaret Mullins in Hampstead, London on 2 July 1915. Her mother was Scottish and her father English. She studied piano and composition at the Royal Academy of Music with Benjamin Dale, winning the gold medal of the Worshipful Company of Musicians, and at her graduation recital in 1934 performed a sonata of her own composition.

At the Academy she met fellow-student Bohdan Hubicki, a Canadian violinist of Ukrainian descent, and they married in July 1940. Three months later Bohdan died when their house was bombed; Peggy sustained severe injuries. Thereafter she devoted much of her life to music education. She did not remarry.

Hubicki devised the Colour Staff method to help people with dyslexia to read music by using colour. "Its particularly distinctive characteristic is that it enables musical notation to be taught in a multi-sensory way". She was one of the founders of the British Dyslexia Association, and involved in the Council for Music in Hospitals.

Hubicki was Professor of Harmony at the Royal Academy of Music until she retired in 1986; her students included composer Sir John Tavener, flautist James Galway, pianist Jeremy Menuhin and singer Annie Lennox. She was also one of the first teachers, and a governor, of the Yehudi Menuhin School.

She was appointed MBE in December 1986 in recognition of her service to music in hospitals.

An album of her compositions, Dedication in Time, was released on the Chandos label in 2005 to celebrate her 90th birthday.
