= Roger Fisher (organist) =

English concert organist and pianist (1936–2021)

Roger Fisher (18 September 1936 – 3 June 2021) was an English concert organist and pianist from Woodford, Essex, England.

== Biography ==
He attended Bancroft's School and went on to the Royal College of Music, studying with Herbert Howells and Harold Darke. He gained ARCM, FRCO and CHM diplomas, and also won the Geoffrey Tankard Prize for Organ playing. He went on to Christ Church, Oxford, having gained an organ scholarship.

Fisher lived in Hereford and was the Assistant Organist at Hereford Cathedral and Assistant Lecturer in Music at the College of Education. In 1967, he became Organist and Master of the Choristers at Chester Cathedral. In 1970, he started recording for occasional BBC broadcasts and record labels such as EMI, Decca and RCA. He retired from the Cathedral in 1996 and moved to live in Wales.

Fisher died on 3 June 2021.

== Recordings ==
- Jubilate Deo - Music for Men's Voices (The Lay Clerks of Chester Cathedral)
- Roger Fisher at Wells Cathedral (Copeman Hart)
- Roger Fisher Plays French Organ Music
- Edwin H Lemare Symphony No 1 and Other Romantic Rarities
- Organ Music from Chichester Cathedral
- A Celebration of Organ Music from Hull City Hall
- English Organ Music from Hull City Hall
- Roger Fisher plays the Cavaillé-Coll Organ in the Parr Hall, Warrington (2 recordings)
- Ystym Colwyn Hall
- Whitlock Organ Music
- The Land of the Mountain and the Flood
- Harold Darke - Organ Works
- Organ Music from the Parish Church of St Laurence, Ludlow
- Walford Davies
- Klassik & Romantik
- Early Twentieth Century German Organ Music
- Twentieth Century British Organ Music
- Romantic Masterpieces for Organ
- The Romantic Organ - Chester Cathedral
- Music at the Old Chapel
- Organ Showcase from Hull City Hall (Volume 2) - Music by J S Bach & Louis Vierne
- Organ Showcase from Hull City Hall (Volume 4) - Music by Dupré, Franck & Widor
- Organ Centenary: Pietermaritzburg City Hall

Cultural offices
Preceded by John Sanders	Organist and Master of the Choristers of Chester Cathedral; 1967–1997	Succeeded by David Poulter
