= King's School, Chester =

Private school in Chester, Cheshire, England

Coordinates: 53.167°N 2.900°W

The King's School, Chester

Location
- Wrexham Road; Chester, Cheshire, CH4 7QL; England

Information
- Type: Private day school Cathedral school
- Motto: Rex dedit, benedicat Deus (The King gave it, may God bless it)
- Religious affiliation: Church of England
- Established: 1541; 485 years ago
- Founder: King Henry VIII
- Local authority: Cheshire West and Chester
- Department for Education URN: 111485 Tables
- Chairman of the Governors: E. M. Johnson
- Headmaster: Luke Rogers
- Gender: Co-educational
- Age: 4 to 18
- Enrolment: 1,045 (approx.)
- Houses: 8
- Colours: Green, blue and white, red
- Former pupils: Old King's Scholars
- Affiliation: HMC
- Rowing club: The King's School Rowing Club
- Website: http://www.kingschester.co.uk/

The King's School, Chester, is a co-educational private day school for pupils aged 4 to 18. It is one of the seven 'King's Schools' established (or re-endowed and renamed) by King Henry VIII in 1541 after the Dissolution of the Monasteries.

It is situated outside the city of Chester, England. The school is a member of the Headmasters' and Headmistresses' Conference. The school comprises an Infant school (years 4–7), a Junior school (years 7–11), a Senior school (years 11–16) and a Sixth form (years 16–18) in which the students choose their A-level subjects.

== History ==
An ancient foundation, attached to a monastery that King Henry VIII had dissolved, it still served a purpose teaching grammar to potential ordinands. It was reconstituted in 1541 as a joint church state enterprise and operated for 400 years in the former monks' refectory. The statutes that constituted the school also specified the training and education of choristers for Chester Cathedral, an arrangement that ran in parallel for hundreds of years. It was one of seven schools in this category, the others being Canterbury, Rochester, Peterborough, Worcester, Gloucester, and Ely. In 1869 new school buildings were constructed and they were formally opened by Gladstone. The school motto is "Rex dedit, benedicat Deus” (The King gave it, may God bless it), which was given by John Saul Howson, Dean of Chester. John Saul Howson was the chief instrument in the building and endowing of the King's School, and in its reorganization on a broader basis.

== Description ==
Since 1960, the King's School has been based at its Wrexham Road site on the outskirts of Chester. It has a Sixth Form Centre, a library (the Wickson Library), a theatre (the Vanbrugh Theatre), and a music school (the Tim Turvey Music School). Sports facilities include a swimming pool, all-weather sports pitches, grass sports pitches, a cricket pavilion, and a boat house on the River Dee.

=== Academia ===
In September 2011, King's adopted a new curriculum alongside its shift from an eight-period to a five-period day. This involved substantial changes, introducing 'enrichment' lessons and replacing the GCSE courses with IGCSE.

==== Junior school curriculum ====
The Junior School provides a broad curriculum designed to develop pupils' knowledge, skills and independence through a balanced programme of academic and practical learning. Pupils study English, mathematics, science, history, geography, technology, computing, art, music, modern languages, physical education, games, religious studies, personal, social and health education (PSHE) and guided reading, alongside a programme of activities. The curriculum is supported by educational visits, workshops, music and drama opportunities, residential courses and optional overseas trips. Teaching aims to develop literacy, numeracy, enquiry and problem-solving skills while providing appropriate support for pupils with special educational needs and additional challenge for more able learners.

==== Senior school curriculum ====
The Senior School follows a broad academic curriculum designed to provide a balanced education while allowing increasing subject specialisation as pupils progress through the school. In Years 7–9, pupils study a wide range of subjects including English, mathematics, sciences, humanities, modern foreign languages, computing, creative arts, physical education and personal, social and health education (PSHE). GCSE study begins in Year 10, with English, English Literature and mathematics compulsory, alongside science, at least one modern foreign language (subject to individual needs), and a range of optional subjects. In the Sixth Form, most students initially study four A Levels before specialising in three in their final year. The curriculum is supported by careers education, PSHE, enrichment opportunities and the option to complete the Extended Project Qualification (EPQ).

==== Senior school results ====
In 2025, 84% of all GCSE grades were at grade 7-9 (A/A* equivalent), with 66% of all grades at grade 9/8, and 96% at grade 6-9 (A*-B). In 2025, 25% of all A-Level grades were A*, 60% were A*/A, 85% A*-B

=== Extra-curricular activities ===
The school's pupils engage the Duke of Edinburgh's Award scheme. The King's School's Combined Cadet Force (CCF) is a voluntary contingent within the CCF. It consists of the mandatory Army Section, with an additional RAF Section. The King's School has also been successful in the F1 in Schools competition, sending a team to the global finals in 2016. In July 2004 Head of Maths Mr Barry Lewis was involved in North Wales Police's Operation Sadir due to images found on his school computer

=== Publications ===
The Herald is the school's magazine and was published on a termly basis for parents and pupils. Its articles are about current pupils, teachers and former pupils. It was shut down.

== Sports ==
=== Hockey ===
In 2011, King's appointed hockey coach Simon Egerton, who is a member of the England hockey team.

=== Rowing ===
The King's School Rowing Club has been in existence since 1883 with the school's boat house situated on the River Dee in the centre of Chester and is affiliated to British Rowing. Rowing is offered as part of the sports curriculum from the third year onwards.

The King's rowers often compete in the top levels of school's competitions, and count numerous ex-Boat-Race crew members alongside National and Olympic squad members amongst it Old King's Scholars Alumni including seven Olympians, three in the London 2012 games. Gold and silver medallists – two gold and one silver Olympic medallists. Olympic Finalists – three in 2012. 14 x Oxford and Cambridge Blues. 47 x GB Senior World Championship representatives – since 1960 and 36 x GB Junior International representatives – since 1970.

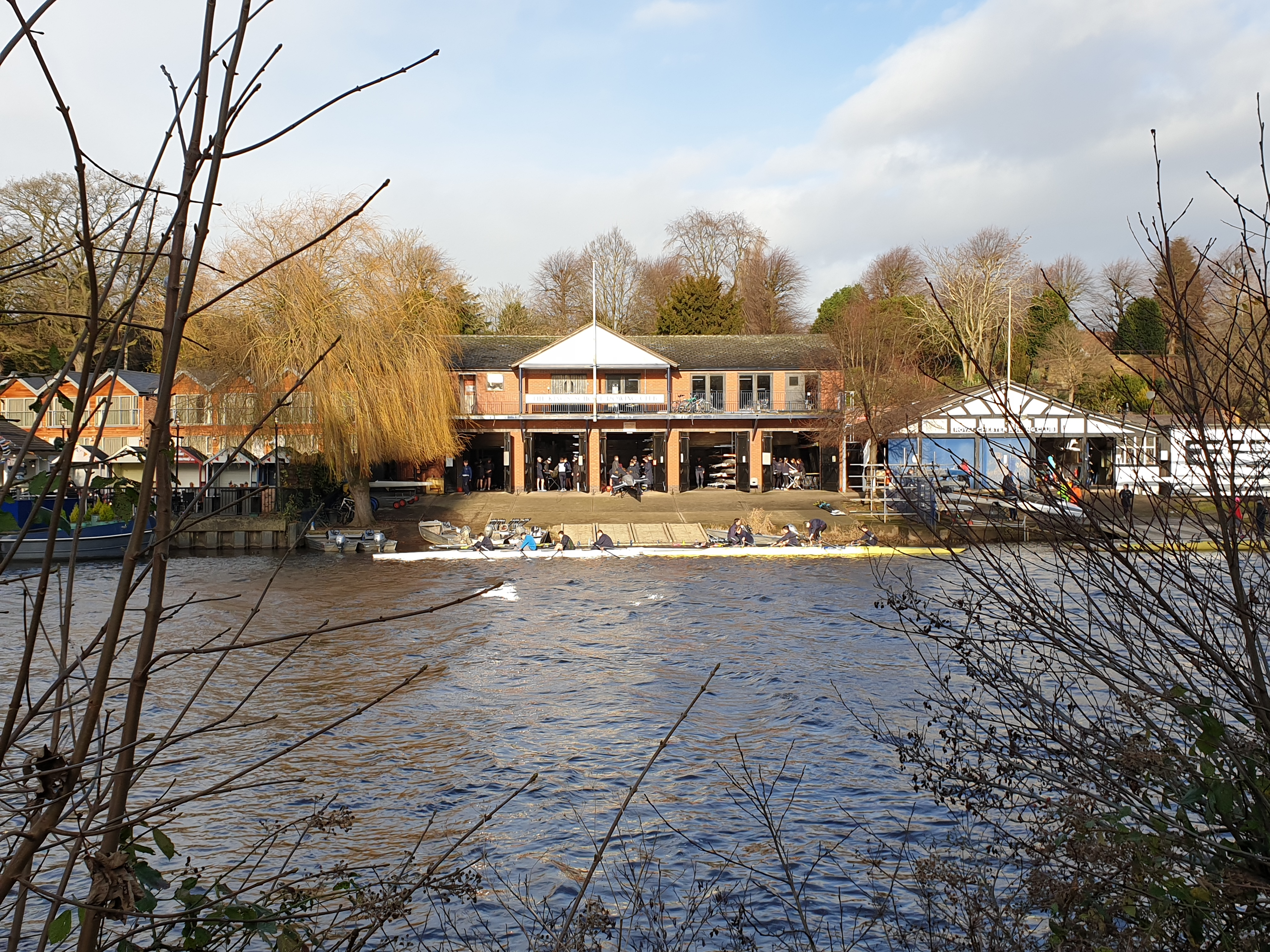
Kings Chester Boat House 2019

== Headmaster ==
The school's headmaster (since 2026) is Luke Rogers.

=== Previous headmasters ===
- 1981–2000 - Roger Wickson, historian
- 2000-2007 - Tim Turvey, biologist
- 2007-2017 - Chris Ramsey, MFL teacher
- 2017-2026 - George Hartley, geographer

A full list of previous headmasters are engraved on a board displayed in the school.

== Notable alumni ==
=== Post-1900 ===
- Godfrey Ashby, former bishop of St John's, South Africa
- Michael Axworthy
- Hagan Bayley, scientist and head of chemical biology at the University of Oxford
- Graham Benton, British and world indoor rowing champion
- Michael Burdekin, civil engineer and emeritus professor of the University of Manchester
- John Carroll, mathematician, physicist and former professor of natural philosophy at the University of Aberdeen
- Matthew Collins (academic), archaeologist
- Rob Leslie-Carter, engineer
- Sir James Dutton, former commandant-general, Royal Marines
- Rob Eastaway, mathematician and ex-puzzle writer for New Scientist
- Simon Edge, novelist
- James Fair, England and Great Britain hockey goalkeeper
- Nickolas Grace, actor
- George Guest, organist and choirmaster at St John's College, Cambridge
- Matthew Hancock, former secretary of state for digital, culture, media and sport (2018), secretary of state for health and social care (2018–21) and member of Parliament for West Suffolk
- Phillip Hallam-Baker, computer scientist, mostly known for his contributions to Internet security
- Tom James, Olympic gold medal oarsman
- Glyn Smallwood Jones, colonial administrator and last governor of Nyasaland
- Trevor Kletz, safety engineer and author on industrial safety
- Steve Leonard, television vet and BBC presenter
- Martin Lewis, financial journalist and founder of the MoneySavingExpert.com consumer finance website
- Hugh Lloyd, comedy actor
- Patrick Mercer, member of Parliament for Newark
- Seb Morris, racing driver
- Mike Parry, journalist and radio presenter
- Ronald Pickup, actor
- Jonathan Samuels, Journalist with Sky News
- Robin Spencer, former judge of the High Court of England and Wales
- George Drewry Squibb, lawyer
- David Whitley, author of The Midnight Charter
- Olivia Whitlam, Olympic rower
- Arnold Frederic Wilkins, radar pioneer
- Phil Salt, England Cricketer
- Kate Coppack, Welsh Cricketer
- Harry Brightmore, Olympic Gold medal coxswain

=== Pre-1900 ===
- Randle Ayrton, film and stage actor, producer and director
- John Bradbury, 1st Baron Bradbury, civil servant and chief economic advisor to the government during World War I
- Thomas Brassey, civil engineer
- Edward Brerewood, mathematician, logician and antiquary
- Charles Burney, music historian, musician, composer and philosopher
- John Byrom, poet and developer of geometric shorthand
- Randolph Caldecott, illustrator
- William Chaderton, academic, clergyman and former Regius Professor of Divinity at the University of Cambridge
- John Churton Collins, literary critic and former professor of English literature at the University of Birmingham
- Piers Claughton, clergyman and former archdeacon of London
- Thomas Legh Claughton, first bishop of St Albans and former Oxford Professor of Poetry
- George Cotton, clergyman and educator, known for establishing schools in British India
- Sir Peter Denis, 1st Baronet, naval officer and member of Parliament
- John Downham, clergyman and theologian
- Joseph Everett Dutton, pathologist, physician and tropical medicine specialist
- Thomas Falconer, clergyman and classical scholar
- Thomas Francis, physician, former president of the Royal College of Physicians and former Regius Professor of Medicine at the University of Oxford
- Christopher Goodman, clergyman and writer
- William Lee Hankey, painter and illustrator
- Rowland Hill, 1st Viscount Hill, former member of Parliament for Shrewsbury and Commander-in-Chief of the Forces
- George Lloyd, clergyman
- Bert Lipsham, England international footballer and FA Cup winner with Sheffield United in 1902.
- George Ormerod, antiquary and historian
- William Parry, Elizabethan courtier, MP and spy, executed 1585.
- Sir Ralph Champneys Williams, colonial governor of the British Windward Islands and Newfoundland and Labrador
- Thomas Wilson, clergyman

The Chester Association of Old King's Scholars (CAOKS), founded in 1866, exists to maintain links between former students. It is one of the longest established alumni associations in the country. The school has recently established OAKS (Organization of Alumni of The King's School) to maintain relations with former pupils. OAKS is free to join and open to all alumni.

== See also ==
- List of English and Welsh endowed schools (19th century)
- Chester Cathedral Choir School
