= The Children of the Lost =

2010 novel by David Whitley

- Author: David Whitley
- Cover artist: Tomislav Tomic
- Language: English
- Series: Agora Trilogy
- Genre: Fantasy
- Publisher: Puffin
- Publication date: 2010
- Publication place: United Kingdom
- Media type: Print paperback
- Pages: 416
- ISBN: 0-14-133012-0
- Preceded by: The Midnight Charter
- Followed by: The Canticle of Whispers

The Children of the Lost is a 2010 young adult fantasy novel by British author David Whitley. It is the sequel to his debut novel, The Midnight Charter. It continues Mark and Lilly's journey after they are banished from Agora in the first book.

== Concept ==
The book is set in a fantasy world called Agora, which is governed by an extreme form of capitalism. Anything can be bought and sold- including thoughts, ideas, emotions and ultimately people. Children are traded by their parents, and even on their twelfth birthday they are allowed to become traders themselves.

There is no money in Agora. Instead, people are ranked according to their reputation. It only takes a small rumour or wrongdoing to send even the most powerful merchant down to the bottom, where they normally become "debtors". With nothing left to trade, they are stuck at the bottom, with no means to climb back up the social hierarchy.

Agora is surrounded by walls. Nobody can enter the city, and nobody leave the city. The city itself is split into twelve districts, all named after Zodiac signs. The Director of Receipts watches over the city, and his Receivers police it.

== Characters ==
- Mark: a fourteen-year-old boy who replaced Count Stelli as Agora's greatest astrologer.
- Lily: a fourteen-year-old girl who began the almshouse.
- Dr Theophilus: nephew of Count Stelli. Works as a doctor. Helps Lily run the almshouse.
- Count Stelli: an old astrologist. He is Agora's greatest astrologist.
- Mr Snutworth: Mark's manservant
- Director of Receipts: Highest authority in Agora

== See also ==
- The Canticle of Whispers
