= David Whitley (writer) =

British writer (born 1984)

- Born: 1984 (age 41–42); Chester, England
- Occupation: Novelist
- Writing career
- Period: 2009-2013
- Genre: Fantasy
- Notable work: Agora Trilogy
- Website: www.davidwhitley.co.uk

David Whitley (born 1984) is a British writer, author of the young adult/teen fantasy The Midnight Charter and two subsequent books in the Agora Trilogy. The Midnight Charter was published in August 2009 and was Whitley's debut novel.

Whitley was born in Chester in the North West of England, where he was a pupil at The King's School. At the age of 17, he entered his first novel for the Kathleen Fiddler Award and was shortlisted. Still studying for an English degree at Oxford University, he submitted a children's story for the Cheshire Prize for Literature and, at 20, became its youngest ever winner.

== Method of writing ==
Whitley claims he is an obsessive planner, stating that he has "at least ten pages of notes" before he starts, including a plot outline, description of characters and a chapter-by-chapter break down of the book. This means he has a direction, and allows him to invent details and sometimes entirely new characters as he goes along, knowing full well that they will not obstruct the over-all structure of the book.

== Bibliography ==
=== Agora trilogy ===
- The Midnight Charter (2009)
- The Children of the Lost (2010)
- The Canticle of Whispers (2013)
