= Boathouse =

Building for storage of boats

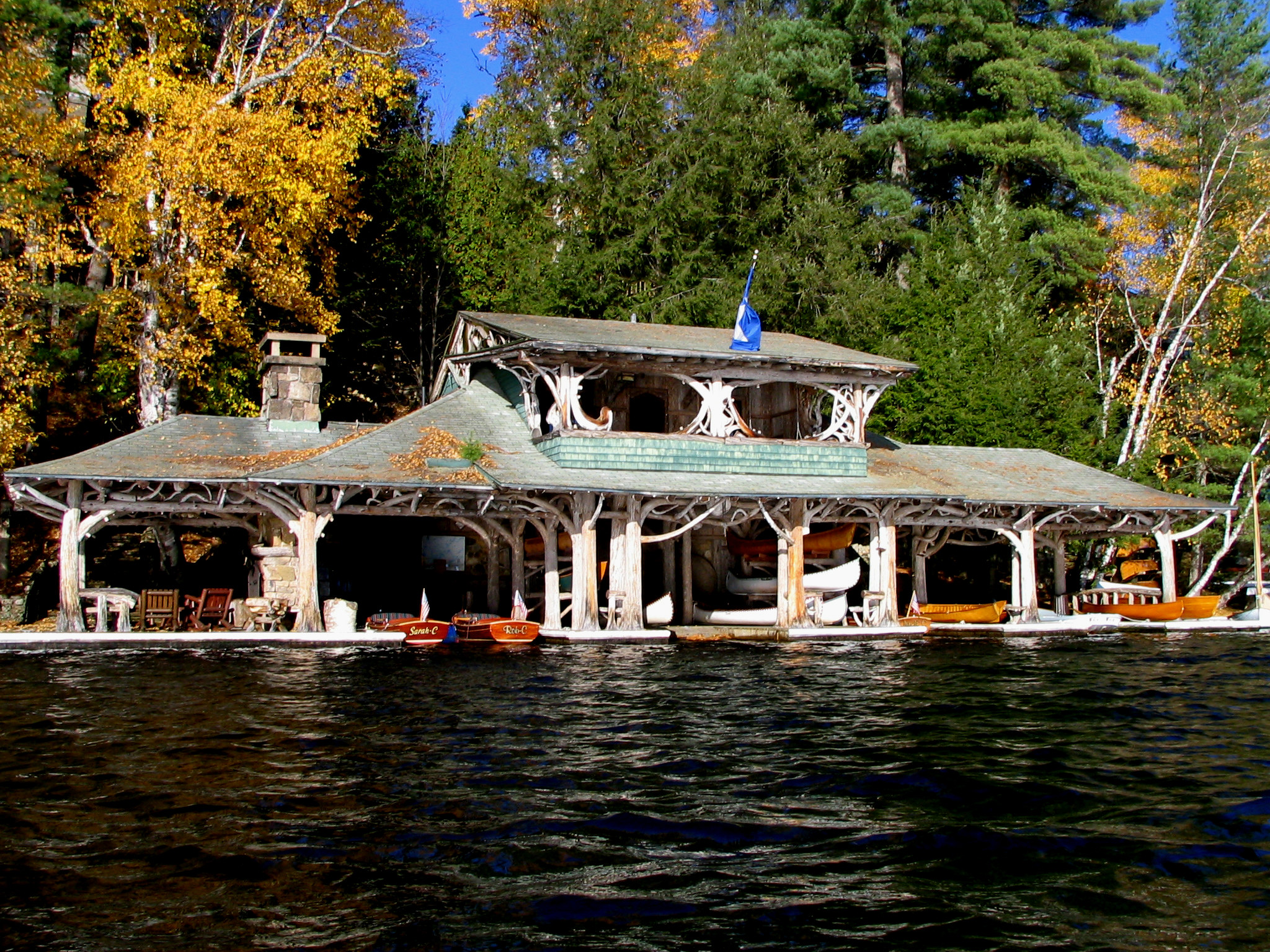
Camp Topridge boathouse, Adirondacks, USA

A boathouse (or a boat house) is a building especially designed for the storage of boats, normally smaller craft for sports or leisure use. These are typically located on open water, such as on a river. Often the boats stored are rowing boats. Other boats such as punts or small motor boats may also be stored.

A boathouse may be the headquarters of a boat club or rowing club and used to store racing shells, in which case it may be known as a shell house.

Boat houses may also include a restaurant, bar, or other leisure facilities, perhaps for members of an associated club. They are also sometimes modified to include living quarters for people, or the whole structure may be used as temporary or permanent housing.

In Scandinavia, the boathouse is known as a naust, a word deriving from Old Norse naverstað. These were typically built with stone walls and timber roofs and would be either open to the sea or provided with sturdy doors. The floors would be a simple continuation of the beach sand or rock, or they might be dug down to permit a boat to sail into the boathouse. The boathouse is also seen on riversides or lake sides.

== Gallery ==
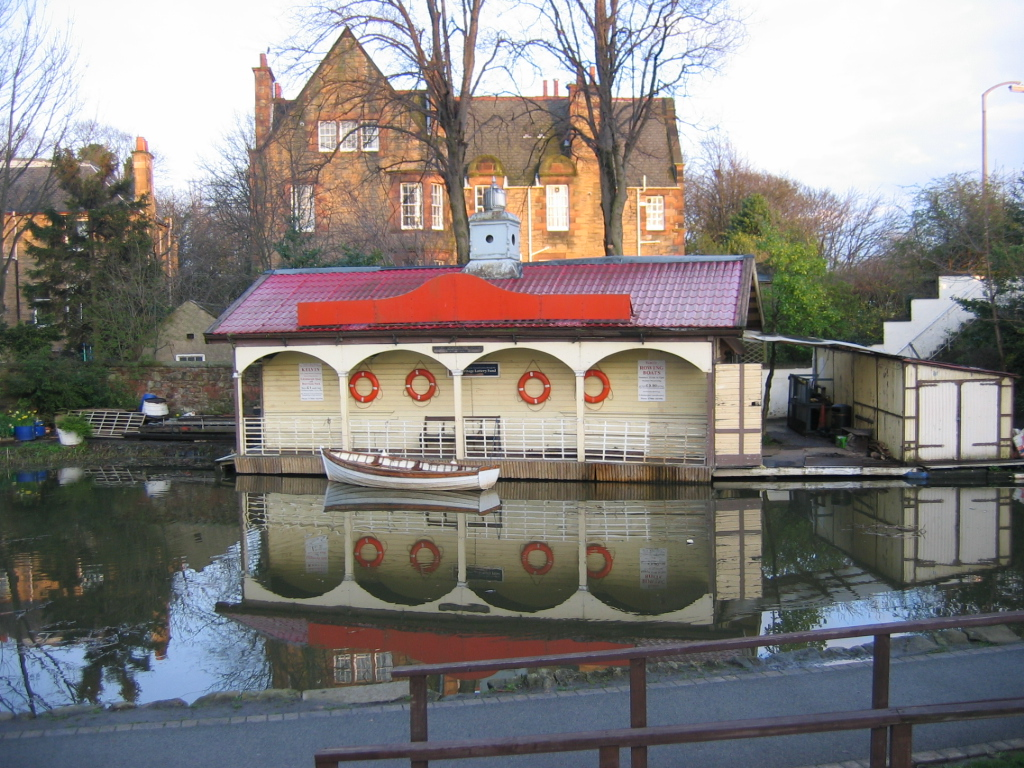
Edinburgh Canal Society boathouse on the Union Canal

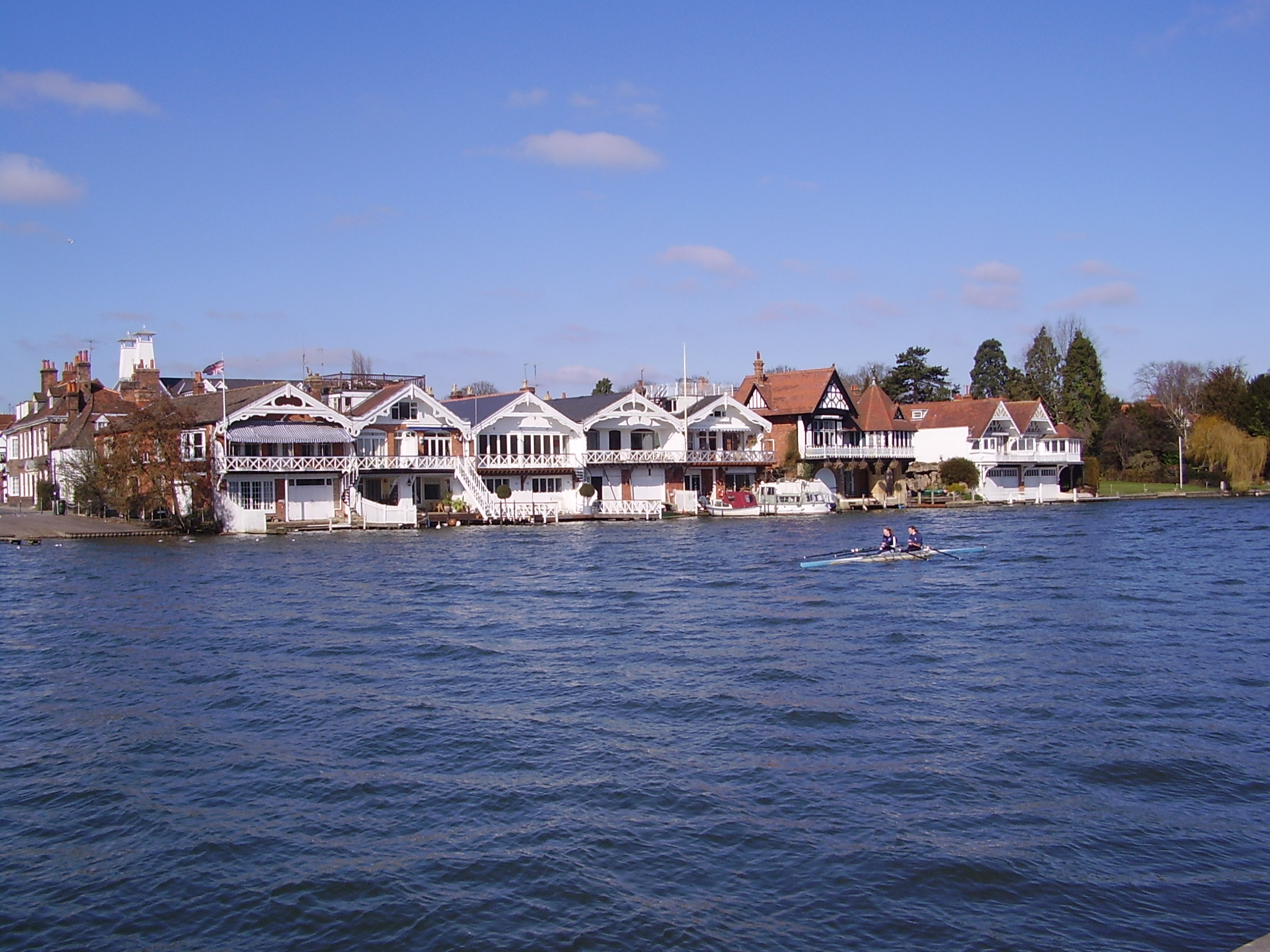
Boathouses on the River Thames at Henley-on-Thames, England

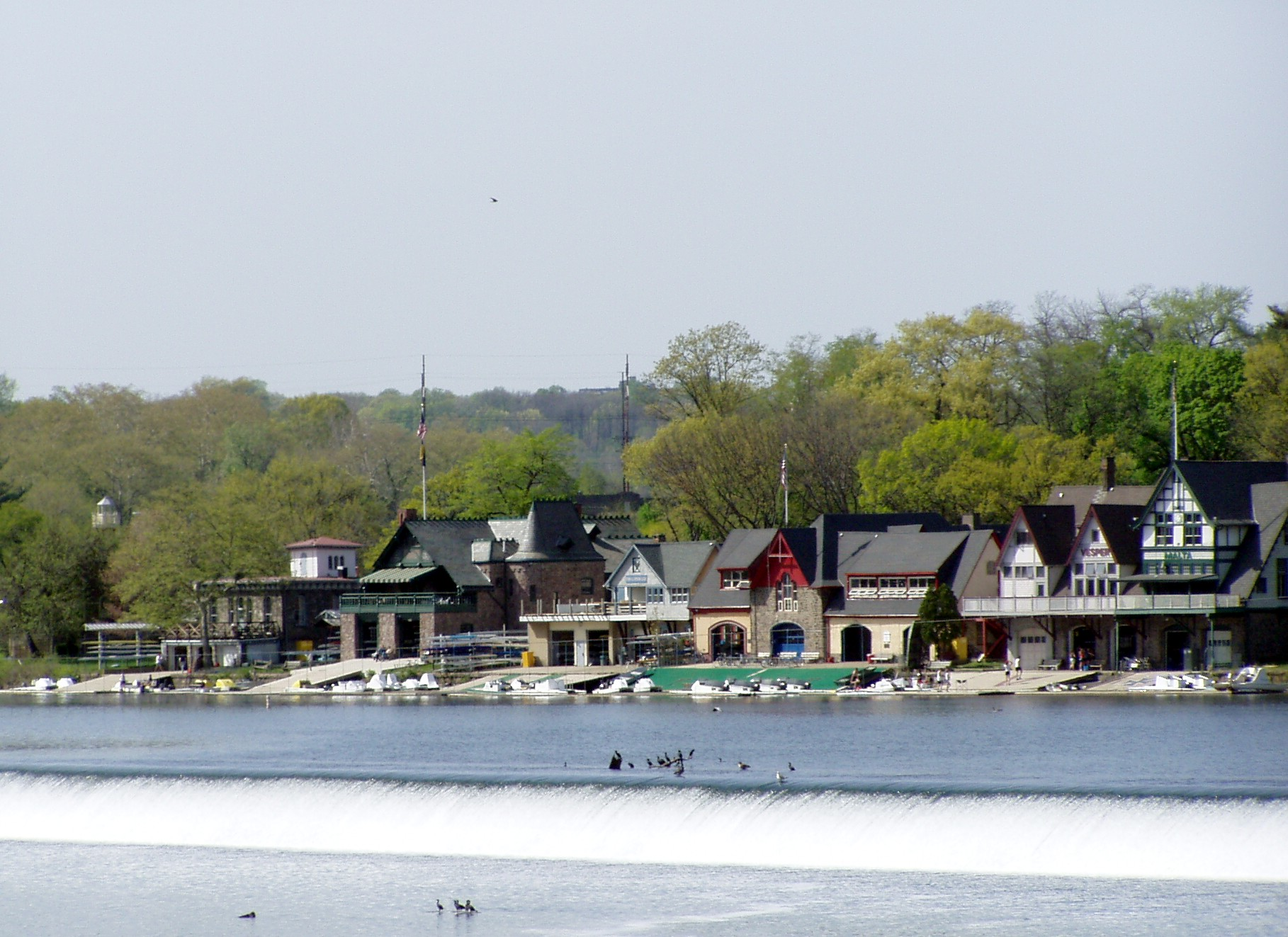
Boathouse Row on the Schuylkill River in Philadelphia, United States

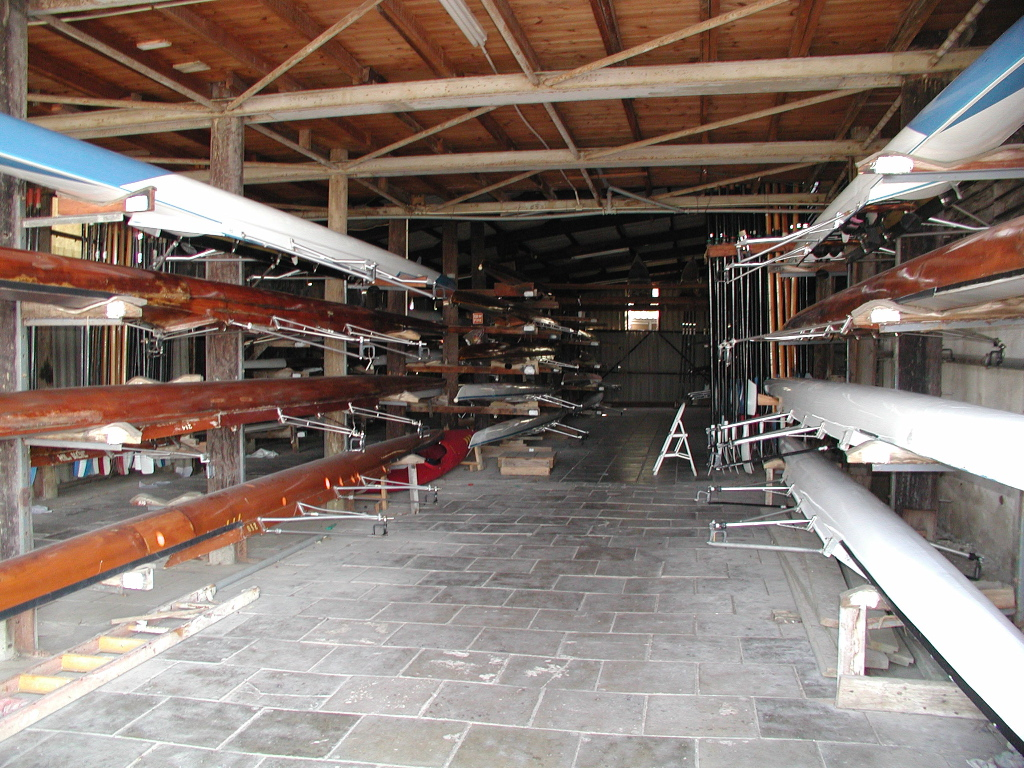
Racing shells stored inside a boathouse in Israel

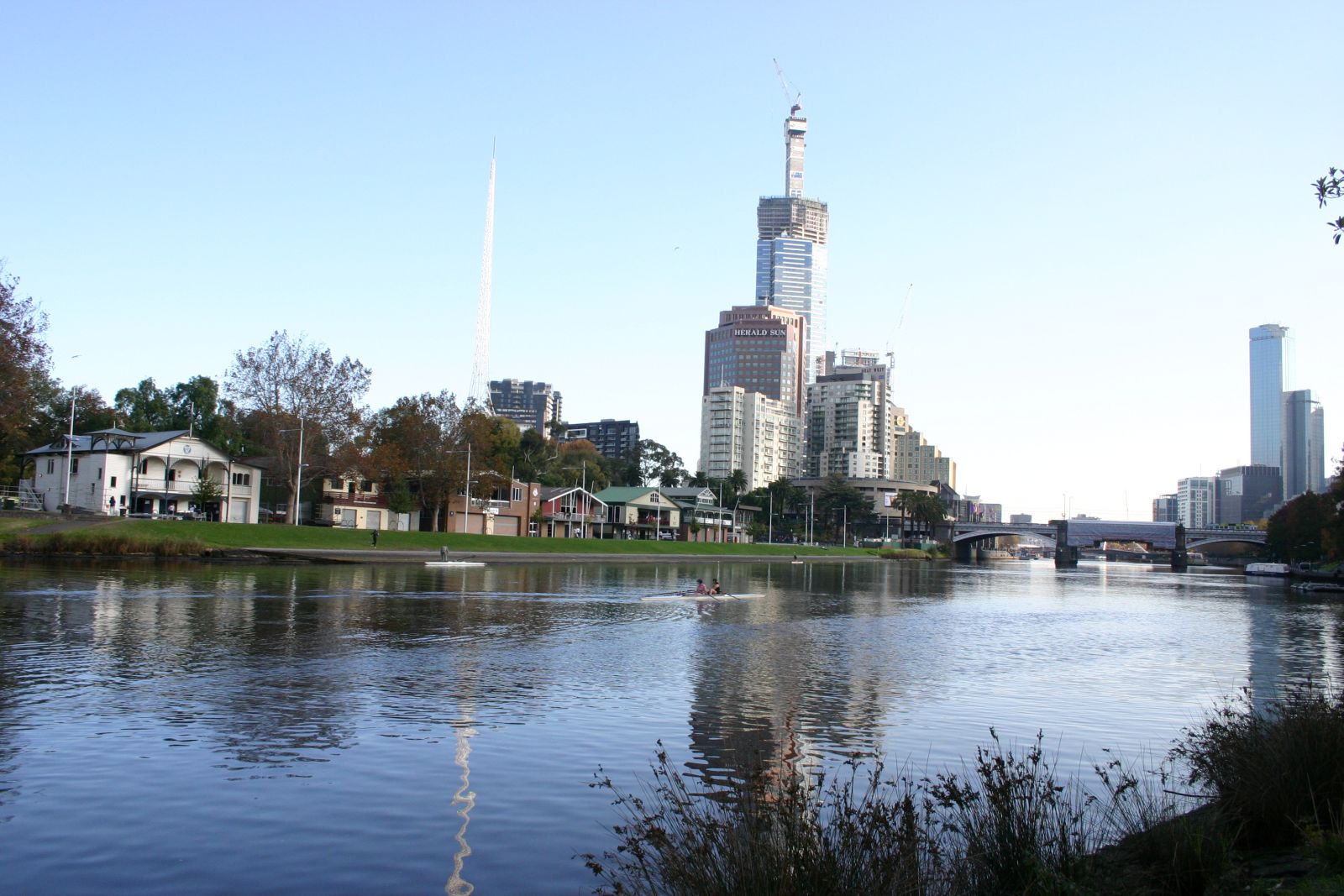
Boathouses on the Yarra River in Alexandra Gardens, Melbourne, Australia

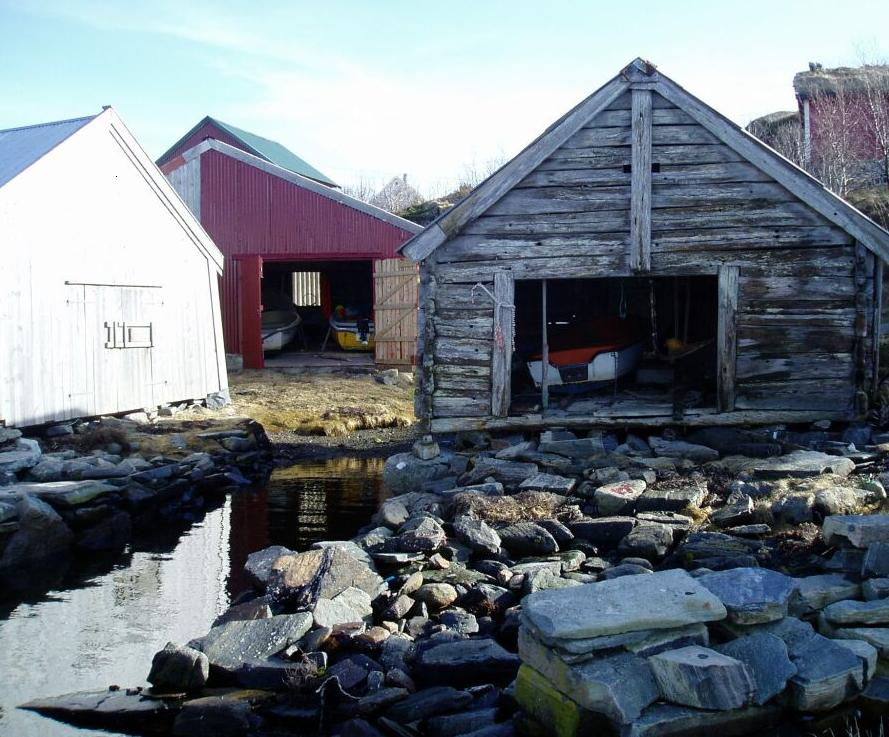
Boathouses in western Norway

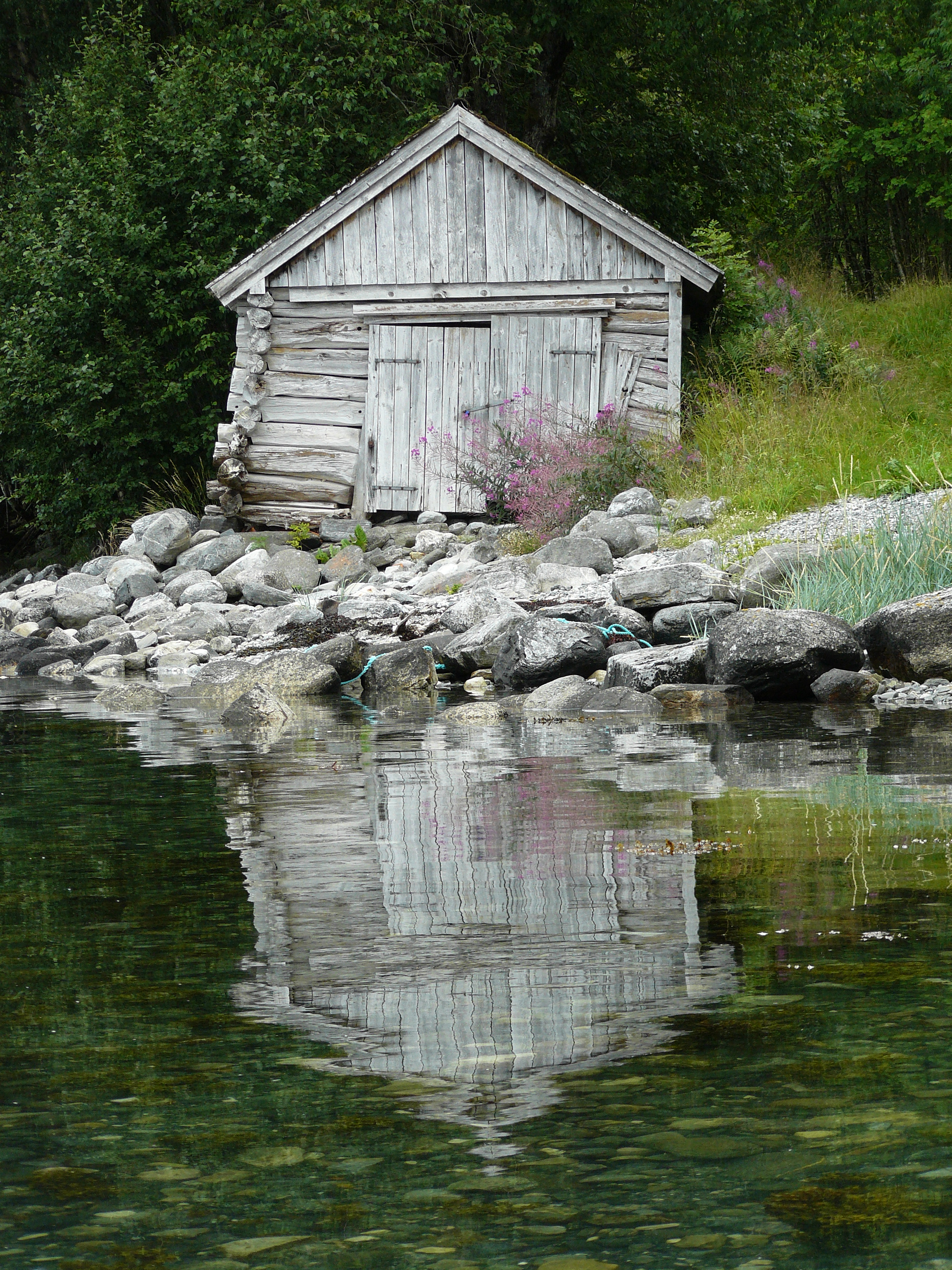
Log boathouse by Nordfjord

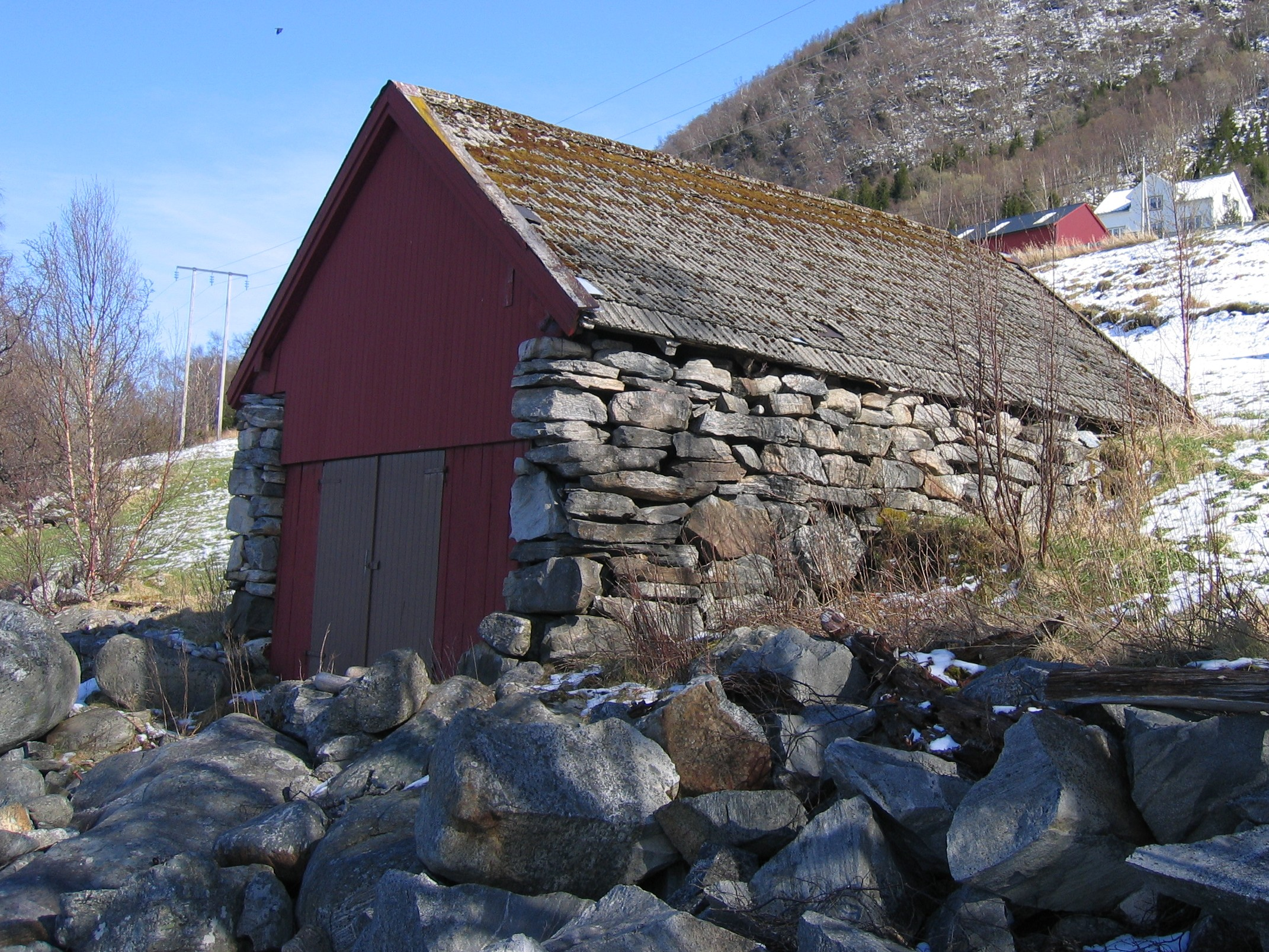
Stone-walled Norwegian boathouse set into a hillside

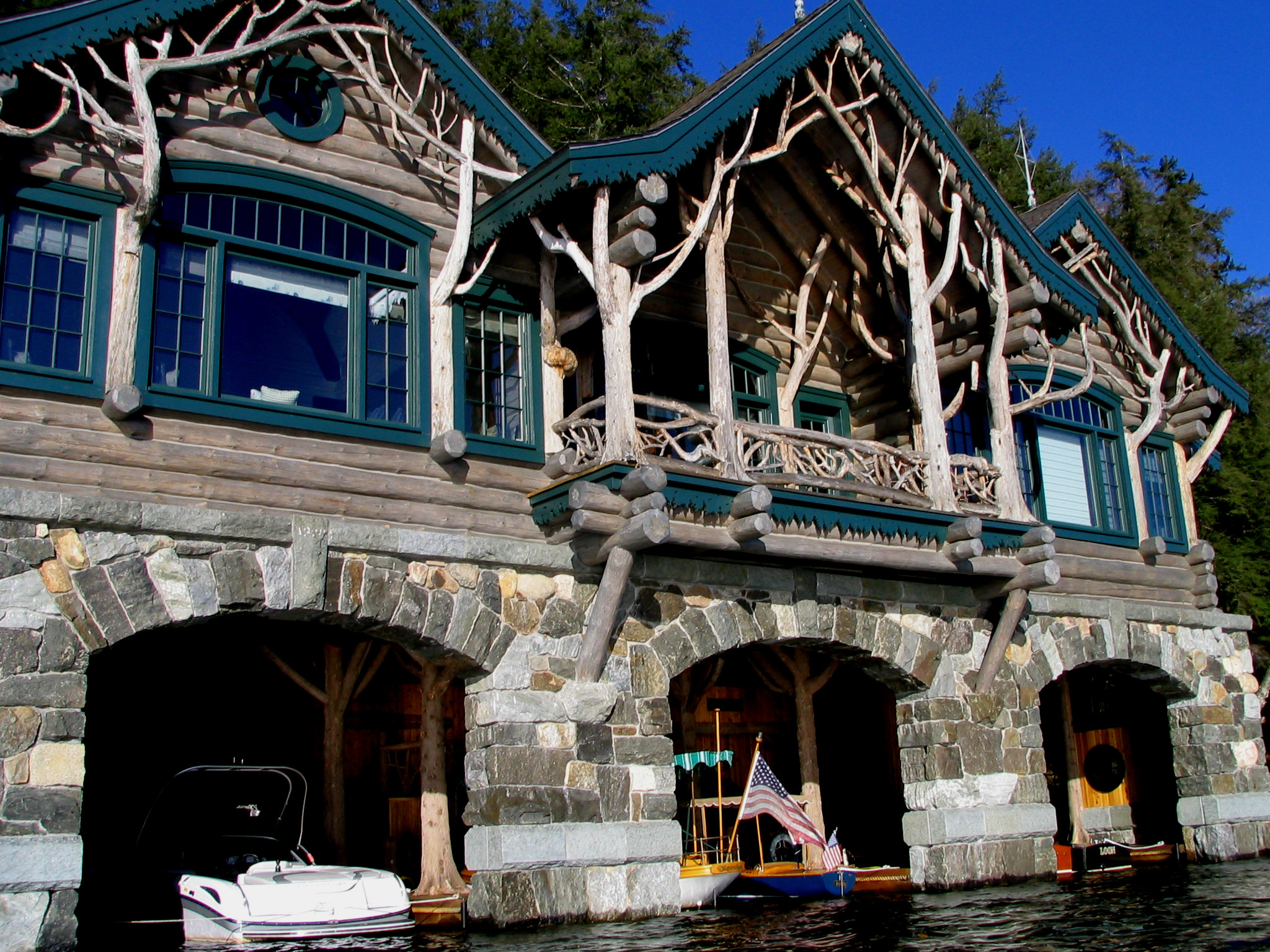
Closeup of the second boathouse at Topridge

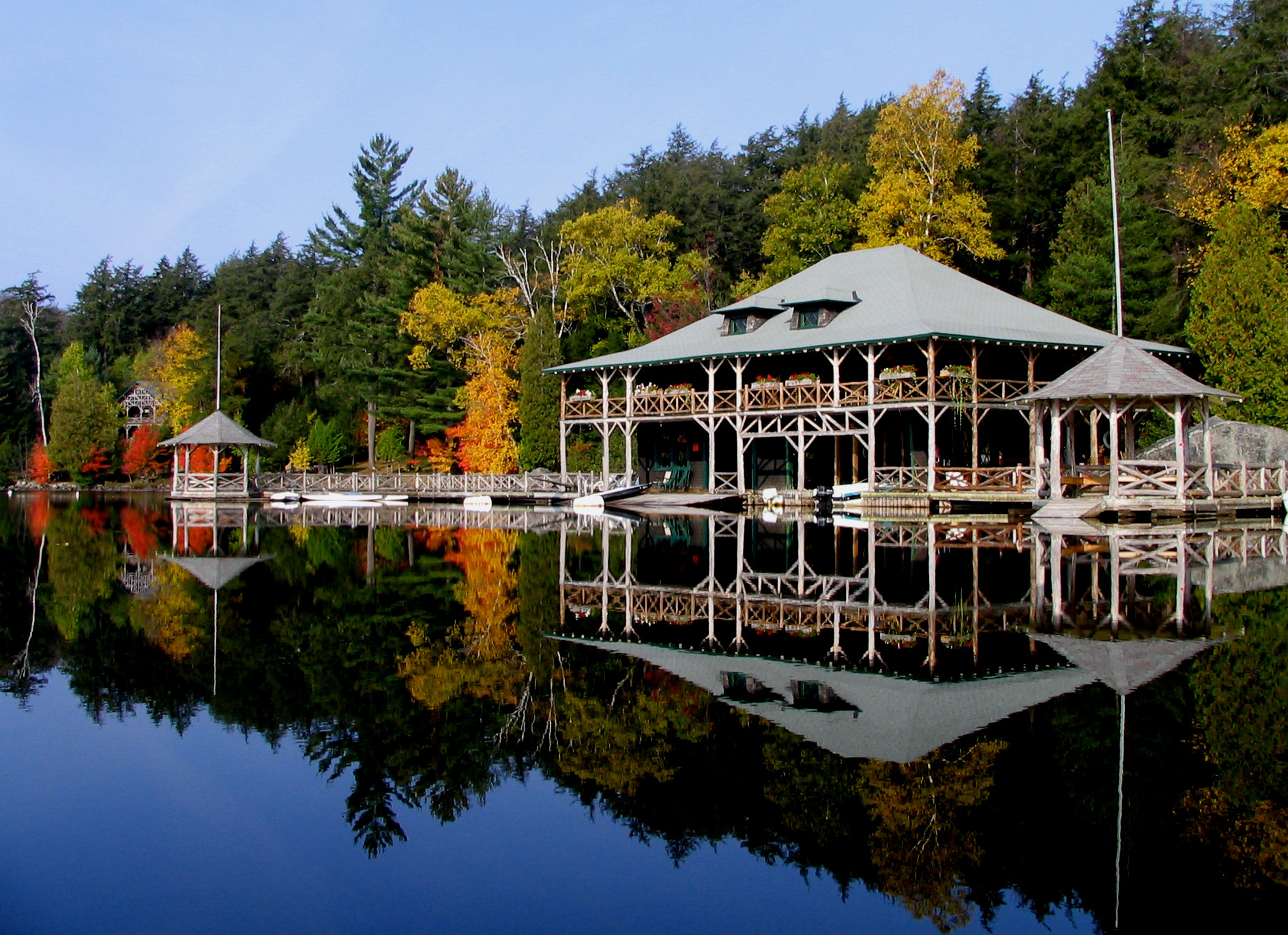
Knollwood Club boathouse on Lower Saranac Lake in the United States

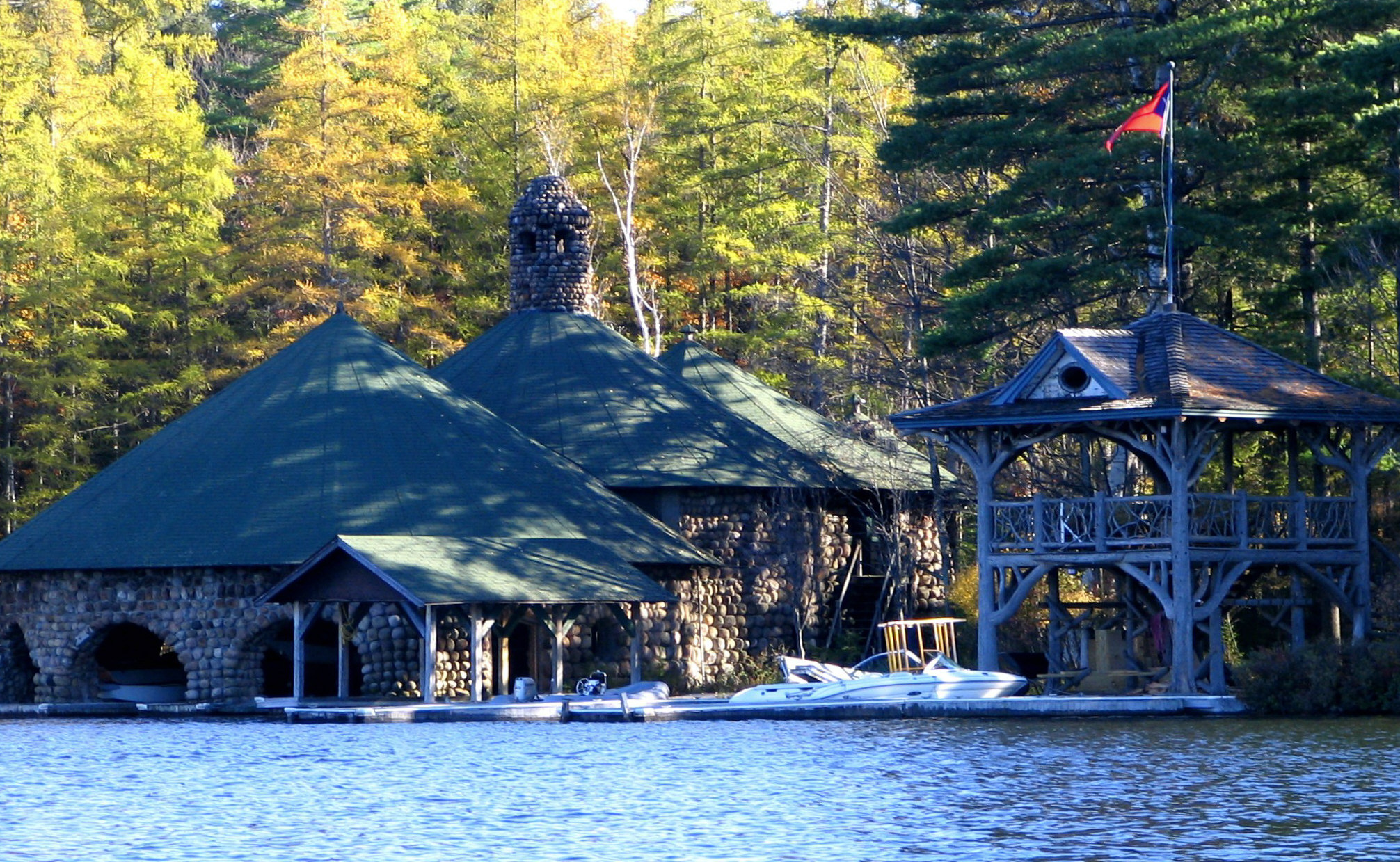
Stone boathouse at Camp Katia on Upper St. Regis Lake, United States

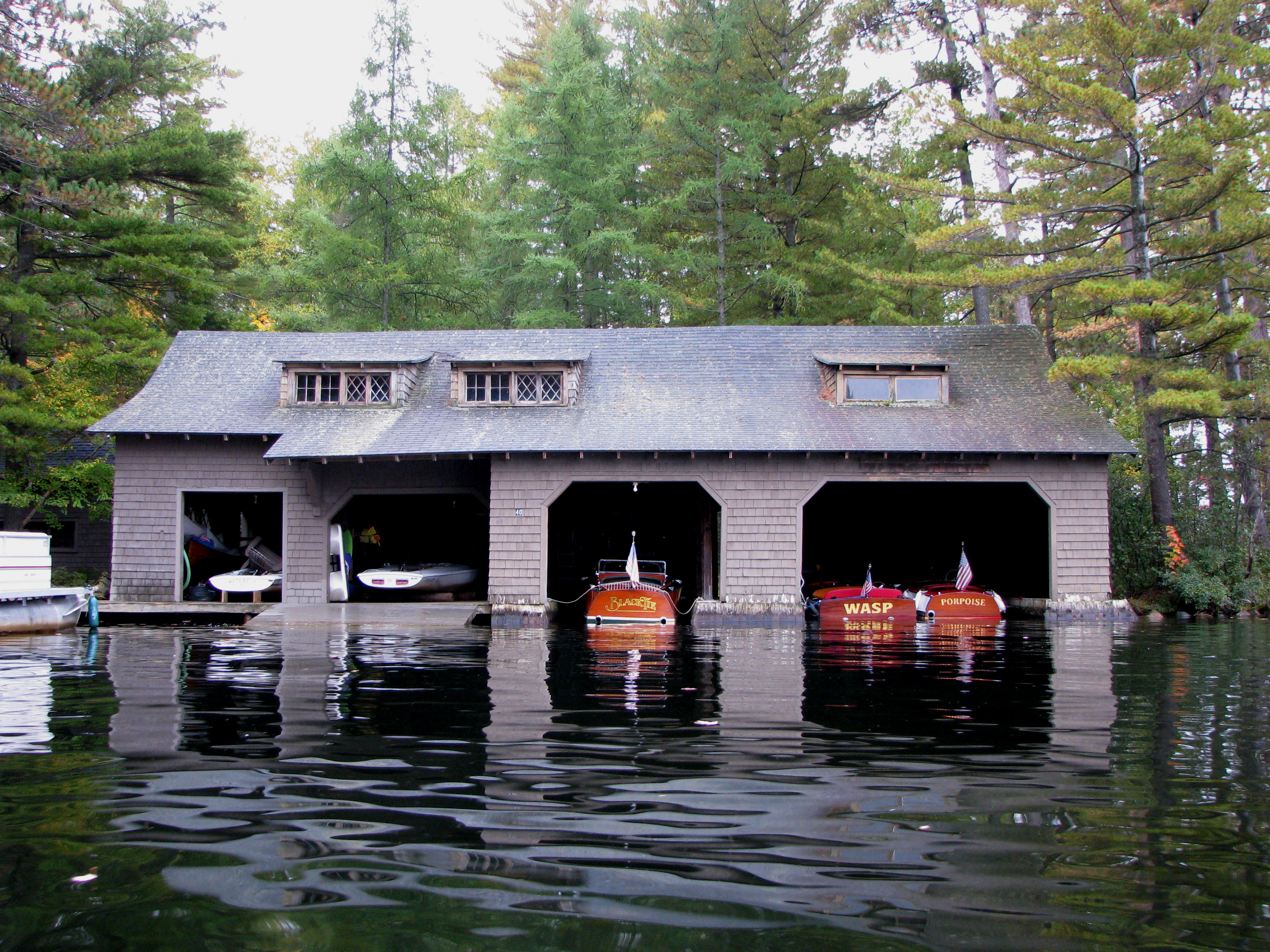
Boathouse at Camp Wild Air, Upper St. Regis Lake, United States

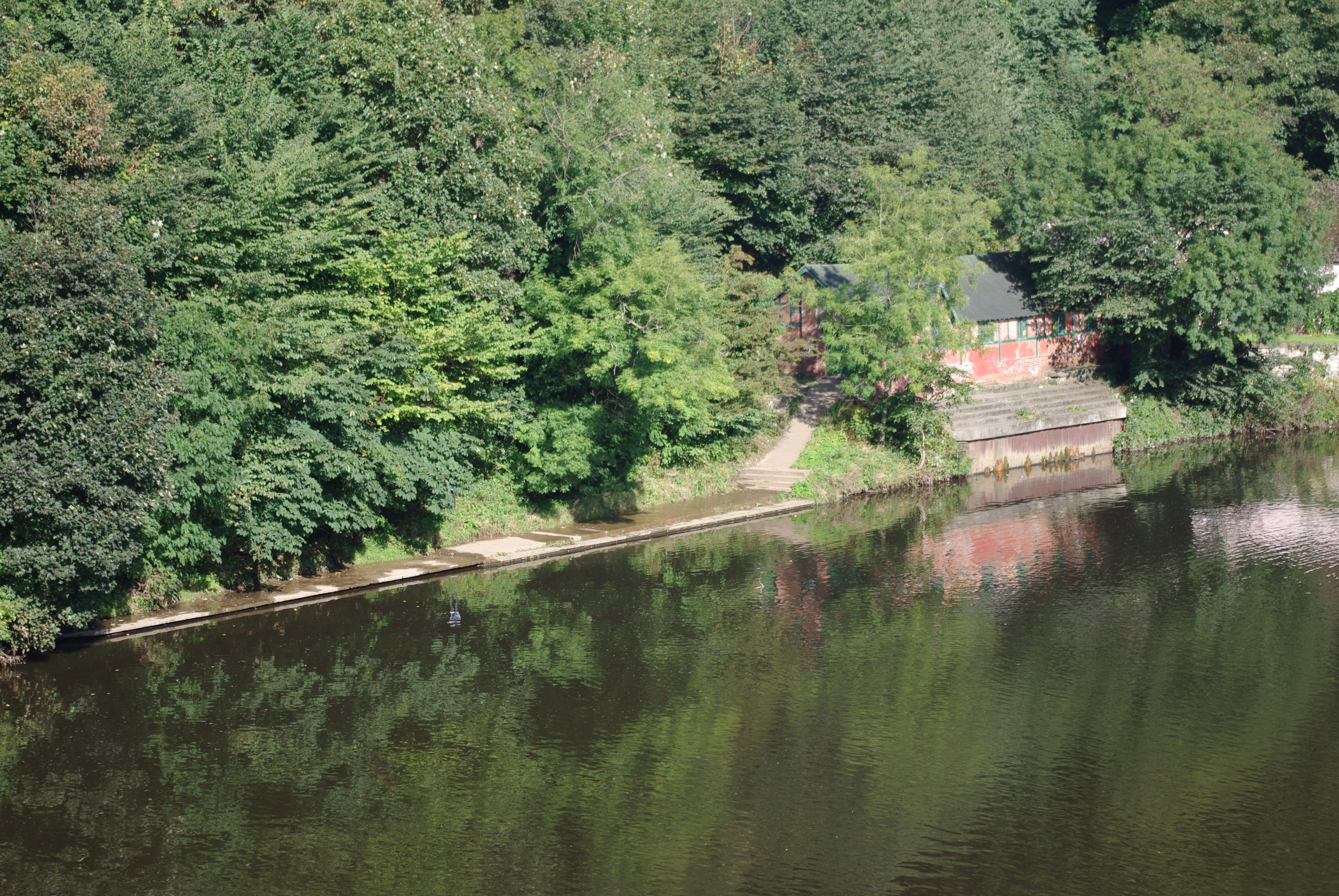
Durham School Boat Club's boathouse seen from Prebends Bridge, United Kingdom

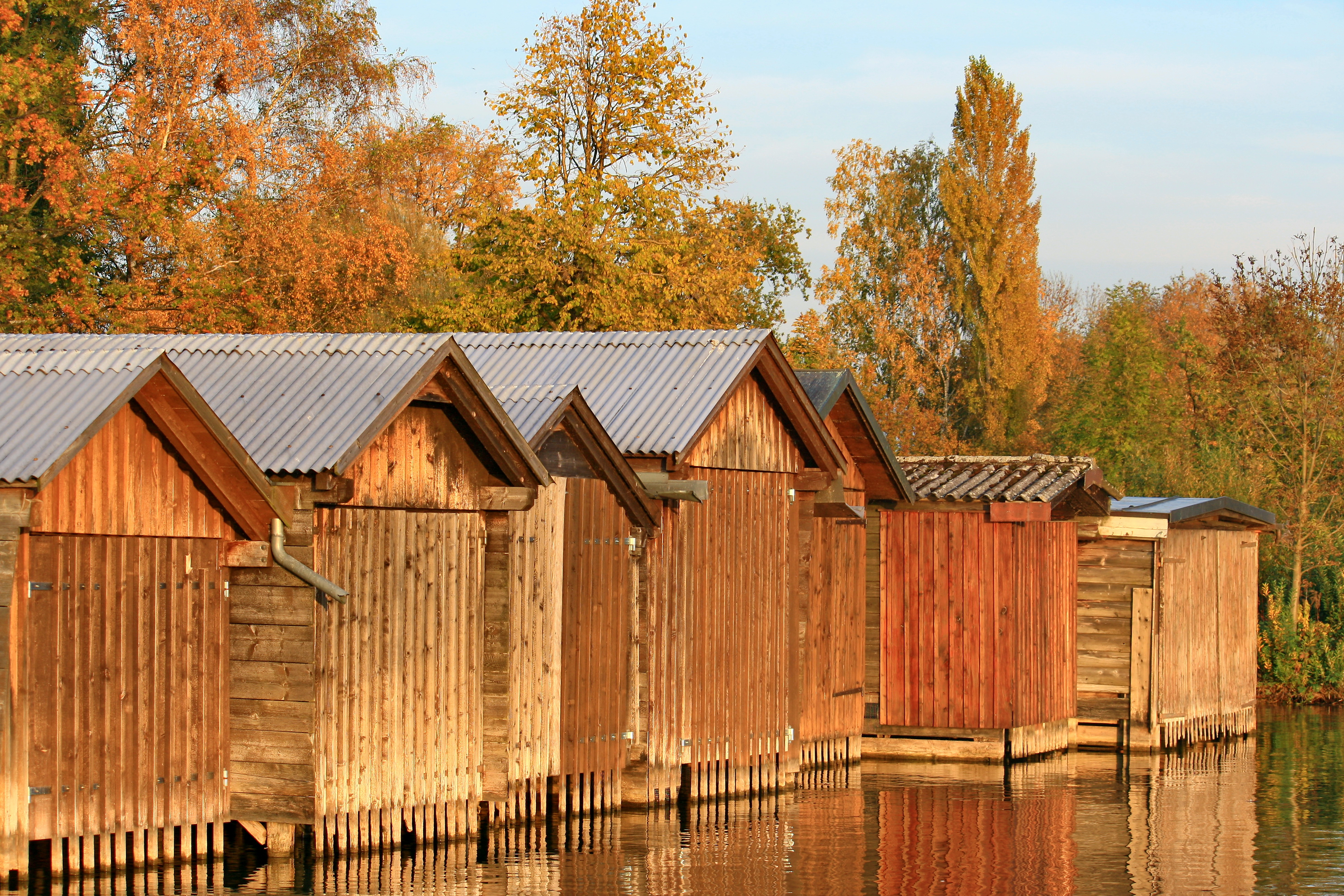
Boathouse on upper Lake Zürich in Jona-Busskirch, Switzerland

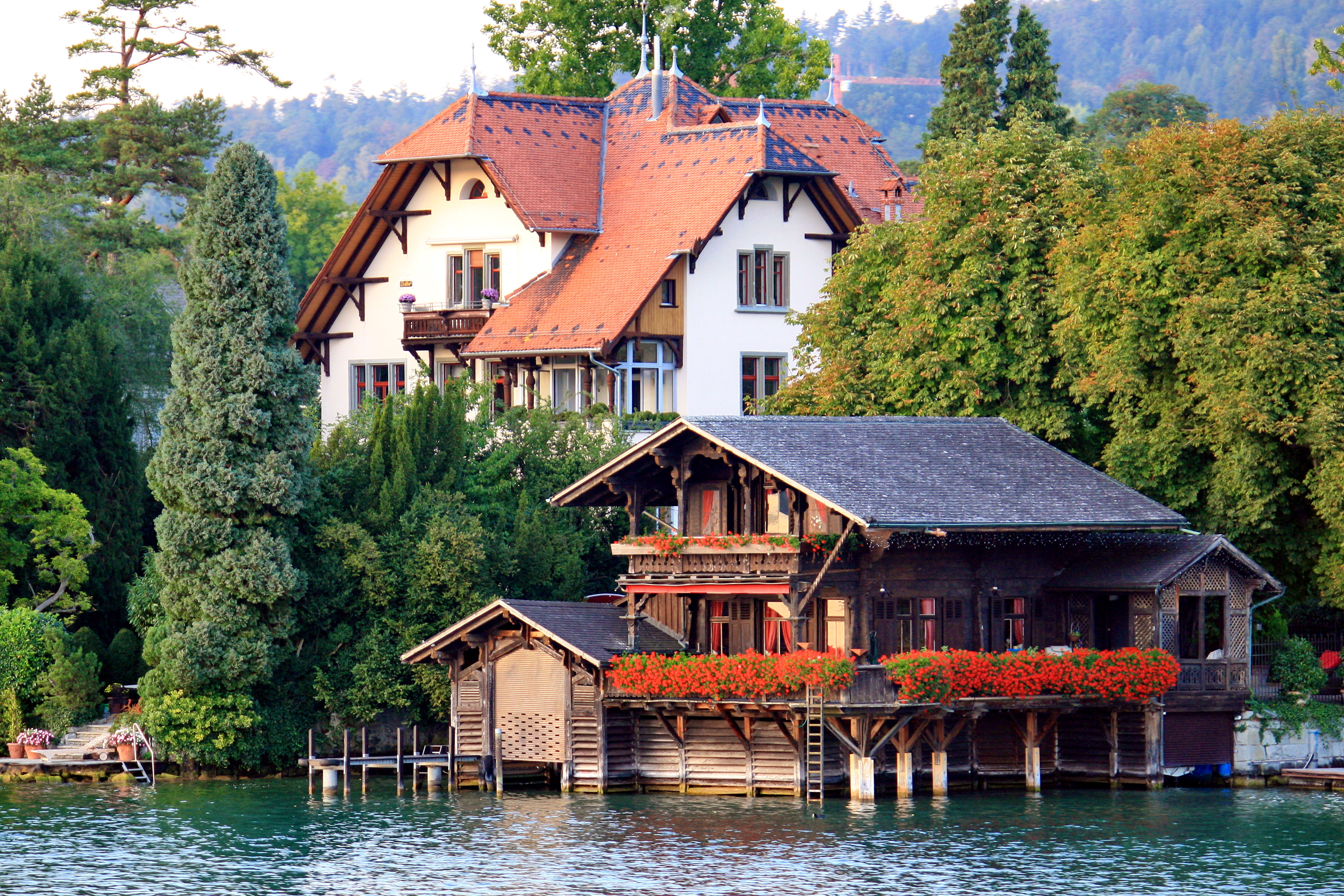
Boathouse on Lake Zürich in Zollikon, Switzerland

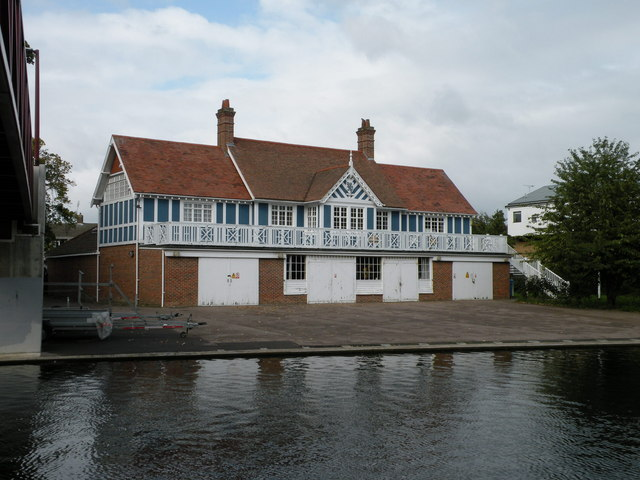
Emmanuel College boathouse on the Cam at Cambridge, United Kingdom

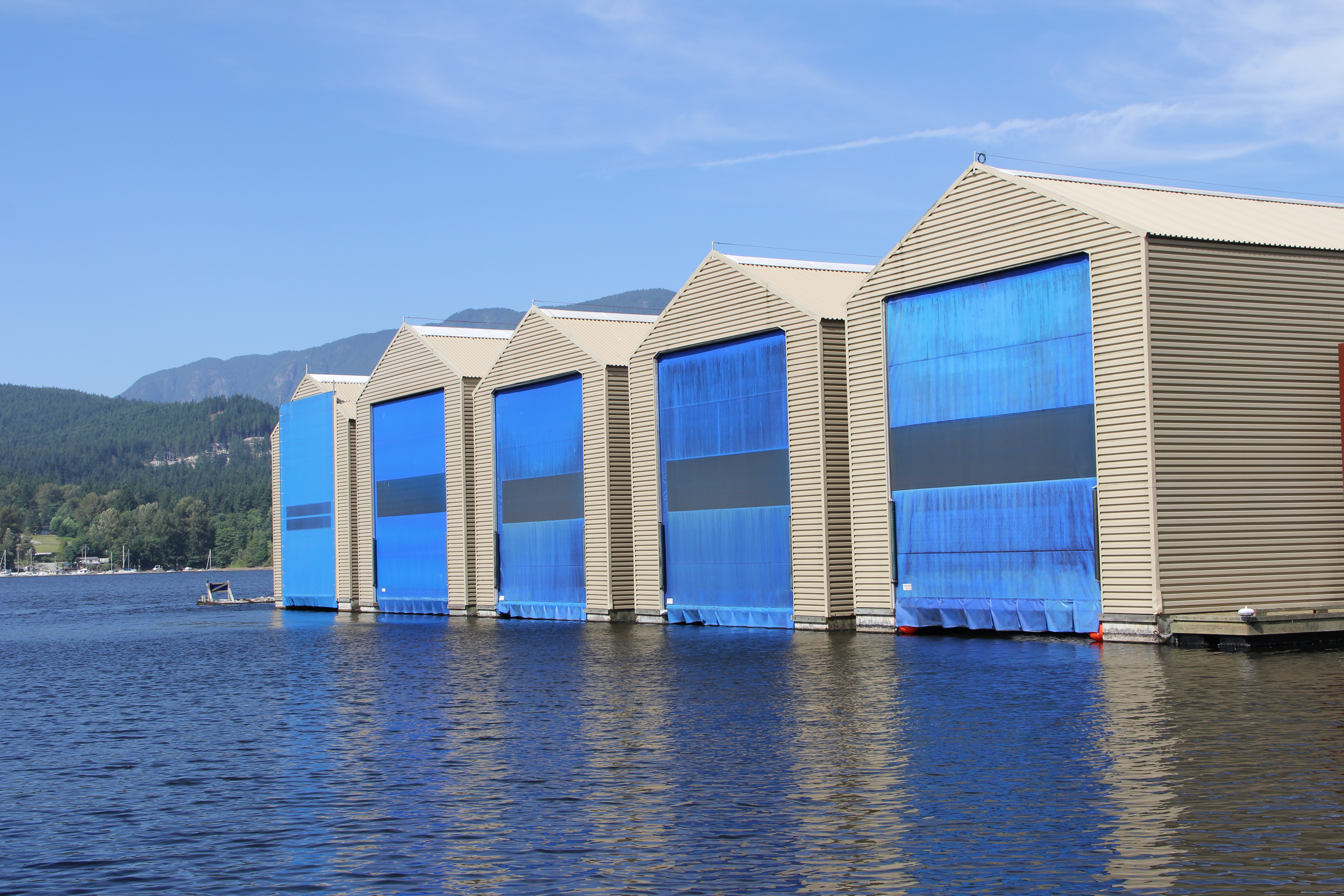
Large boathouses in Reed Point Marina, Canada

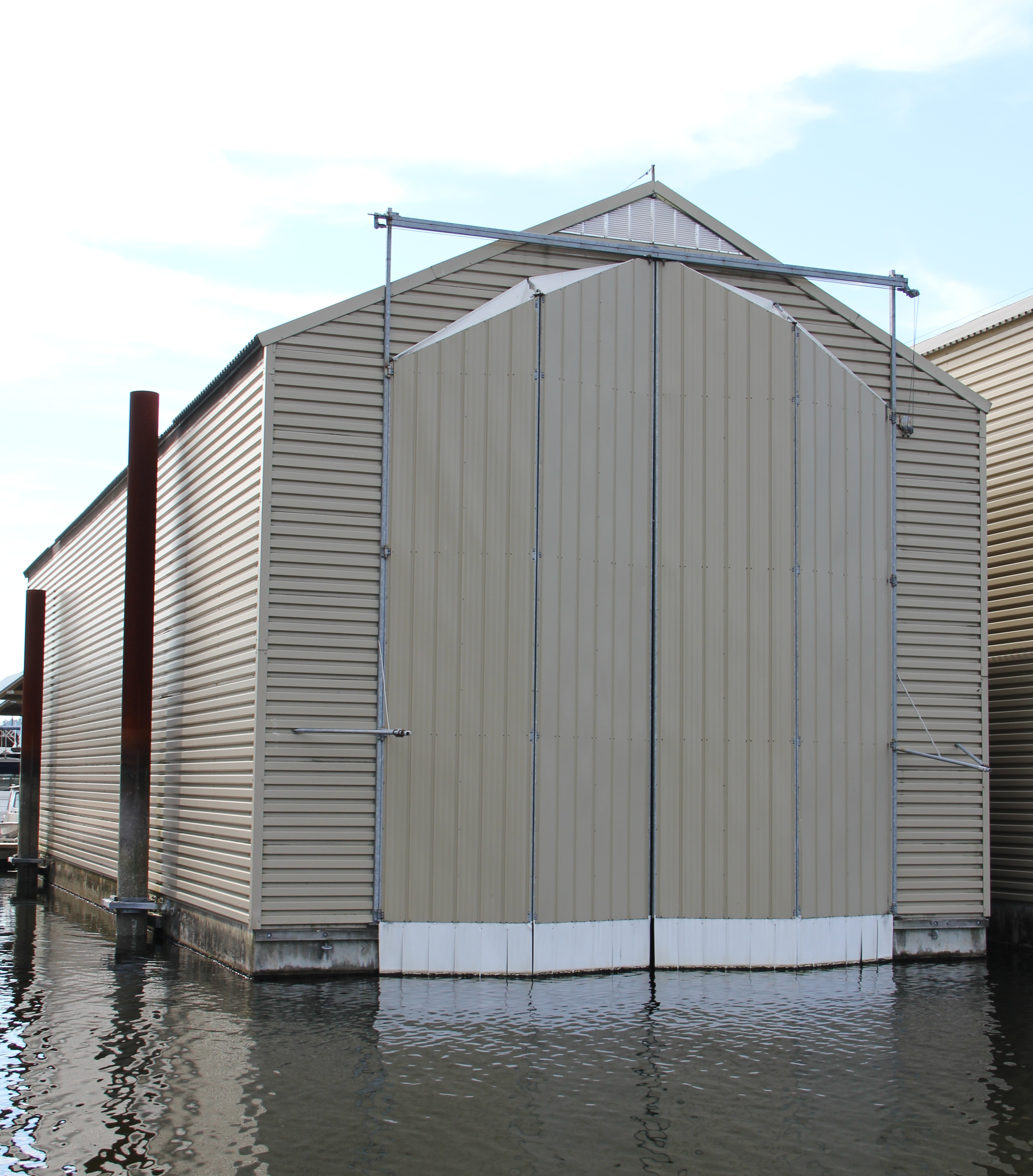
Another style of boathouse in Reed Point Marina, Canada

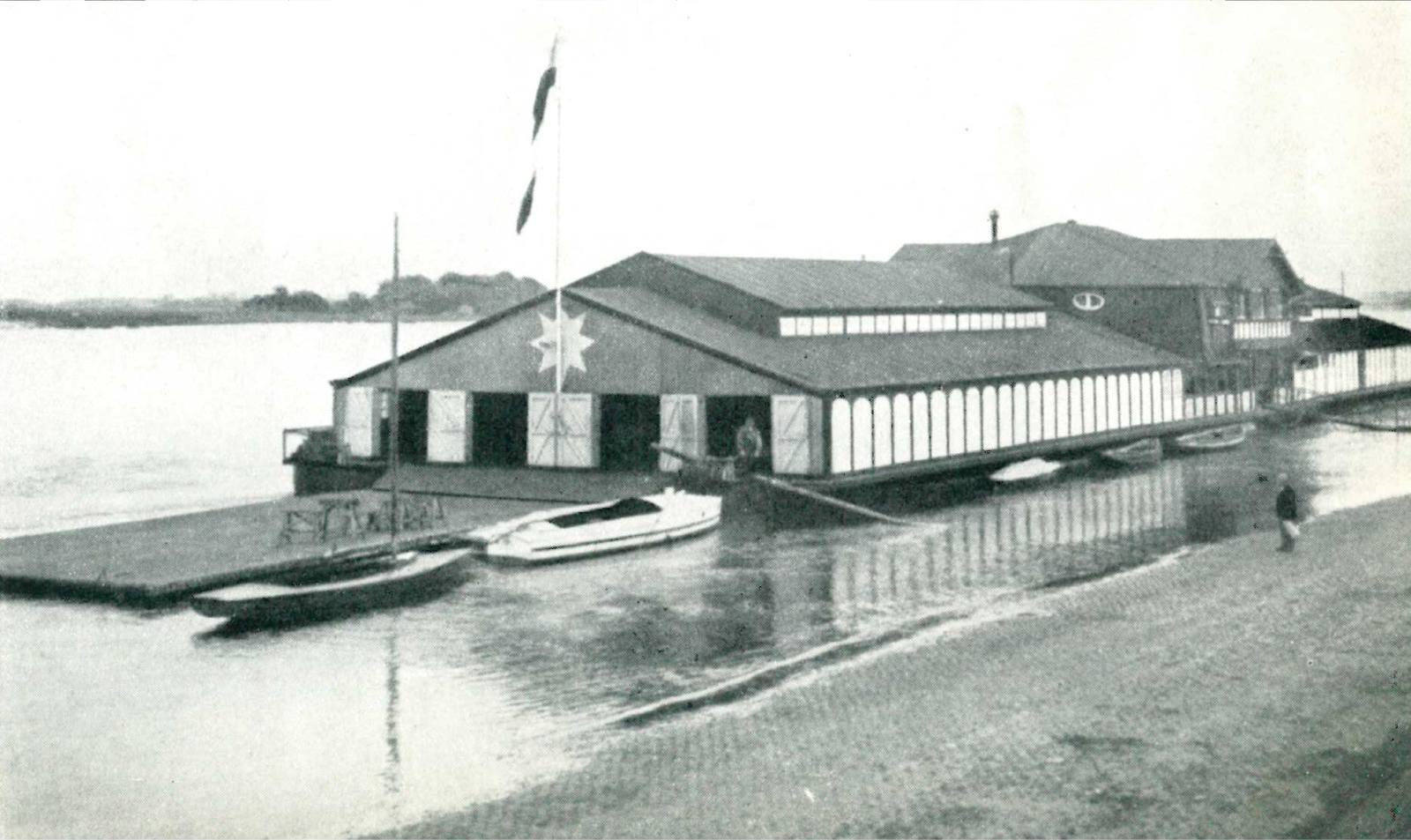
The floating boathouse of the Kölner Rudergesellschaft 1891 in Cologne, Germany

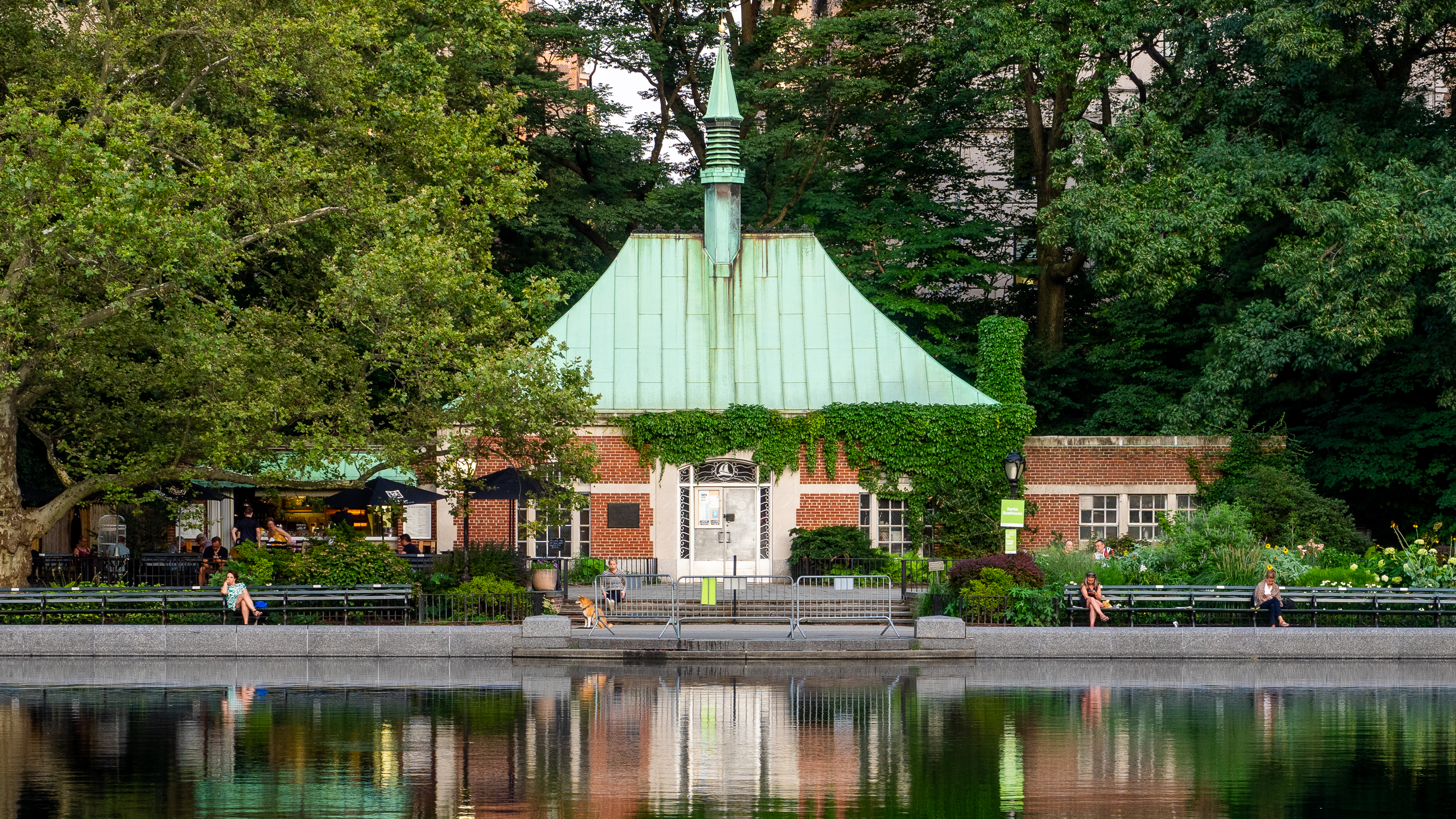
The Kerbs Memorial Boathouse on Conservatory Water in Central Park in Manhattan, New York City

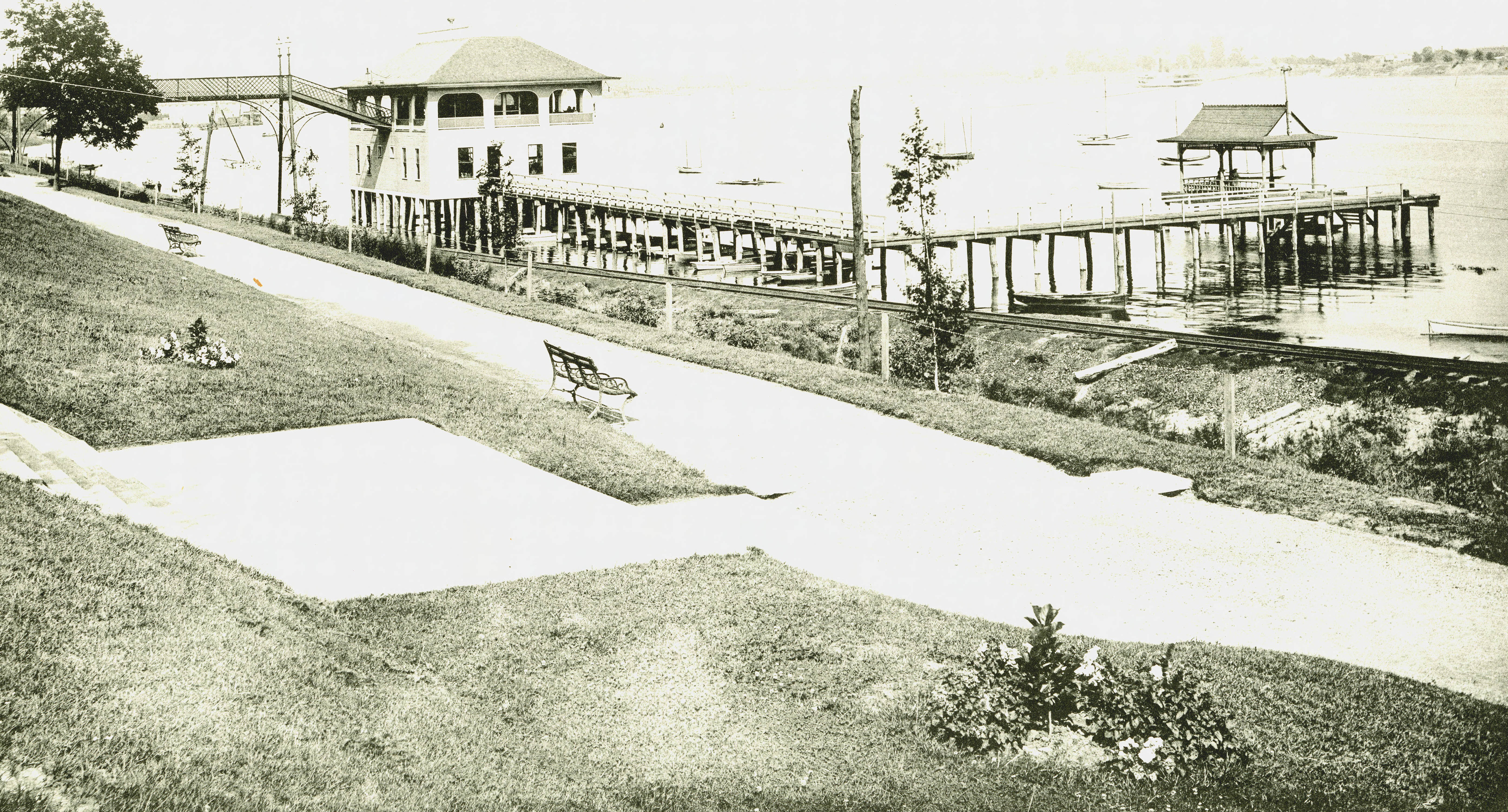
Riverside Pavilion and Boathouse in Toledo, Ohio, 1895

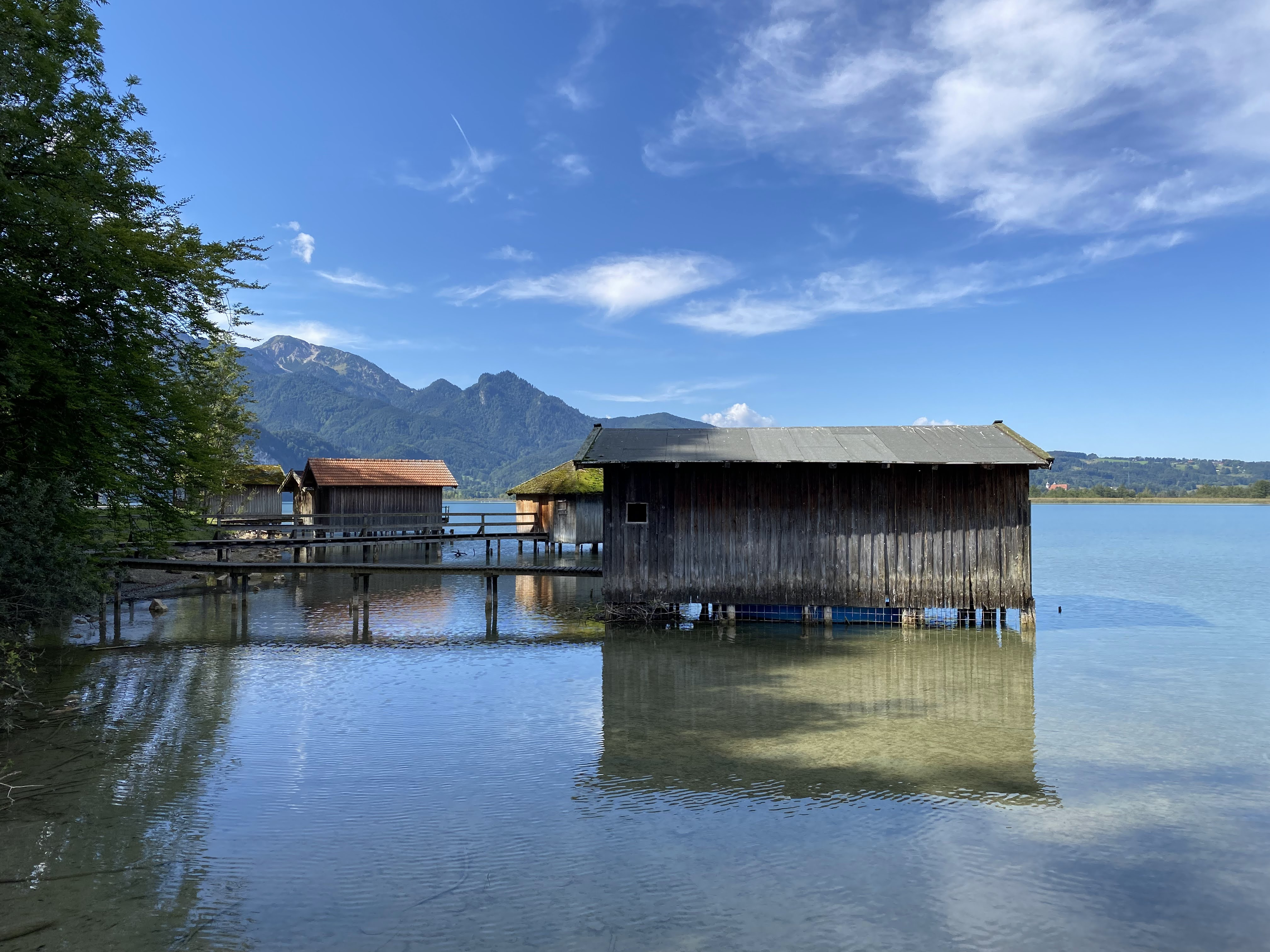
Boathouses built entirely over the water on Kochelsee, Bavaria, Germany

== See also ==
- Boatshed
- Houseboat, a boat used as a house.
- Stilt house
- Ine-ura
- List of Charles River boathouses
