= Chester Cathedral Choir School =

Private preparatory boys school in England

Location
- Abbey Square; Chester, Cheshire; England; 53°11′31″N 2°53′31″W

Information
- Type: Private
- Motto: Latin: "Laudate Dominum Pueri" (Praise the Lord, Boys!)
- Religious affiliation: Church of England
- Established: 1891; 135 years ago
- Closed: 1975; 51 years ago
- Local authority: Cheshire
- Last Headmaster: Mr. D.F. Ray (acting)
- First Headmaster: Rev. J.M. New
- Gender: Boys
- Age: 8 to 13
- Enrolment: 80 (at closure)
- Houses: 3
- Colours: Red Yellow Green

Chester Cathedral Choir School was a private preparatory school for boys under the direct supervision of the Dean of Chester Cathedral providing choristers for the choir. In its modern form, the school was opened by 1891 and closed at the end of summer term 1975. In 1973 the school's roll was 83 boys in 5 classes with the largest class of 22.

A boys' school and choristers for the abbey existed pre-reformation which continued until 1851. A separate choir school was established for the first time in 1851. By 1880 choristers were admitted to the King's school and then in 1891 the school separated again until it closed in 1975.

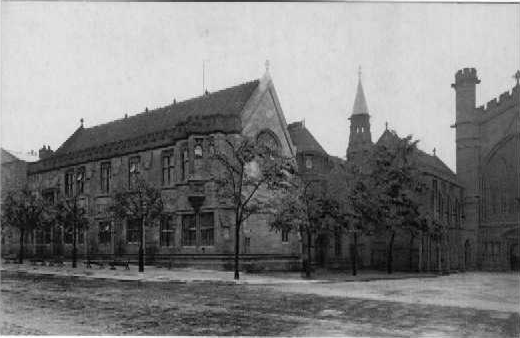
Chester Cathedral Choir School Main Building

== History ==
Boy choristers had been a feature of the pre-reformation church in England from at least the 7th Century and there is evidence that there was a school and boy choristers at the Benedictine Abbey of St. Werburgh, Chester before the English Reformation.

During the English Reformation and the Dissolution of the monasteries, in 1541 the Abbey of St. Werburgh was closed and a new cathedral was established in the same buildings. The legal statutes for the new Chester Cathedral set out the roles and responsibilities of the Dean, Canons, and others associated with the cathedral. The statutes created a grammar school at Chester Cathedral (for the teaching of Latin grammar, and other subjects "for 24 poor and friendless boys") and also established eight choristers and their choirmaster. The cathedral would be responsible for the education, board and lodgings of both scholars and choristers.

For 300 years, until the mid nineteenth century the choristers received some general education in the King's School. (Note: By the mid eighteenth century, the grammar school started to be called the King's Cathedral Grammar School, or King's School.) However whilst the statutes referred to the possibility of boys being in the choir and in the grammar school, this was not always the case: the statutes did not demand education for choristers other than in singing and divine services but did afford preferential access to the grammar school.

By the mid-nineteenth century in common with many schools funded by private endowment, schooling at the cathedral was suffering poor financial support, inefficiencies and accusations of maladministration. It was claimed the cathedral reduced scholar numbers whilst focusing on choristers, failed to pay endowments for university positions for scholars, and was not funding the grammar school properly, i.e. both staff salary and pupil stipends for subsistence were grossly insufficient.

In 1851, Chester Cathedral Choristers were taught separately in their own school for the first time. By 1857 the schools were operating completely separately:.

The Endowed Schools Act 1869 resulted in continued endowment from the cathedral to the King's School, but at the same time removed requirements for some endowed grammar schools to have teachers licensed by the Church of England. Following the King's School improvements and reorganisation under this act in 1873, by 1880, choristers were again receiving general education at the grammar school. (Note: Dean Howson commented at the time that the cathedral having to continue the historical endowment of £280 p.a. to the King's School was an injustice.)

The final reorganisation of the choristers' schooling commenced under Dean Darby (1886-1919) in 1891 when their education was separate from the King's School again. The school operated as an independent private preparatory school called the Chester Cathedral Choir School from this time.

In 1936, the school offered places to non-singers for the first time, with fees of £5 5s. per term. Non-singers would boost the roll to a limit of 40.

By 1944, there were four classes with mixed ages and abilities. Board of Education inspectors commented on the unusual setting for the school but the overall lack of qualifications and teaching skills of the three full-time and two part-time teachers.

In 1973, HM Inspectors of Schools carried out a full inspection of the school. Many issues were identified with accommodation and facilities, teaching, timetables and the school as a community. Most of the issues stemmed from either the limitations of the buildings, or significant demands on staff and governors when running a very small school with modern demands made upon them.

In the same year, the Dean and Chapter realized "the writing was on the wall" and that the school would have to close. Reasons given included inflationary pressures, the small intake of the school (80), the inability of the building to allow expansion and the significant capital expenditure to move premises.

With some boys transferring to King's and other schools, Chester Cathedral Choir School closed at the end of the Summer Term 1975. (Note: It is interesting to note that whilst A.L.Munday, the headmaster of King's stated in 1974 that the choir school was "an off-shoot of the Kings school and ... returning" after 100 years, Rev. E. Weir, headmaster of the choir school stated its history back to 1541, i.e. being in its 423rd year in 1963. There was always some controversy in the relationship between the Chester Cathedral Choir School and the King's School.)

== Buildings and facilities ==
For most of the first 310 years from the reformation to the first separation from the grammar school, all boys were taught in the refectory of Chester Cathedral.

Dean Anson (1839-1867) and Howson (1867-1885) oversaw significant renovation of the cathedral, the installation of the cathedral organ in 1875, rebuilding of the southern and western part of Abbey Square, replacement of the Old Bishop's Palace and overall improvements to church musical achievements. At that time, the King's School moved into the new buildings from their ancient home in the original monks refectory to part of the rebuilt section of Abbey Square.

The choir practice room at this time was the refectory (which King's had just exited). However, this period of construction also provided choir school rooms under the cathedral library where the old Bishop's Palace used to be.

By 1944, the school used various rooms in the cathedral buildings. A chapel was used for assembly (most likely St Anselm's), the refectory used for various activities including physical education and four classrooms in the rebuilt Old Bishop's Palace.

Choir School and Deanery Field

In 1960, the King's School moved out of the premises in Abbey Square. In 1963, the Choir School moved into these neo-gothic buildings of the 1870s after some adjustments, for example partitioning the main hall to produce a dining hall. The school was in one building with two stories. The ground floor had a single corridor with classrooms and washroom off. The boys' toilets were to be found in a lean-to outside. The school had the use of the Deanery Fields for games.

The HM Inspectors' report from 1973 includes many details including the year II classroom being small and dark and the overall impression of the building was "cramped and drab", "uninviting and impoverished". The report stated, "whilst some of the accommodation is of architectural and aesthetic merit it falls short of what could be reasonably expected of a school of this size...".

== Fees ==
Generally throughout the existence of the Choir School, choristers received their education paid for by the cathedral and largely free to the chorister and his family. Fees became payable for non-singers only when the school expanded in the twentieth century.

The statues of the cathedral established in 1541 that the scholars of the grammar school and the choristers would have their education, board and lodgings paid by the cathedral. A stipend was reintroduced in 1852 as payment to the boys of the school and choir of £3 6s. 8d. reportedly as set out in the statutes of King Henry VIII which continued to be paid without any consideration of inflation until at least 1919.

In 1940, choristers still received their stipend and non-singers' fees were £5 5s. per term. By 1973, "Fees are £100 a term except for singing boys who pay £5.25 a term during their first and second years ... and no fees as such thereafter".

== See also ==
- King's School, Chester
