= Roger Wickson (headmaster) =

English headmaster (born 1940)

Anthony Roger Dorrien Wickson
- Born: 1940 (age 85–86); Croydon
- Education: Whitgift School; Sidney Sussex College
- Occupations: historian headmaster
- Spouse: Sue Wickson
- Children: 2

Anthony Roger Dorrien Wickson (born 1940) was headmaster of the King's School, Chester, where he worked from 1981 until his retirement in 2000. Born and raised in Croydon, Wickson was educated at Whitgift School and Sidney Sussex College, Cambridge, where he read history. Narrowly missing out on national service, Wickson embarked upon a career as a teacher. After undertaking a brief training period at Charterhouse School, he moved on to Ardingly College. In a career that spanned four decades, Wickson taught in a number of southern schools before becoming head of Shaftesbury Grammar School and, thereafter, The King's School, Chester.

During his time at King's, Wickson oversaw its extension, including the construction of a sports hall and extensions to the Junior School, and presided over the admission of girls into the Sixth Form in 1998. The school's library, built in 2000, is named in his honour.

A canal boat enthusiast, Wickson has painted wooden stools and other canal boat paraphernalia, often for charity. He has also written a book on this topic: Britain’s inland waterways (London, Methuen; New York, Roy Publishers, 1968).

Wickson is also passionate about medieval history - notably the medieval Church and its monastic subsidiaries - and he continues to teach at Keele University. He has written a book on medieval England: The community of the realm in thirteenth century England (London 1970).

Wickson is an enthusiast for the work of Gilbert and Sullivan, and produced their operettas in the schools in which he worked.

Now retired, Wickson is married to Sue, and they have two children.
