= Michael Burdekin =

British engineer

Professor Michael Burdekin OBE FRS FREng

Professor of Civil and Structural Engineering, University of Manchester Institute of Science and Technology
- In office 1977–2002

Personal details
- Born: Frederick Michael Burdekin; 5 February 1938 (age 88) Hawarden, Flintshire, Wales

Frederick Michael Burdekin (born 5 February 1938) is a British civil engineer, and emeritus professor at University of Manchester Institute of Science and Technology and the University of Manchester.

== Early life and education ==
Michael Burdekin was born in Hawarden, Flintshire in 1938. From 1945 to 1949 he attended the Choir School in Chester, singing in the cathedral choir. He then attended The King's School, Chester from 1949 to 1956. He was captain of cricket for 3 years and played cricket for Flintshire County Cricket Club at the age of 16. He was Head Boy in his final year and was awarded a State Scholarship to study Mechanical Sciences at Trinity Hall, Cambridge. During two years National Service in the Royal Artillery, he played cricket at Western Command level. He then went to study at the University of Cambridge and graduated in 1961 with first class honours in Mechanical Sciences and was awarded a titular major scholarship by his college on graduation. Whilst at Cambridge he played cricket for Cambridge University Crusaders Cricket Club against Oxford University Authentics in 1959 and 1960 and was elected to the Cambridge University Hawks Club in 1961.

== Career ==
On leaving Cambridge University in 1961 he joined what was then the British Welding Research Association, (now the Welding institute, TWI) and rose to become a Principal Scientific Officer in 1967. His research work there was in the field of applying fracture mechanics to structural integrity of welded structures and he was heavily involved in the development of the crack tip opening displacement approach to prevention of brittle fracture failures in steel structures which has become a significant factor in safety of offshore structures. He then joined Messrs Sandberg, Consulting Engineers, responsible for their team of welding inspectors checking the quality of construction of many of the steel bridges being constructed in the 1970s for the motorway network. In 1977 he was appointed Professor of Civil and Structural Engineering at UMIST where he remained until retiring in December 2002. During his time at UMIST he was Head of the Department of Civil and Structural Engineering for 12 of his 25-year period and he was Vice Principal for External Affairs from 1981 to 1983. His research at UMIST took up again the subject of fracture mechanics applied to welded structures and he has published over 200 papers in the technical literature.

== Awards ==
He was elected a Fellow of the Royal Academy of Engineering in 1987 and a Fellow of the Royal Society in 1993. He has been awarded the Gold Medal of the Institution of Structural Engineers (1998), the James Alfred Ewing Medal of the Institution of Civil Engineers (1995), the Brooker Medal of the Welding Institute (1996), the Ludwig Mond Prize (1971) and James Clayton Prize (1982) of the Institution of Mechanical Engineers and the Arata Prize of the International Institute of Welding (1997) and an Honorary Fellowship of the Welding Institute (2007). He delivered the Institution of Mechanical Engineers John Player Lecture in 1981 and again in 2006, the Brunel International Lecture of the Institution of Civil Engineers in 11 places around the world in 2000 and the Institute of Materials Finniston Lecture also in 2000. He was President of the Manchester Association of Engineers from 2003 to 2005 and President of the Welding Institute from 2004 to 2006. He was appointed an OBE in the Queen's Birthday Honours in 2008 for service to nuclear safety as a result of his contributions to structural integrity of nuclear power plant.

== Community Involvement ==
He was a governor of The King's School, Macclesfield from 1986 to 2009 and Chairman of Governors from 2005 to 2009. He continued his involvement in cricket after retiring from playing by becoming President of Macclesfield Cricket Club from 1996 to 2010. After retiring from academic life he was asked to assist in local community affairs in Bollington and he has been chairman of the steering committees for the Bollington Parish Plan (2004), the update to the Bollington Town Plan (2008) and the Bollington Neighbourhood Plan (made 2018).

== Works ==
- Buick Davison; Graham W. Owens, eds. (2005). Steel designers' manual. John Wiley. ISBN 978-1-4051-3412-5.

Over 200 technical research publications in the general subject area of structural integrity and fracture mechanics.
