= Reed Point Marina =

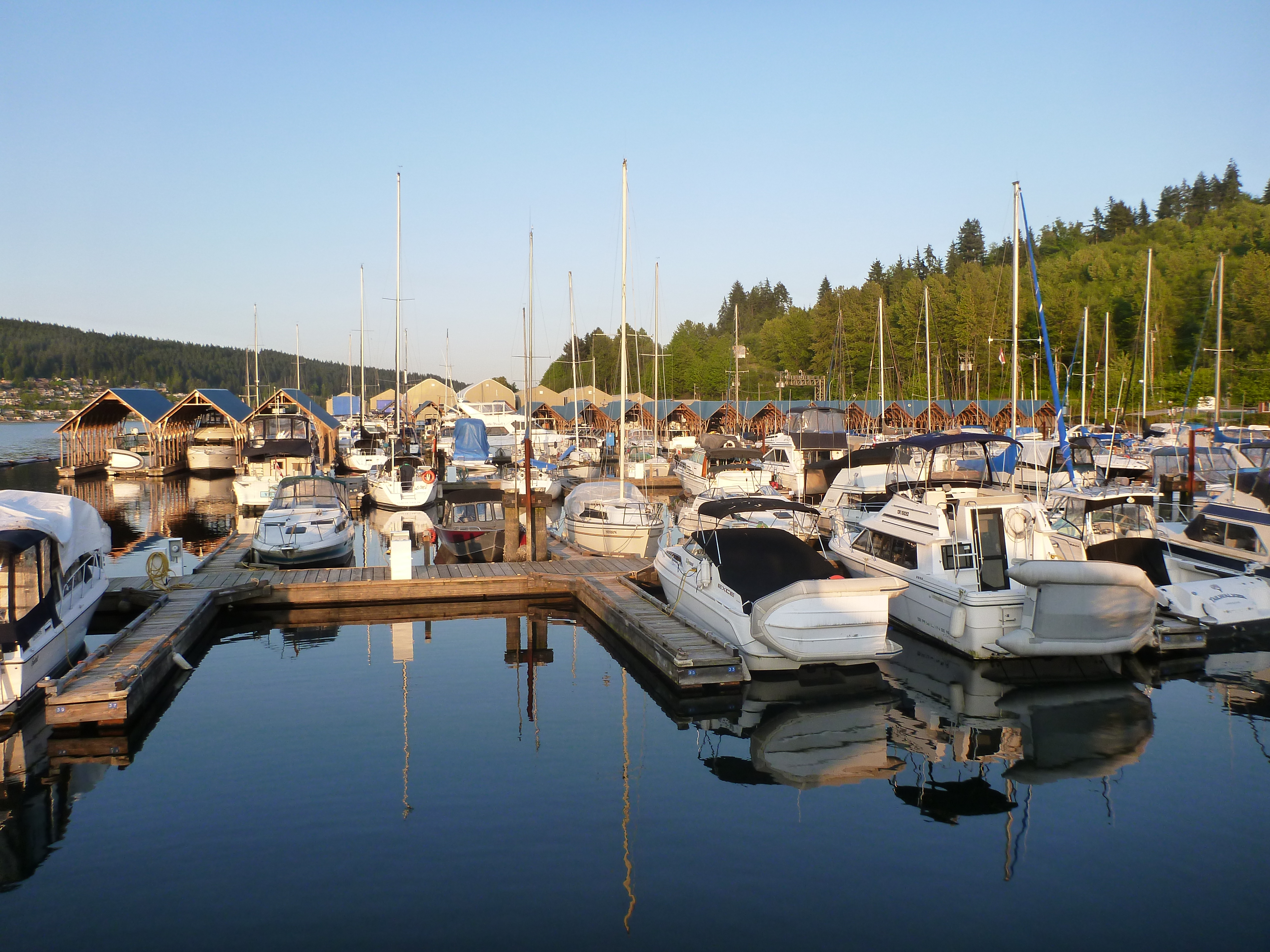
- Click on the map for a fullscreen view

Location
- Country: Canada
- Location: Port Moody, British Columbia
- Coordinates: 49°17′33.61″N 122°52′50.01″W

Details
- No. of berths: Approx. 800
- City: Port Moody, British Columbia
- Max boat length: 100 feet

Statistics
- Website http://www.reedpoint.com

Reed Point Marina is an 800-berth marina in British Columbia, Canada. Reed Point Marina has an onsite yacht broker, [casual dining restaurant], full repairs, fuel dock and 24-hour security. It is situated 2.5 kilometres (1.6 mi) away from Port Moody, 26 kilometres (16 mi) from Vancouver and five minutes from Indian Arm. Reed Point Marina is also involved in marine research. The marina has donated dock space to study Steller sea lions. The research project began in 1993 and the lead investigators include Drs. Andrew Trites and David Rosen from the University of British Columbia.

== Facilities ==
=== Boatyard ===
Reed Point Marina has a boatyard which accommodates all boats that can be lifted by the marina's 50 Ton TraveLift.

=== Fuel ===
Premium Unleaded and Diesel fuel are available from the fuel dock in Reed Point Marina, 7 days a week.

=== Launching ===
Vessels can be lowered into the water by the 50 Ton TraveLift. Inlet Marine operates the Travelift. There is not a boat launch for vehicles towing trailers. The nearest boat launch is Rocky Point Park.

=== Restaurant ===
Reed point also features a licensed general cuisine restaurant.

== Wet Berth ==
One of Reed Point Marina's services is secure wet berths for vessels up to 100 feet in length. All berths are serviced with water, power and fire fighting equipment. Reed point Marina has approximately 800 wet berths. Out of the 800 wet berths, there are over 40 boat houses, 80 covered berths and 650 open berths.

Reed Point Marina
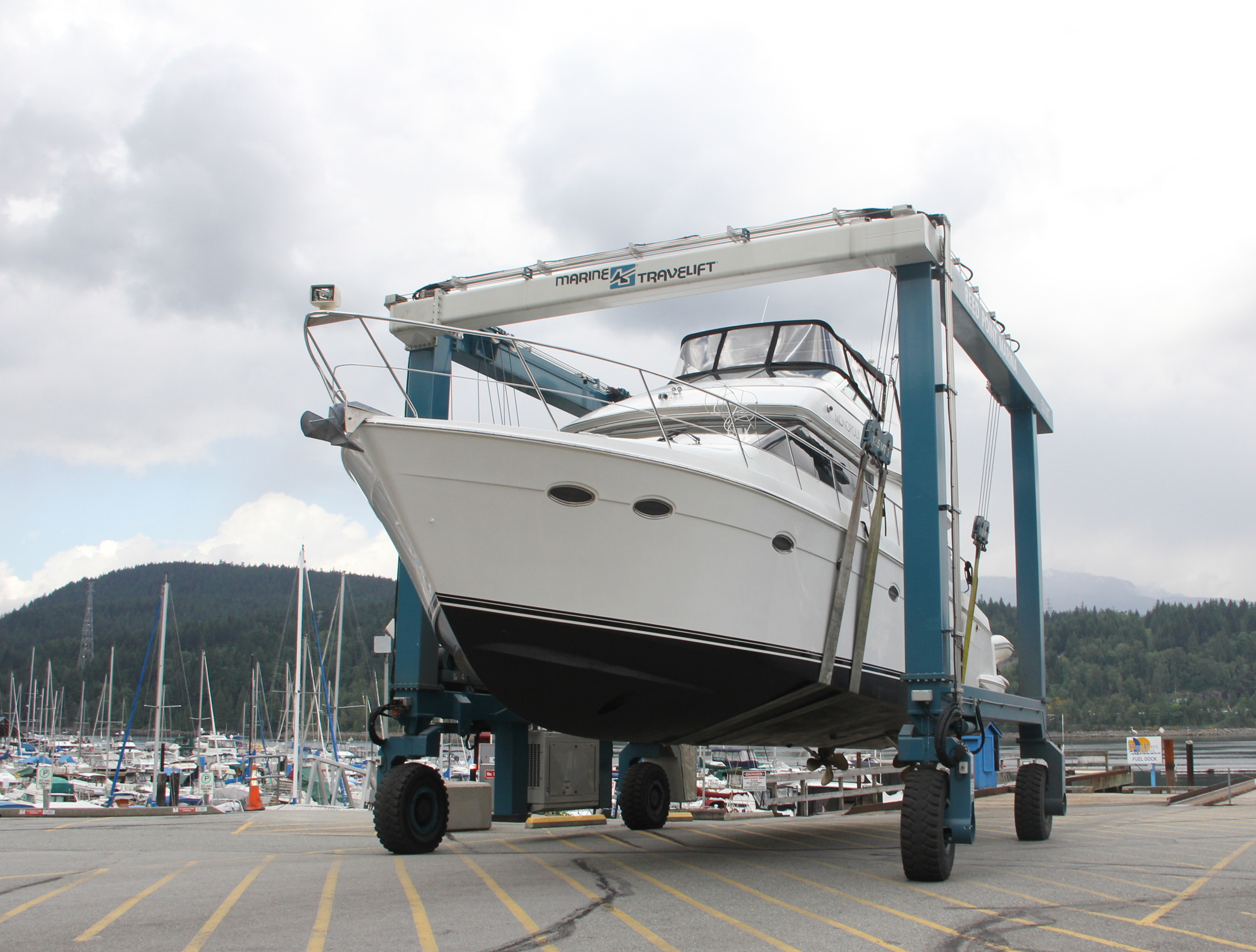
The 50 Ton TraveLife transporting a large yacht.

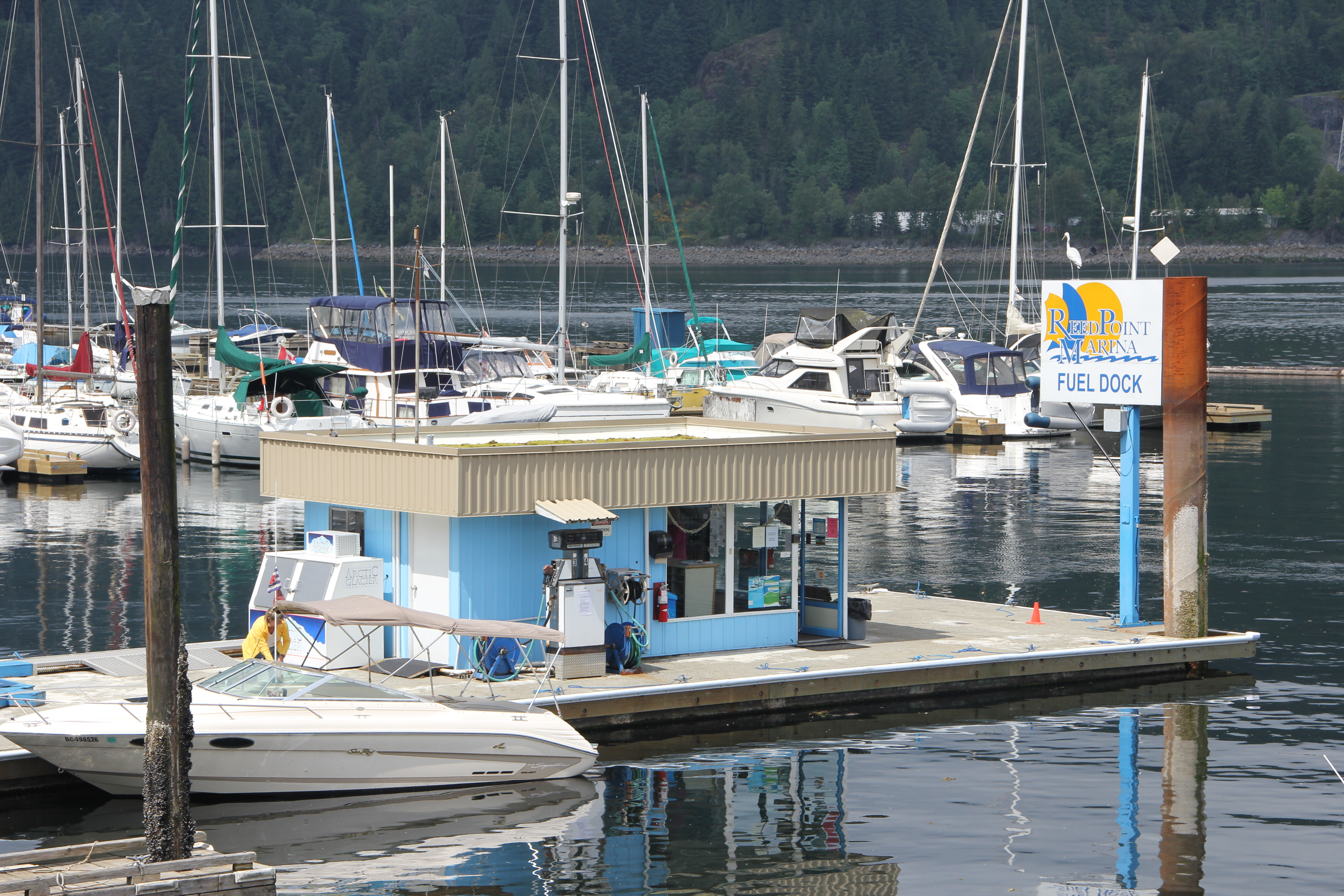
Reed Point Marina's fuel dock.
