= The Midnight Charter =

Young adult fantasy novel by David Whitley

- Author: David Whitley
- Cover artist: Tomislav Tomic
- Language: English
- Series: Agora Trilogy
- Genre: Fantasy
- Publisher: Puffin
- Publication date: 2009
- Publication place: United Kingdom
- Media type: Print paperback
- Pages: 384
- ISBN: 0-14-132371-X
- Followed by: The Children of the Lost

The Midnight Charter is a young adult fantasy novel by David Whitley. It is the first novel in the Agora Trilogy, and the author's debut novel. It was nominated for the 2010 Carnegie Medal, but lost to Neil Gaiman's The Graveyard Book.

== Concept ==
The book is set in a fantasy world called Agora, which is governed by an extreme form of capitalism. Anything can be bought and sold - including thoughts, ideas, emotions and ultimately people. Children are traded by their parents, and only on their twelfth birthday are they allowed to become traders themselves.

There is no money in Agora. Instead, people are ranked according to their reputation. It only takes a small rumour or wrongdoing to send even the most powerful merchant down to the bottom, where they normally become "debtors". With nothing left to trade, they are stuck at the bottom, with no means to climb back up the social hierarchy.

Agora is surrounded by walls. Nobody enters the city, and nobody leaves the city. The city itself is split into twelve districts, all named after Zodiac signs. The Director of Receipts watches over the city, and his Receivers police it.

== Plot summary ==
The novel starts with Mark in a delirious, dream-like state because he suffers from a deadly fever. He has been sold by his father to Dr Theophilus in the hope that he will treat Mark. While he is being treated, he meets Lily, a servant to the doctor's grandfather, Count Stelli, the city's greatest astrologer. She helps him adjust to his new life. Mark is soon cured of the terrible fever and will soon leave Count Stelli's tower with Dr Theophilus and become his assistant. But Mark does not want to go and brokers a deal with Lily; he will stay and serve the Count and she will leave the horrid tower and learn about medicine with the doctor.

While Lily and Dr Theophilus struggle to survive, Mark is taught how to be an astrologer by the Count. Soon, with the aid of Mr Snutworth, Mark plans to overthrow the old Count and become the greatest astrologer himself. In the meantime, Lily comes up with a shocking idea; provide free accommodation, medical care and food to debtors and those in need of it. She, Dr Theophilus and two others start an almshouse.

Mark manages to overthrow the Count and soon becomes a powerful astrologer himself, living in high society. On numerous occasions, Lily asks Mark for his support of the almshouse, but he declines, stating that he and his reputation would be at stake. With the aid of Mr Snutworth, Mark soon becomes the most powerful person in all of Agora, bar the Director.

Both Mark and Lily are being watched by the Director, and while Mark is pondering marrying Cherubina, he orders Snutworth to betray Mark and take his power. Snutworth has known what he must do all along, and Mark soon falls from power and becomes a debtor. He is put in prison pending investigation. Snutworth replaces Mark as astrologer.

While in prison, Lily is summoned to the Director of Receipts. The Director tells her about the Midnight Charter that was made by the founders of Agora, and gives her a choice; be banished from Agora, and take Mark with her, or else. She decides to leave Agora, and before Mark knows what is happening, he and Lily are dumped outside the city walls, with no way back in. Mark is furious with Lily, as he had only newly discovered that his father was a prison warden and he wanted to spend more time with him.

== Characters ==
- Mark: a twelve-year-old boy who replaces Count Stelli as Agora's greatest astrologer
- Lily: a twelve-year-old girl who began the Almshouse
- Dr Theophilus: grandson of Count Stelli, works as a doctor, helps Lily run the almshouse
- Count Stelli: an old man, Agora's greatest astrologist
- Mr Snutworth: assistant to Mark after overthrowing the Count
- Director of Receipts: ruler of the entire city of Agora

== Critical reception ==
The Midnight Charter was nominated for the 2010 Carnegie Medal.

The School Library Journal said that The Midnight Charter was "exciting and gripping from the first heart-stopping line”. Publishers Weekly went on to say that "readers will be buoyed by every small triumph that cannot be recorded in an account book".

== See also ==
- The Children of the Lost
- David Whitley
