= Southwell Minster =

Coordinates: 53°4′36″N 0°57′14″W

- Cathedral and Parish Church of the Blessed Virgin Mary
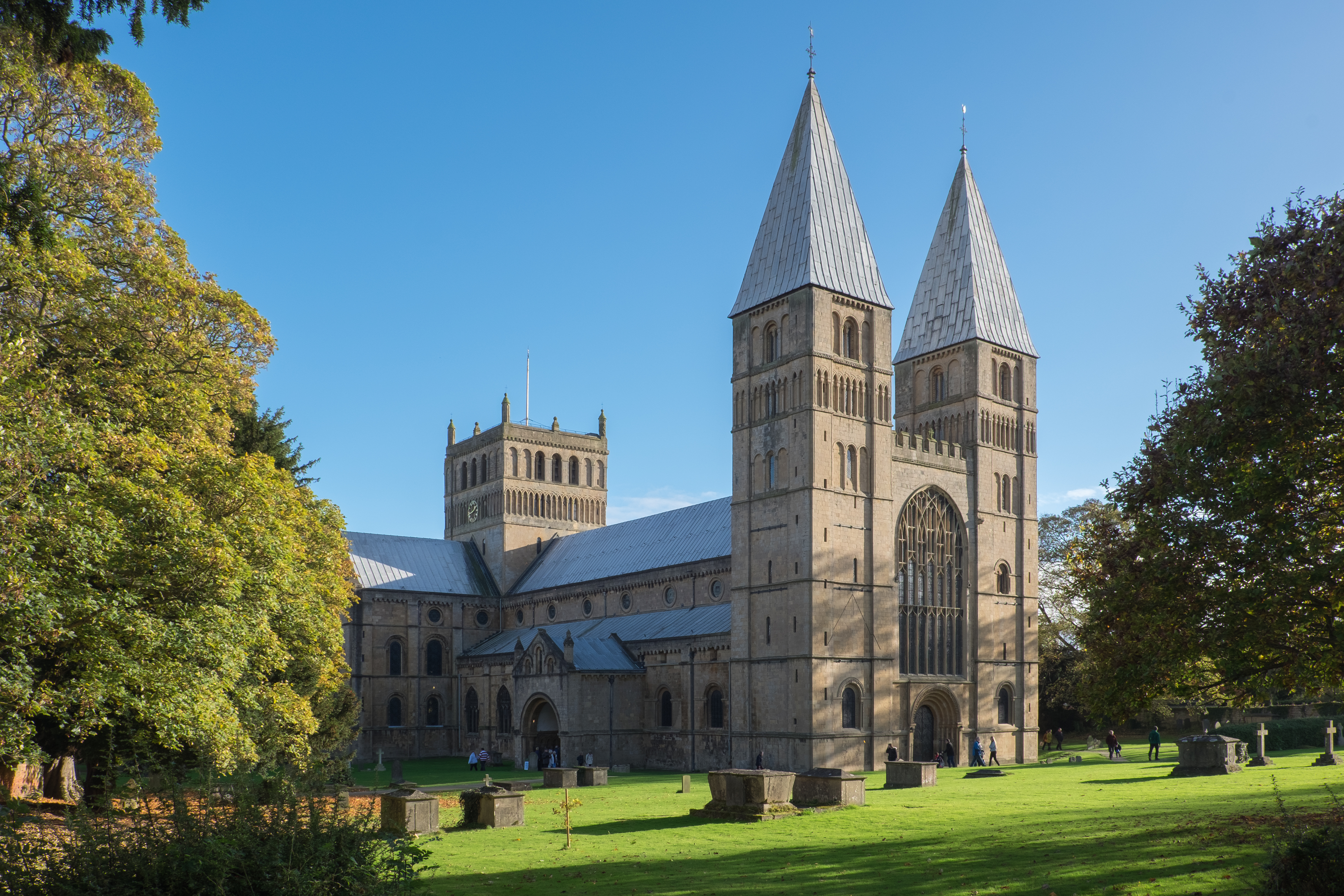

- Shown within Nottinghamshire
- OS grid reference: SK 70171 53802
- Location: Southwell, Nottinghamshire
- Country: England
- Denomination: Church of England
- Previous denomination: Roman Catholic
- Website: Southwell Minster

Architecture
- Style: Romanesque, Gothic
- Years built: c. 1108 – c. 1300

Administration
- Province: York
- Diocese: Southwell and Nottingham

Clergy
- Bishop: Paul Williams
- Dean: Stephen Evans

Southwell Minster, strictly since 1884 Southwell Cathedral, and formally the Cathedral and Parish Church of the Blessed Virgin Mary, is a Church of England cathedral in Southwell, Nottinghamshire, England. The cathedral is the seat of the bishop of Southwell and Nottingham and the mother church of the diocese of Southwell and Nottingham; it is governed by a dean and chapter. It is a Grade I listed building.

The current church is the successor to one built in 956 by Oscytel, Archbishop of York. Some late 11th-century fabric survives from this church, but the majority of the building dates from between 1108 and c. 1150, when it was reconstructed in the Romanesque style. The chancel was rebuilt from 1234 to 1251 in the Early English Gothic style. In 1288 the chapter house was built; it is decorated with carved foliage of exceptional quality. The rood screen is also of high quality.

During the Middle Ages Southwell was part of the large diocese of York, and the archbishop maintained a palace adjacent to the minster. Although it was not a cathedral, the minster acted as the mother church of the surrounding area; Ripon Cathedral and Beverley Minster fulfilled a similar function in other parts of the diocese. The church was collegiate from its foundation until 1841, although the college was twice dissolved and re-founded during the English Reformation. It was a parish church from 1841 until 1884, when it became the cathedral of the new diocese of Southwell covering Nottinghamshire and Derbyshire; in 1927 the diocese was divided by the creation of the diocese of Derby.

== History ==
=== Middle Ages ===
The earliest church on the site is believed to have been founded in 627 by Paulinus, the first Archbishop of York, when he visited the area while baptising believers in the River Trent. The legend is commemorated in the Minster's baptistry window.

In 956 King Eadwig gave land in Southwell to Oskytel, Archbishop of York, on which a minster church was established. The Domesday Book of 1086 recorded the Southwell manor in great detail. The Norman reconstruction of the church began in 1108, probably as a rebuilding of the Anglo-Saxon church, starting at the east end so that the high altar could be used as soon as possible and the Saxon building was dismantled as work progressed. Many stones from this earlier Anglo-Saxon church were reused in the construction. The tessellated floor and late 11th-century tympanum in the north transept are the only parts of the Anglo-Saxon building remaining intact. Work on the nave began after 1120 and the church was completed by c.1150.

The church was originally attached to the Archbishop of York's Palace which stood next door and is now ruined. It served the archbishop as a place of worship and was a collegiate body of theological learning, hence its designation as a minster. The minster draws its choir from the nearby school with which it is associated.

The Norman chancel was square-ended. For a plan of the original church see Clapham (1936). The chancel was replaced with another in the Early English style in 1234–51 because it was too small. The octagonal chapter house, built starting in 1288 with a vault in the Decorated Gothic style has naturalistic carvings of foliage (the 13th-century stonecarving includes several Green Men). The elaborately carved "pulpitum" or choir screen was built in 1320–40.

=== Reformation and civil war ===
The church suffered less than many others in the English Reformation as it was refounded in 1543 by an act of Parliament, the Southwell Collegiate Church Act 1542 (34 & 35 Hen. 8. c. 45 Pr.).

Southwell is where Charles I surrendered to Scottish Presbyterian troops in 1646 during the English Civil War, after the third siege of Newark. The fighting saw the church seriously damaged and the nave is said to have been used as stabling. The adjoining palace was almost completely destroyed, first by Scottish troops and then by the local people, with only the hall of the archbishop remaining as a ruined shell.

=== 18th century ===
On 5 November 1711 the southwest spire was struck by lightning, and the resulting fire spread to the nave, crossing and tower destroying roofs, bells, clock and organ. By 1720 repairs had been completed, now giving a flat panelled ceiling to the nave and transepts.

=== Victorian period ===
In 1805 Archdeacon Kaye gave the Minster the Newstead lectern; once owned by Newstead Abbey, it had been thrown into the abbey fishpond by the monks to save it during the Dissolution of the Monasteries, then later discovered when the lake was dredged. Henry Gally Knight in 1818 gave the Minster four panels of 16th-century Flemish glass (which now fill the bottom part of the East window) which he had acquired from a Parisian pawnshop.

In danger of collapse, the spires were removed in 1805 and re-erected in 1879–81 when the minster was extensively restored by Ewan Christian, an architect specialising in churches. The nave roof was replaced with a pitched roof and the quire was redesigned and refitted.

=== Twenty first century ===
In 2026 media reports state that Southwell Minster, a Grade I listed monument, requires £20m of remedial work and concerns were expressed that it will close in 2027 if funds are not made available.

== Ecclesiastical history ==
=== Collegiate church ===
Southwell Minster was served by prebendaries from the early days of its foundation. By 1291 there were 16 Prebends of Southwell mentioned in the Taxation Roll.

In August 1540, as the dissolution of the monasteries was coming to an end, and despite its collegiate rather than monastic status, Southwell Minster was suppressed specifically in order that it could be included in the plans initiated by King Henry VIII to create several new cathedrals. It appears to have been proposed as the see for a new diocese comprising Nottinghamshire and Derbyshire, as a replacement for Welbeck Abbey which had been dissolved in 1538 and which by 1540 was no longer owned by the Crown.

The plan for the minster's elevation did not proceed, so in 1543 Parliament reconstituted its collegiate status as before. In 1548 it again lost its collegiate status under the 1547 Act of King Edward VI which suppressed (among others) almost all collegiate churches: at Southwell the prebendaries were given pensions and the estates sold, while the church continued as the parish church on the petitions of the parishioners.

By an Act of Philip and Mary in 1557, the minster and its prebends were restored. In 1579 a set of statutes was promulgated by Queen Elizabeth I and the chapter operated under this constitution until it was dissolved in 1841. The Ecclesiastical Commissioners made provision for the abolition of the chapter as a whole; the death of each canon after this time resulted in the extinction of his prebend. The chapter came to its appointed end on 12 February 1873 with the death of Thomas Henry Shepherd, rector of Clayworth and prebendary of Beckingham.

=== Cathedral ===
Plans originating from August 1540 for Southwell Minster to be designated as a cathedral did not come to fruition until 1884, when it became a cathedral proper for Nottinghamshire and a part of Derbyshire including the city of Derby. The diocese of Southwell was divided in 1927 and the Diocese of Derby was formed. The diocese's centenary was commemorated by a royal visit to distribute Maundy money. George Ridding, the first Bishop of Southwell, designed and paid for the grant of Arms now used as the diocesan coat of arms.

== Architecture ==
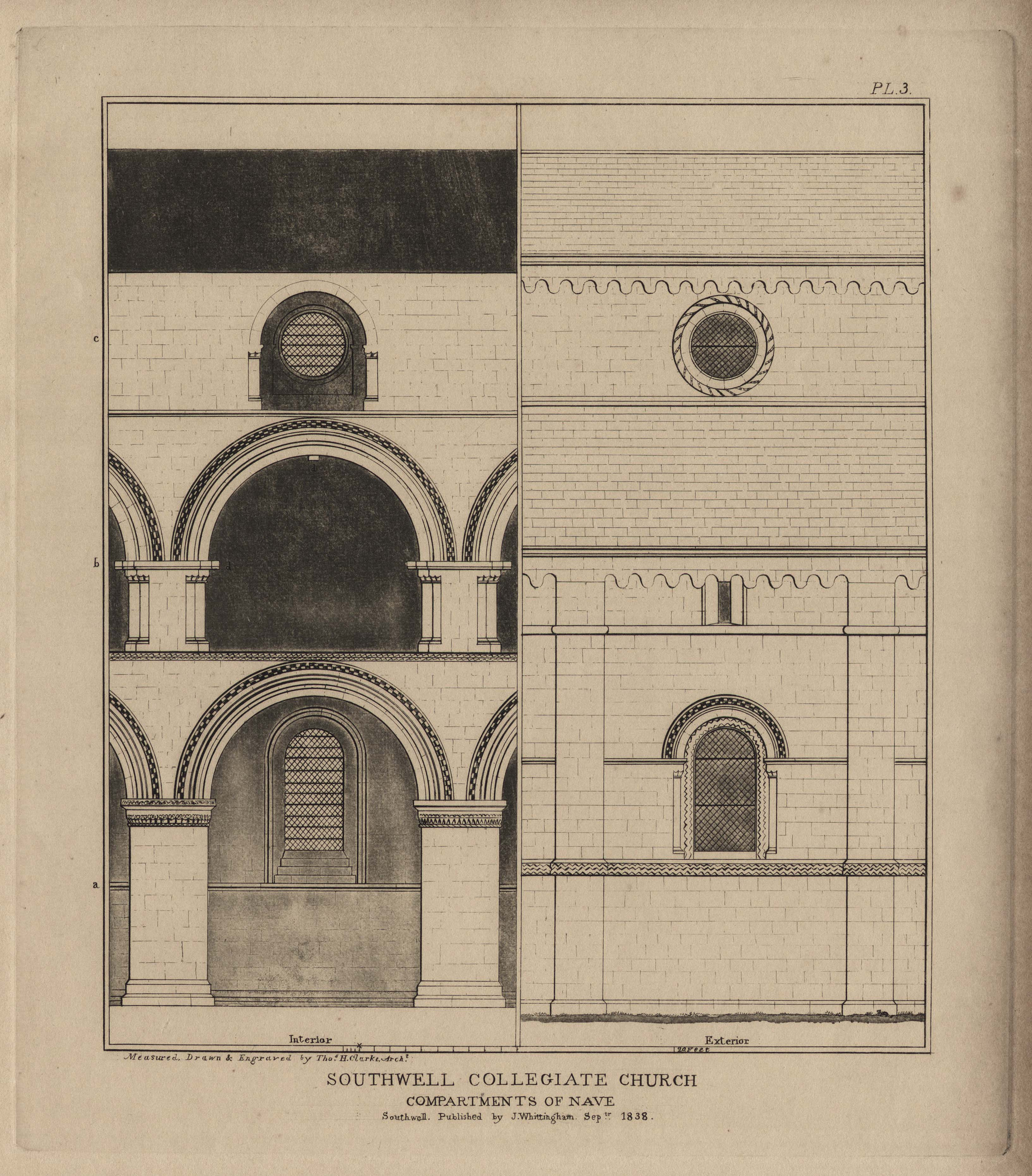
Compartments of the nave, interior and exterior

The nave, transepts, central tower and two western towers of the Norman church which replaced the Anglo-Saxon minster remain as an outstanding achievement of severe Romanesque design. With the exception of fragments mentioned above, they are the oldest part of the existing church.

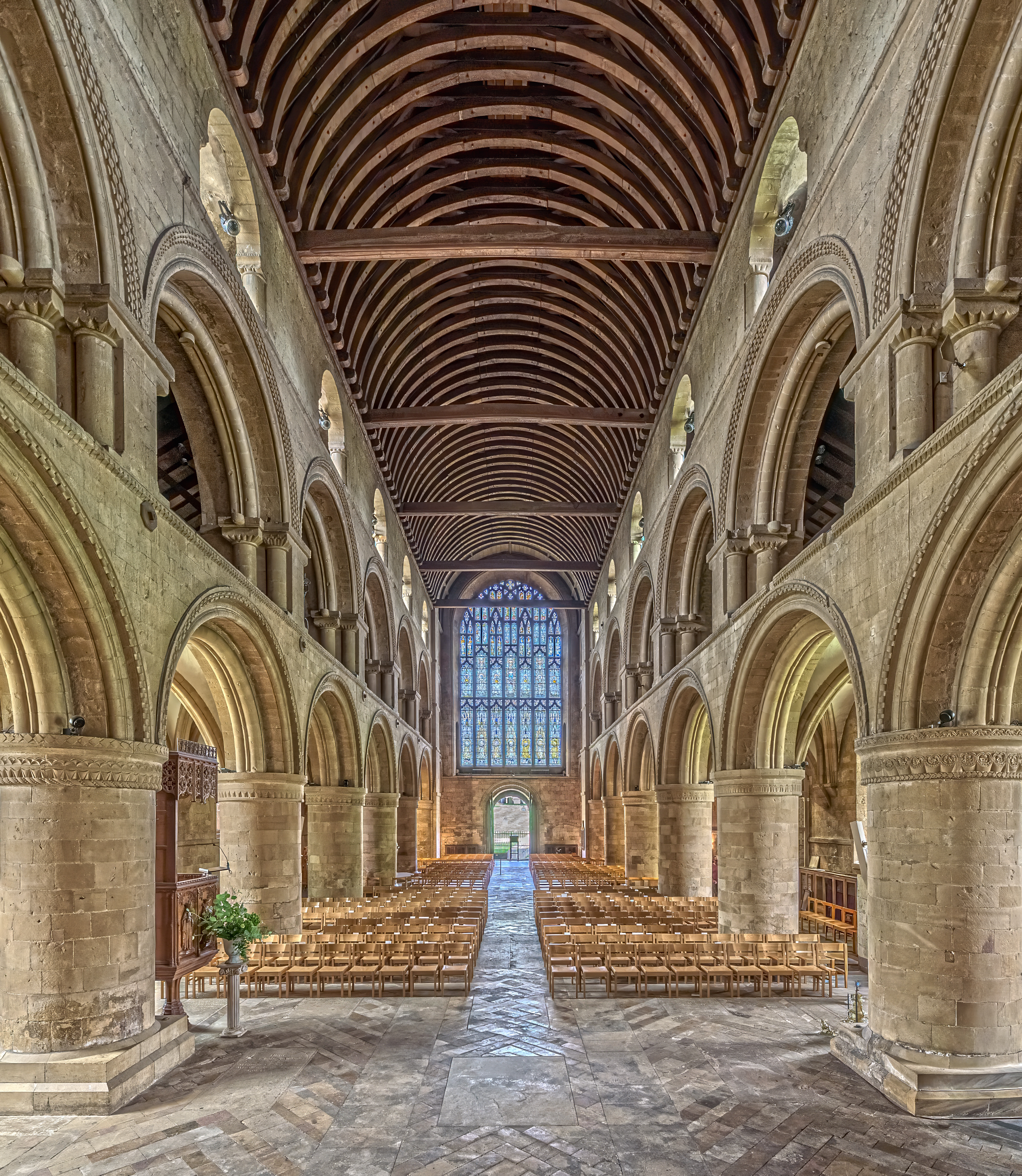
The Nave, facing east

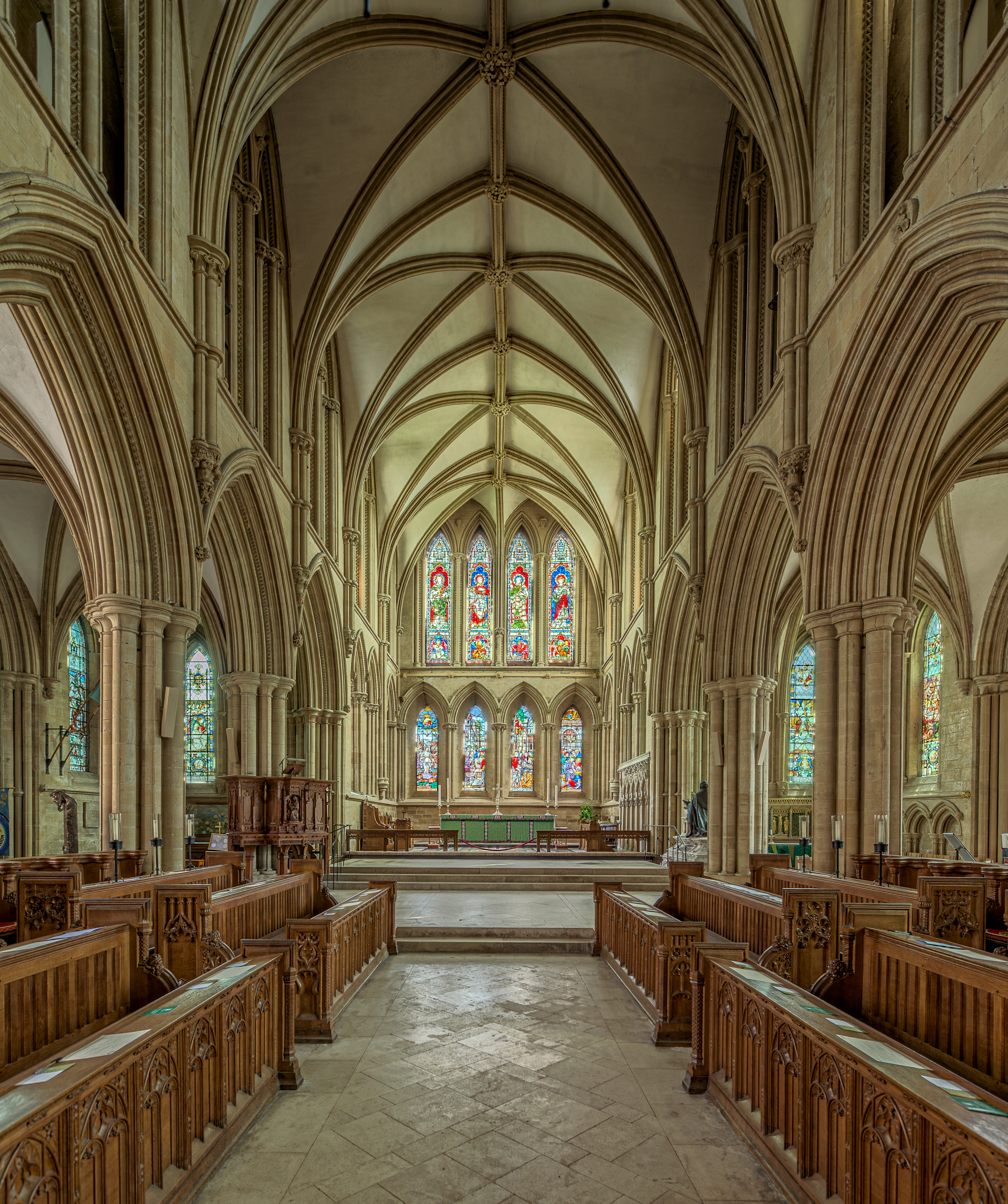
The Choir

The nave is of seven bays, plus a separated western bay. The columns of the arcade are short and circular, with small scalloped capitals. The triforium has a single large arch in each bay. The clerestory has small round-headed windows. The external window openings are circular. There is a tunnel-vaulted passage between the inside and outside window openings of the clerestory. The nave aisles are vaulted, the main roof of the nave is a trussed rafter roof, with tie-beams between each bay – a late 19th-century replacement.

By contrast with the nave arcade, the arches of the crossing are tall, rising to nearly the full height of the nave walls. The capitals of the east crossing piers depict scenes from the life of Jesus. Two stages of the inside of the central tower can be seen at the crossing, with cable and wave decoration on the lower order and zigzag on the upper. The transepts have three stories with semi-circular arches, like the nave, but without aisles.

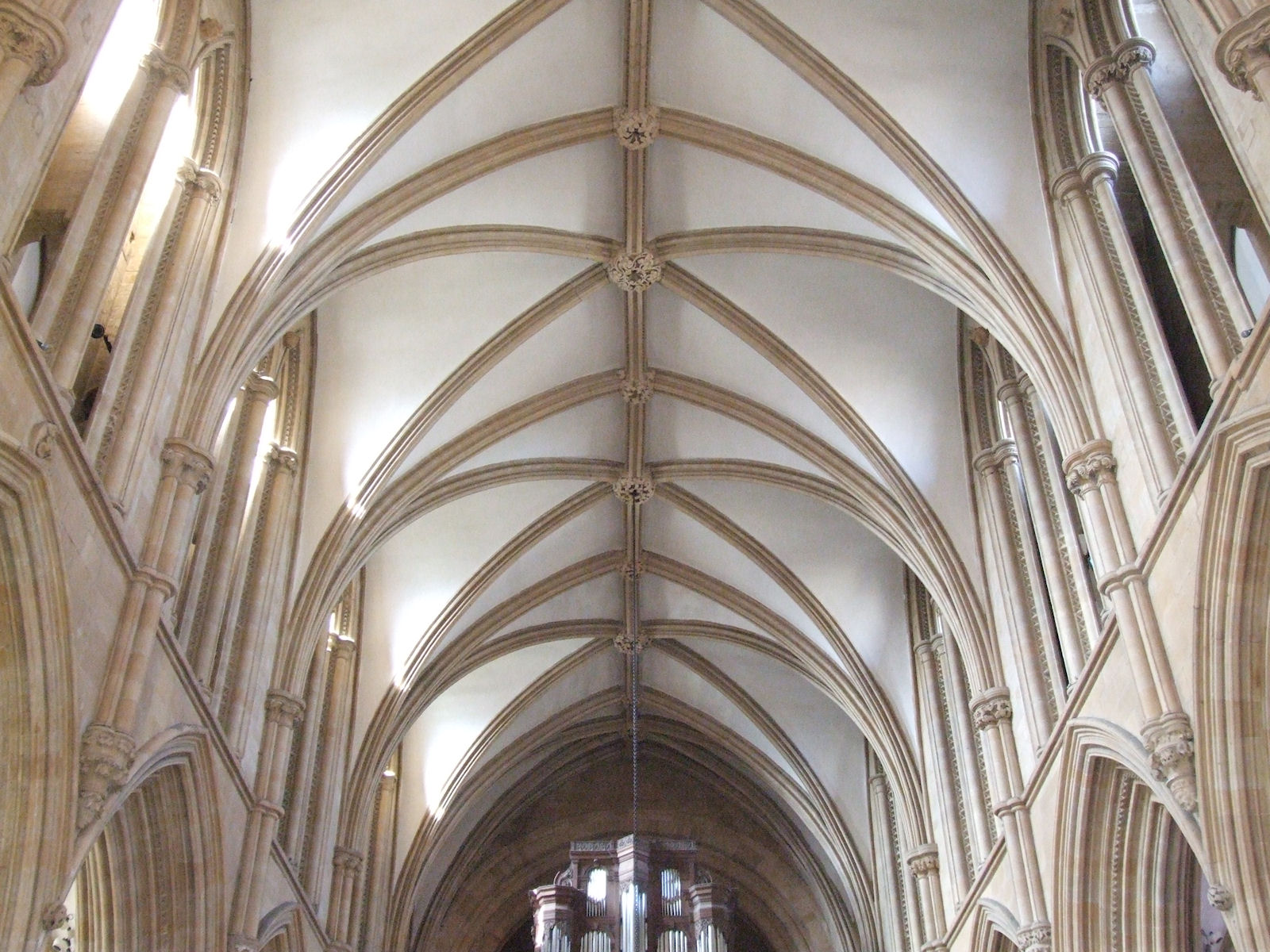
Rib vault of Southwell Minster choir

The western facade has pyramidal spires on its towers – a unique feature today, though common in the 12th century. The existing spires date only from 1880, but they replace those destroyed by fire in 1711, which are documented in old illustrations. The large west window dates from the 15th century. The central tower's two ornamental stages place it high among England's surviving Norman towers. The lower order has intersecting arches, the upper order plain arches. The north porch has a tunnel vault, and is decorated with intersecting arches.

The choir is Early English in style, and was completed in 1241. It has transepts, thus separating the choir into a western and eastern arm. The choir is of two storeys, with no gallery or triforium. The lower storey has clustered columns with multiform pointed arches, the upper storey has twin lancet arches in each bay. The rib vault of the choir springs from clustered shafts which rest on corbels. The vault has ridge ribs. The square east end of the choir has two stories each of four lancet windows.

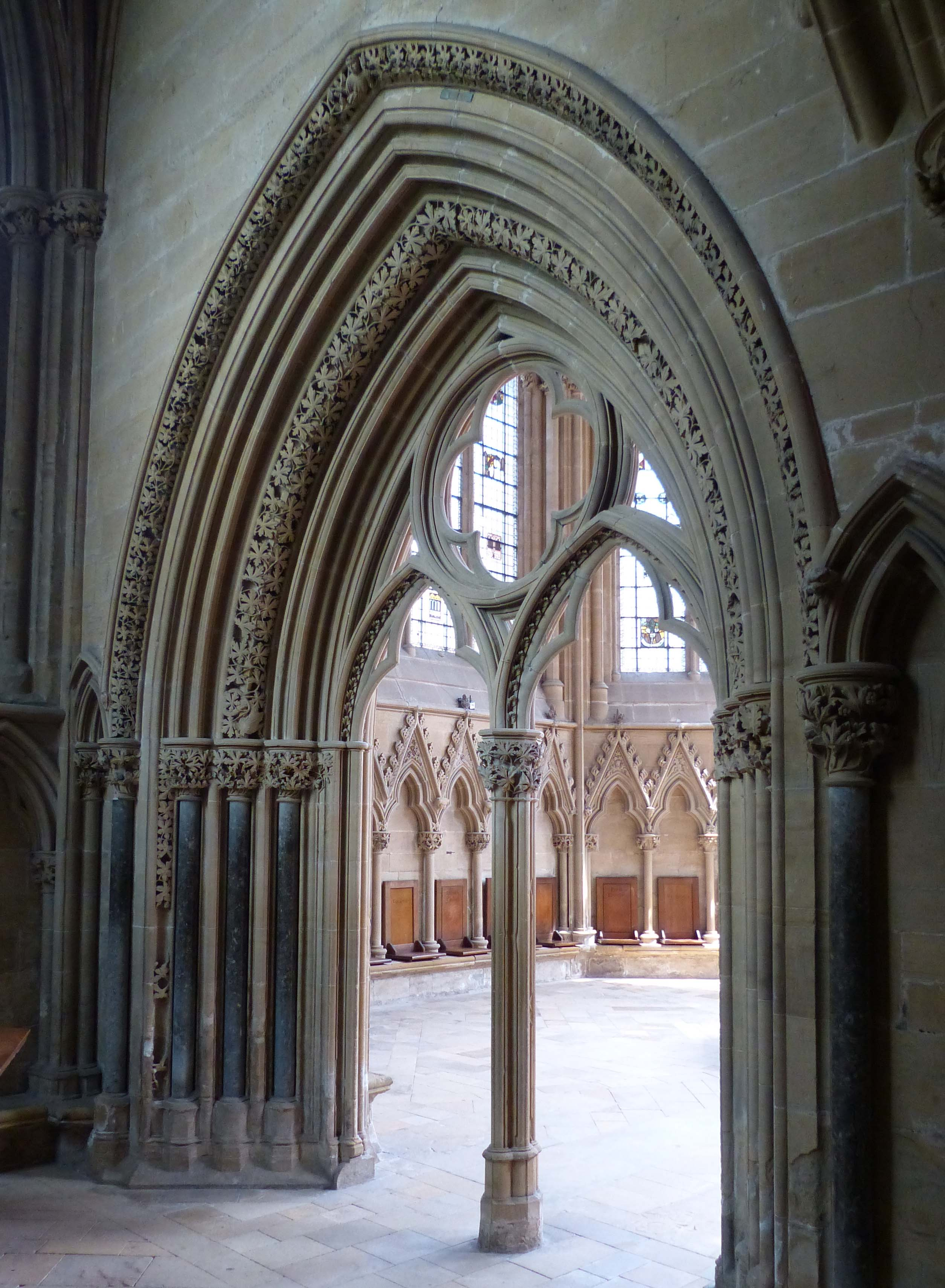
Entrance portal of the chapter house with the famous carved foliage

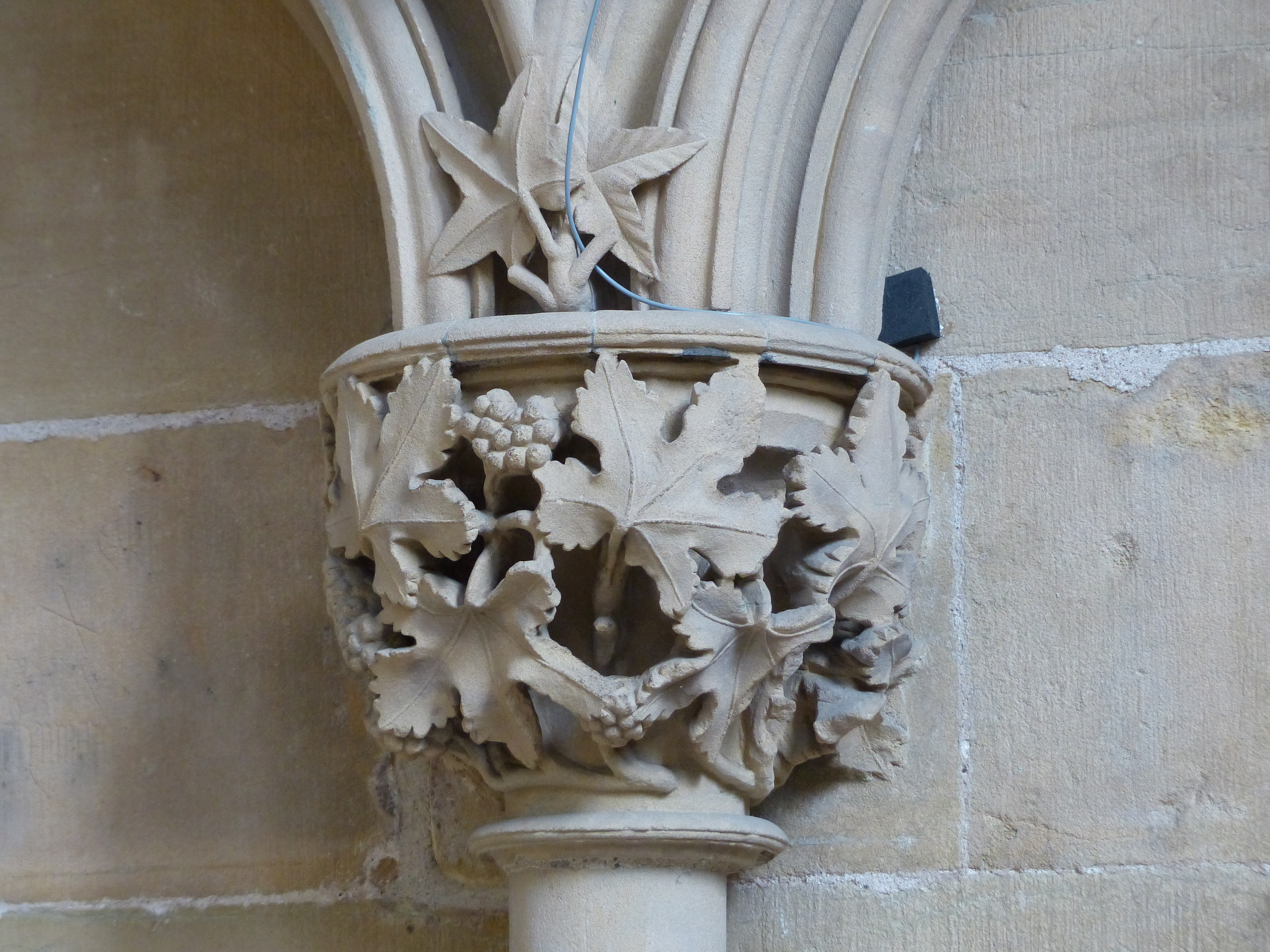
Chapter house capital with carving of hops

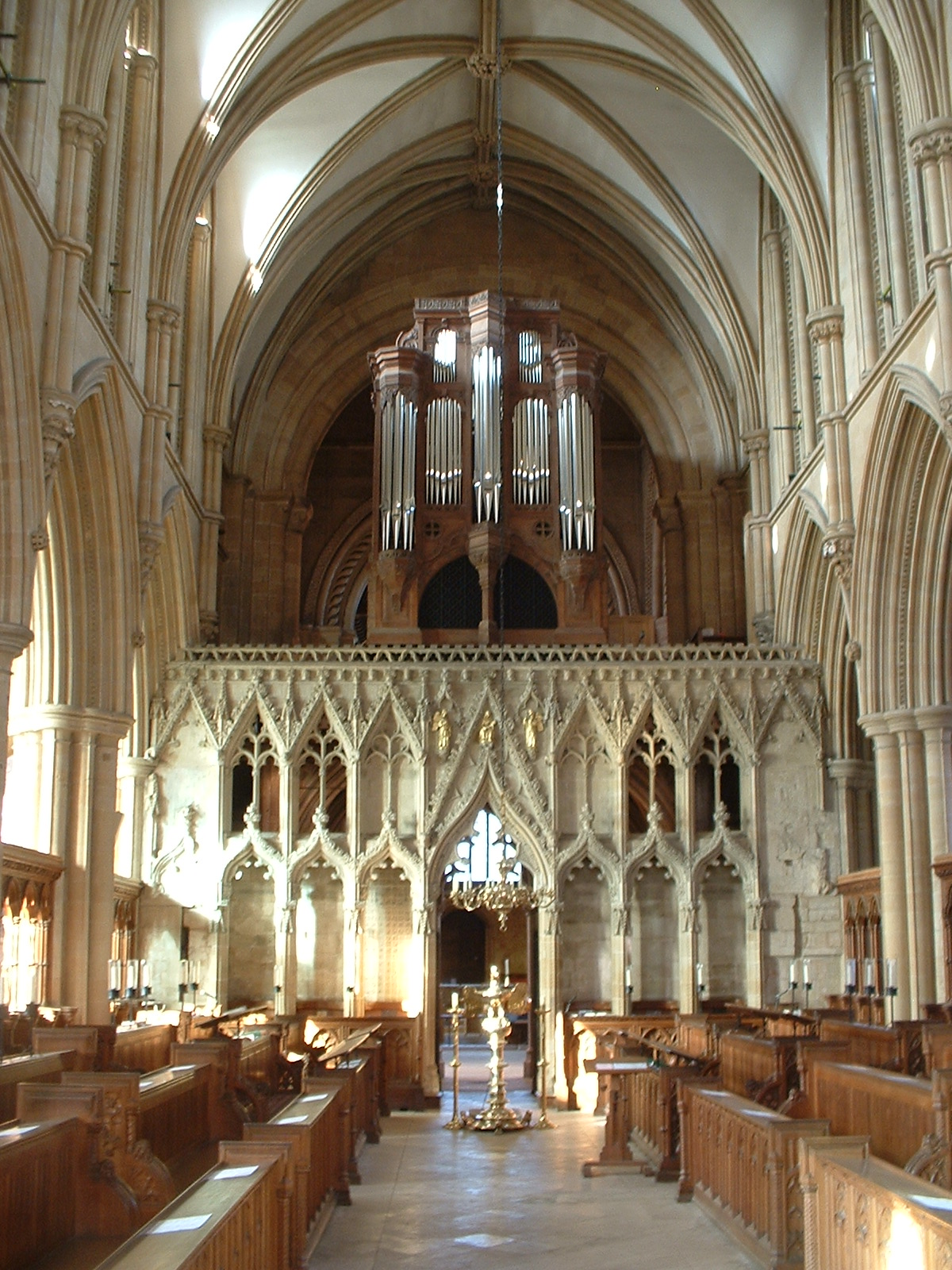
Southwell rood screen (pulpitum) from the choir

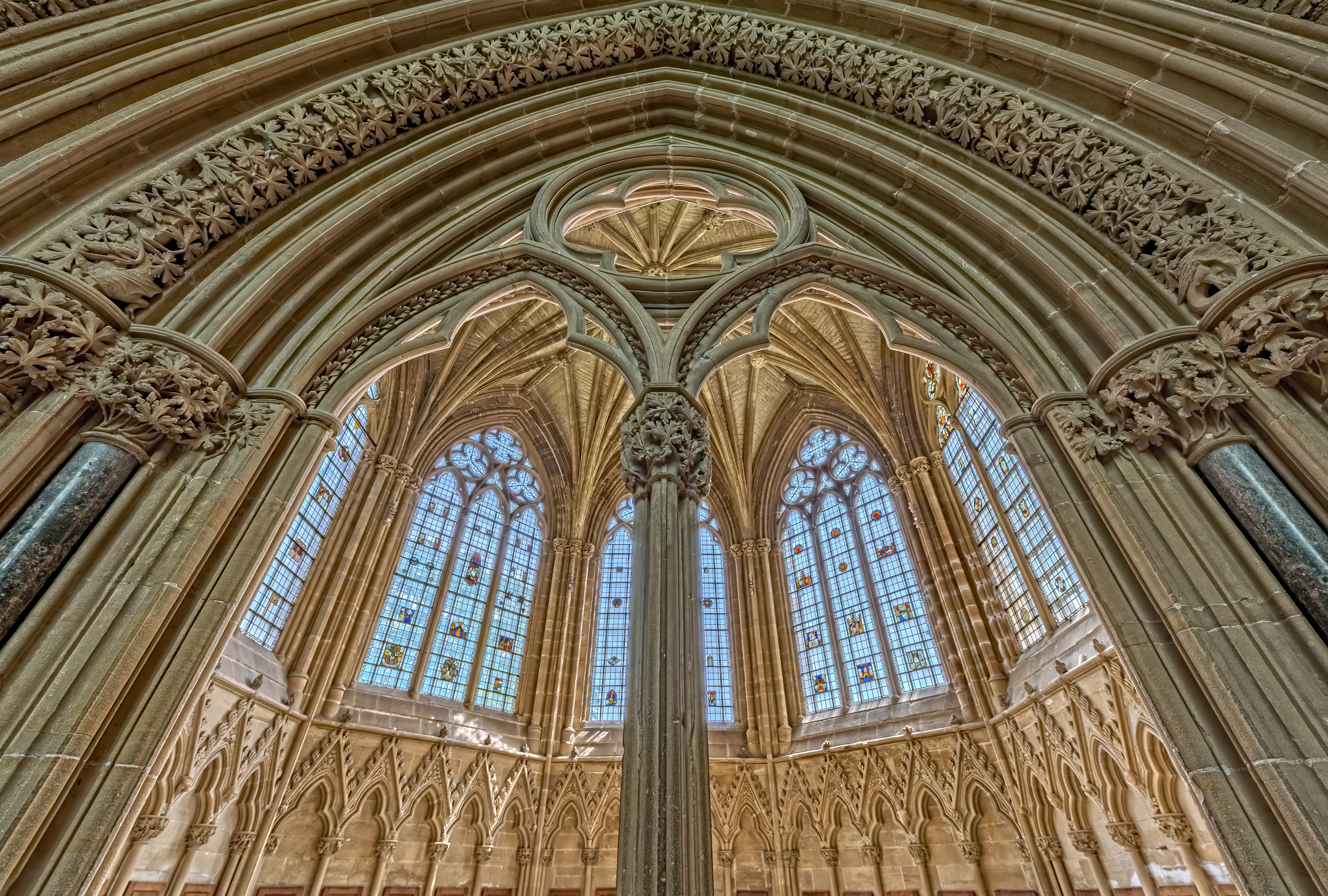
The Chapter House entrance

In the 14th century the chapter house and the choir screen were added. The chapter house, started in 1288, is in an early decorated style, octagonal, with no central pier. It is reached from the choir by a passage and vestibule, through an entrance portal. This portal has five orders, and is divided by a central shaft into two subsidiary arches with a circle with quatrefoil above. Inside the chapter house, the stalls fill the octagonal wall sections, each separated by a single shaft with a triangular canopy above. The windows are of three lights, above them two circles with trefoils and above that a single circle with quatrefoil. This straightforward description gives no indication of the glorious impression, noted by so many writers, of the elegant proportions of the space, and of the profusion (in vestibule and passage, not just in the chapter house) of exquisitely carved capitals and tympana, mostly representing leaves in a highly naturalistic and detailed representation. The capitals in particular are deeply undercut, adding to the feeling of realism. Individual plant species such as ivy, maple, oak, hop, hawthorn can often be identified. The botanist Albert Seward published a detailed description of the carvings and their identification in 1935 and Nikolaus Pevsner wrote the classic description entitled The Leaves of Southwell, with photographs by Frederick Attenborough, in 1945.

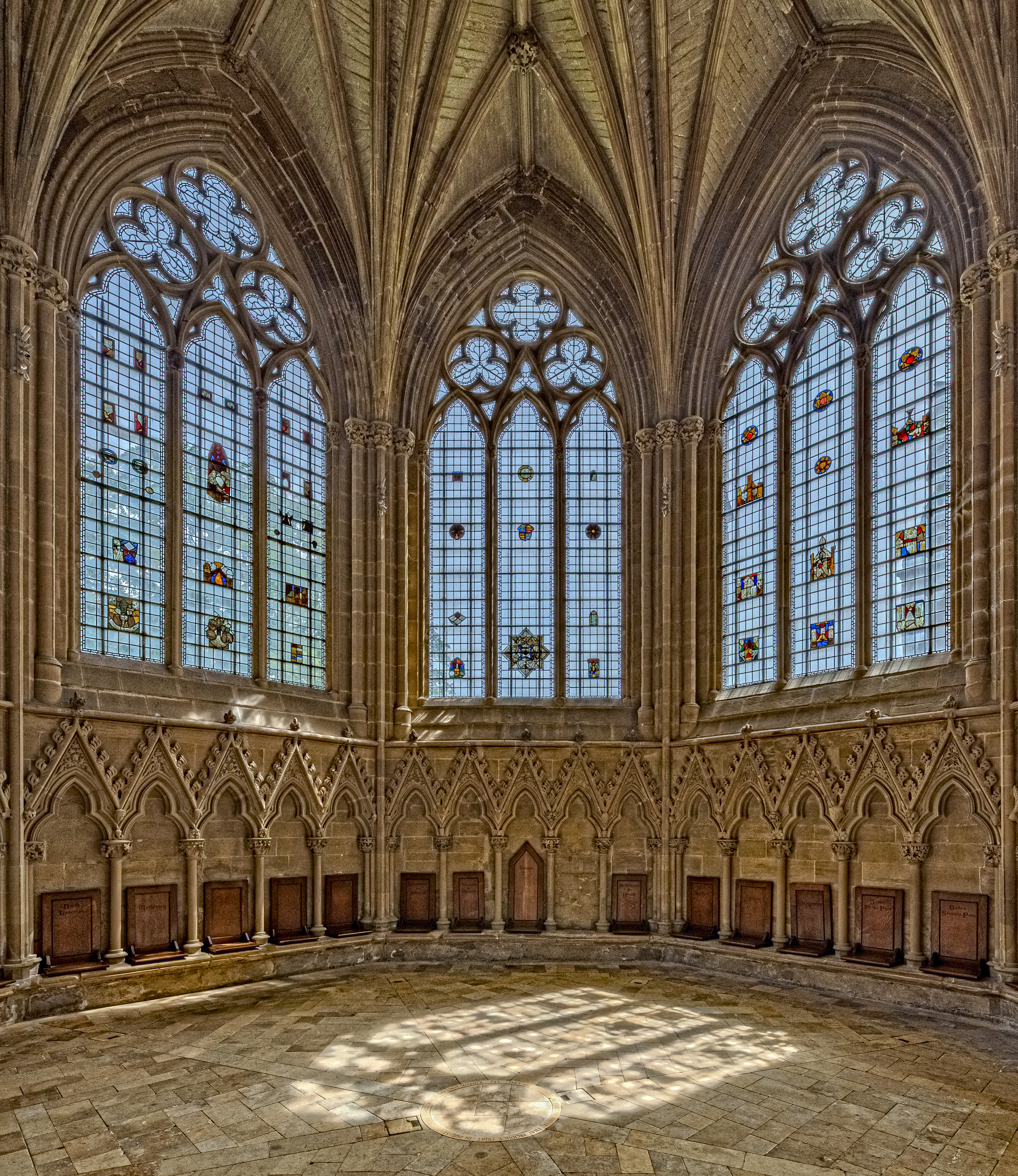
Inside the Chapter House

The rood screen dates from 1320 to 1340, and is an outstanding example of the Decorated style. It has an east and west facade, separated by a vaulted space with flying ribs. The east facade, of two storeys, is particularly richly decorated, with niches on the lower storey with ogee arches, and openwork gables on the upper storey. The central archway rises higher than the lower storey, with an ogee arch surmounted by a cusped gable.

The finest memorial in the minster is the alabaster tomb of Edwin Sandys, Archbishop of York (died 1588).

== Stained glass ==
The best old glass was made by the 16th-century French stained glass artist Jean Chastellain from designs by the Noël Bellemare for the Temple Church in Paris and given to the Minster in 1818. These are the four lower panels of the East window representing four scenes from the life of Christ, while above are the four evangelists by Clayton & Bell from 1876. Other 19th-century glass includes work by Kempe & Co, notably the Archangels Gabriel, Michael and Raphael in the south aisle and scenes from the life of the Virgin Mary in St Thomas' Chapel. The highlight is the great Angel Window at the West end by Patrick Reyntiens installed in 1996. The artist described it as “a great gathering of angels enjoying being with God, just all joy and worship”

== Clock and chimes ==
The carillon machine was given in 1693 by Thomas Wymondesold of Lambeth. It was badly damaged in the fire of 1711 but was later rebuilt. A 30-hour clock was installed in 1827 by Moore and Co of Clerkenwell. This was replaced by a new clock installed in 1896 by J. B. Joyce & Co of Whitchurch. The main wheel of the striking and quarter chimes was 18 inches (0.46 m) in diameter and the going wheel 15 inches (0.38 m) in diameter. The escapement was Grimthorpe’s double three-legged gravity, and the pendulum was compensated with tubes of zinc and iron, with a beat of 1¼ seconds. The pendulum bob weighed 2 cwt. A new skeleton dial was provided and the mechanism connected to the old chimes, which stood some distance from the mechanism. The whole installation cost £250 (equivalent to £28,800 in 2025). The clock and the carillon were converted to electric drive in 1957.

== Staff ==
=== Dean and chapter ===
As of 6 January 2025:

- Dean — Stephen Evans
- Canon Chancellor – position vacant
- Canon Precentor – Richard Frith (since 8 September 2019)
- Acting Canon Missioner - Amanda Lees (since 6 January 2025)
- Acting Canon Pastor - Stephen Hippisley-Cox (since 6 January 2025)

=== Other clergy ===
- Priest Vicar and Canon Theologian (honorary canon) — Alison Milbank
- Priest Vicar – David McCollough
- Priest Vicar – Erika Kirk

=== Lay staff ===
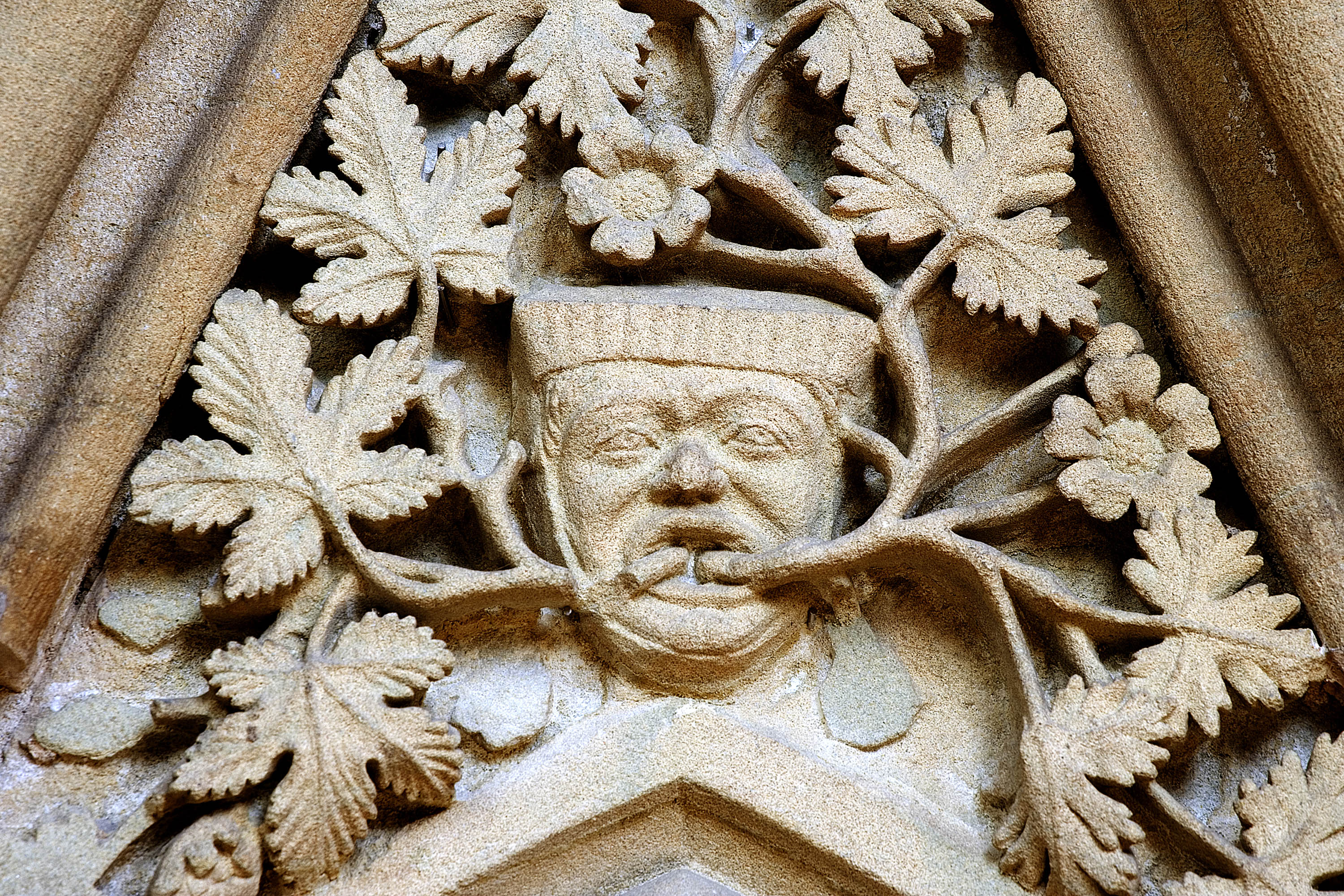
'Green Man' amidst the 'Leaves of Southwell'

- Rector Chori & Organist – Paul Provost
- Assistant Director of Music – Jonathan Allsopp
- Organ Scholar – Nathan Monk
- Head Verger – Andy McIntosh

== Music and liturgy ==
=== Choirs ===
The Cathedral Choir

The Cathedral Choir comprises the boy choristers, girl choristers, and lay clerks who, between them, provide music for seven choral services each week during school terms. The boys and girl choristers usually sing as separate groups, combining for particularly important occasions such as Christmas and Easter services, and notable events in the life of the minster. Regular concerts and international tours are a feature of the choir's work.

Services have been sung in Southwell Minster for centuries, and the tradition of daily choral worship continues to thrive. There was originally a college of vicars choral who took the lead as singers, one or two of whom were known as rector chori, or 'ruler of the choir'. The vicars choral lived in accommodation where Vicars Court now stands, and lived a collegiate lifestyle.

The current Cathedral Choir owes its form to the addition of boy choristers to the vicars choral, and the vicars themselves eventually being replaced by lay singers, known as lay clerks. For a large period of time, the format remained very similar – a number of boy choristers singing with a mixture of lay clerks and vicars choral, slowly becoming a group of entirely lay singers. Eventually, in 2005, a girls’ choir was started by the Assistant Director of Music, who have now been formally admitted as girl choristers.

All of the choristers are educated at the Minster School, a Church of England academy with a music-specialist Junior Department (years 3–6) for choristers and other talented young musicians.

The Cathedral Choir has recorded and broadcast extensively over the years. Regular concerts and international tours are a feature of the choir's work, alongside more local events such as civic services and the annual Four Choirs’ Evensong together with the cathedral choirs of Derby, Leicester and Coventry.

The Minster Chorale

Southwell Minster Chorale is Southwell Minster's auditioned adult voluntary choir, and is directed by the Minster's Assistant Director of Music, Jonathan Allsopp. Founded in 1994, the Chorale's purpose is to regularly sing for services, especially at times when the Cathedral Choir is not available. In particular, the Chorale sings for:

– Evening Sung Eucharists (All Souls, Epiphany, Ash Wednesday etc.)

– A full Sunday during each half term

– The Fourth Sunday of Advent, and the Fifth Sunday of Lent

– Midnight Mass on Christmas Eve

– The Chorale also sings regularly for the monthly Sunday Mattins.

In addition to its regular round of services, one of the highlights of the Chorale's year is its annual performance of Handel's Messiah in the run-up to Christmas; this concert is a staple of the Minster's Christmas programme.

The Chorale also regularly goes on tour; in recent years they have toured to the Channel Islands and the Scilly Isles. A 2020 tour to Schwerin, Germany was planned (together with Lincoln Cathedral Consort), but this was cancelled due to the Coronavirus pandemic. The Chorale also visits other cathedrals to sing services.

=== List of rectores chori ===
- Lawrence Pepys 1499
- George Vincent 1519
- George Thetford 1568
- John Mudd 1582
- Thomas Foster 1584
- William Colbecke 1586
- John Beeston 1594
- Edward Manestie 1596
- Francis Dogson 1622
- John Hutchinson 1628
- Edward Chappell 1661
- George Chappell 1690
- William Popeley 1699
- William Lee 1718–1754
- Samuel Wise 1754–1755
- Edmund Ayrton 1755–1764
- Thomas Spofforth 1764–1818
- Edward Heathcote 1818–1835
- Frederick Gunton 1835–1841
- Chappell Batchelor 1841–1857
- Herbert Stephen Irons 1857–1872
- Cedric Bucknall 1872–1876
- William Weaver Ringrose 1876–1879
- W Arthur Marriott 1879–1888
- Robert William Liddle 1888–1918
- Harry William Tupper 1918–1929
- George Thomas Francis 1929–1946
- Robert James Ashfield 1946–1956
- David James Lumsden 1956–1959
- Kenneth Bernard Beard 1959–1989
- Paul Hale 1989–2016
- Paul Provost Apr 2017–

To see the list of organists, assistant directors of music and organ scholars, see the list of musicians at English cathedrals.

=== Southwell Music Festival ===
The minster is also home to the annual Southwell Music Festival, held in late August.

== Image gallery ==
=== Ground plans of the minster ===
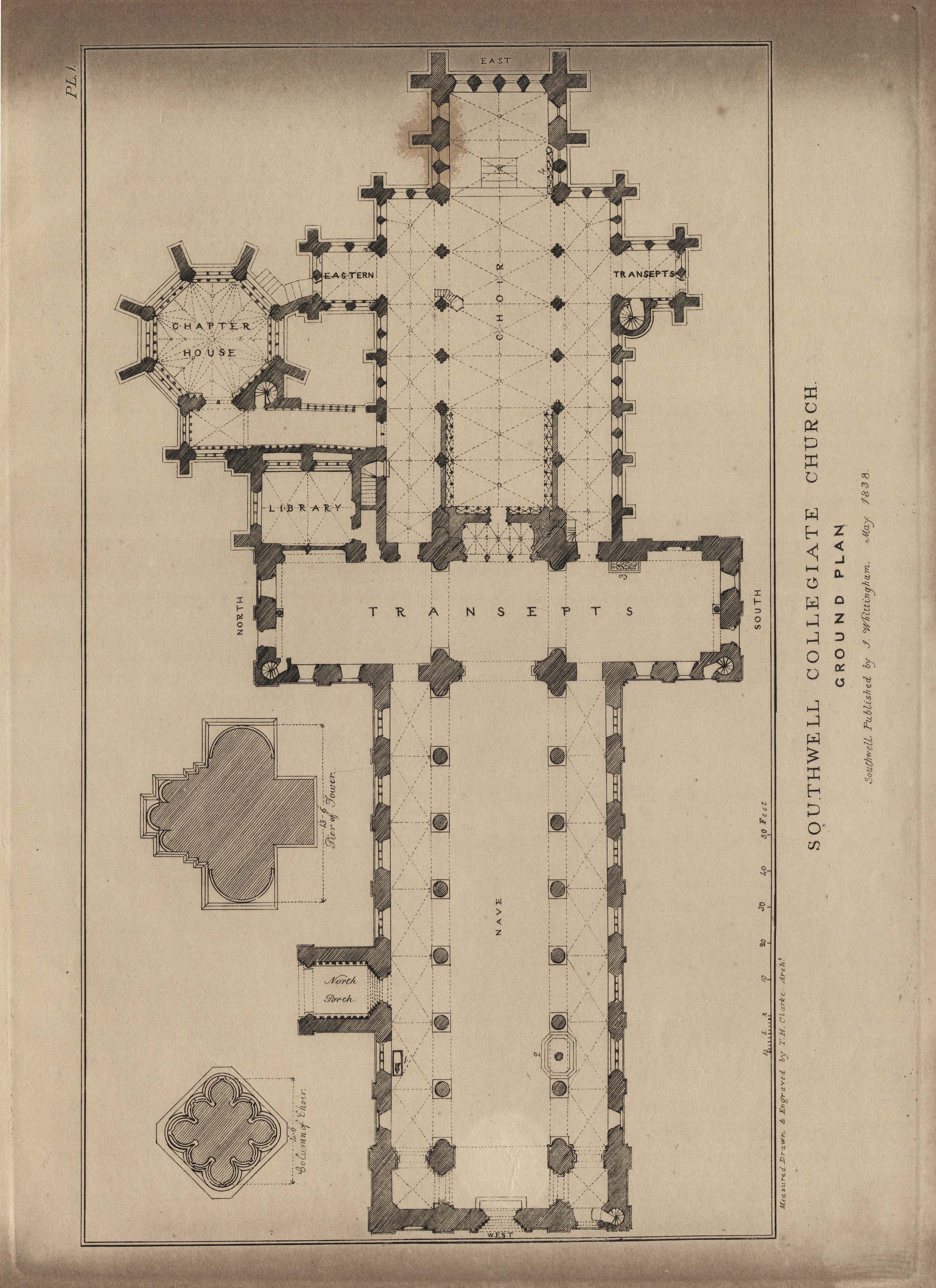
Plan of the minster 1839

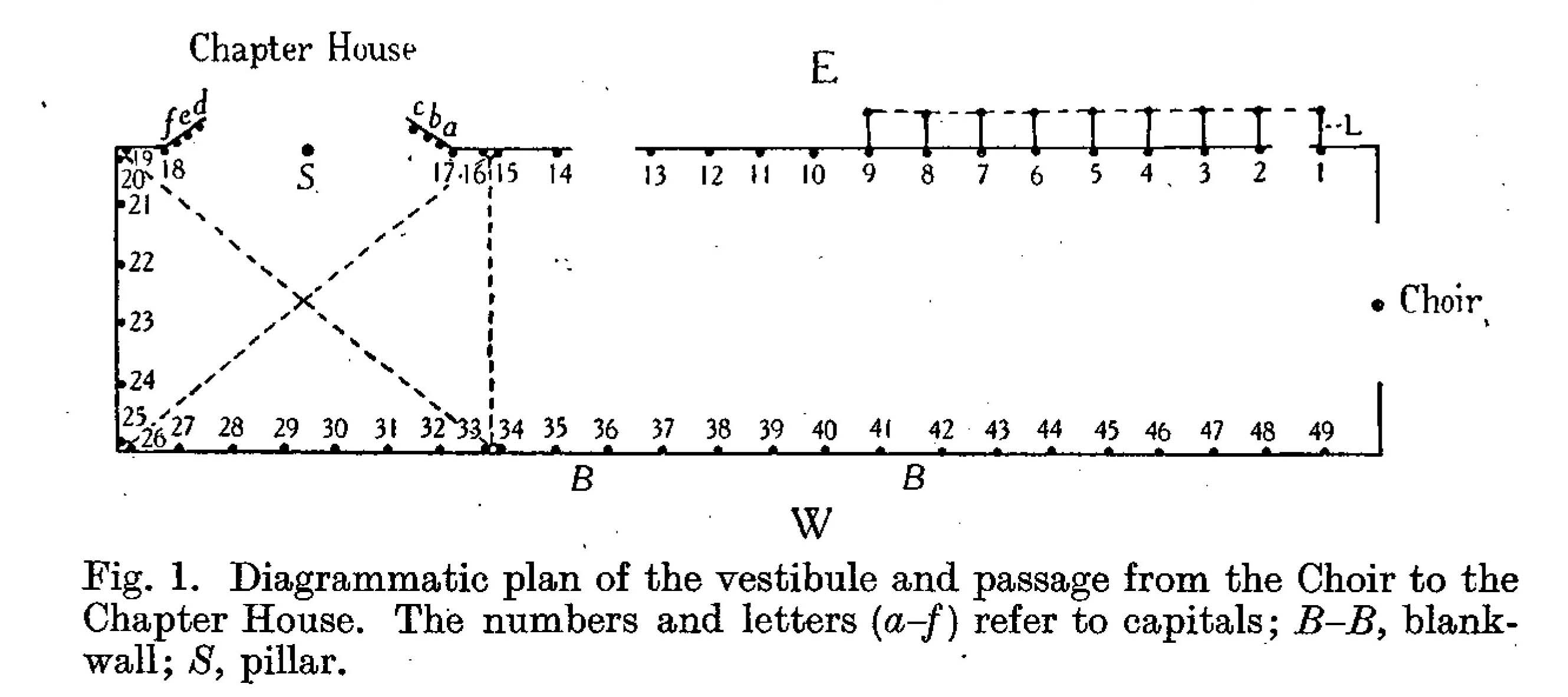
Plan of vestibule and passage to the chapter house

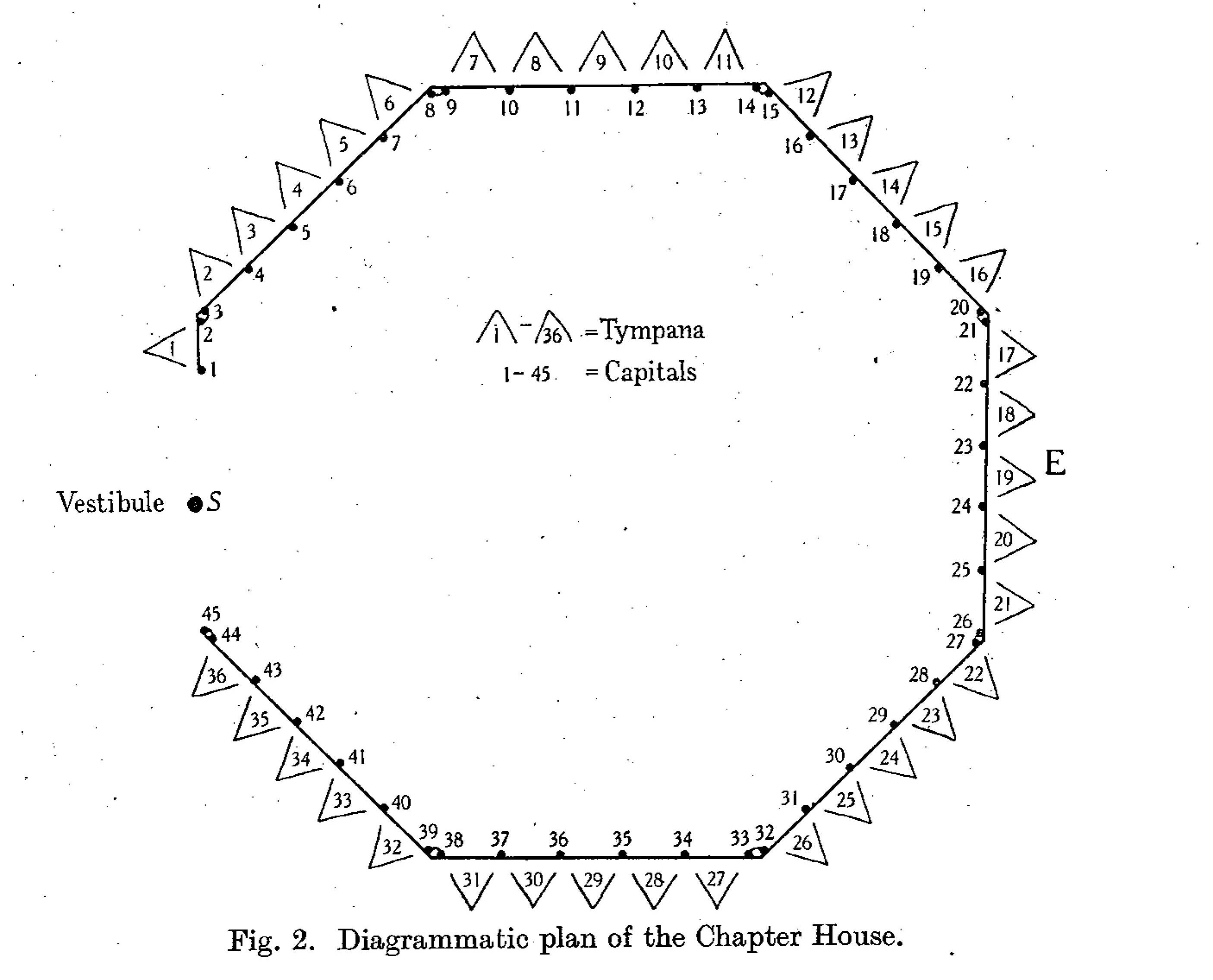
Plan of the chapter house

=== Exterior ===
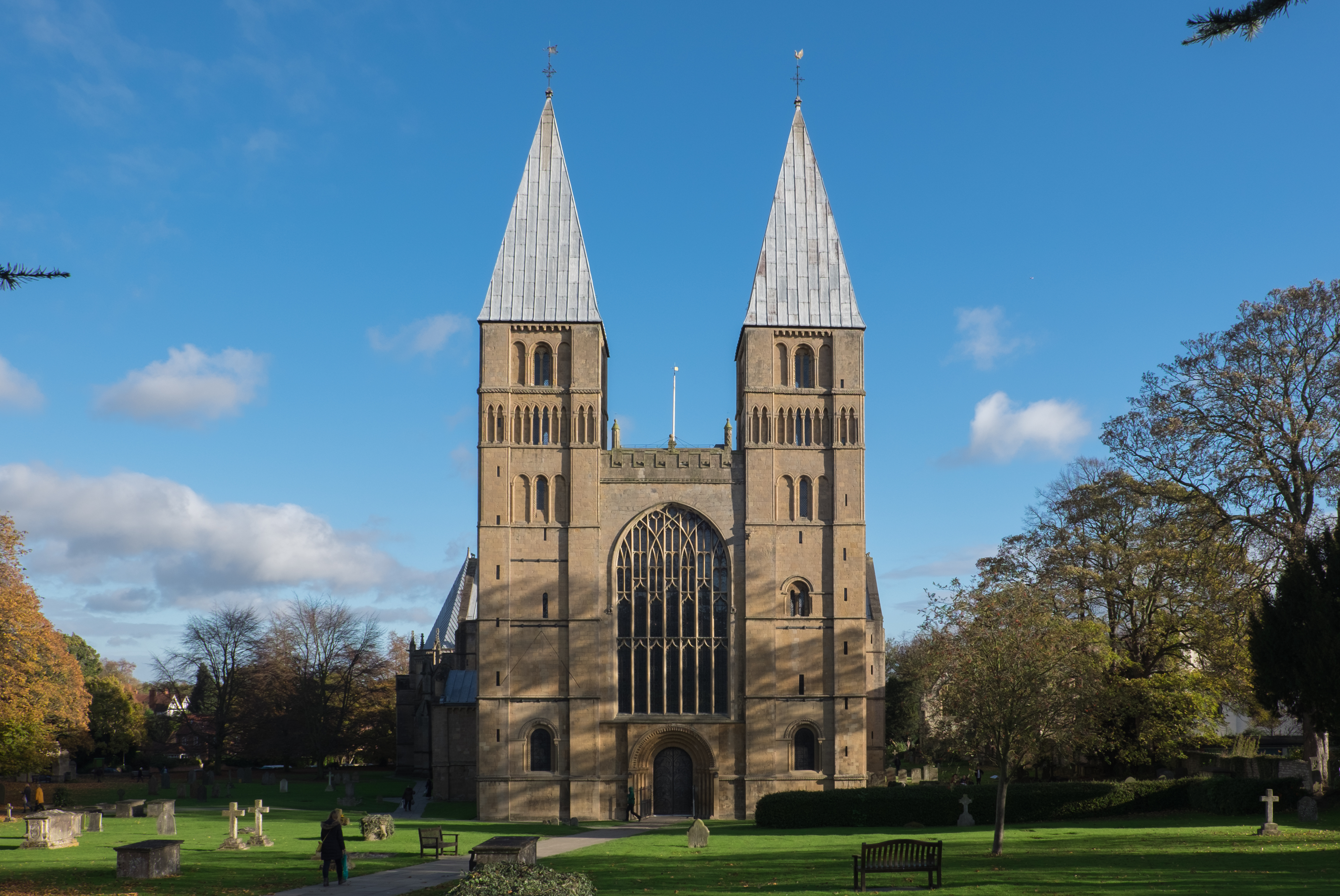
The west front

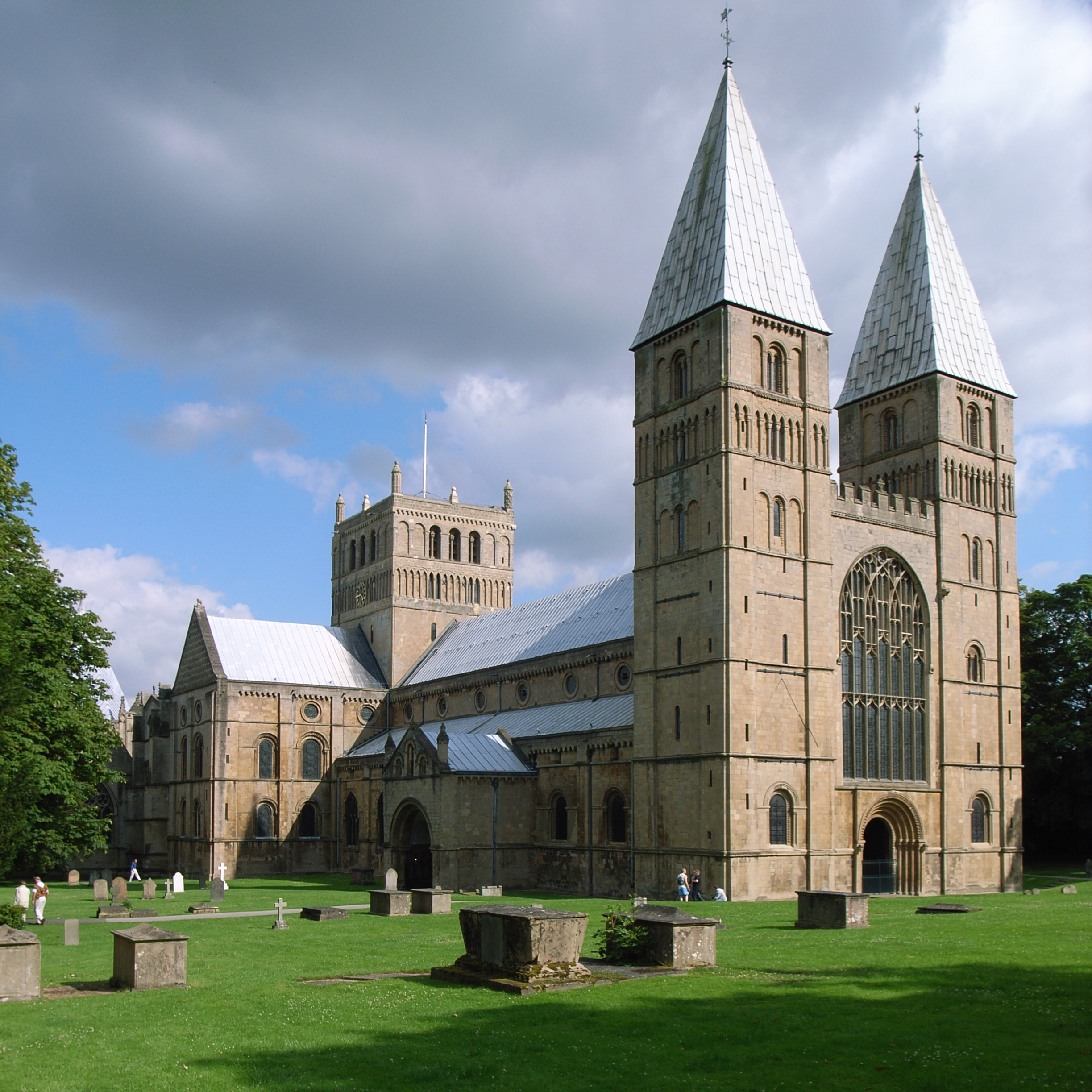
The minster from the north-west

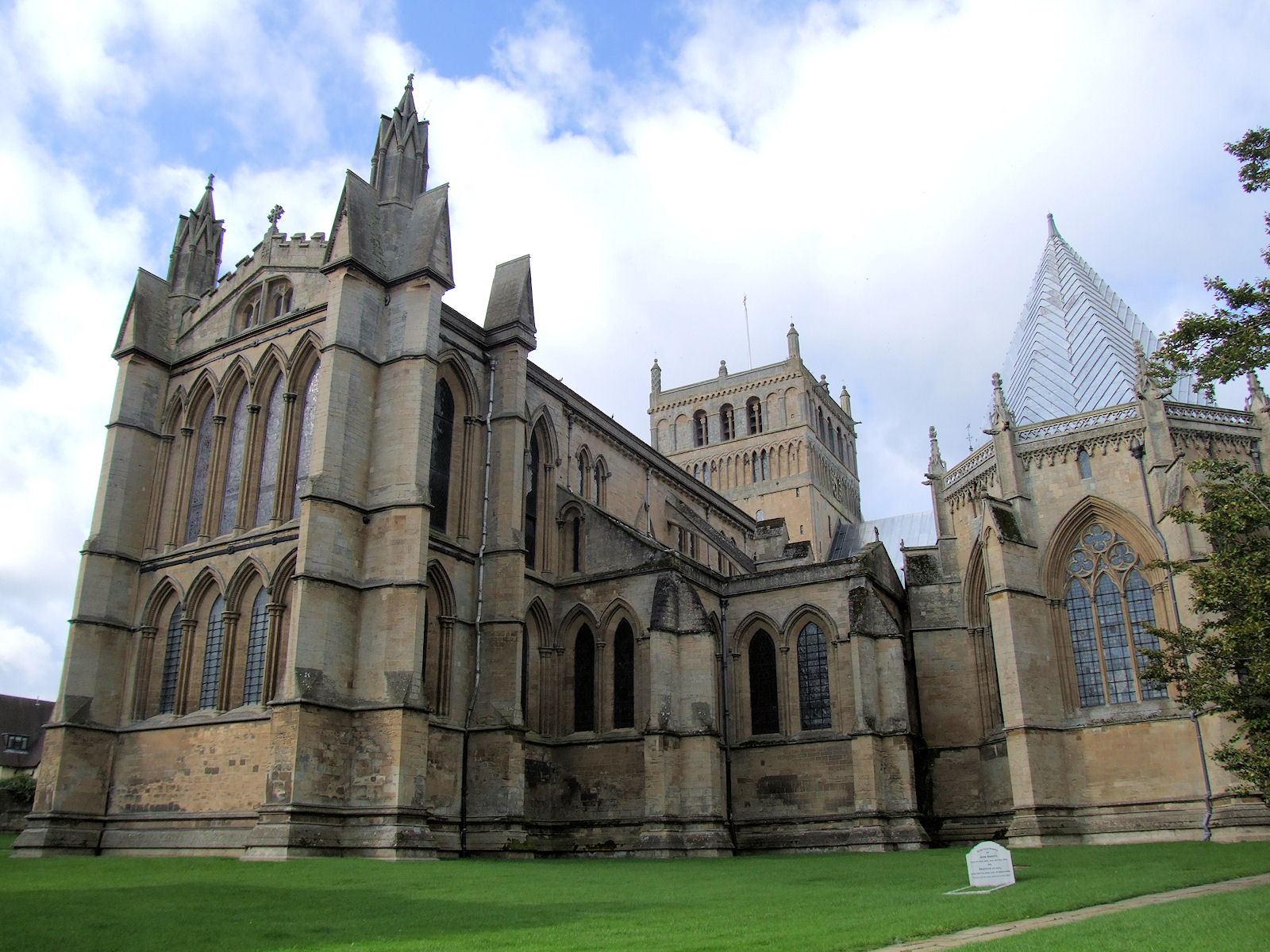
The minster from the north-east

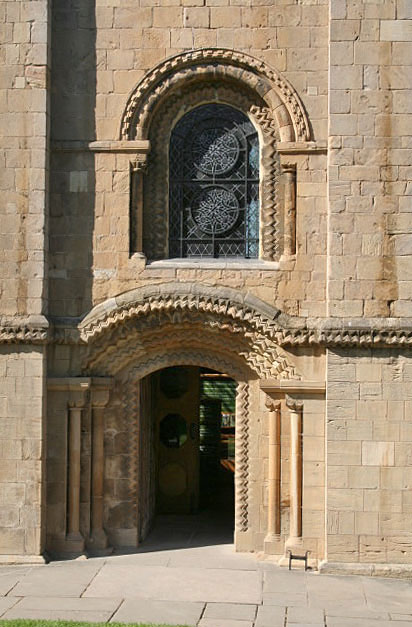
Door of south transept

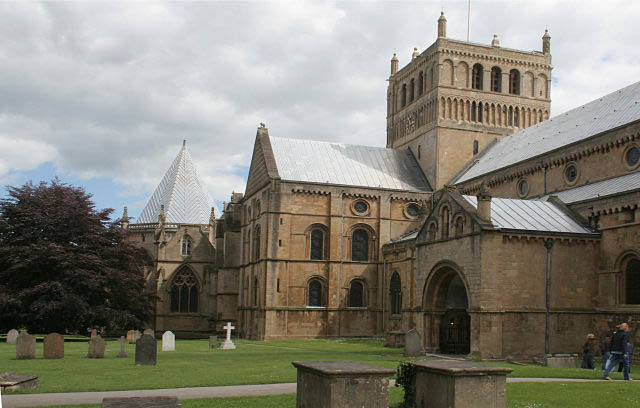
Central tower, north transept, north porch, and chapter house

=== Nave and transepts ===
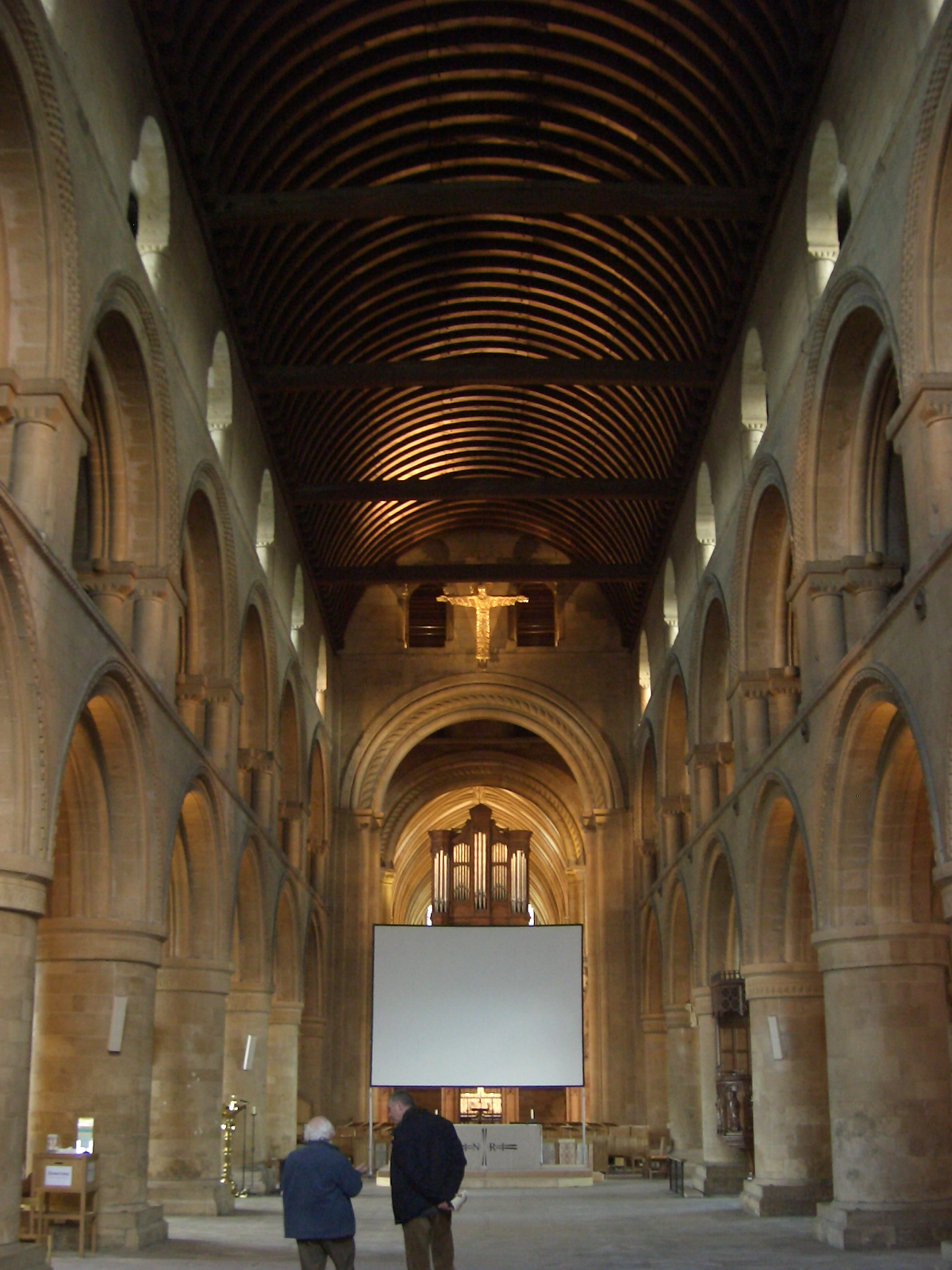
The Norman nave, built in the early 12th century

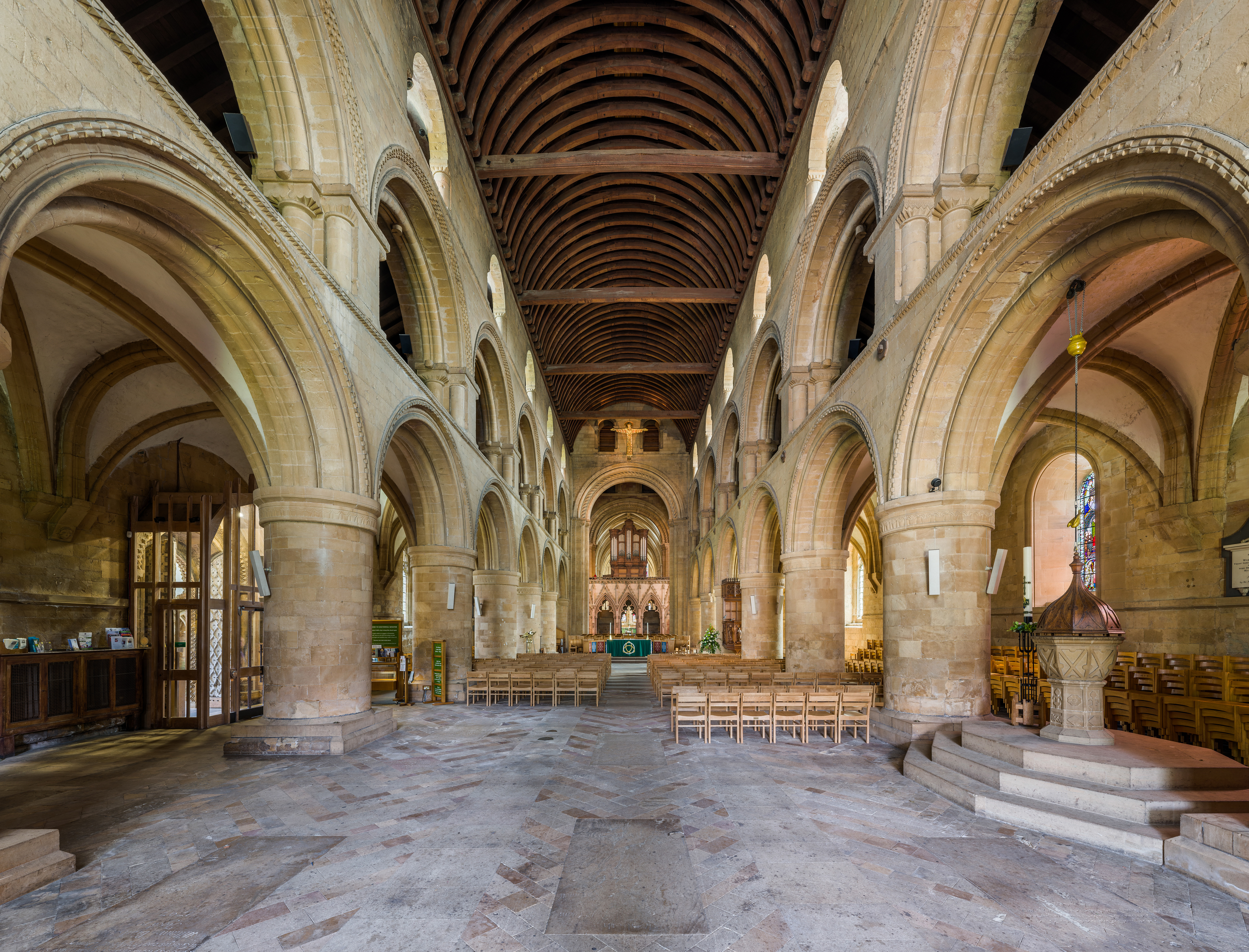
Nave with the font on the right side

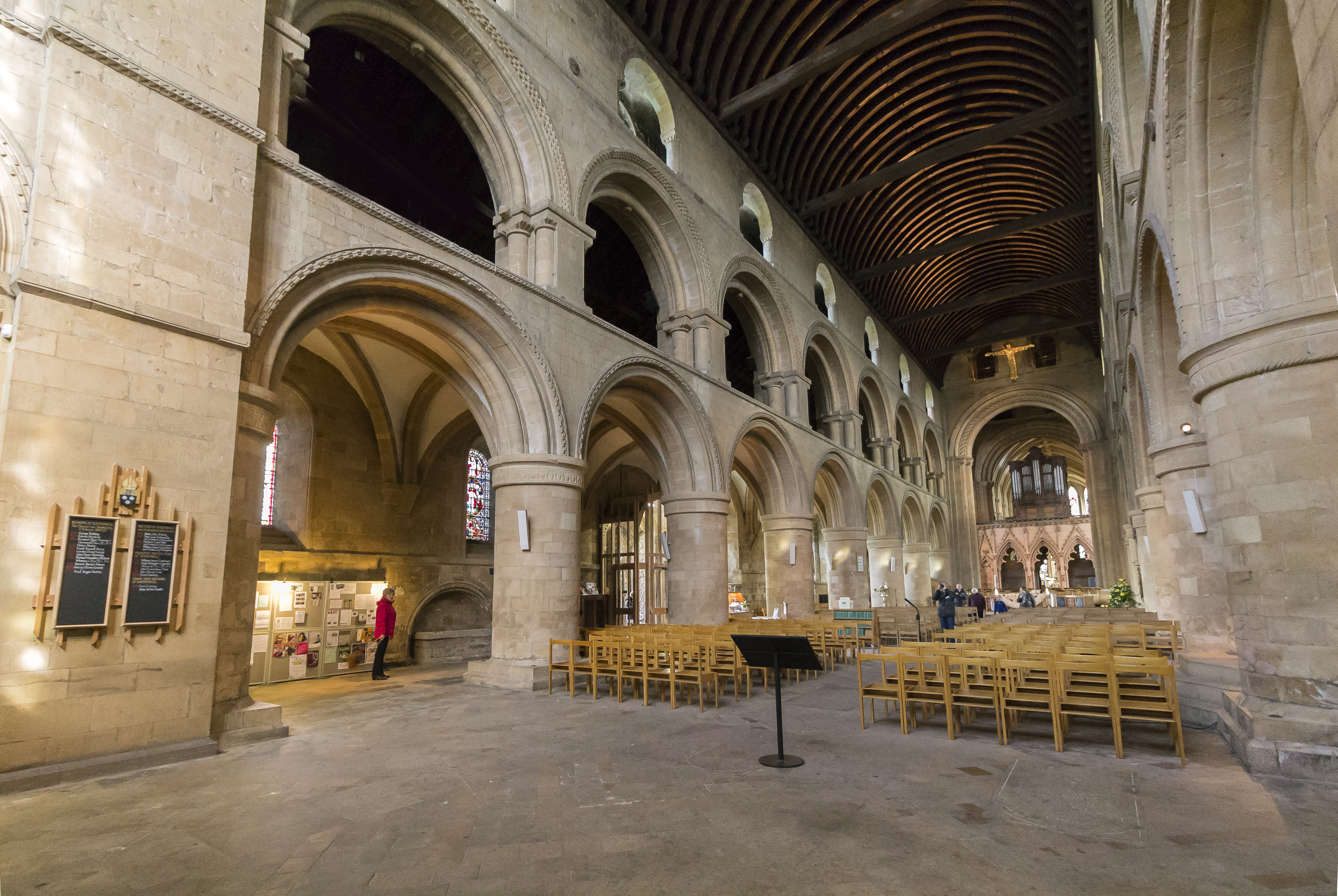
Nave of the minster

=== Choir ===
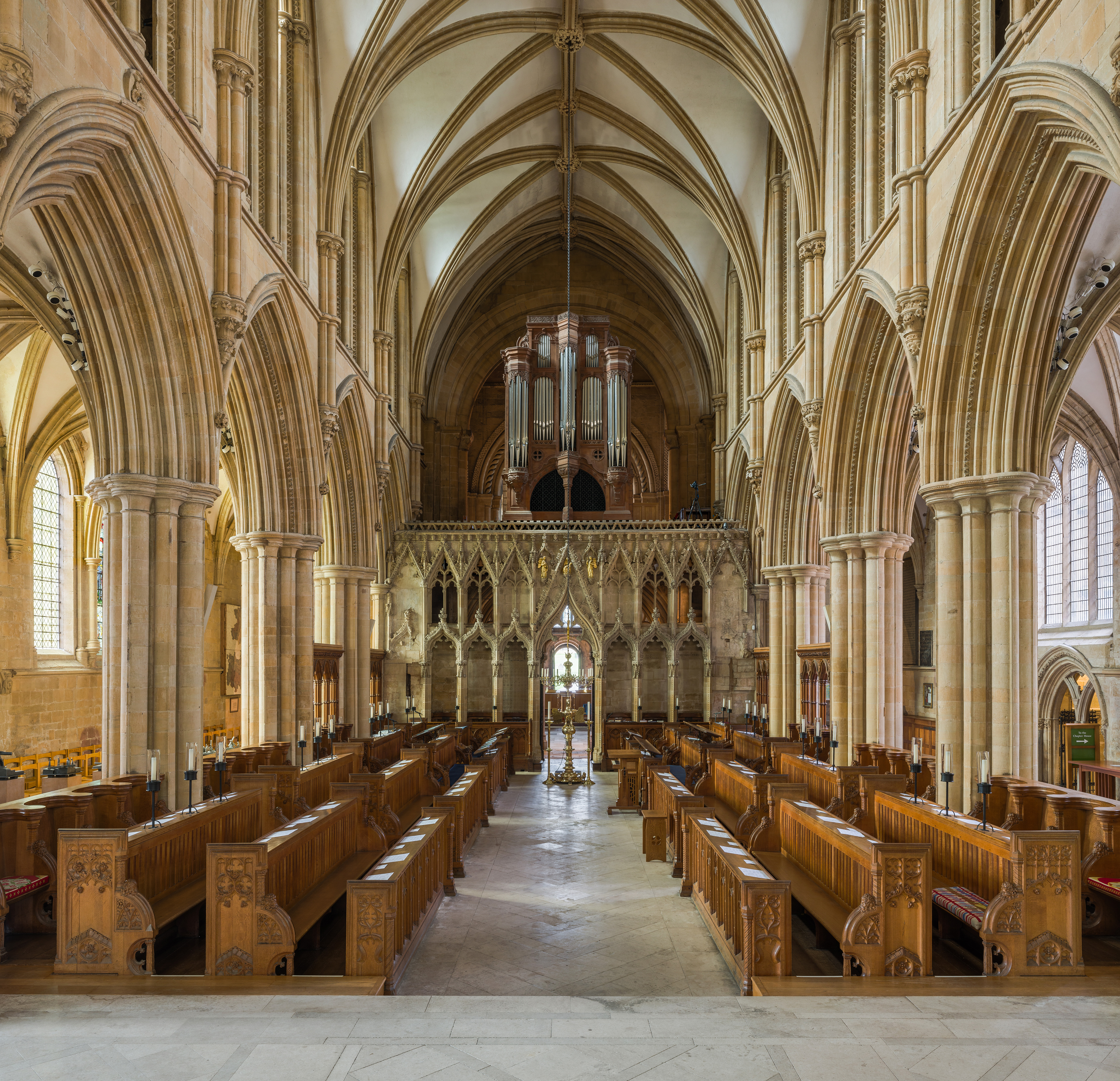
Pulpitum and choir, looking west to the nave

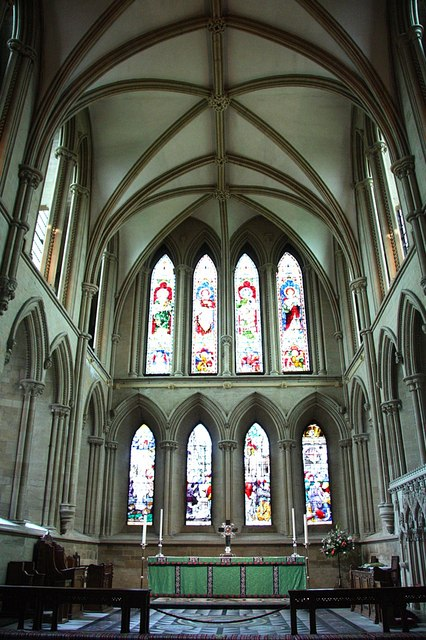
High altar and east window of choir

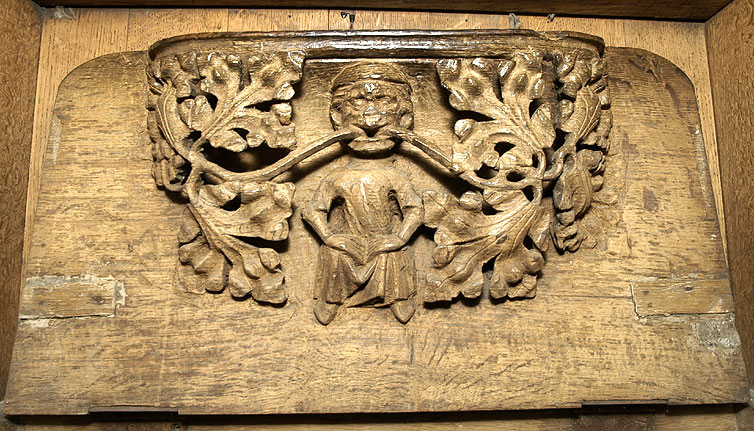
One of the carved misericords in the quire

=== Chapter House ===
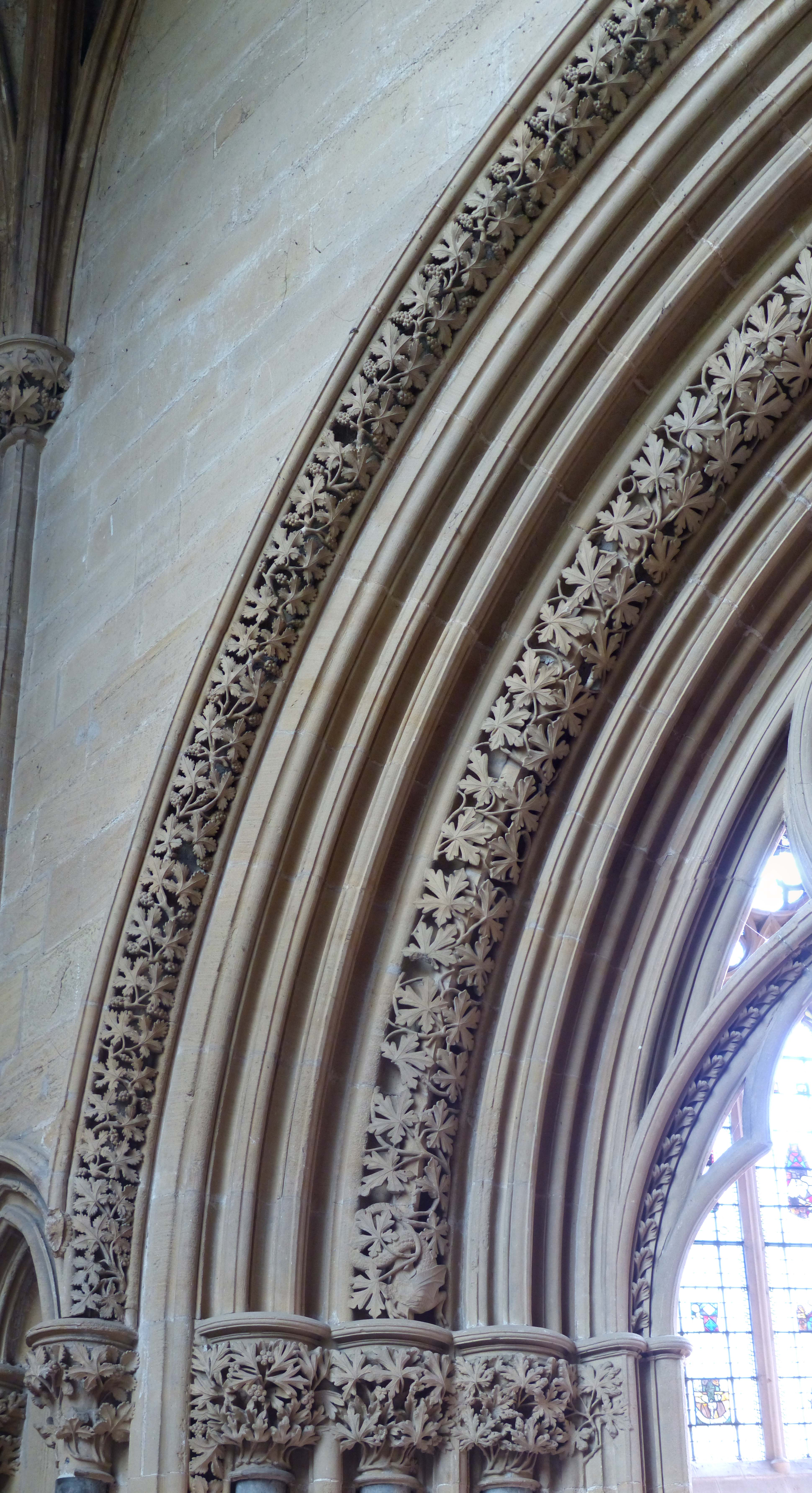
Carvings on the left side of the portal arch of the chapter house

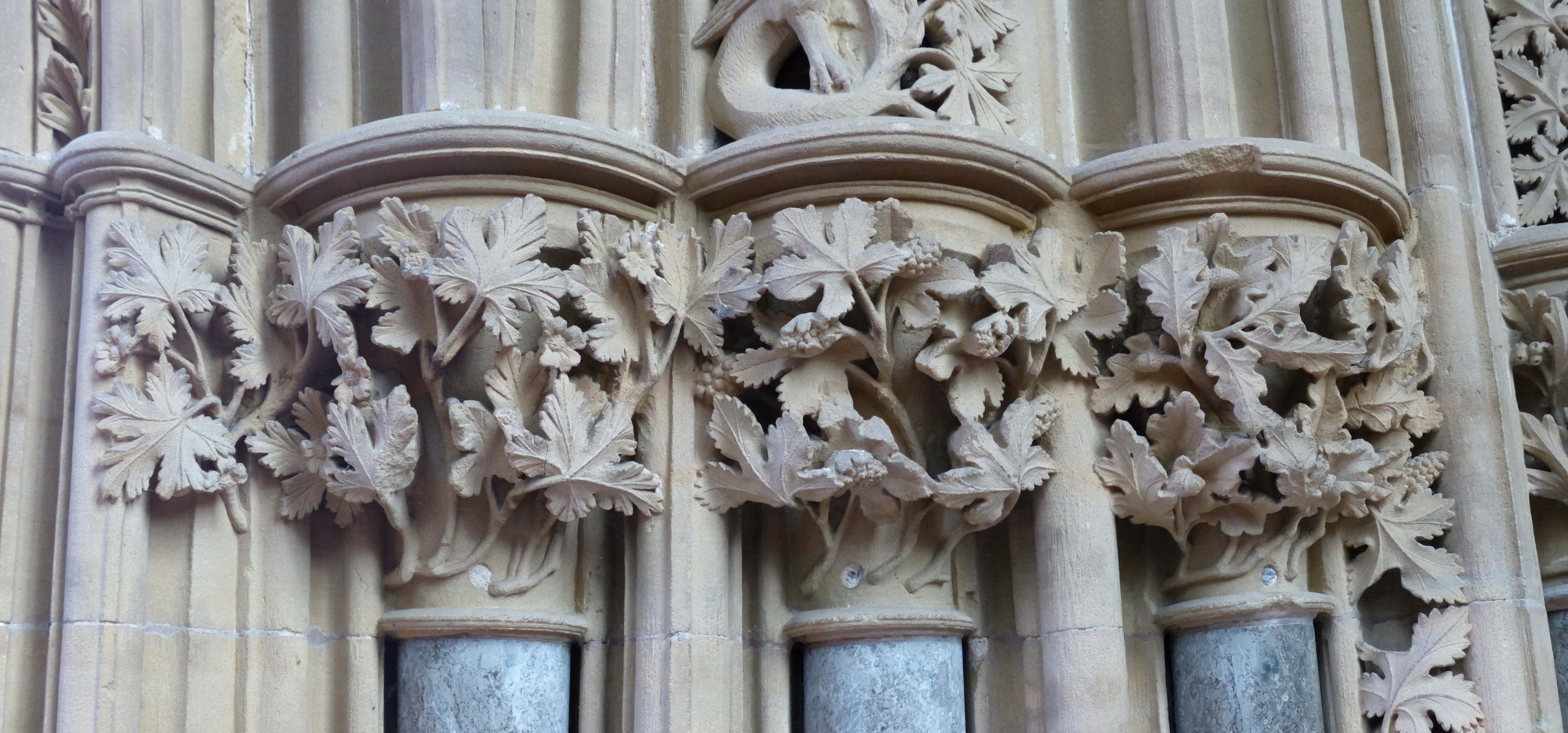
Chapter house portal capitals, right side

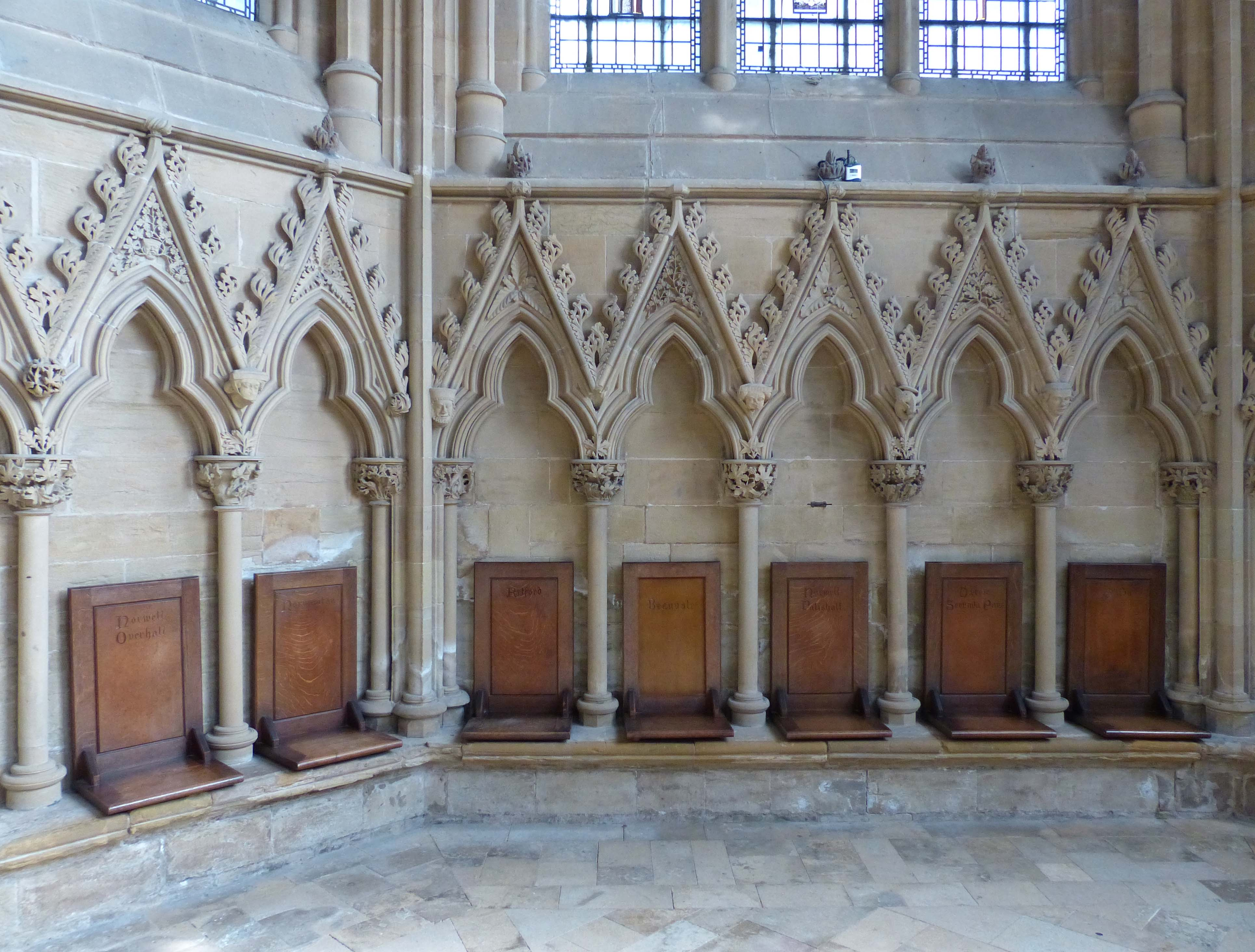
The stalls and canopies of the chapter house

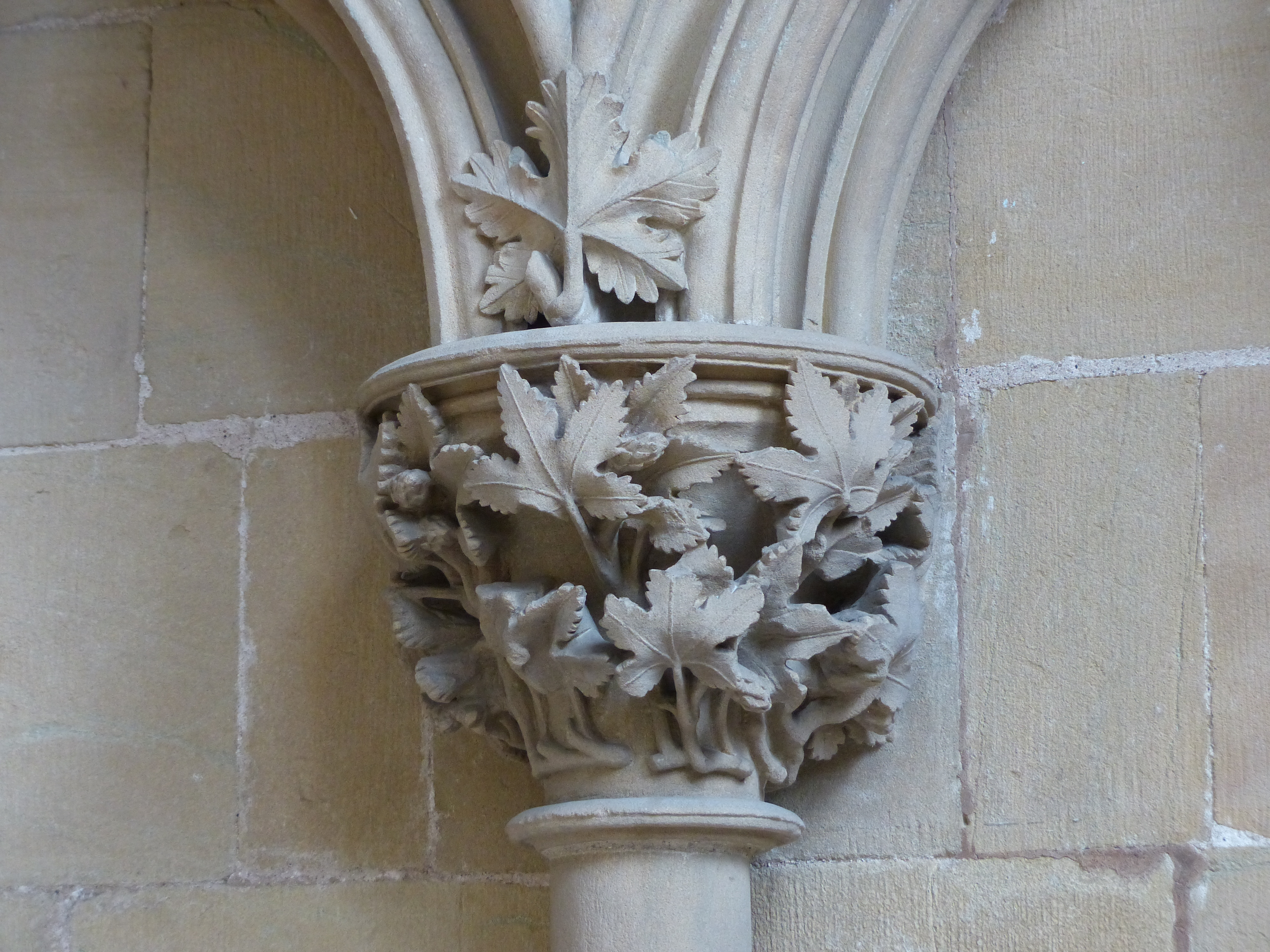
Chapter house capital

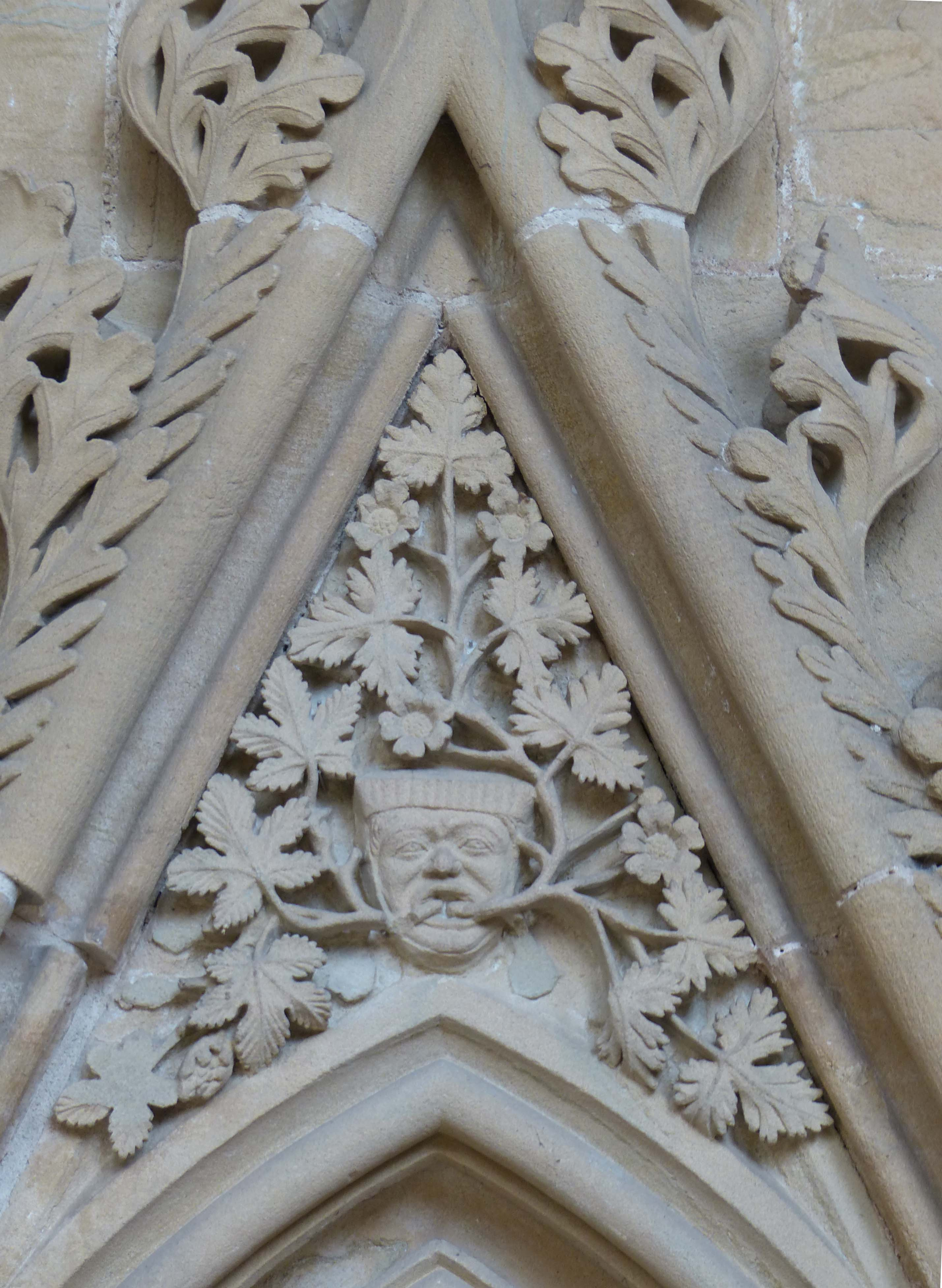
Chapter house stall canopy tympanum showing green man

=== Windows ===
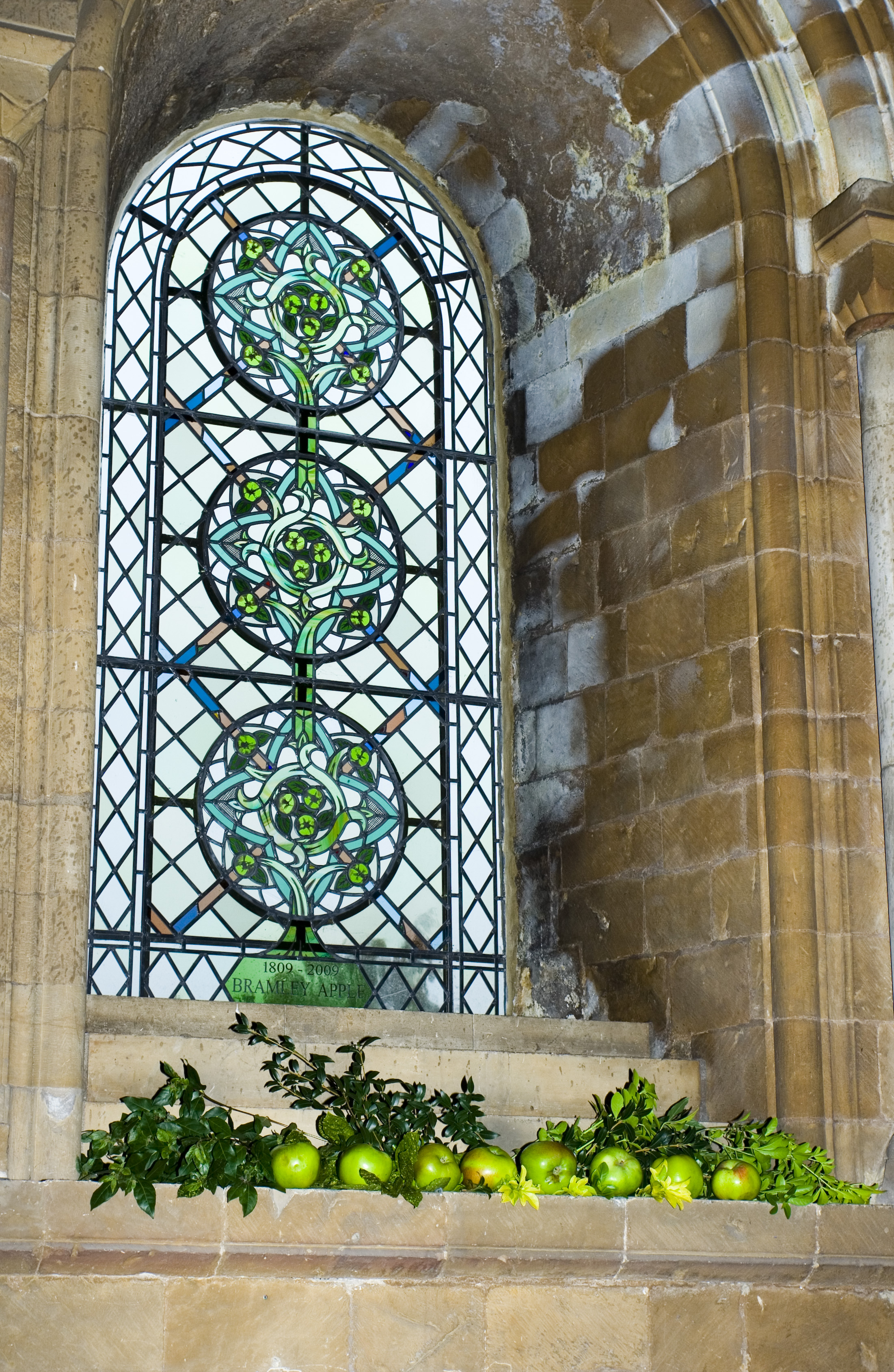

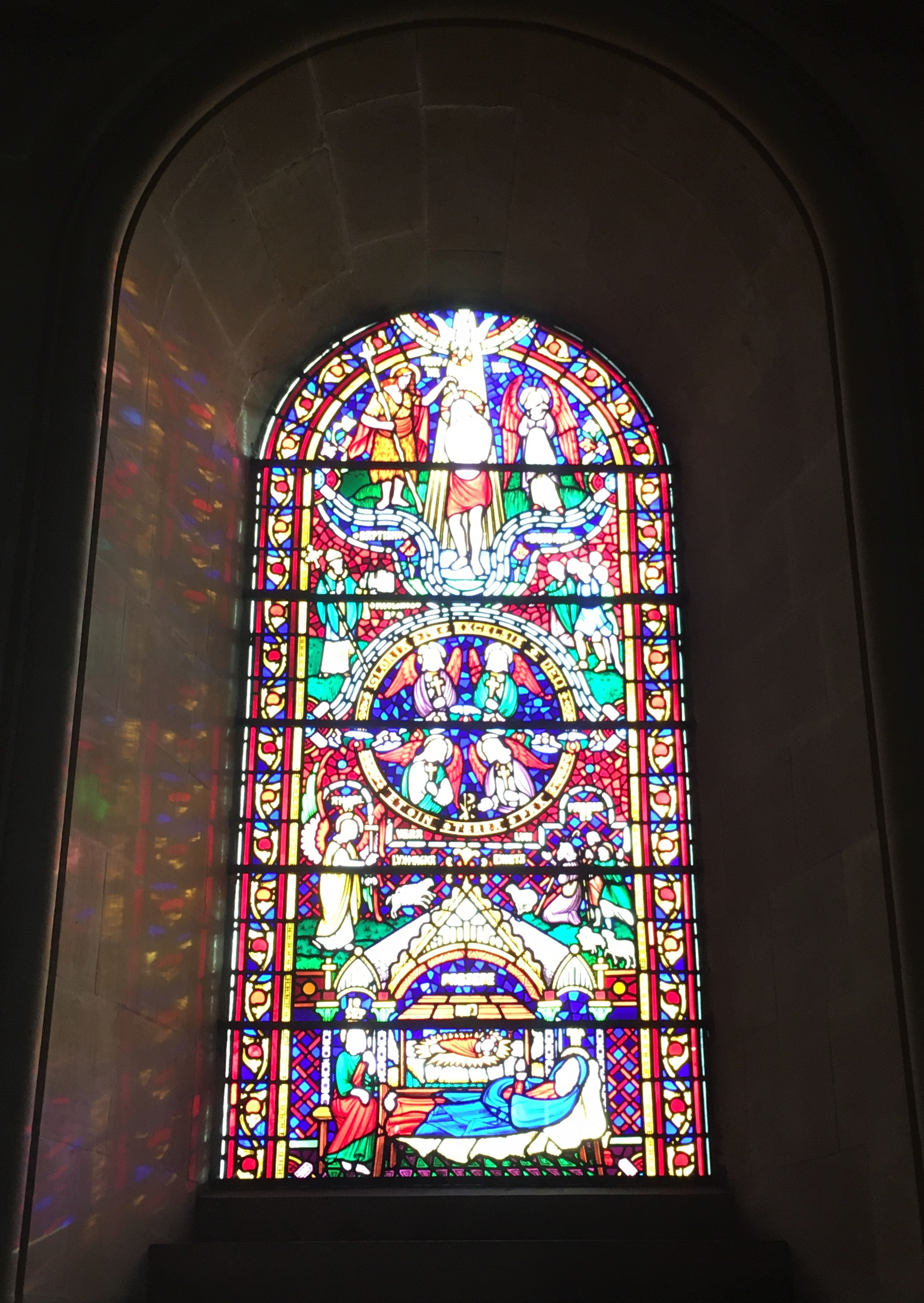

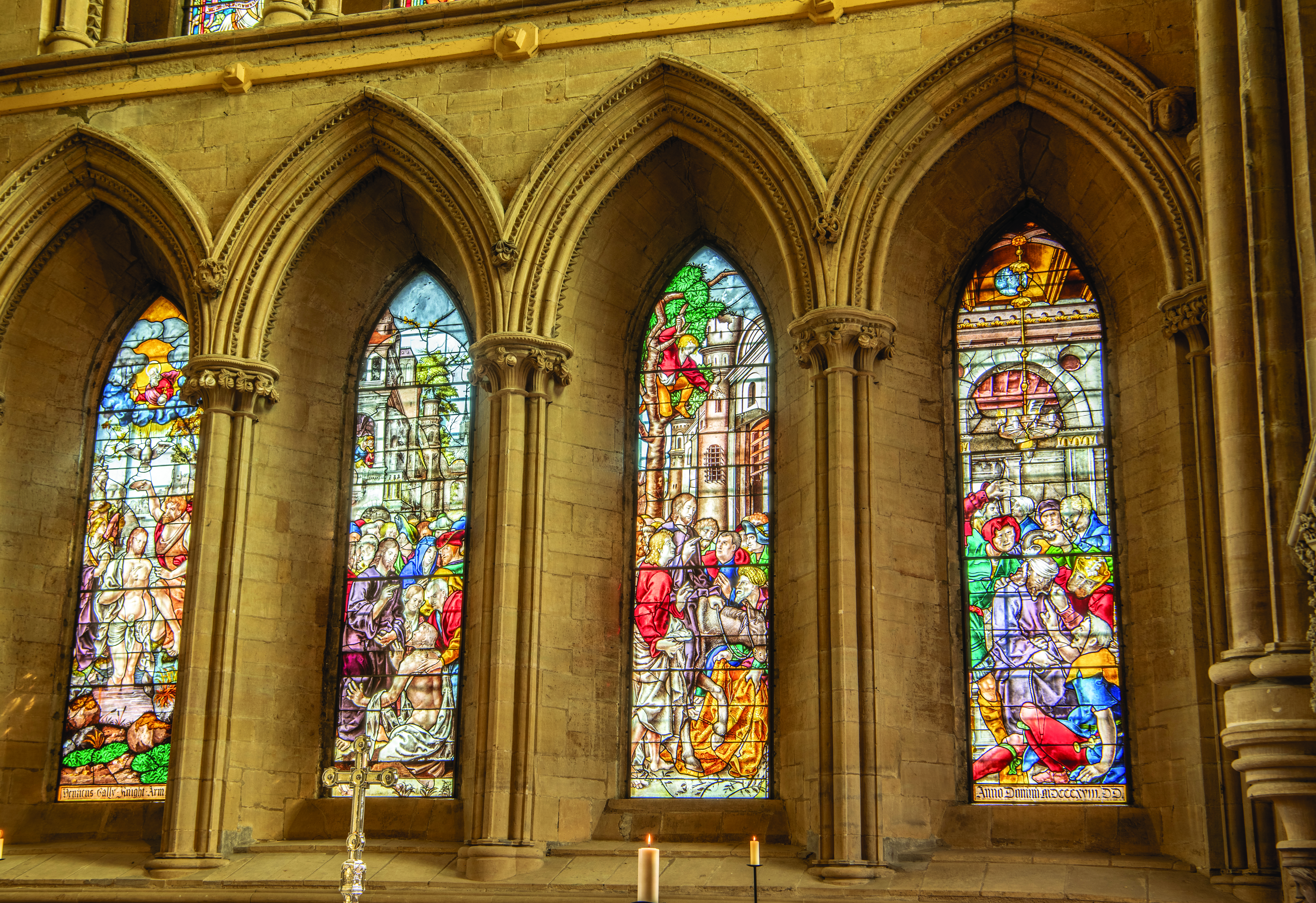

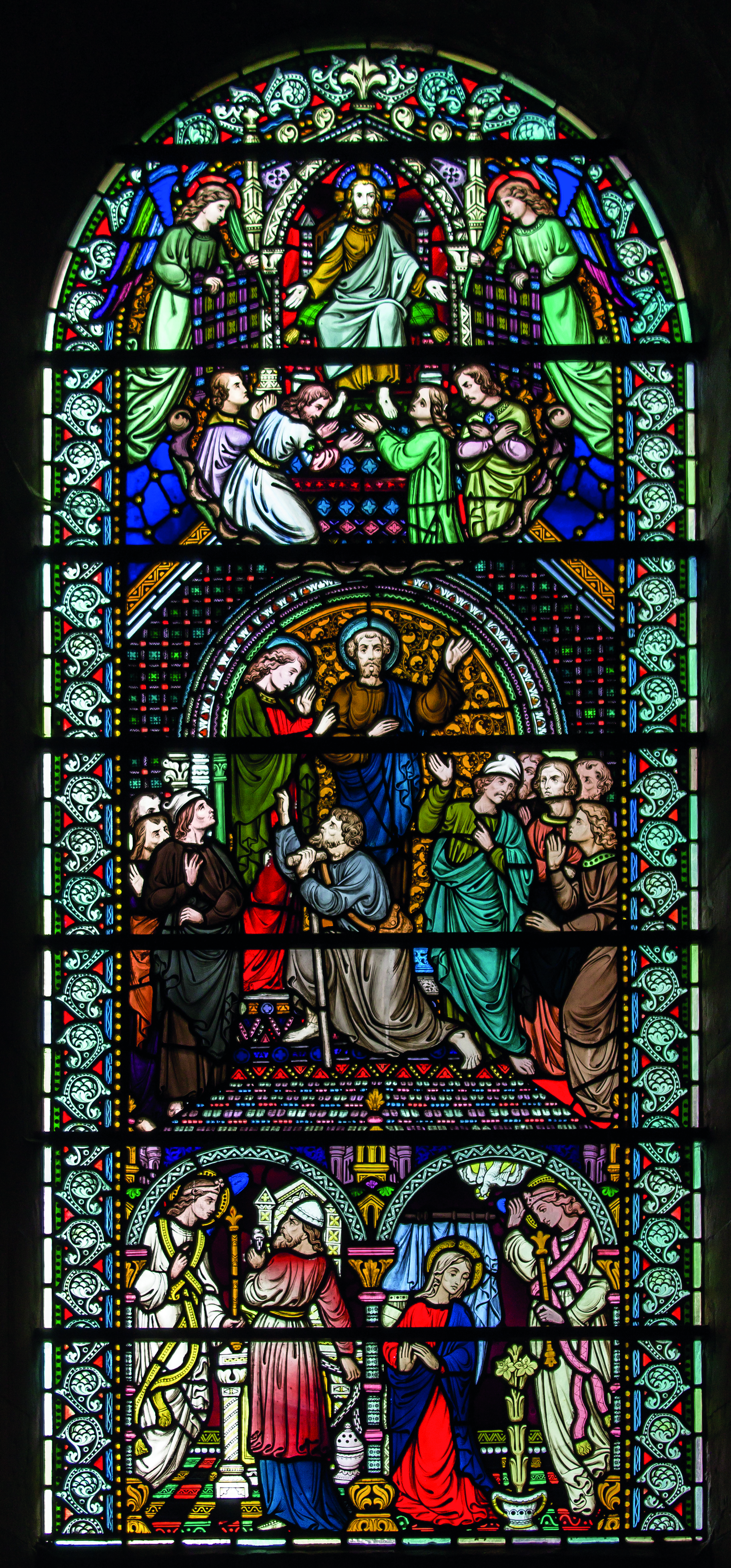

=== Old illustrations ===
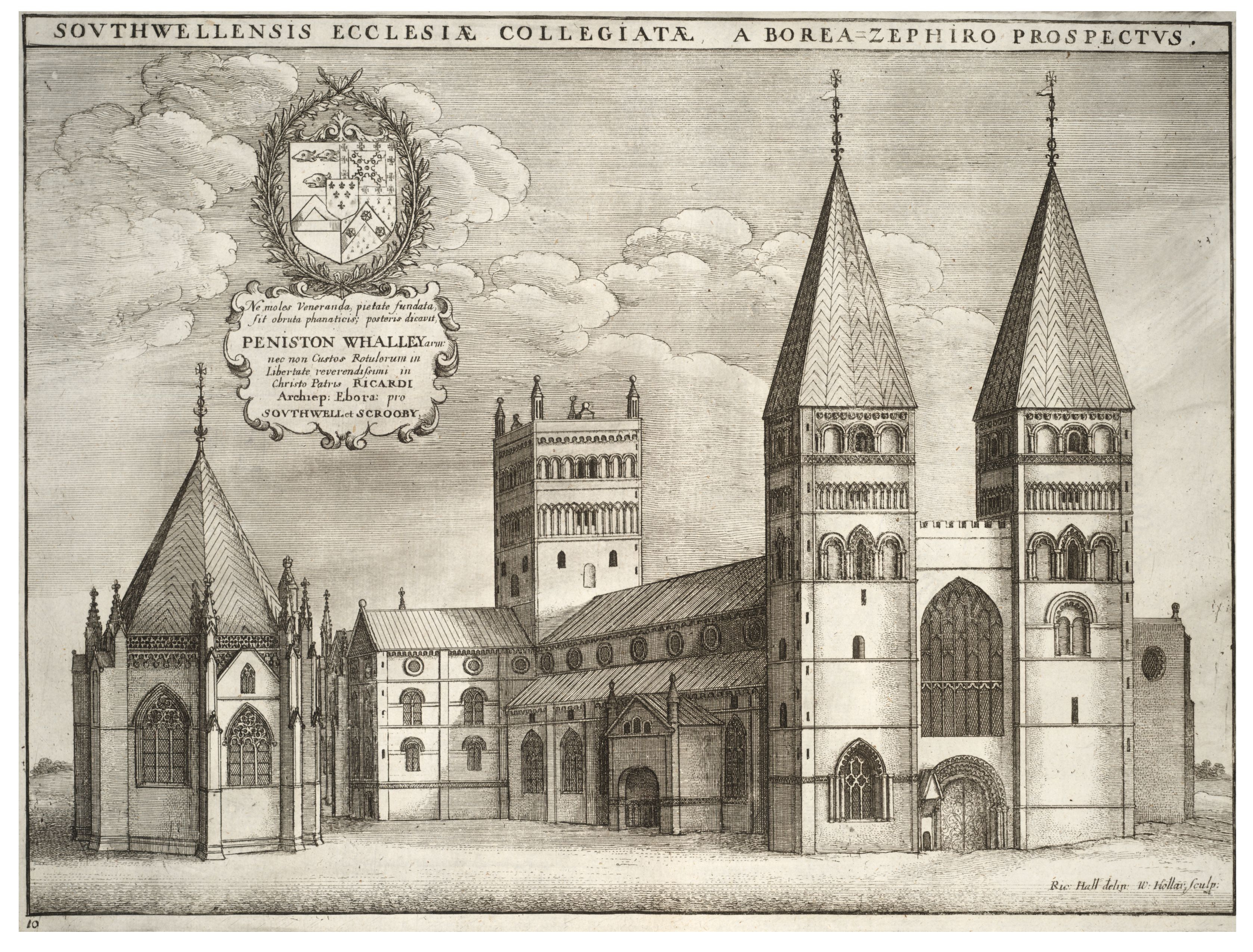
Southwell Minster before the original spires were destroyed by fire in 1711

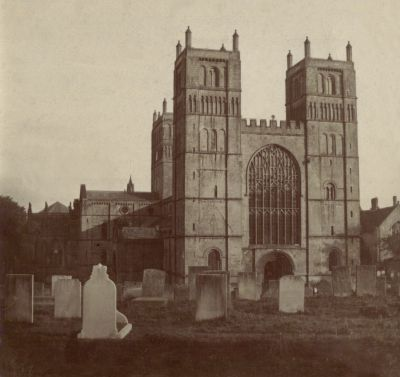
Southwell Minster without the spires, which were removed in 1805 and replaced in 1879-81

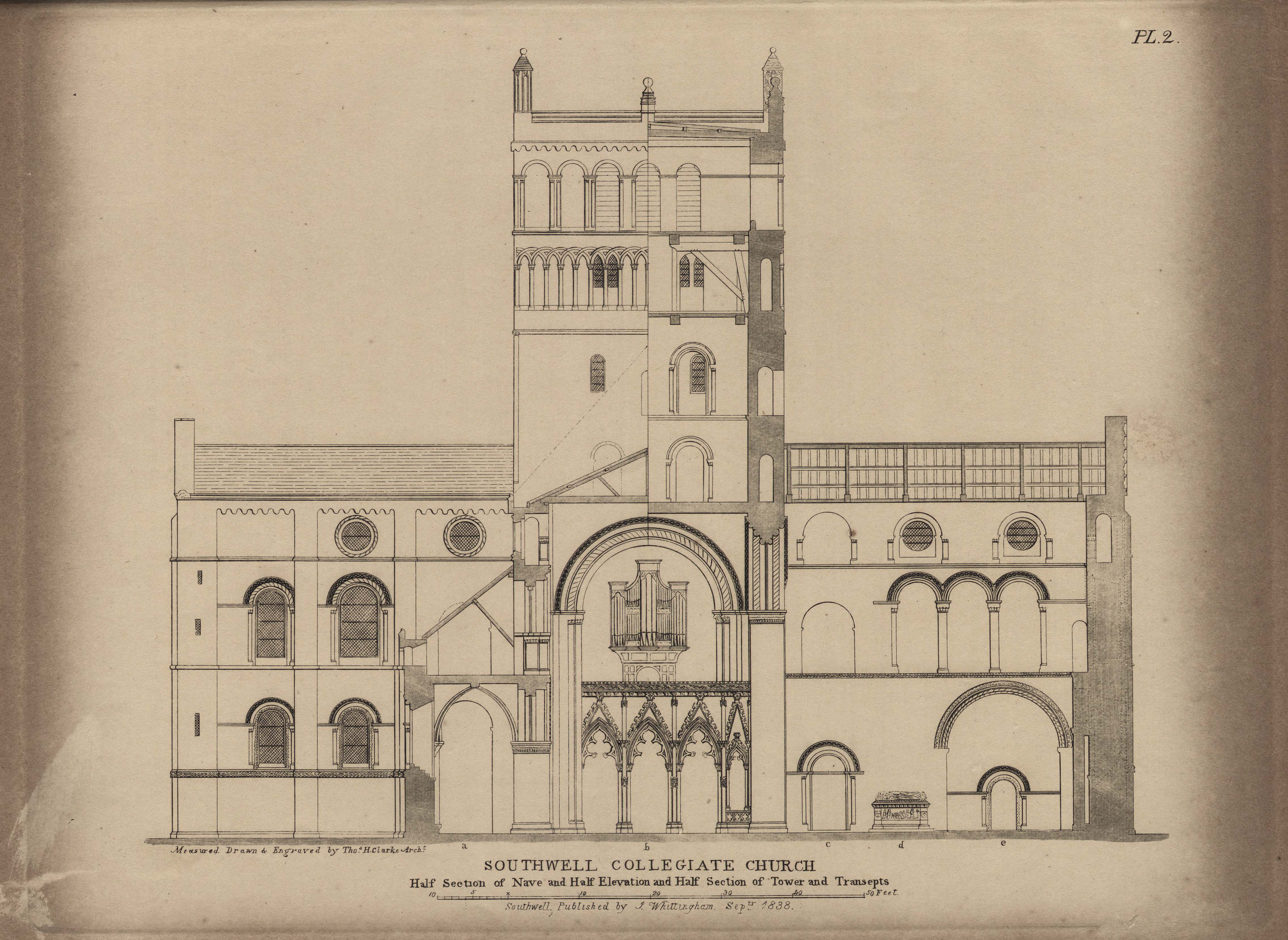
The central tower and transepts

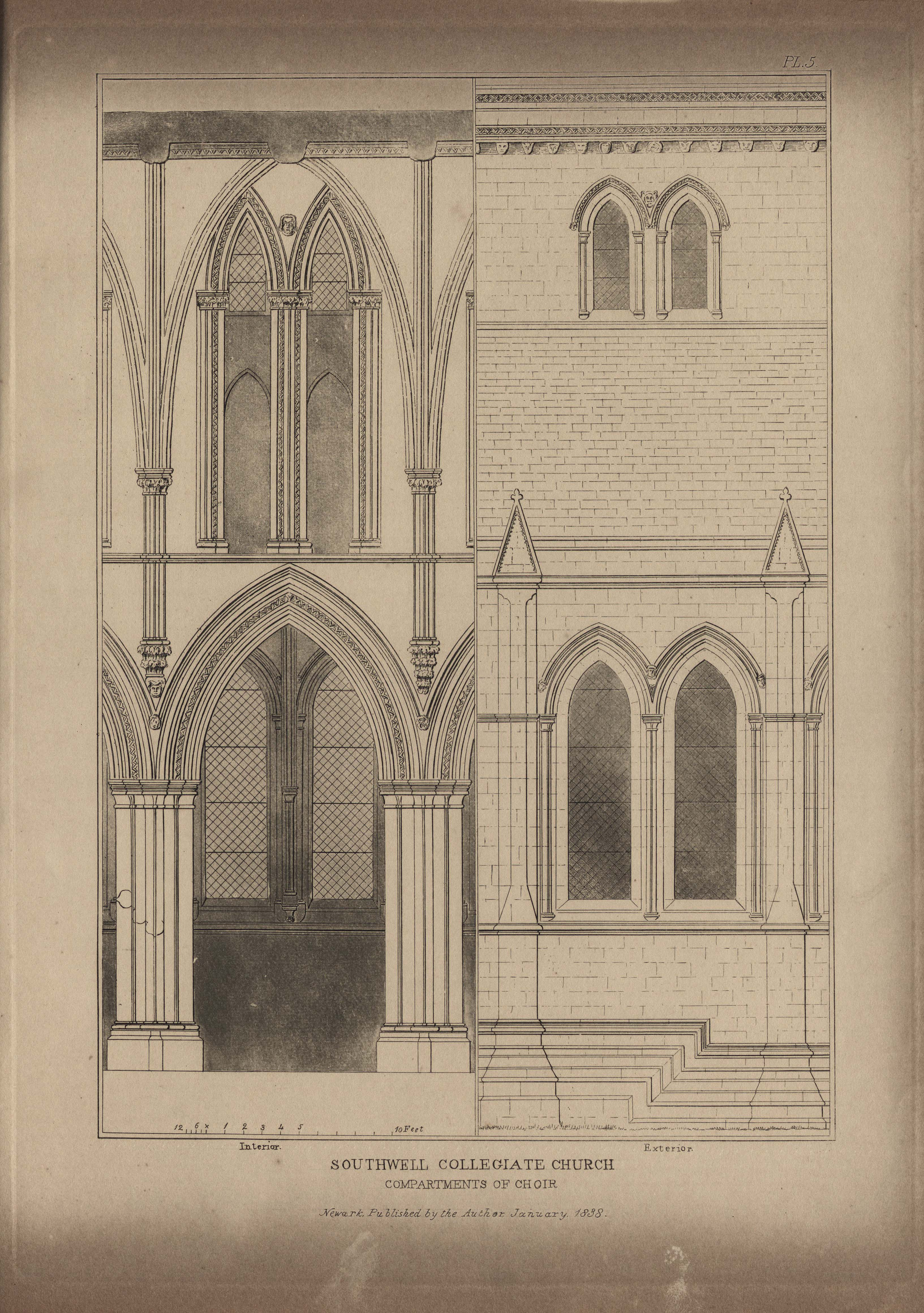
Bays of the choir

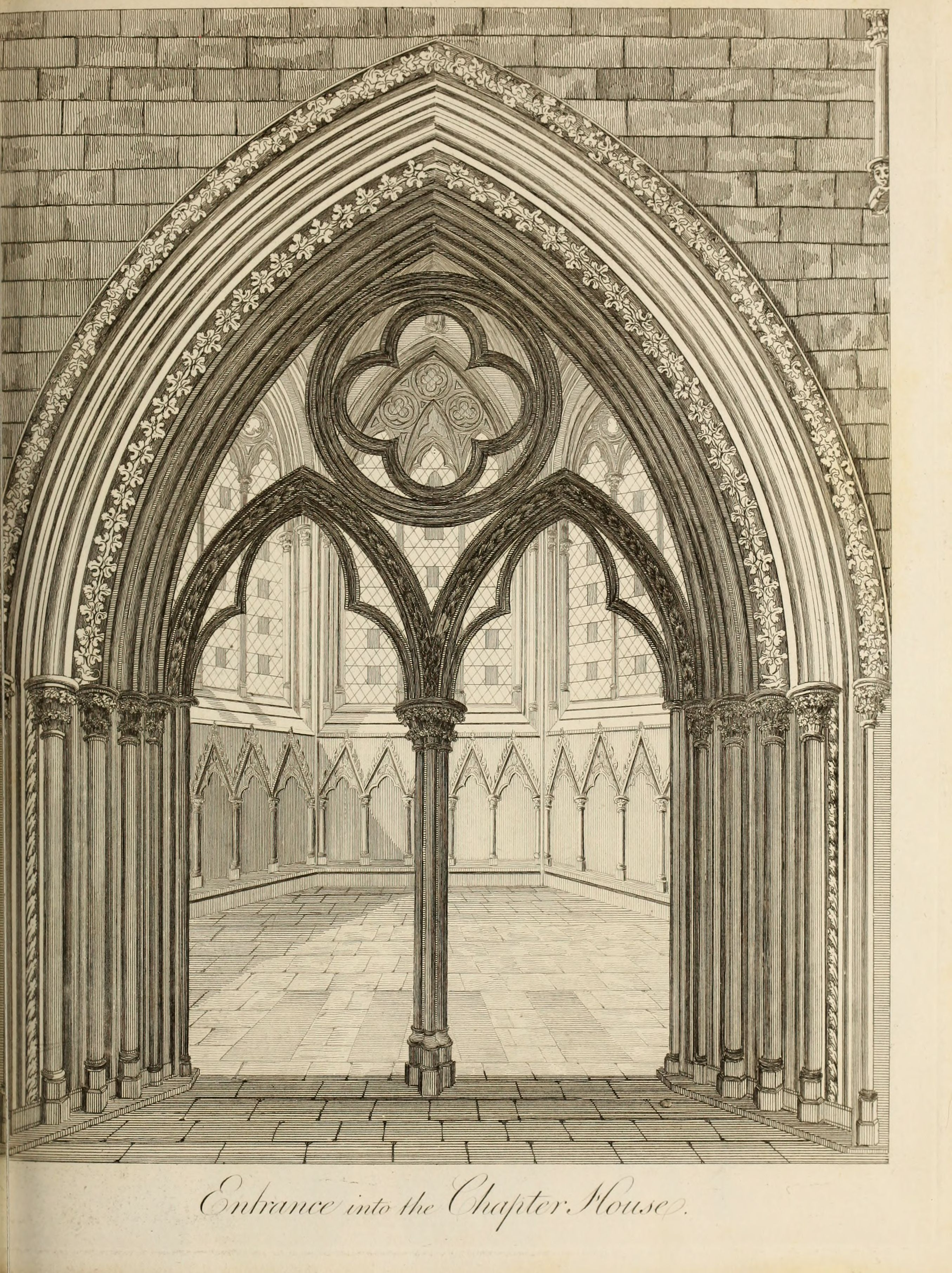
Chapter house portal, 1801

== See also ==
- Architecture of the medieval cathedrals of England
- List of Gothic Cathedrals in Europe
- English Gothic architecture
- Romanesque architecture
- Church of England
- Grade I listed buildings in Nottinghamshire
- Listed buildings in Southwell, Nottinghamshire
- Southwell Preparatory School a private Anglican primary and intermediate school in Hamilton, New Zealand named after the town and cathedral.
