= Chappell Batchelor =

English cricketer and organist

Chappell Batcheler (1 July 1822 – 11 January 1884) was an English organist and first-class cricketer.

== Life ==
Professor Batcheler (Chappell) was born in Southwell in 1822 to John Batcheler and Ann Heathcote. He married Susanna Fletcher in Southwell in 1852. Susanna died in 1869 aged 37 years and Chappell died at 123 New Uttoxeter Road, Derby, on 11 January 1884, aged 62 years leaving three surviving daughters.

== Musical career ==
Chappell was a chorister in the cathedral choir from 1830. In 1838 he studied with Cipirani Potter, John Goss and Vincent Novello at the Royal Academy of Music. He was King's Scholar at the Royal Academy of Music from 1838. He was organist of Southwell Minster Cathedral between 1841 and 1857. After his resignation from Southwell Minster in 1857 he moved to Belper settling as Professor of Music and then to Derby as Professor of Music.

== Cricket ==
Chappell played for Nottinghamshire County Cricket Club from 1845 to 1858. He was a more than average batsman and in 1847 hit 93 for the County Club versus Rugby match. He played in three first-class Notts matches, the first being versus Kent at Canterbury in 1845 and the final one against Surrey at The Oval in 1858.

Cultural offices
Preceded by Frederick Gunton	Rector Chori of Southwell Minster; 1841–1857	Succeeded by Herbert Irons
