= Cedric Bucknall =

English organist and botanist

Cedric Bucknall (2 May 1849 in Bath – 12 December 1921), was an English organist and botanist.

== Life ==
He was the son of John Bucknall and Elizabeth Bassett. He married Abbie Cecilia Frye on 27 April 1873 in West Hackney.

Children:

- Janet Mary Bucknall b. 1874 in Southwell
- Arthur Bucknall b. 1875
- Basil Charles Bucknall b. 1877
- Dorothea Cecilia Bucknall b. 1879
- Constance Caroline Bucknall b. 1881
- Harold Bucknall b. 1882
- Cedric Gordon Bucknall b. 1885

He was buried in Cranford Cemetery, Westbury on Trym, Bristol.

== Career ==
He held posts of:

- Assistant organist at St Matthias' Church, Stoke Newington under William Henry Monk
- Assistant Organist at King's College London
- Organist of St. Thomas' Church, Clapton 1870 - 1872
- Organist of Southwell Minster 1873 - 1876
- Organist of All Saints' Church, Clifton, Bristol

== Botany ==
He was a distinguished amateur botanist, using every opportunity to travel across Europe and collect plants, which he then catalogued at leisure once home. His obituarist James Walter White intimates that Bucknall's original enthusiasm for music waned with the monotony of his jobs, and his real passion was for science, particularly botany. He travelled to "Carinthia, the Apennines, Naples, Sicily, the Baleares, and Southern Spain", in a typical fortnight amassing four hundred species. Fungi of the Bristol District described 1431 species, many of which he illustrated himself, and "100 of these were new to Britain or to science".

Cultural offices
Preceded by Herbert Irons	Rector Chori of Southwell Minster; 1872–1876	Succeeded by William Ringrose
