= Frederick Gunton =

English organist (1813–1888)

Frederick Gunton (1813–1888) was an English organist.

== Life ==
Born in Norwich, he was the son of Thomas and Mary Gunton. He studied organ under Alfred Pettit at St Peter Mancroft in Norwich.

He died in Chester in 1888 and is buried in Upton churchyard.

== Career ==
He was:

- Organist of Southwell Minster 1835–41
- Organist of Chester Cathedral 1841–71

Cultural offices
Preceded by Edward Heathcote	Rector Chori of Southwell Minster; 1835–1841	Succeeded by Chappell Batchelor
Preceded by Thomas Haylett	Organist and Master of the Choristers of Chester Cathedral; 1841–1877	Succeeded by Joseph Cox Bridge
