= Herbert Stephen Irons =

English organist (1834–1905)

Herbert Stephen Irons (19 January 1834 – 29 June 1905), was an English organist. He also composed hymn tunes, including the tune "Southwell".

== Career ==
He was born in Canterbury, where he became a chorister at the cathedral. He was an organ pupil of Dr. Stephen Elvey at Oxford.

He was

- Organist of St. Columba's College, Rathfarnham 1856 - 1857,
- Organist of Southwell Minster 1857 - 1872
- Assistant Organist of Chester Cathedral 1873 - 1876
- Organist of St. Andrew's Church, Nottingham 1876 - 1905

Cultural offices
Preceded by Chappell Batchelor	Rector Chori of Southwell Minster; 1857–1872	Succeeded by Cedric Bucknall
