= Dean of Southwell =

Religious title in the Church of England

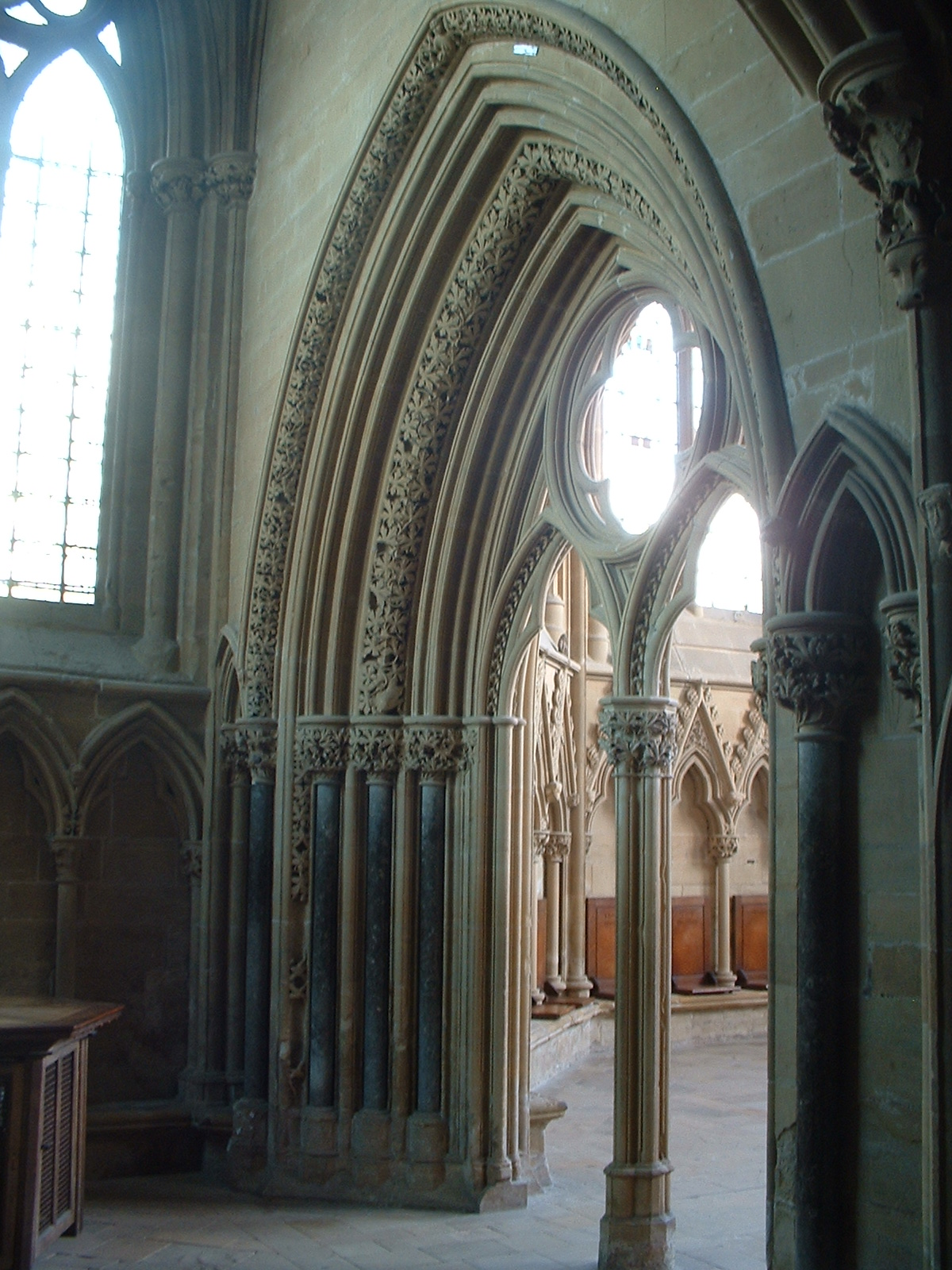
The chapter house at Southwell Minster

The Dean of Southwell is the head (primus inter pares – first among equals) and chair of the chapter of canons, the ruling body of Southwell Minster. The dean and chapter are based at the Cathedral and Parish Church of the Blessed Virgin Mary in Southwell, Nottinghamshire. Before 2000 the post was designated as a provost: the title was then the equivalent of dean (the title used at most English cathedrals) where the cathedral was also a parish church. The cathedral is the mother church of the Diocese of Southwell and Nottingham and seat of the Bishop of Southwell and Nottingham. The current Dean is the Very Reverend Dr Stephen Evans who took up the role on 19 April 2026 having previously served as the as Rector of St Marylebone, London.

== List of deans ==
=== Provosts ===
- 1931–1945 William Conybeare
- 1945–1969 Hugh Heywood
- 1970–1978 John Pratt
- 1978–1991 Murray Irvine
- 1991–19 March 2000 David Leaning (became Dean)

=== Deans ===
- 19 March 2000–2006 David Leaning
- 8 September 2007 – 30 June 2014 (ret.) John Guille
- 30 June 2014 – 17 September 2016: Nigel Coates (Acting)
- 17 September 2016 – September 2024: Nicola Sullivan
- 4 November 2024 — 19 April 2026: Neil Evans (interim)
- 19 April 2026 - present: Stephen Evans (announced)
