= Kirtlington =

Village in Oxfordshire, England

Coordinates: 51°52′23″N 01°16′30″W

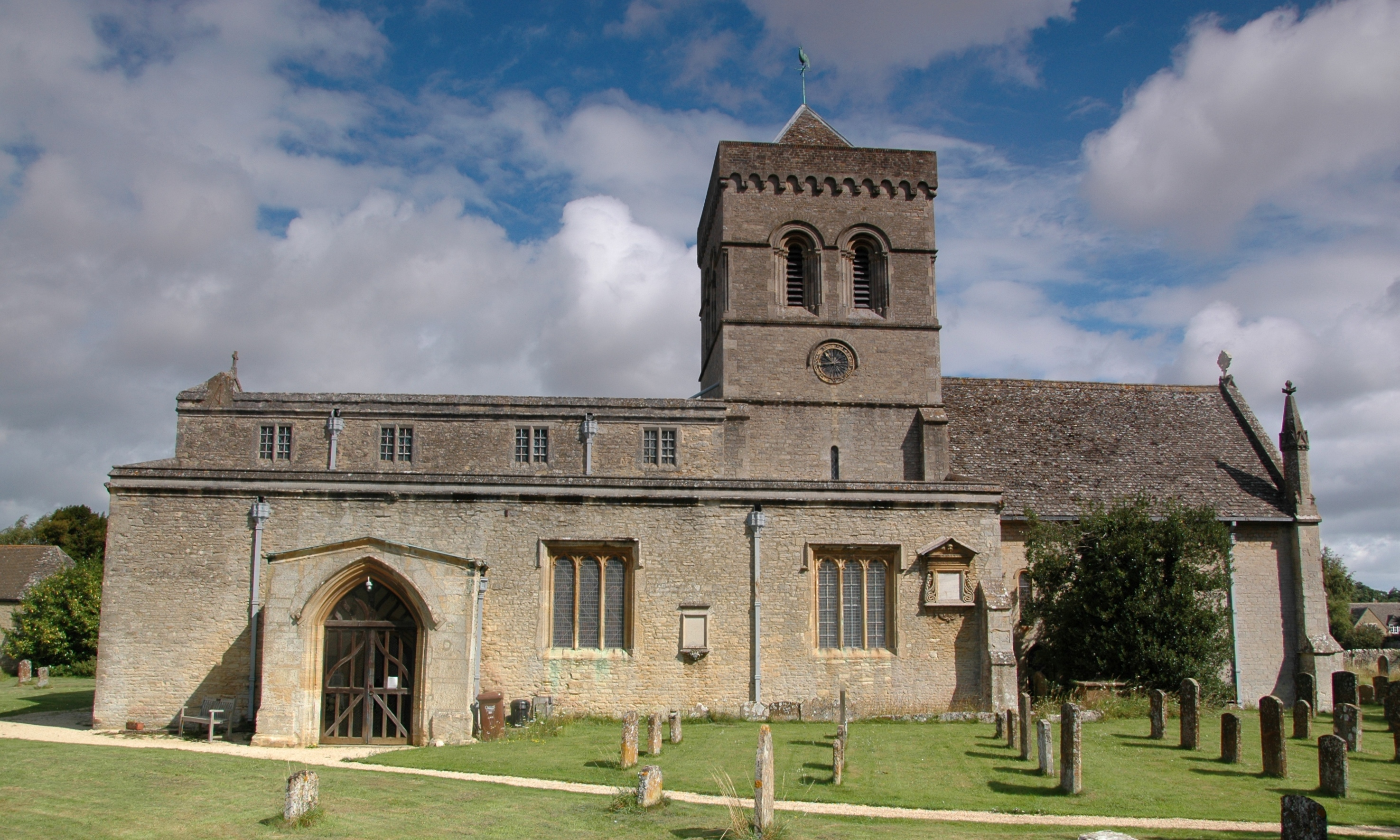
- St Mary the Virgin parish church

- Location within Oxfordshire
- Area: 14.51 km^{2} (5.60 sq mi)
- Population: 988 (2011 Census) (parish, including Northbrook)
  - Density: 68/km^{2} (180/sq mi)
- OS grid reference: SP5019
- Civil parish: Kirtlington
- District: Cherwell
- Shire county: Oxfordshire
- Region: South East
- Country: England
- Sovereign state: United Kingdom
- Post town: Kidlington
- Postcode district: OX5
- Dialling code: 01869
- Police: Thames Valley
- Fire: Oxfordshire
- Ambulance: South Central
- UK Parliament: Bicester and Woodstock
- Website: Kirtlington Oxfordshire

Kirtlington is a village and civil parish in Oxfordshire about 6 1/2 miles (10.5 km) west of Bicester. The parish includes the hamlet of Northbrook. The 2011 Census recorded the parish's population as 988.

The parish measures nearly 3 miles (5 km) north–south and about 2 1/2 miles (4 km) east–west. It is bounded by the River Cherwell to the west, and elsewhere mostly by field boundaries. In 1959 its area was 3,582 acres (1,450 ha).

== Archaeology ==
The Portway is a pre-Roman road running parallel with the Cherwell on high ground about 1 mile (1.6 km) east of the river. It bisects Kirtlington parish and passes through the village. A short stretch of it is now part of the A4095 road through the village. Longer stretches form minor roads to Bletchingdon and Upper Heyford.

Akeman Street Roman road bisects the parish east–west passing just north of Kirtlington village. A 4-mile (6.4 km) minor road linking Kirtlington with Chesterton uses its course. Aves ditch is pre-Saxon. One end of the ditch is in Kirtlington parish about 1 mile (1.6 km) north of the village.

Just east of the parish school is a moated site that is a Scheduled Ancient Monument. Just east of the moated site are the remains of fish ponds.

== Toponym and manor ==
The toponym "Kirtlington" is derived from the Old English for "the enclosure (tūn) of Cyrtla's people". The earliest known record of it is as Cyrtlinctune in a Saxon charter of AD 944–6, now included in the Cartularium Saxonicum.

In the Anglo-Saxon era, Kirtlington was a king's vill. The Anglo-Saxon Chronicle records that in AD 977 King Edward the Martyr held a witenagemot at Kyrtlingtun attended by Dunstan, Archbishop of Canterbury.

The Domesday Book of 1086 records that Certelintone, Cortelintone or Cherielintone had been a royal manor of Edward the Confessor and was now held by the conquering Norman monarchy. The Domesday Book records the manor being a large and valuable estate of 11½ hides yielding an income of £52 a year. The Pipe rolls of 1190 record it as Kertlinton. It remained a royal manor until 1604 when the Crown sold it to two wealthy Londoners.

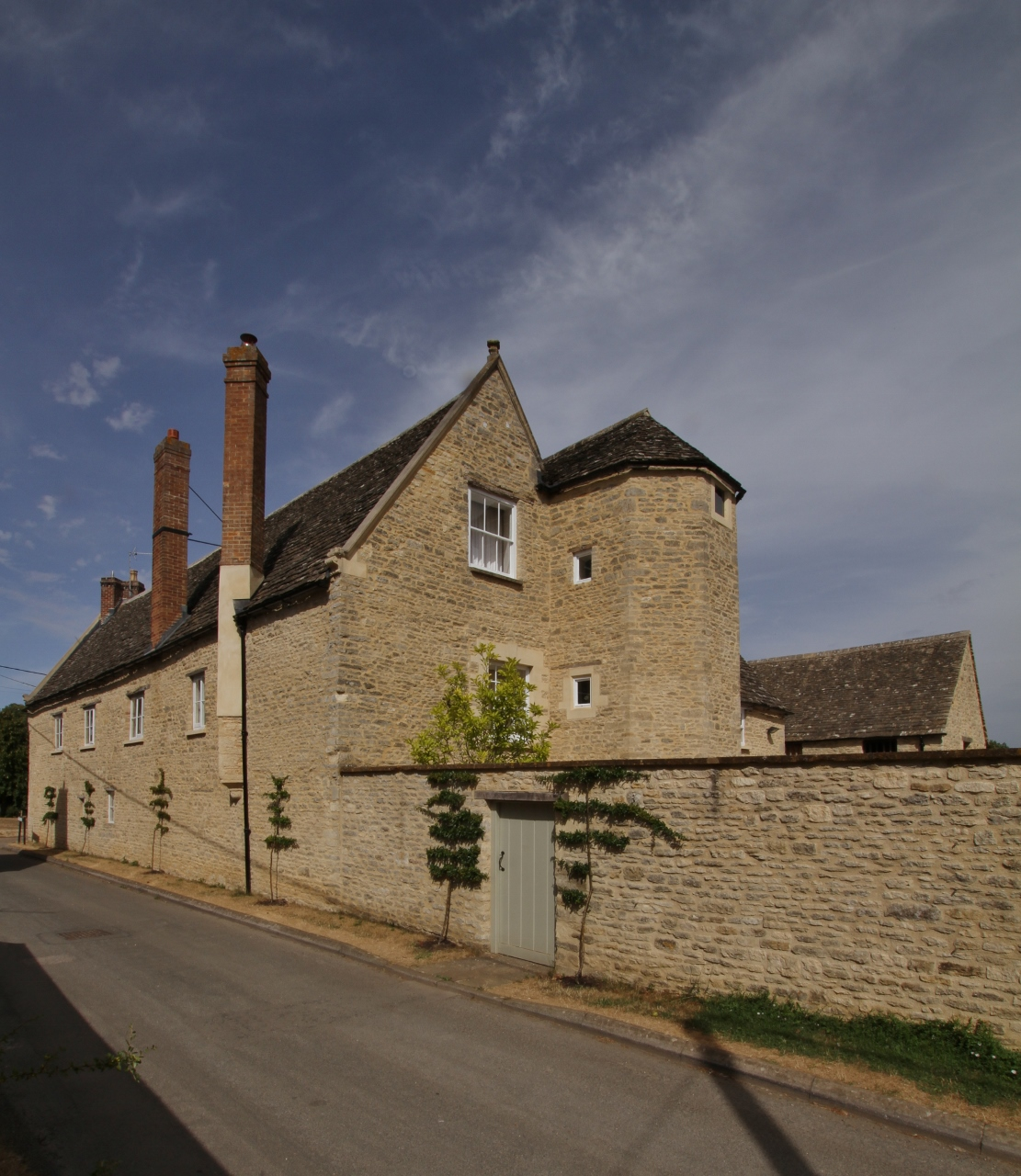
Rear of manor house, showing polygonal stair turret

The manor house is recorded to have had a date-stone of 1563, but this has now been lost. The house is L-shaped, has a polygonal stair-turret on the south side and a corbelled chimney-stack in the west side.

== Church and chapels ==
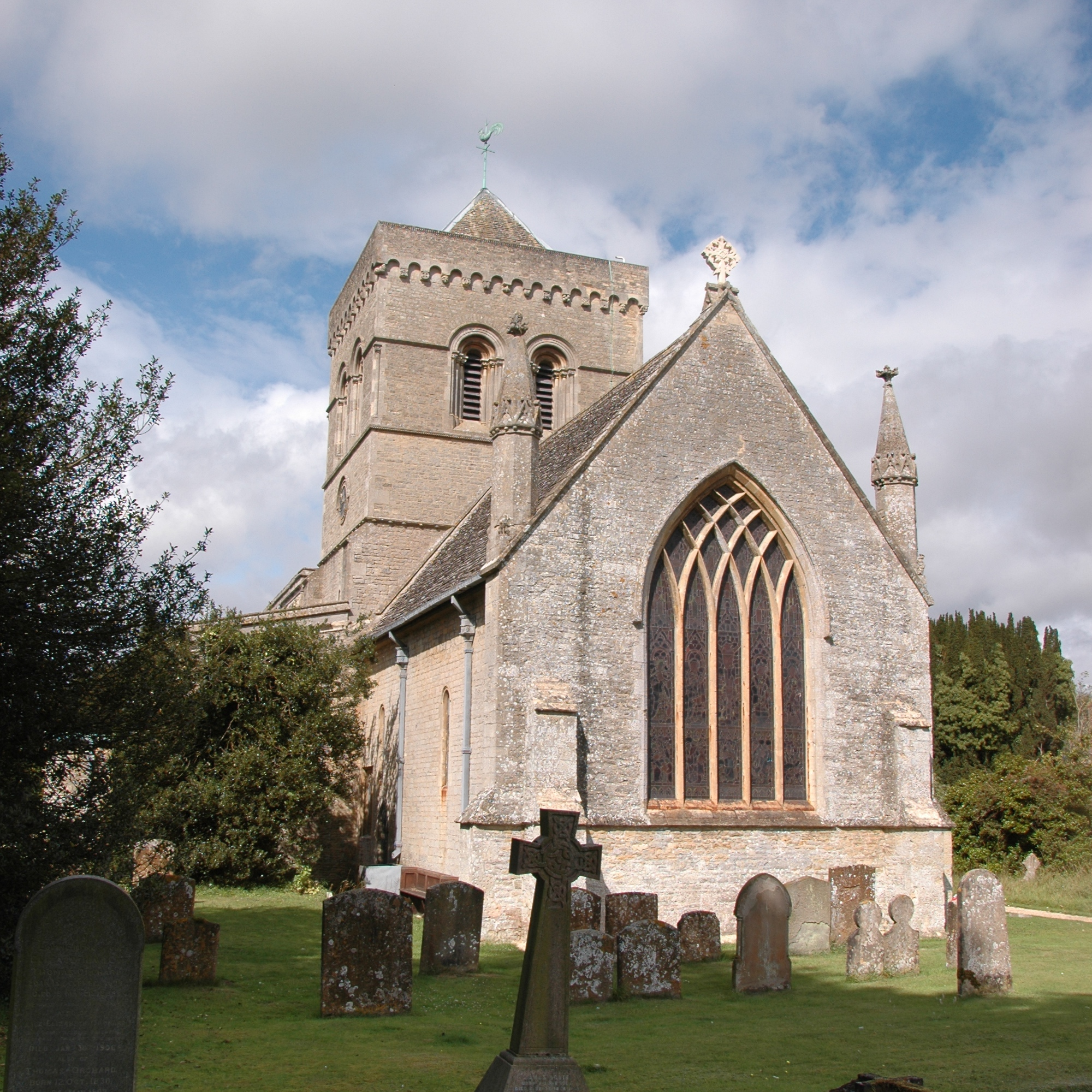
St Mary the Virgin parish church from the east, showing the intersecting tracery of the chancel's 14th-century east window

=== Parish church ===
The earliest known record of a parish church at Kirtlington is in the Domesday Book of 1086. The oldest visible parts of the Church of St Mary the Virgin include the early 12th-century Norman arches supporting the central bell tower, and a tympanum of the same date that is now over the vestry door. Beneath the floor of the chancel are the foundations of a former apse that also was built early in the 12th century.

About 1250 the nave was rebuilt and north and south aisles were added, each linked with the nave by arcades of three bays. The transeptal chapel of Our Lady on the south side of the tower may be of the same date, and the apse was replaced with a rectangular chancel late in the 13th century.

The west window of the nave dates from the 14th century, as do two windows flanking a blocked 13th-century doorway in the north aisle. The east window of the chancel, west doorway of the nave and south doorway of the south aisle are also 14th-century. In the 15th century a clerestory was added to the nave and a porch was added to the south door. The Lady Chapel was also rebuilt in the 15th century, and other late medieval additions include the Perpendicular Gothic windows of the south aisle and another Perpendicular Gothic window in the north aisle.

By 1716 the Lady chapel was ruinous and Sir Robert Dashwood, 1st Baronet had it converted into a family chapel and burial vault. In 1770 the tower was unsafe and was demolished, leaving its arches between the nave and chancel. In about 1853 Sir Henry William Dashwood, 5th Baronet had the bell tower rebuilt by the Gothic Revival architect Benjamin Ferrey in a Norman Revival style. In 1877 Sir Henry and Lady Dashwood had the chancel restored by Sir George Gilbert Scott. At the same time the organ was installed in the Dashwood Chapel, obscuring a 1724 memorial to the first three Dashwood baronets and other members of the family. St Mary's is a Grade I listed building.

The rebuilt bell tower has a ring of eight bells. Henry III Bagley of Chacombe, Northamptonshire cast three of the bells in 1718, presumably at his then bellfoundry in Witney. Abel Rudhall of Gloucester cast the tenor bell in 1753. Two bells came from the Whitechapel Bell Foundry: one cast by Charles and George Mears in 1853 and the other by Mears and Stainbank in 1870. The current ring of eight was completed when John Taylor & Co of Loughborough cast the treble in 1938. St Mary's has also a Sanctus bell cast by Henry III Bagley in 1718.

St Mary the Virgin is now part of the Akeman Church of England Benefice, which includes the parishes of Bletchingdon, Chesterton, Hampton Gay, Middleton Stoney, Wendlebury and Weston-on-the-Green.

=== Methodist ===
Kirtlington's first nonconformist meeting house was licensed in 1821 and was a member of the Oxford Methodist Circuit by 1824. A Wesleyan chapel was built in 1830 and replaced by a stone-built chapel in 1854. In 1867 it belonged to the United Methodist Free Churches, which in 1907 became part of the United Methodist Church. By 1954 the chapel had only about six members. It has since closed and is now a private house.

== Economic and social history ==
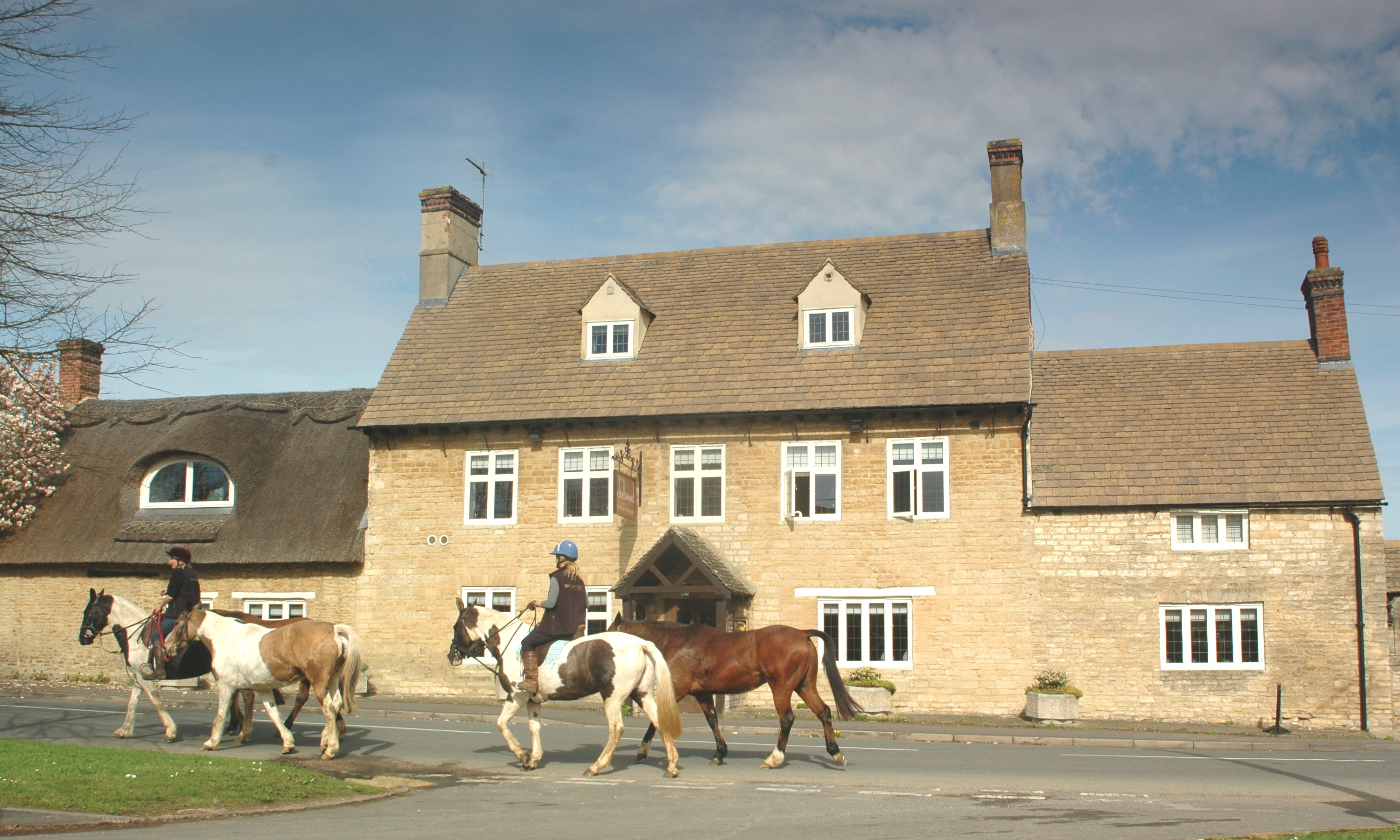
The Dashwood Hotel

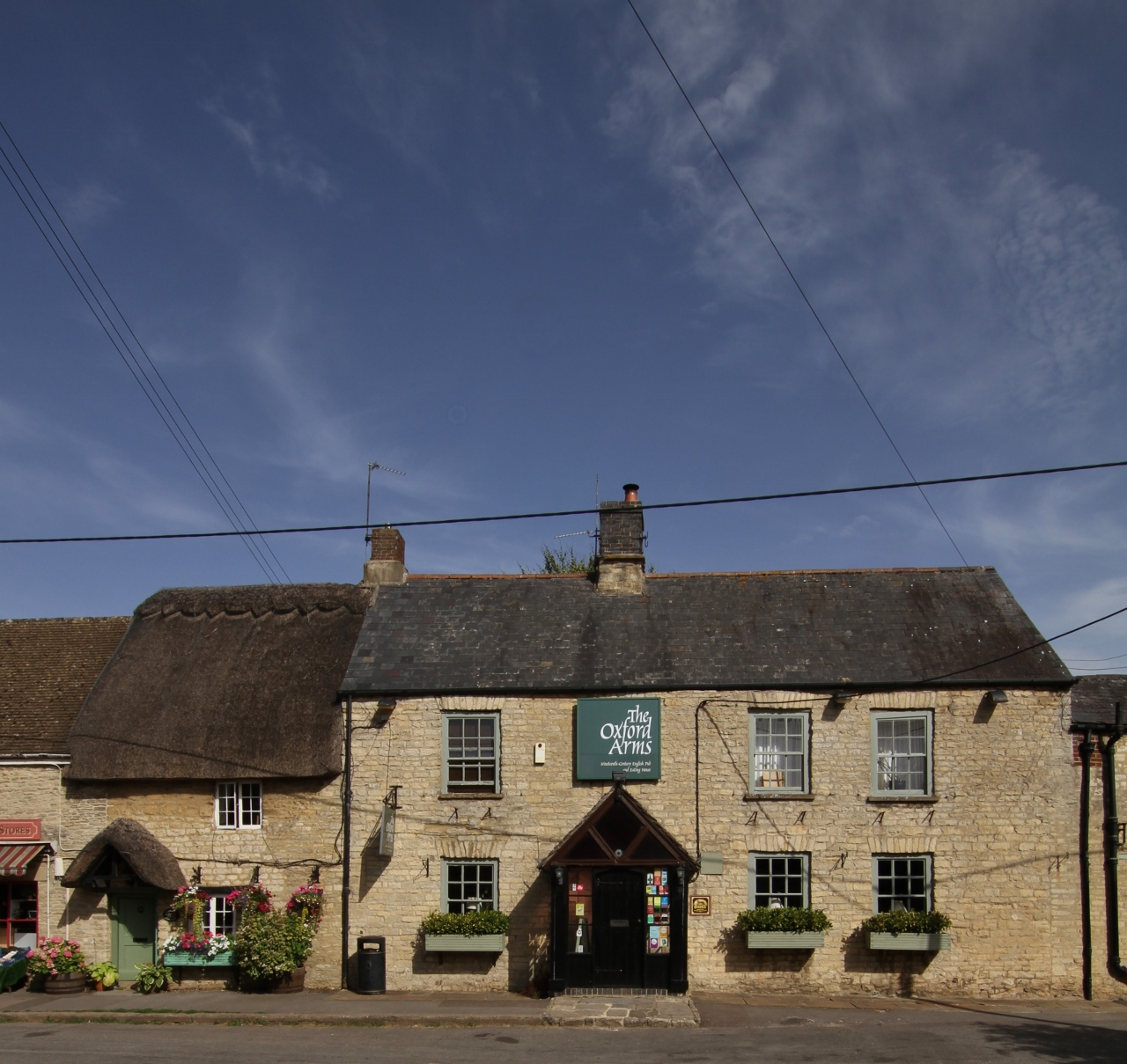
The Oxford Arms public house (centre and right), with Garden Cottage next door (left)

Kirtlington had two water mills on the River Cherwell. They are recorded in the Domesday Book of 1086, and in subsequent documents in about 1240, 1538 and 1689. All documents thereafter refer to only one mill in the parish. There was once a horse mill in the village.

There were small enclosures of farmland in the parish in the 13th century and 99 acres (40 ha) had been enclosed by 1476, but at that stage most of the parish was still farmed under an open field system. By 1750 the enclosed land totalled about of which 900 acres (360 ha), and the remaining common lands were enclosed in 1815.

In 1583 a draper called John Phillips bequeathed the rental income from a house in Woodstock to employ a schoolmaster in Kidlington. His bequest did not provide for a schoolhouse, so a tenement called Church House was used. In 1759 the school had to close because the house in Woodstock had decayed to the point that it was unfit to be let. In 1766 the house was let on a repairing lease to George Spencer, 4th Duke of Marlborough and between 1774 and 1778 the school reopened. The vicar and Sir James Dashwood, 2nd Baronet were the governors, and it seems that subsequently the Dashwoods as well as the Phillips endowment supported the school.

By 1808 two other schools had been founded in Kirtlington, and by 1814 one of them was a National School. In 1833 the three schools were effectively merged and in 1834 a purpose-built schoolhouse was opened. In 1947 it was reorganised as a junior and infants' school and in 1951 it became a voluntary aided school. It is now Kirtlington Church of England School.

== Lamb Ale ==
The annual village festival is called the Lamb Ale. By 1679 it was an established tradition that would start the day after Trinity Sunday and last for two days. That year Thomas Blount and Josiah Beckwith wrote:

At Kidlington in Oxford-shire the Custom is, That on Monday after Whitson week, there is a fat live Lamb provided, and the Maids of the Town, having their Thumbs ty'd behind them run after it, and she that with her mouth takes and holds the Lamb, is declared Lady of the Lamb, which being dress'd with the skin hanging on, is carried on a long Pole before the Lady and her Companions to the Green, attended with Musick and a Morisco Dance of Men, and another of Women, where the rest of the day is spent in dancing, mirth and merry glee. The next day the Lamb is part bak'd, boyld and rost, for the Ladies feast, where she sits majestically at the upper end of the Table and her Companions with her, with musick and other attendants, which ends the solemnity.

It is considered that the reference to Kidlington was a mistake, and that Kirtlington was the correct location. Later the festival extended to a whole week and in 1849 three special constables were sworn in "for the better preservation of peace and order at the ensuing Lamb Ale Feast". The custom died out early in the 1860s.

In 1979 Kirtlington Morris was formed and revived the tradition in a modified form. Every year since the Ale has been held at the end of May or in early June. Typically about 20 morris sides attend the festival.

== Kirtlington Park ==
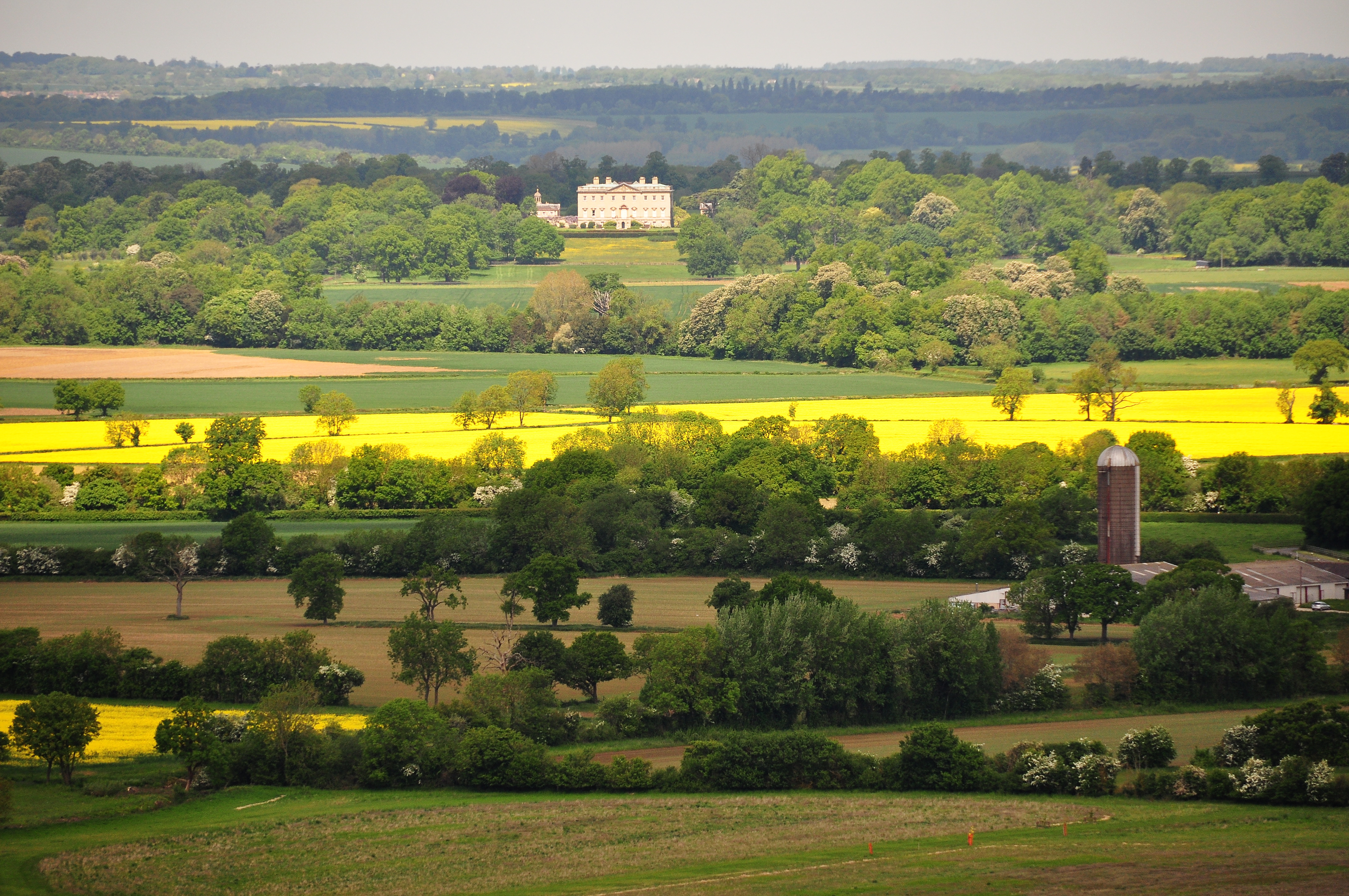
Kirtlington Park, now a wedding venue.

Kirtlington Park is a Palladian country house about 1/2 mile (800 m) east of the village, built in 1742–46. It is a Grade I listed building. It is set in 3,000 acres (1,200 ha) of parkland, landscaped by Lancelot "Capability" Brown, with views over the gardens to the Chiltern Hills.

The house was built for Sir James Dashwood, 2nd Baronet (1715–79), after he had married an heiress, Elizabeth Spencer. In 1740 he was elected a knight of the shire (MP) for Oxfordshire. Kirtlington Park, still unfinished at Dashwood's death,

Kirtlington remained in the family until 1909, when Sir George John Egerton Dashwood, 6th baronet, sold the house to the Earl of Leven and Melville. By 1922 it was owned by Hubert Maitland Budgett.

In the Second World War the park was used as a victory garden. Kirtlington Park is licensed to hold civil weddings.

=== Polo ===
In 1926 Hubert Budgett founded the polo club after Major Deed, who had lived in Argentina, persuaded him to play the game. In 1954, after the Second World War, Hubert Budgett's son Alan reopened the club and added a second ground. By 2005 a sixth polo ground had been added. Famous players who started by playing at Kirtlington Park include Malcolm Borwick, Henry Brett, Robert Thame and Thor Gilje.

Kirtlington Park polo school was founded in 1994 by Melissa Wadley with David Heston-Ellis. They celebrated 30 years of Kirtlington Park Polo School in 2024.

== Amenities ==
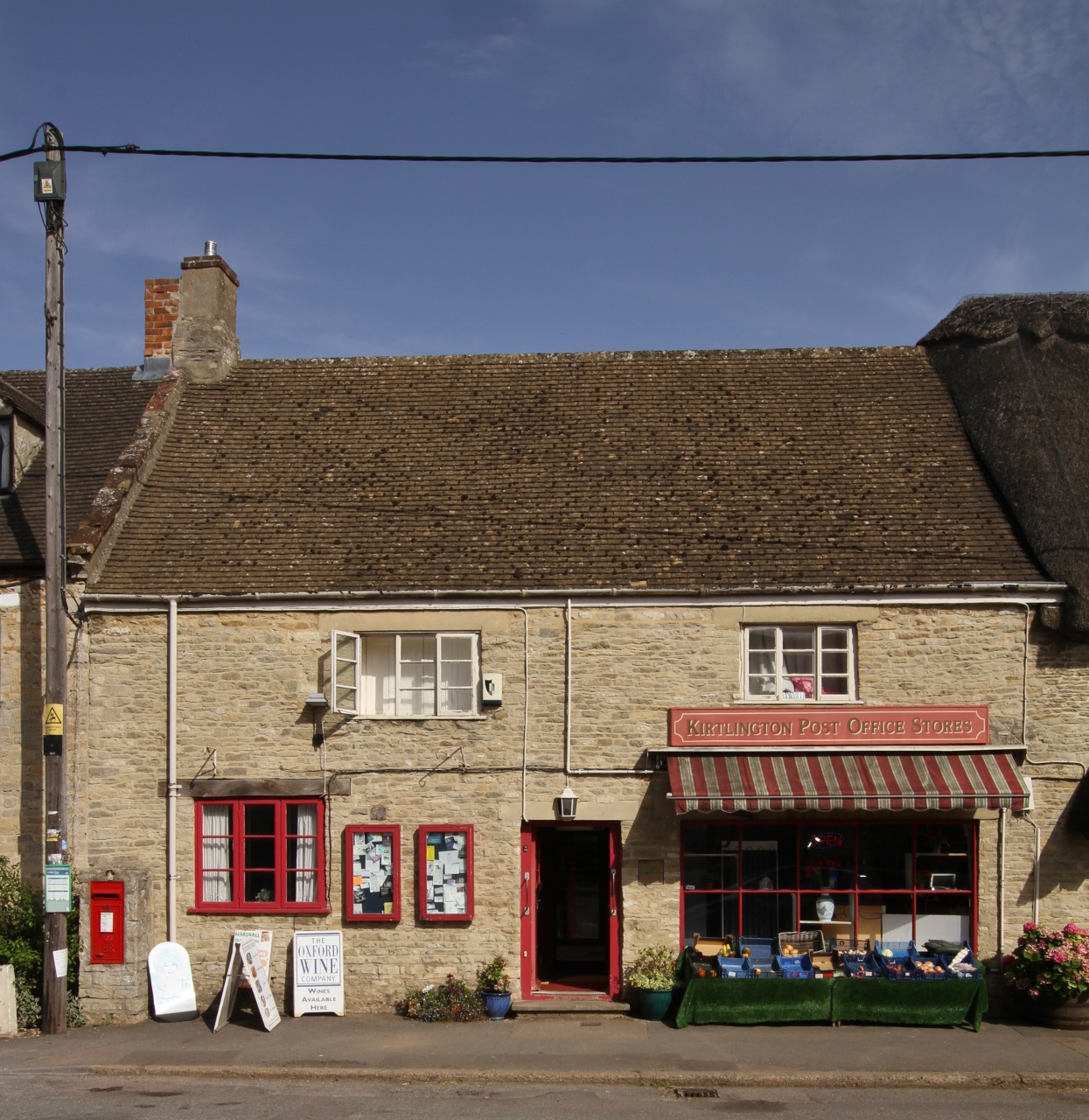
Former sub-Post Office and village store in Troy Lane

Kirtlington has an 18th-century hotel, the Dashwood Hotel and Restaurant, and an 18th- or 19th-century pub, the Oxford Arms. The village used to have a sub-post office and village store, which closed in early 2020.

There was a tea shop by the Oxford Canal at Pigeon Lock. It was open only two Saturdays and Sundays a month, and only from April to October. It is now closed.

Kirtlington has a Women's Institute. Kirtlington Golf Club is about 2/5 mile (1 km) southwest of the village. Kirtlington Football Club plays behind the village hall.

=== Public transport ===
The nearest railway station is Tackley on the Cherwell Valley Line, 1 mile (1.6 km) from Kirtlington.

Grayline bus route 24 serves Kirtlington, linking the village with Oxford via Bletchingdon and Oxford Parkway in one direction and Bicester via Weston-on-the-Green and Wendlebury in the other. Buses run from Mondays to Saturdays, six times a day in each direction. There is no late evening service, and no service on Sundays or bank holidays.

The A4095 road passes through the village, as do the Oxfordshire Way long-distance footpath and the Oxfordshire Cycleway. Junction 9 of the M40 motorway is about 3 miles (5 km) east of the village.

== Bibliography ==
- Benson, Don; Harding, DW (1966). "An Iron Age Site at Kirtlington, Oxon". Oxoniensia. 31. Oxford: Oxford Architectural and Historical Society: 157–161.
- Blair, John (1994). Anglo-Saxon Oxfordshire. Stroud: Alan Sutton Publishing for Oxfordshire Books. pp. 79, 80, 108, 110. ISBN 9-780750-901475.
- Blount, Thomas; Beckwith, Josiah (1679). Fragmenta antiquitatis: antient tenures of land, and jocular customs of some mannors : made publick for the diversion of some, and instruction of others. p. 281.
- Davenport, Paul (1998). The archaeology of a tradition: the revival of the Kirtlington Morris. Mosborough: South Riding Folk Network Publishing. ISBN 0-9529857-4-8.
- Ekwall, Eilert (1960) [1936]. Concise Oxford Dictionary of English Place-Names (4th ed.). Oxford: Oxford University Press. Kirtling. ISBN 0198691033.
- Griffiths, Matthew (1980). "Kirtlington Manor Court, 1500–1650". Oxoniensia. 45. Oxford: Oxfordshire Architectural and Historical Society: 260–283.
- Humphries, Vanadia (1986). Kirtlington: an Oxfordshire village. Chichester: Phillimore & Co. ISBN 0-85033-584-1.
- Laffaye, Horace A (2012). Polo in Britain: A History. Jefferson, NC: McFarland & Company. p. 100.
- Lobel, Mary D, ed. (1959). "Kirtlington". A History of the County of Oxford. Victoria County History. Vol. 6: Ploughley Hundred. London: Oxford University Press for the Institute of Historical Research. pp. 219–232.
- Long, ET (1972). "Mediaeval Wall Paintings in Oxfordshire Churches". Oxoniensia. 37. Oxford: Oxfordshire Architectural and Historical Society: 106–108.
- Shellard, Henry, ed. (1995). Kirtlington: an historical miscellany. Kirtlington: Cyrtla. ISBN 0-9525804-0-3.
- Shellard, Henry, ed. (1996). Kirtlington: a second historical miscellany. Kirtlington: Cyrtla. ISBN 0-9525804-1-1.
- Sherwood, Jennifer; Pevsner, Nikolaus (1974). Oxfordshire. The Buildings of England. Harmondsworth: Penguin Books. pp. 675–678. ISBN 0-14-071045-0.
- Taunt, Henry William (1905). Kirtlington, Oxon... Illustrated with camera and pen. Oxford: Taunt & Co.
- O'Neill, J, ed. (1996). Period Rooms in the Metropolitan Museum of Art . New York: The Metropolitan Museum of Art and the American Federation of Arts. pp. 137–147
