= Derek Eastman =

Derek Eastman may refer to:

- Derek Eastman (ice hockey) (born 1980), American ice hockey player
- Derek Eastman (priest) (1919–1991), priest in the Church of England
