= Robert Newell =

Robert Newell may refer to:

- Robert Newell (VC) (1835–1858), British Army recipient of the Victoria Cross
- Robert Newell (politician) (1807–1869), politician in Oregon, United States
- Robert Henry Newell (1836–1901), American humorist
- Robert Newell (priest) (died 1642), English Anglican priest
