= Upper Heyford, Oxfordshire =

Village in Oxfordshire, England

Coordinates: 51.930°N 1.274°W

Upper Heyford
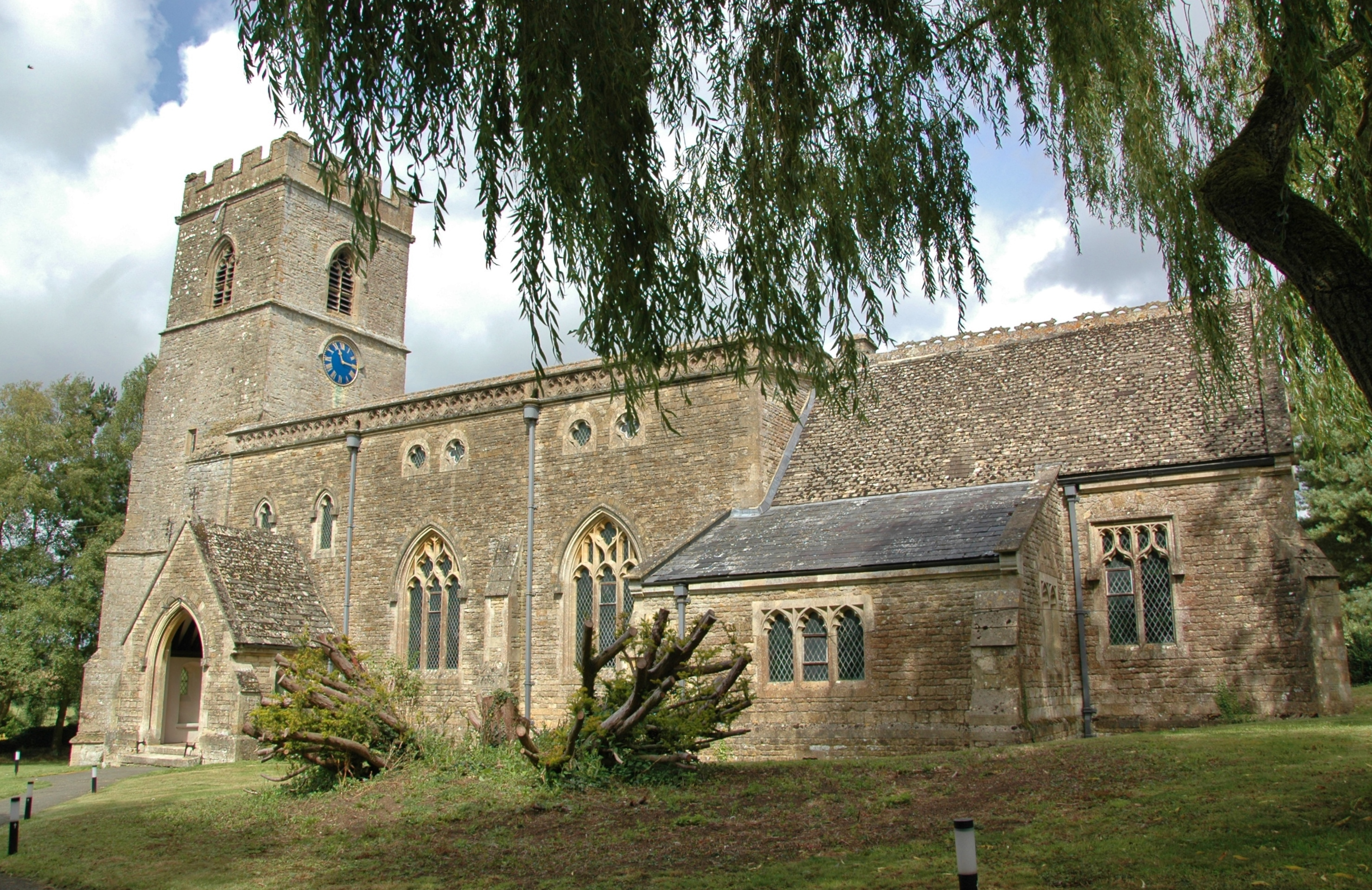
- St Mary's parish church

- Location within Oxfordshire
- Population: 1,295 (2011 Census)
- OS grid reference: SP5026
- Civil parish: Upper Heyford
- District: Cherwell
- Shire county: Oxfordshire
- Region: South East
- Country: England
- Sovereign state: United Kingdom
- Post town: Bicester
- Postcode district: OX25
- Dialling code: 01869
- Police: Thames Valley
- Fire: Oxfordshire
- Ambulance: South Central
- UK Parliament: Bicester and Woodstock
- Website: Upper Heyford

Upper Heyford is a village and civil parish about 6 miles (10 km) northwest of Bicester in Oxfordshire, England. The 2011 Census recorded the parish's population as 1,295.

The village is just east of the River Cherwell. "Upper" distinguishes it from Lower Heyford which is about 1 mile (1.6 km) "lower", downstream along the Cherwell valley. The parish measures about 2 1/2 miles (4 km) east–west and almost 2 miles (3 km) north–south. In 1959 it covered 1,628 acres (659 ha).

The parish's western boundary is just west of the river. Chilgrove Drive, a continuation of Aves ditch, forms part of the parish's eastern boundary. Field boundaries bound the parish on the south. In the north the boundary crosses the former RAF Upper Heyford airfield, following the course of former field boundaries.

== Prehistory ==
The Portway is a pre-Roman road running parallel with the River Cherwell on high ground about 1 mile (1.6 km) east of the river. Its course bisects Upper Heyford parish and passes just east of the village. Part of it forms a minor road to Kirtlington.

== Manor ==
The Domesday Book of 1086 records the village as Haiford, with a manor of 10 hides that was one of the many estates of the Norman baron Robert D'Oyly. Along with many manors of the D'Oyly estate, Heyford became part of the Honour of Wallingford. The manor was tenanted by the de Chesney family until the late 12th century, when Maud de Chesney became married to Henry FitzGerold, chamberlain to Henry II. Maud left the manor to her eldest son Warin, who had succeeded to the manor by 1198 and after whom the village became called Heyford Warren. Warin's daughter Margaret married Baldwin de Redvers, son of William de Redvers, 5th Earl of Devon. Heyford Warren remained with the Earls of Devon and thereby passed to Isabella de Fortibus, Countess of Devon in 1262.

Isabella outlived all her children, so after her death in 1293 her inheritance was disputed between Warin de Lisle and Hugh de Courtenay, who later became 9th Earl of Devon. Warin died in 1296 but his son Robert eventually won seisin of Heyford Warren in 1310, except for two and a half virgates that were awarded to de Courtenay. Robert also received the nearby manor of Fritwell from the Countess's estate. In 1380 his great-grandson, also Robert de Lisle, sold the manor along with some land at Barford St. Michael for £1,000 to William of Wykeham, Bishop of Winchester, who made them part of his endowment for the foundation of New College, Oxford.

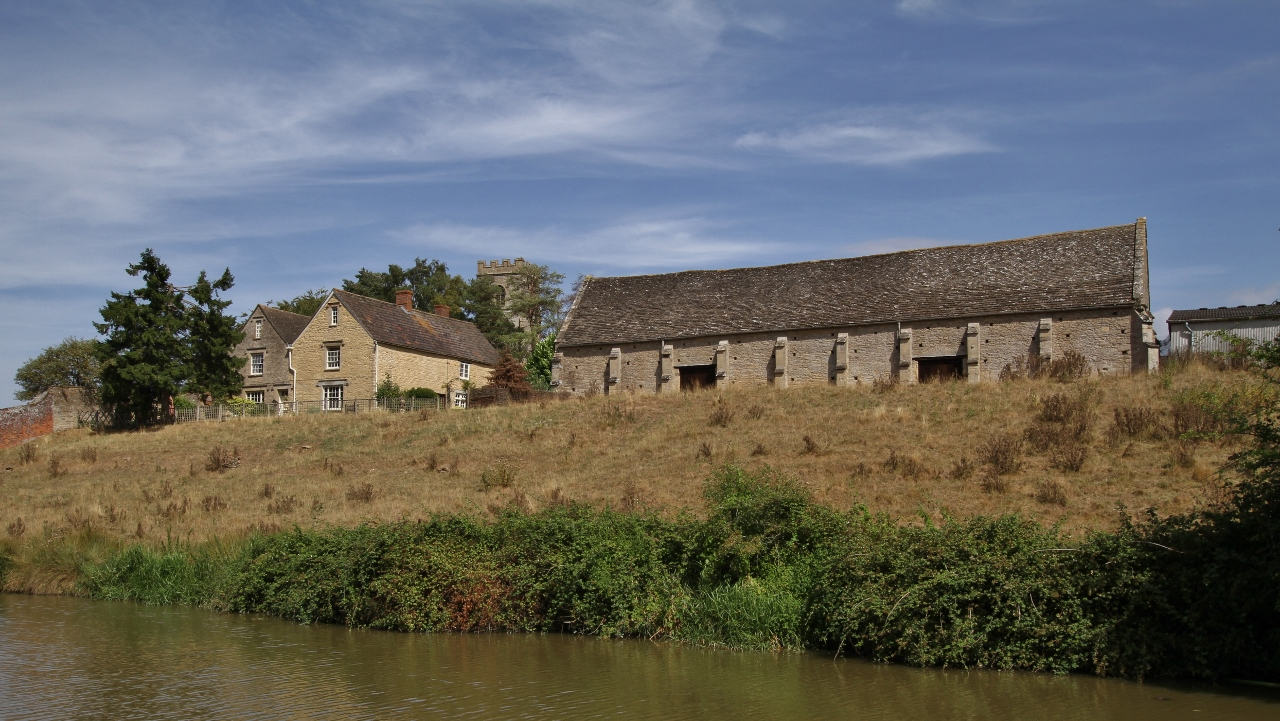
Manor Farm seen from the Oxford Canal. On the left is the 17th-century farmhouse. Centre and right is New College Barn, built about 1400.

In about 1400 or shortly thereafter New College had a tithe barn built at Manor Farm in the village. Its plan is 120 feet (37 m) by 24 feet (7.3 m), it is of nine bays and built of coursed rubble with ashlar quoins and buttresses. The roof is of Stonesfield slate and has raised-cruck trusses. The building has similarities with tithe barns at Swalcliffe and Adderbury, both of which were also built for New College early in the 15th century. It is a scheduled monument and a Grade I listed building.

Upper Heyford's common lands were enclosed in 1842. New College still held the manor in the early 1950s.

== Church and chapels ==
=== Church of England ===
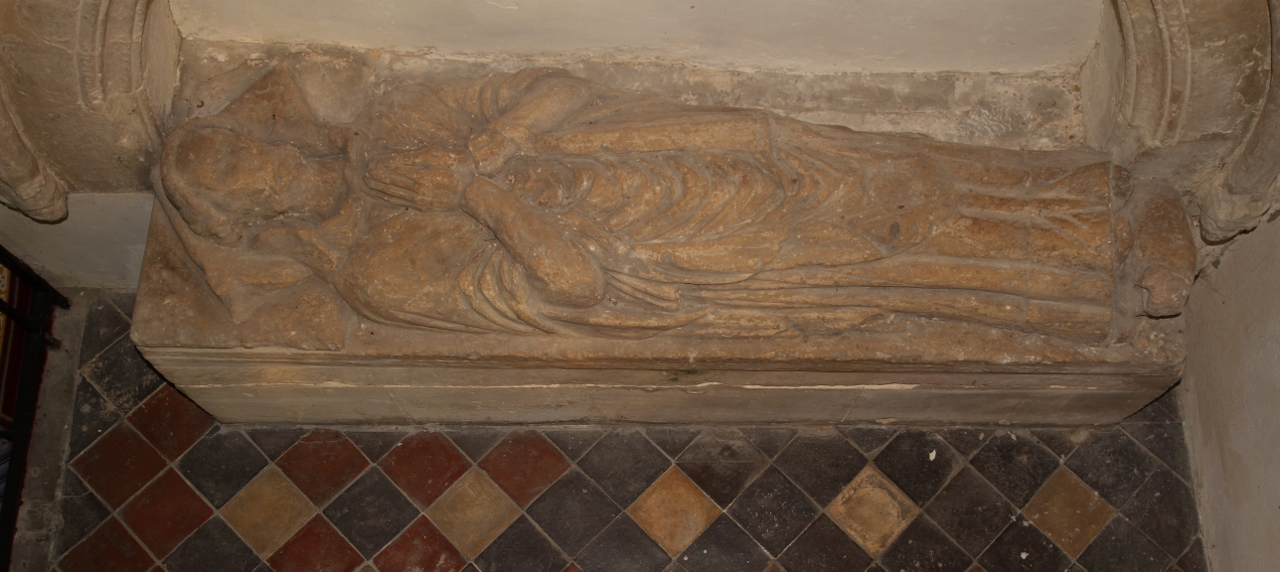
14th-century recumbent effigy of a priest in St Mary's chancel

The village had a church by AD 1074. Inside the current Church of England parish church of St Mary is a 14th-century recumbent effigy of a priest in a 14th-century arched recess in the chancel. The church may have been rebuilt in the latter part of the 15th century, but only the Perpendicular Gothic west tower survives from that time.

Major repairs to the roof and south aisle were made in 1668 and 1769, but by the 1860s the nave and chancel were in a poor condition again. In 1865 the church was demolished except for the west tower. A new church, designed by the architect Thomas Talbot Bury in a Gothic Revival interpretation of Perpendicular Gothic, was built in its place and completed in 1867.

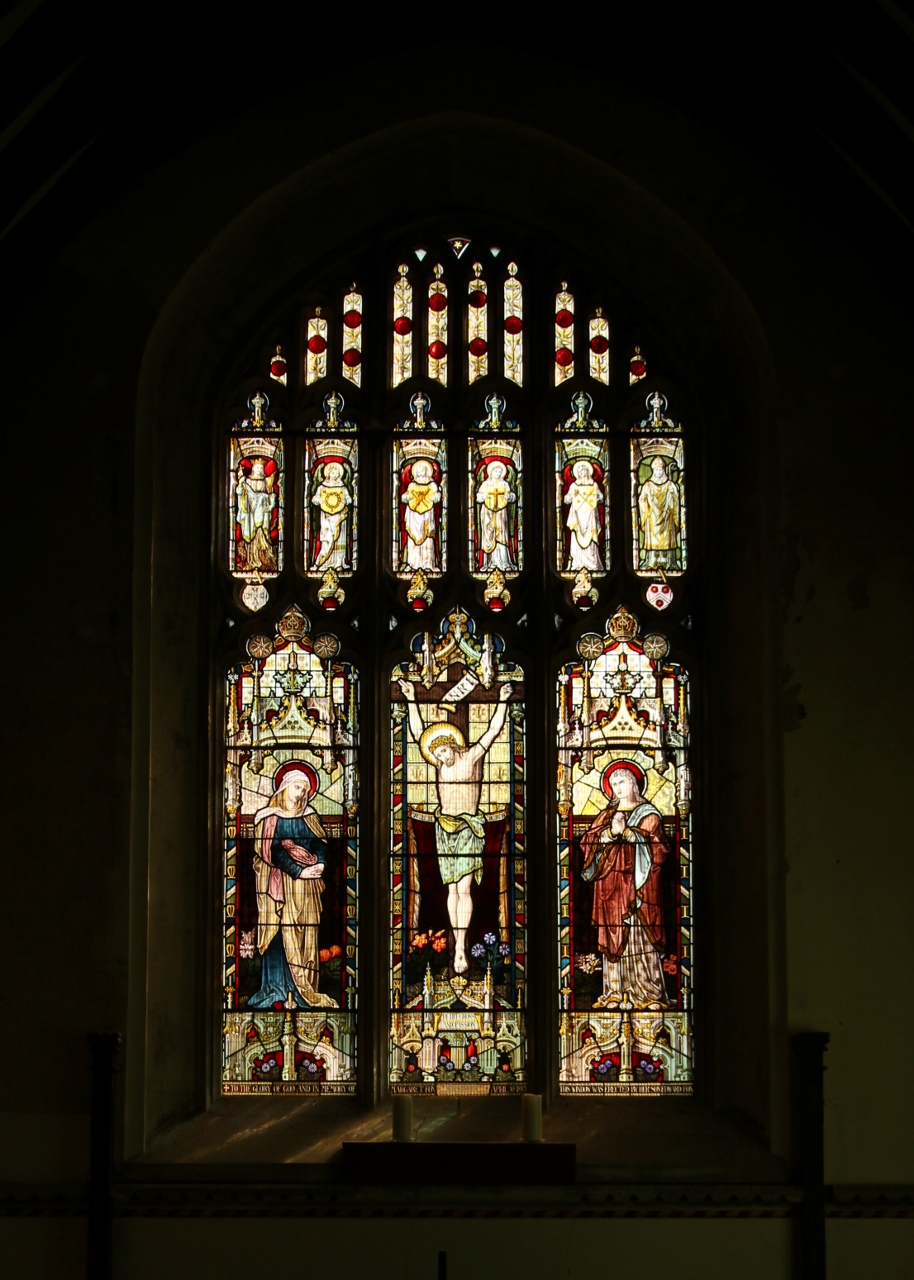
East window of St Mary's chancel

This Victorian building has very regular coursed masonry, which departs conspicuously from the traditional Mediæval rubble masonry of the tower and, presumably, the demolished parts of the previous church. Bury preserved only a handful of features from the Mediæval church: a Perpendicular Gothic window in the north wall of the chancel, a piscina, a tomb recess and a 14th-century effigy of a priest. St Mary's is a Grade II* listed building.

The tower has three bells, the oldest of which is the tenor bell cast in 1624 by Richard I Purdue, who had foundries in places including Glastonbury and Stoford in Somerset. Mears & Stainbank of the Whitechapel Bell Foundry cast the second bell in 1866 and the treble bell in 1946. St Mary's has also a Sanctus bell of unknown date.

St Mary's parsonage was designed by William Wilkinson and built in 1869.

St Mary's parish is now part of the Cherwell Valley Benefice, along with the parishes of Ardley, Fritwell, Lower Heyford, Somerton and Souldern.

=== Methodist chapels ===
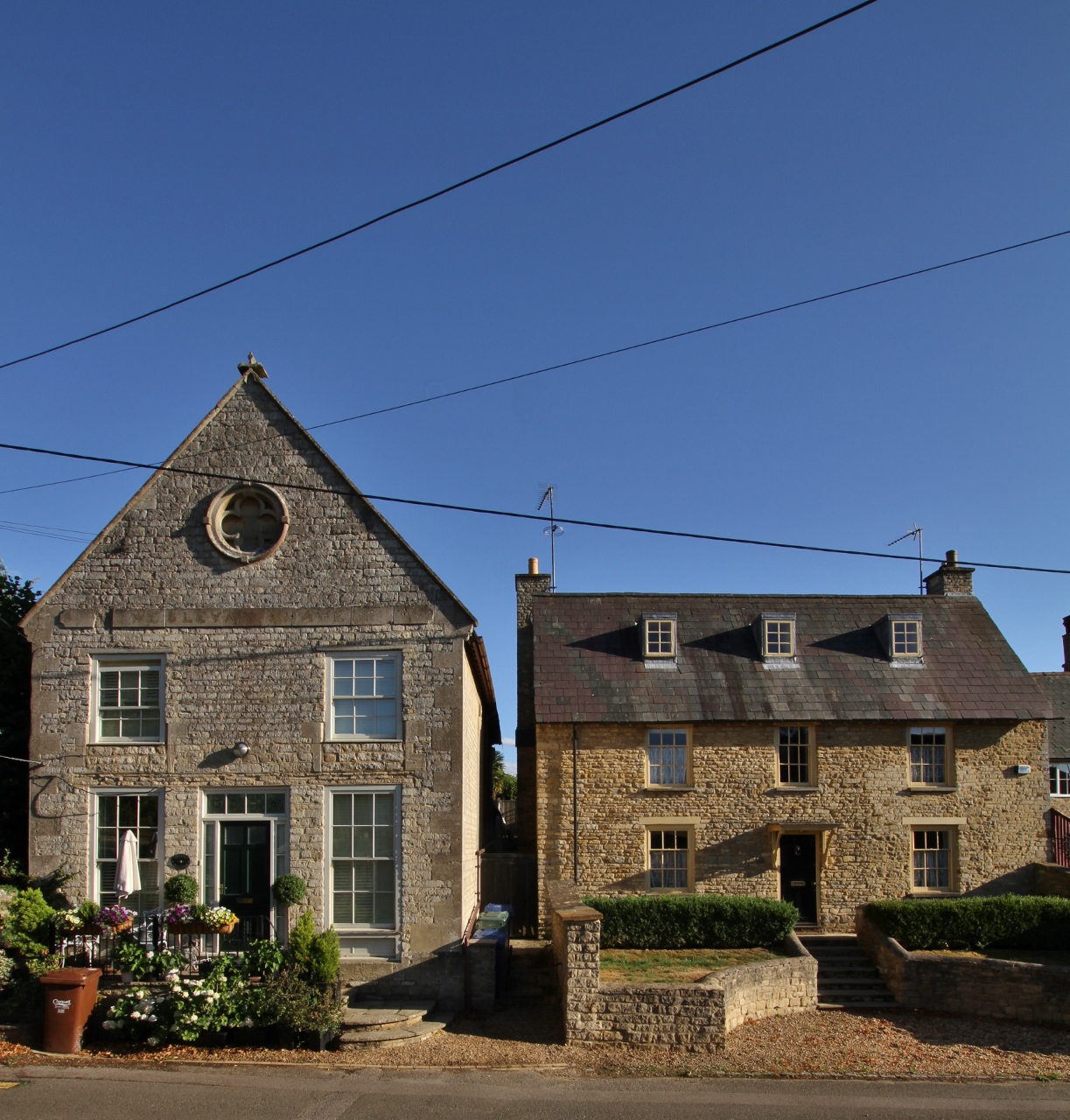
Heyford Galleries (left) and Chapel House (right) in the High Street. Heyford Galleries was built in 1867 as a Wesleyan chapel.

In 1829 a meeting-place for Protestant Dissenters was licensed in Upper Heyford. They may have been Wesleyan Methodists, whose chapel was rebuilt in 1867. By 1955 its congregation had dwindled to three members. It later closed and was converted into a shop. It is now a private house.

In 1849 a second meeting-place was licensed, probably for Reformed Methodists. It was used until the 1880s. In the 1850s and 1860s the Primitive Methodists also had a licensed meeting-place in Upper Heyford.

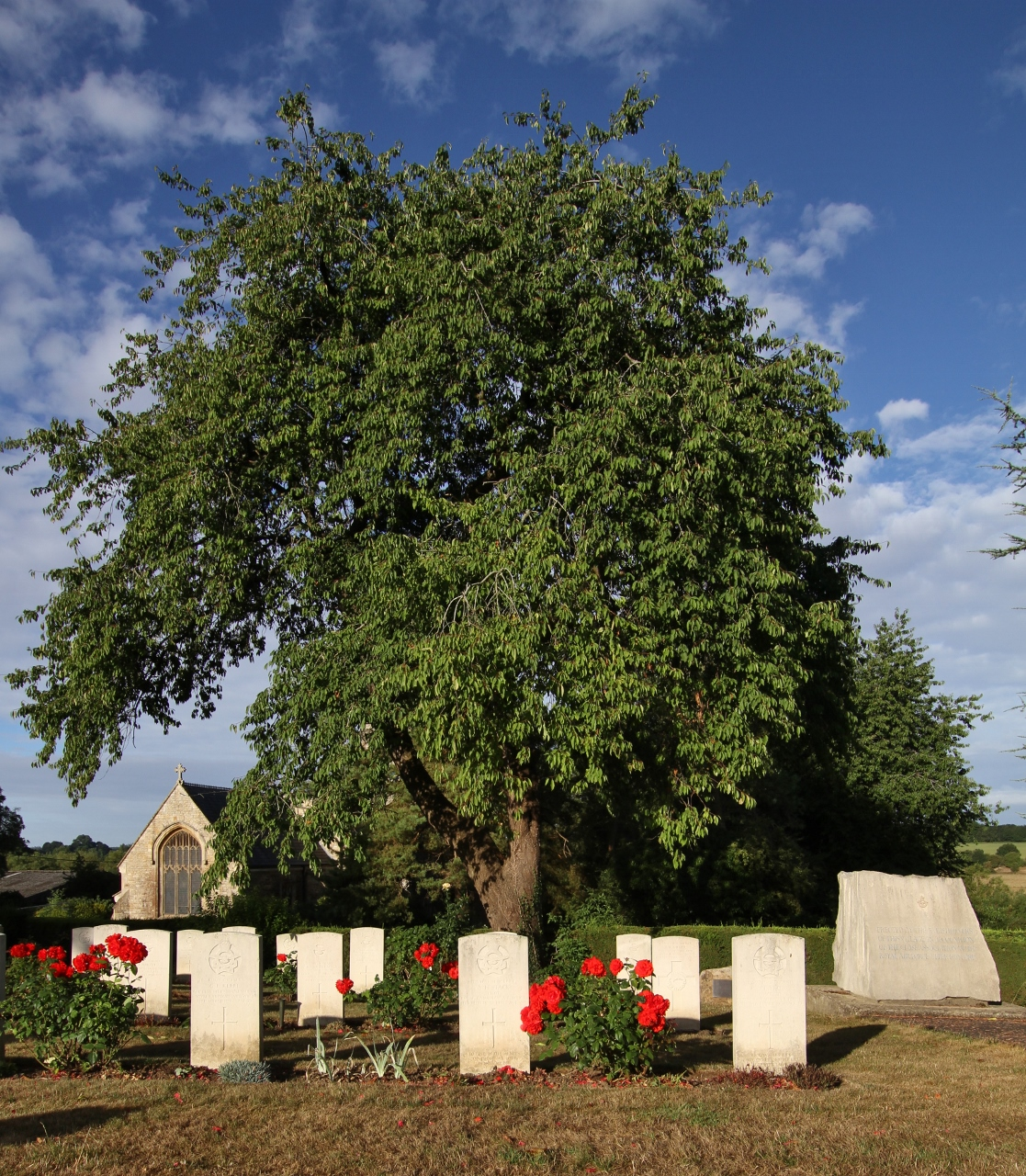
Some of the Allied air forces graves in Upper Heyford cemetery

== Cemetery ==
In 1919 or 1920 a new parish cemetery was opened immediately northeast of St Mary's churchyard, on the opposite side of Church Walk.

In the Second World War an area in the southwest corner of the new cemetery, nearest the church, was reserved for Imperial War Graves Commission burials. 40 airmen from RAF Upper Heyford are now buried here, including eight from the Royal Canadian Air Force and two from the Royal New Zealand Air Force.

Not all RAF Upper Heyford burials are here. Another 26 are in the churchyard of the neighbouring parish of All Saints, Middleton Stoney.

== Economic and social history ==
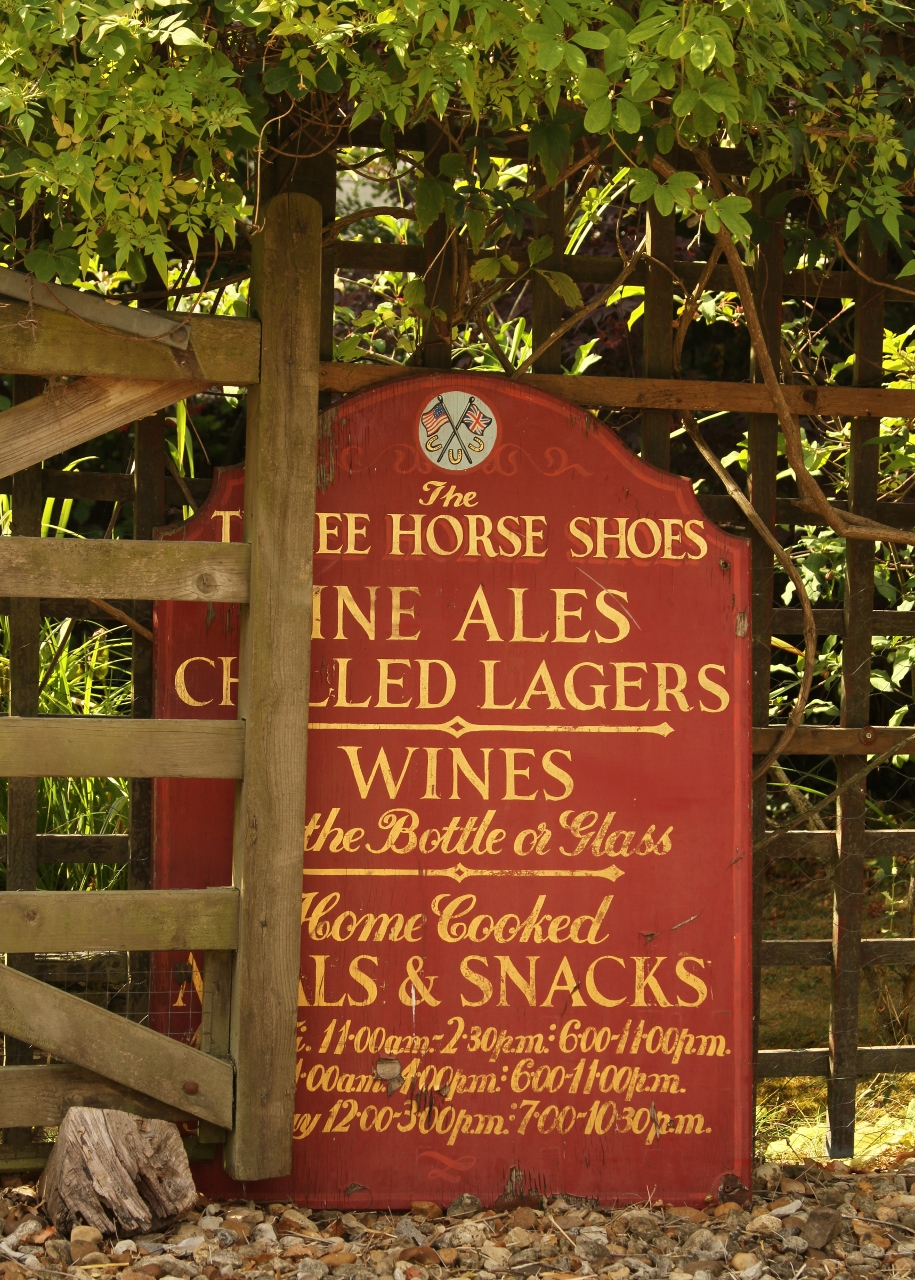
Sign of the former Three Horse Shoes pub

By 1784 Upper Heyford had a pub called the Three Horse Shoes. It was still trading in the 20th century, but is now a private house. After 1887 and in 1951 the village had two pubs. Now only the Barley Mow (see below) is still trading.

In 1787 the Oxford Canal was extended south from Banbury down the Cherwell valley as far as Northbrook near Kirtlington. In so doing it passed through the Upper Heyford parish just west of the village. Allen's Lock on the canal is just north of the village.

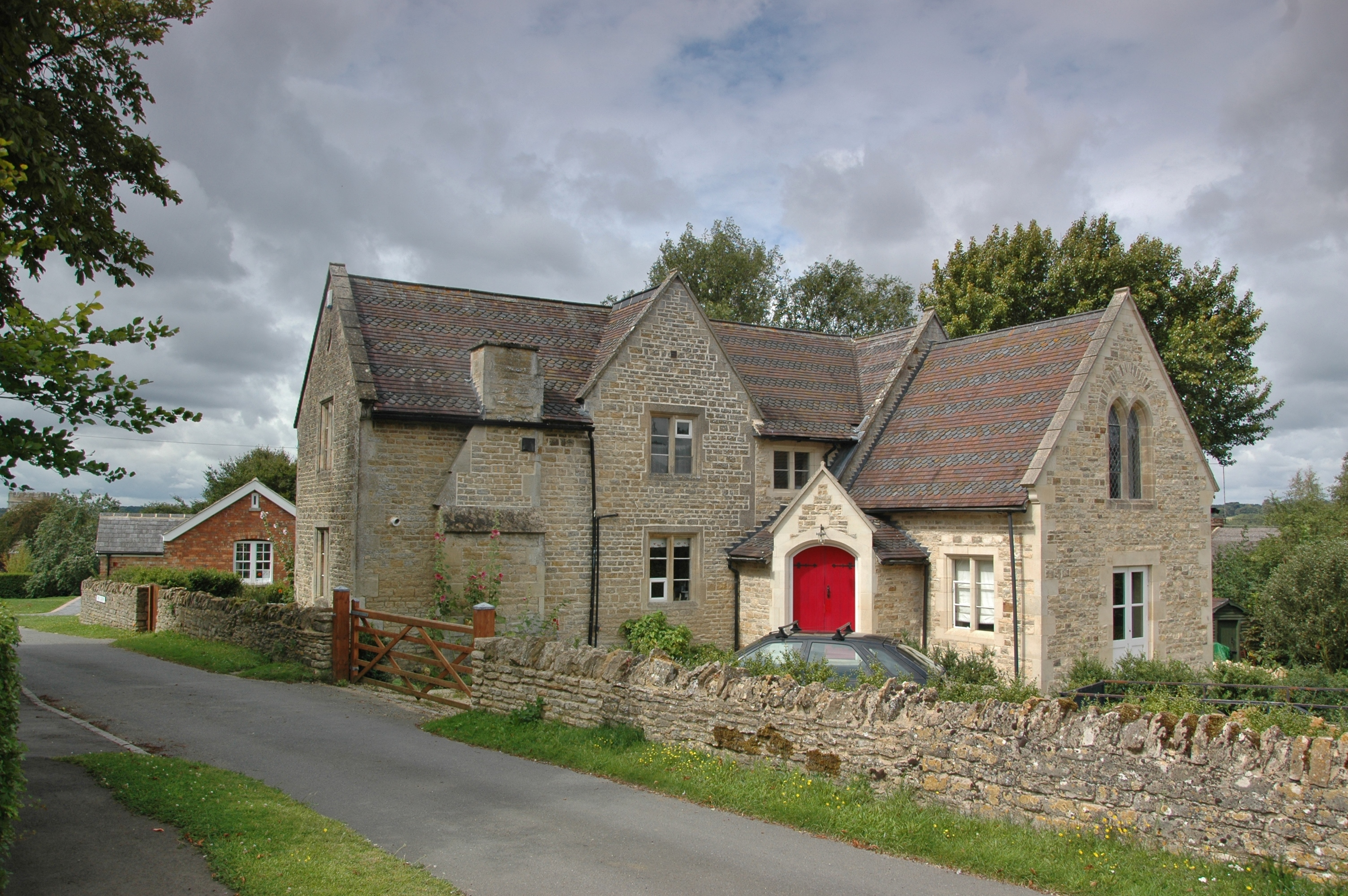
Former Church of England school, built in 1859–61, now closed and converted into a private house

By 1815 Upper Heyford had a small Dame school. It was still operating in 1833 but had ceased by 1854. In 1828 St Mary's parish opened a Sunday school supported by New College. A National School was built and opened in 1859 and enlarged in 1893. In 1925 it was reorganised as a junior school, with senior pupils going to the school at Steeple Aston. The school was still open in 1954 but has since closed. The building is now a private house.

The Oxford and Rugby Railway was authorised in 1845 and its Oxford – Banbury section opened in September 1850. It passes through the northwest corner of Upper Heyford parish, crossing both the River Cherwell and the Oxford Canal.

== RAF Upper Heyford ==
About 1 mile (1.6 km) east of the village is the former RAF Upper Heyford airfield. The RAF used the airfield from the 1920s as a bomber station, then in the 1950s assigned to the USAF. Since its closure in 1994 the airfield has been converted into a substantial industrial and commercial estate. The runway, once the second longest in Europe, is used to store new cars awaiting delivery to dealers. Numerous Cold War relics remain including disused bunkers, water towers, huts and fences. Many of the buildings are now let out as industrial units. An estate of several hundred former MoD houses immediately south of the airfield is being redeveloped as an estate of 700 new homes called Heyford Park.

=== Air crashes ===
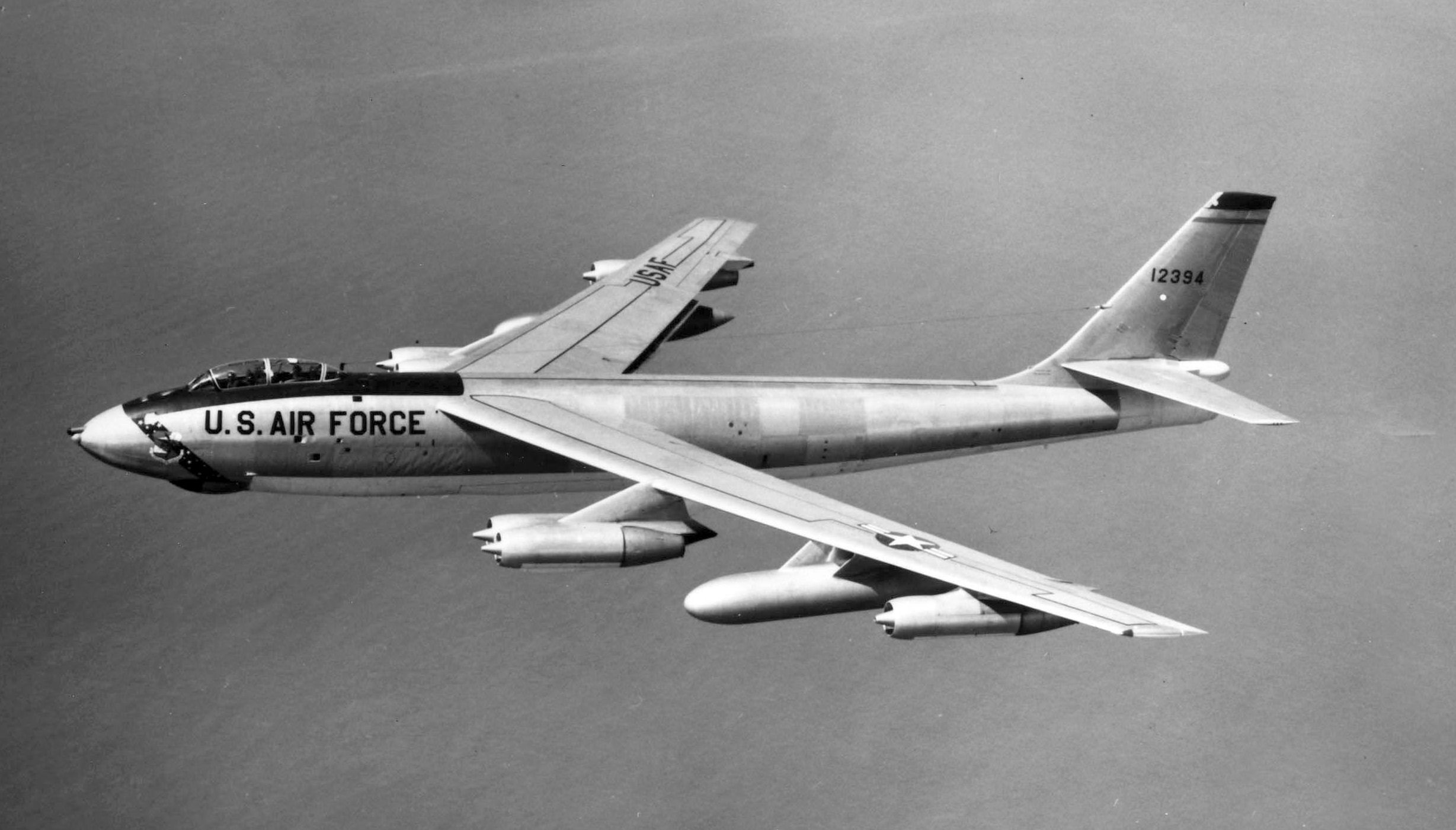
22nd Bombardment Group Boeing B-47 Stratojet similar to one that crashed near the village in 1954

From time to time there were air crashes associated with the air base. Two serious air crashes that happened in Upper Heyford parish were in 1954 and 1992.

In May 1954 a Boeing B-47 Stratojet of the 22nd Bombardment Group crashed in a field about 300 yards (270 m) northwest of the Oxford – Banbury railway line and burst into flames. The aircraft was not carrying bombs, but rounds from its two .50-calibre M2 Browning machine guns exploded in the fire and continued to do so for several hours.

On 17 September 1992 a General Dynamics F-111E of the 55th Fighter Squadron suffered an hydraulic failure on a routine training flight. A controller on the ground at the air base told the two crew to eject. But pilot Jerry Lindh and navigator/weapons systems officer David "Mike" McGuire feared the aircraft could hit either Upper Heyford village or its neighbour North Aston, so they chose to remain with their aircraft to try to control its descent.

A customer of the Three Horse Shoes pub who saw the crash reported "The jet was making a horrible sputtering noise and looked to barely be in control. I can only describe it as a wobbly wing-flapping with the wing tips alternatively going +/- 25-30 degrees with the right wing dipping furthest."

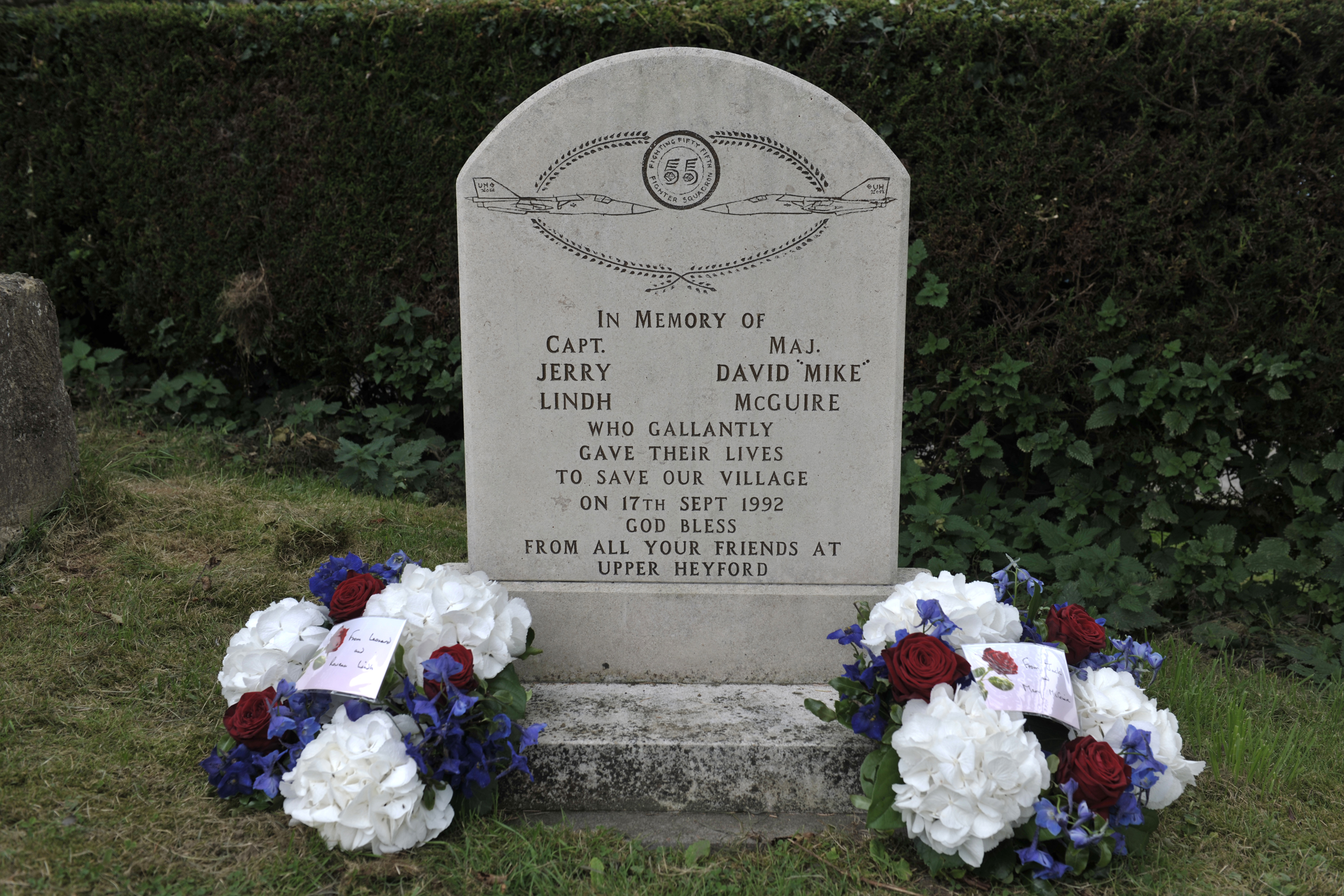
Monument to Captain Lindh and Major McGuire in the air force section of Upper Heyford cemetery

The aircraft was on approach to the airfield's main runway but skimmed Somerton Road, struck the tops of a set of pole-mounted landing lights, ploughed through a hedge, crashed onto the runway and exploded. The landlord of the Barley Mow pub in Somerton Road said "The pub shook and I looked out and saw the aircraft skating across the road in two separate parts. It went through the fence and on to the base and burst into flames."

On the final approach Captain Lindh and Major McGuire did launch their escape pod, but it was entangled in the airfield perimeter fence and both men were killed. Residents paid tribute to the two men for sacrificing themselves to save the village. They paid for a monument to the two men to be made and erected in the air force section of Upper Heyford cemetery.

On 2 April 2022 a plane crashed into an empty newly-built block of flats. The pilot was taken to hospital and no-one else was injured.

== Amenities ==
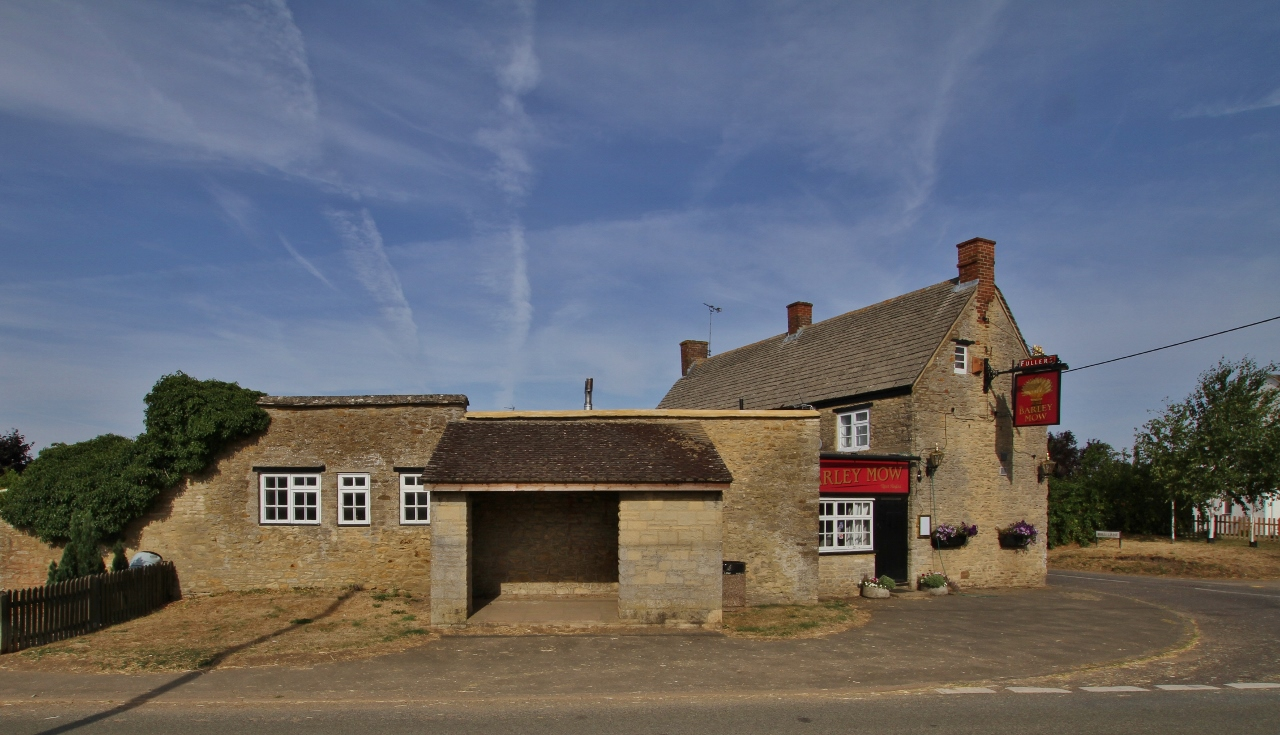
The Barley Mow pub

Upper Heyford has one pub, the Barley Mow. It is controlled by Fuller's Brewery.

The village has a village hall, allotments, sports field, football club and children's playground.

=== Public transport ===
Red Rose Travel bus route 25 serves Upper Heyford, linking the village with Bicester via Middleton Stoney in one direction, and with Lower Heyford in the other. There are bus stops in Camp Road: at the east end of the village near the junction of Somerton Road, and at Heyford Park near the entrance of the former airfield.

Stagecoach also runs bus route 25 serving Upper Heyford, Middleton Stoney, Bicester, Graven Hill, Ambroseden & HMP Bullingdon on Sundays only.

Buses run from Mondays to Saturdays, mostly at hourly intervals. There is no late evening service, and no service on Sundays or bank holidays.

== Climate ==
Unusually for a location in the UK, Upper Heyford has a warm-summer Mediterranean climate using the new averages for 1991–2020. It is one of only two places in the UK with this climate. The other is Woodbridge, Suffolk.

Climate data for Upper Heyford 134m amsl (1991–2020)
Month	Jan	Feb	Mar	Apr	May	Jun	Jul	Aug	Sep	Oct	Nov	Dec	Year
Mean daily maximum °C (°F)	6.8 (44.2)	6.2 (43.2)	10.6 (51.1)	12.2 (54.0)	16.4 (61.5)	18.8 (65.8)	20.8 (69.4)	20.7 (69.3)	17.6 (63.7)	11.5 (52.7)	9.1 (48.4)	6.4 (43.5)	13.1 (55.6)
Daily mean °C (°F)	4.2 (39.6)	3.6 (38.5)	7.3 (45.1)	8.6 (47.5)	12.1 (53.8)	14.5 (58.1)	16.5 (61.7)	16.2 (61.2)	13.7 (56.7)	8.7 (47.7)	6.5 (43.7)	4.1 (39.4)	9.7 (49.4)
Mean daily minimum °C (°F)	1.7 (35.1)	0.9 (33.6)	4.1 (39.4)	5.0 (41.0)	7.7 (45.9)	10.2 (50.4)	12.3 (54.1)	11.7 (53.1)	9.7 (49.5)	5.9 (42.6)	3.8 (38.8)	1.7 (35.1)	6.2 (43.2)
Average rainfall mm (inches)	77.9 (3.07)	16.1 (0.63)	29.2 (1.15)	46.3 (1.82)	70.7 (2.78)	22.6 (0.89)	53.2 (2.09)	36.9 (1.45)	50.4 (1.98)	65.1 (2.56)	38.9 (1.53)	62.1 (2.44)	569.4 (22.39)
Average rainy days (≥ 1.0 mm)	11.3	4.7	8.0	7.5	6.3	5.9	7.3	6.7	6.9	6.3	5.5	6.4	82.8
Source: Meteoclimat

== Bibliography ==
- Blomfield, James Charles (1892). Part VI: History of Upper and Lower Heyford. Deanery of Bicester. London: Elliot Stock & Co.
- Compton, Hugh J (1976). The Oxford Canal. Newton Abbot: David & Charles. p. 37. ISBN 0-7153-7238-6.
- Baggs, AP; Colvin, Christina; Colvin, HM; Cooper, Janet; Day, CJ; Selwyn, Nesta; Tomkinson, A (1983). "Deddington". In Crossley, Alan (ed.). A History of the County of Oxford. Victoria County History. Vol. 11: Wootton Hundred (northern part). London: Oxford University Press for the Institute of Historical Research. pp. 81–120. ISBN 978-0-19722-758-9.
- Lobel, Mary D, ed. (1959). "Upper Heyford". A History of the County of Oxford. Victoria County History. Vol. 6: Ploughley Hundred. London: Oxford University Press for the Institute of Historical Research. pp. 196–205.
- Sherwood, Jennifer; Pevsner, Nikolaus (1974). Oxfordshire. The Buildings of England. Harmondsworth: Penguin Books. pp. 820–821. ISBN 0-14-071045-0.
- Wing, William (1865). Annals of Heyford Warren, otherwise Upper Heyford. Oxford.
