= Cecil Bourke =

British priest (1841–1910)

Cecil Frederick Joseph Bourke (1 September 1841 – 15 April 1910) was the Archdeacon of Buckingham from 1895 until his death.

Bourke was educated at Corpus Christi College, Oxford and ordained in 1865. He began his ordained ministry as a curate at Newbury after which he was the rector of Middleton Stoney before becoming the incumbent of St Giles' Reading. From 1895 to 1910 he was the rector and sub-dean of St Mary's Cathedral, Truro, a position he held until his move to Buckingham.
