= Anne Gell =

British Church of England priest (born 1963)

Anne Elizabeth Gell (born 1963) is a British Church of England priest.

== Biography ==
Gell was educated at St Hugh's College, Oxford and the Royal Free Hospital School of Medicine. After several years working as a doctor she studied for ordination through the Southern Theological Education and Training Scheme. After a curacy at All saints, Headley, Surrey she was the Vicar of Wrecclesham from 2005, Area Dean of Farnham from 2010, and Archdeacon of Wells from 2015 to 2023, and Acting Dean of Wells from 2023 to 2024.

Church of England titles
Preceded by Nicola Sullivan	Archdeacon of Wells; 2017–present	Incumbent
