= Guy Elsmore =

British Anglican priest

The Venerable Guy Elsmore
- Archdeacon of Buckingham
- Church: Church of England
- Diocese: Diocese of Oxford
- In office: July 2016 to present
- Predecessor: Karen Gorham

Orders
- Ordination: 1993 (deacon); 1994 (priest)

Personal details
- Born: Guy Charles Elsmore; 1966 (age 59–60) Sutton Coldfield, Birmingham, England
- Denomination: Anglicanism
- Education: University of Edinburgh; Ridley Hall, Cambridge

Guy Charles Elsmore (born 1966) is a British Anglican priest. Since July 2016, he has served as the Archdeacon of Buckingham in the Diocese of Oxford.

== Early life and education ==
Elsmore was born in 1966 in Sutton Coldfield, Birmingham, England. He studied physics at the University of Edinburgh, graduating with a Bachelor of Science (BSc) degree in 1988. Having completed his undergraduate degree, he moved to Liverpool where he worked with the homeless. He then entered Ridley Hall, Cambridge, an Open Evangelical Anglican theological college, to train for ordained ministry. His training was completed by 1993, and that year he left the college to be ordained in the Church of England.

== Ordained ministry ==
Elsmore was ordained in the Church of England as a deacon in 1993 and as a priest in 1994. He then ministered in the Diocese of Liverpool until his appointment as archdeacon. From 1993 to 1998, he served his curacy a St Michael's Church, Huyton. He was then Vicar of the Parish of St Basil and All Saints, Hough Green, Widnes: this is a joint Church of England/Roman Catholic parish. He was also Area Dean of Widnes between 2003 and 2005.

In 2005, Elsmore was made Priest-in-Charge of the St Luke in the City Team in Liverpool. This benefice contains three parish churches: St Michael's Church, Upper Pitt Street; St Bride's Church, Percy Street; and the Church of St Dunstan, Edge Hill. In 2010, he was made Team Rector of the benefice. From 2014 to 2016, he also served as the Area Dean of Toxteth and Wavertree. On 2 February 2014, he was made an honorary canon of Liverpool Cathedral.

In May 2016, it was announced that Elsmore would be the next Archdeacon of Buckingham in the Diocese of Oxford. On 18 July 2016, he was welcomed and collated as archdeacon during a service at Christ Church Cathedral, Oxford.

=== Views ===
In July 2013, Elsmore was elected General Secretary of Modern Church, an organisation that promotes Liberal Christianity. In October 2016, he resigned as General Secretary due to his appointment as Archdeacon of Buckingham. As of 2016, he is a novice of the Third Order of the Society of St Francis (TSSF).

== Personal life ==
Elsmore is married to Petra. She is an Anglican priest and chaplain.

== Styles ==
For further information on forms of address ("styles") traditionally given to clergy of the Church of England, see Crockford's Clerical Directory and forms of address in the United Kingdom.
Regardless of their formal style(s), a person may choose which styles to use or not use.

- Guy Elsmore (1966–1993)
- The Reverend Guy Elsmore (1993–2 February 2014)
- The Reverend Canon Guy Elsmore (2 February 2014 – 18 July 2016)
- The Venerable Guy Elsmore (18 July 2016 – present)
