= Nicola Sullivan =

The Very Reverend Nicola Sullivan
- Dean of Southwell
- Diocese: Diocese of Southwell and Nottingham
- In office: 2016–2024
- Predecessor: John Guille
- Successor: Stephen Evans
- Other posts: Bishop's chaplain (2002–2007); Sub-Dean of Wells Cathedral (2003–2007); Archdeacon of Wells (2007–2016)

Orders
- Ordination: 1995 (deacon); 1996 (priest)

Personal details
- Born: 15 August 1958 (age 68)
- Denomination: Anglican
- Education: Wycliffe Hall, Oxford

Nicola Ann Sullivan (born 15 August 1958) is a British Church of England priest who was Dean of Southwell from 2016 to 2024, having previously been Archdeacon of Wells from 2007 to 2016.

== Early life and education ==
Sullivan was born on 15 August 1958, and brought up in Suffolk. She qualified as a nurse in 1981 and a midwife in 1984, after which she worked both in the United Kingdom and, with Tearfund, in Swaziland and Ethiopia. She trained for ordained ministry at Wycliffe Hall, Oxford, graduating with a Bachelor of Theology (BTh) degree in 1995.

== Ordained ministry ==
Sullivan was ordained in the Church of England as a deacon in 1995 and as a priest in 1996. Her clerical career began with a curacy at St Anne's Church in Earlham near Norwich. In 1999 she took up the post of associate vicar at Bath Abbey and became chaplain to the Bishop of Bath and Wells in 2002. She was made Sub-Dean of Wells Cathedral in 2003.

Sullivan was appointed Archdeacon of Wells and a Canon Residentiary of Wells Cathedral in 2007. The role of archdeacon involves oversight of 200 parishes in the eastern half of the county of Somerset.

In 2013, Sullivan was elected as one of eight senior women clergy, called "regional representatives", to attend meetings of the House of Bishops, one of the three chambers of the General Synod of the Church of England, the church's legislature. As regional representative for the south-west of England (comprising the dioceses of Truro, Salisbury, Bath & Wells, Gloucester, Bristol and Exeter), she attended meetings of the house in a speaking, but non-voting, capacity until such time as six women sit as full members of the house. She stepped down from the role in 2016, after the first women bishops had been appointed.

On 4 April 2016, it was announced that Sullivan was to become Dean of Southwell. She was installed during a service at Southwell Minster on 17 September 2016. She stepped down as dean in 2024, with a farewell service held at Southwell Cathedral on 29 September.

Church of England titles
Preceded by Peter Maurice	Archdeacon of Wells; 2007–2016	Succeeded by Anne Gell
Preceded by John Guille	Dean of Southwell; 2016–2024	Succeeded by Stephen Evans
