= Mayflower High School =

Location
- Stock Road; Billericay, Essex, CM12 0RT; England; 51°38′24″N 0°25′52″E

Information
- Type: Academy
- Established: 1965
- Department for Education URN: 137048 Tables
- Ofsted: Reports
- Gender: Coeducational
- Age: 11 to 18
- Enrolment: 1,620 (as of Dec 2025)
- Houses: 5: Blake, Fry, Lister, Marconi, Russell
- Website: "Mayflower High School".

Mayflower High School, founded in 1965, and named after the Mayflower ship, is a coeducational, secondary school located in Billericay, Essex in the East of England in the United Kingdom. The school has a mixed intake of pupils aged 11–18 (School years 7 to 13) and is an academy. As of Dec 2025 the number of enrolled pupils was 1,620. Mayflower has specialisms in science and mathematics as well as languages.

The headteacher since June 2024 is Damian Lee.

A house on site facilitates the staying of language assistants, natives of either Germany, Spain or France, to assist students with their language studies, and all three subjects are complemented by trips to the relevant country, previous trips having sent students to Santander and Barcelona.

== Notable former pupils ==
- Karen Gorham, Bishop of Sherborne in the Church of England
