= John Longland (priest) =

English priest

John Longland was a 16th century English priest.

Longland was educated at Brasenose College, Oxford. He was Archdeacon of Buckingham from 1559 until his death in 1589.
