= Giles Thorne =

Anglican priest

The Venerable Giles Thorne, DD (1595, Dorset–25 June 1671, Bedford) was an Anglican priest in England.

Thorne was educated at Balliol College, Oxford. He held livings at Dunstable, Northampton and Bedford Thorne was Archdeacon of Buckingham from 1660 until his death.

Previously a protégé of Bishop John Williams, Giles Thorne had been ejected from Oxford in 1631 by William Laud himself after preaching against altars from The Diary of Robert Woodford, 1637–1641

IN 30 Aug 1642 Parliament Committed Gyles Thorne to the Fleet (prison).

== Notes ==
HL/PO/JO/10/1/132 – The National Archives
