= John Guille =

The Very Reverend John Guille
- Dean of Southwell
- Diocese: Diocese of Southwell and Nottingham
- In office: 2007–2014
- Predecessor: David Leaning
- Successor: Nicola Sullivan

Orders
- Ordination: 1977

Personal details
- Born: 23 May 1949 (age 77)
- Denomination: Anglican
- Children: Three
- Education: Guernsey Grammar School

John Guille (born 23 May 1949) is a Church of England priest. He was Dean of Southwell from 2007 until 2014.

== Early life ==
Guille was born on 23 May 1949. He was educated at Guernsey Grammar School, then an all-boys grammar school in Guernsey. He had a brief career as a teacher.

== Ordained ministry ==
Guille was ordained in 1977. He was a Curate at Chandler's Ford then Priest in charge of St John, Bournemouth and after that Rector of St André de la Pommeraye, Guernsey. He was Archdeacon of Basingstoke then Winchester (the same job renamed) and a Canon Residentiary at its cathedral until his elevation to the Deanery. He served as Dean of Southwell from 2007 until his retirement on 30 June 2014.
