= Thomas Tuttebury =

Dean of Wells

Thomas Tuttebury was the Dean of Wells at the beginning of the fifteenth century. He was also simultaneously Archdeacon of Buckingham.

In 1392 the king appointed him to Maidstone Rectory; and in 1400 he was the incumbent at Aston Clinton. He was appointed Archdeacon of Wells in 1391 and Dean of Wells in 1401 (until 1410). On 14 September 1402 the Roman Catholic Church attempted to expel him from his deanery, which the Calendar of Patent Rolls saw as ”contempt of the king and a weakening of his laws" In that same year he was also vicar of St. Michael's Church, Coventry. and collated Archdeacon of Buckingham (until c.1403). In 1405 he is mentioned in a royal petition as being the treasurer of the king's household.
