= John Hillersdon =

British priest

The Venerable John Hillersdon was an Anglican priest in England during the 17th century.

Hill was born in Stoke Hammond and educated at Corpus Christi College, Oxford. He held livings at Odstock and Castle Ashby. Hillerson was Archdeacon of Buckingham from 1671 until his death 1 November 1684.
