= Derek Eastman (priest) =

The Venerable Derek Eastman

Archdeacon of Buckingham
- In office 1970–1977

Personal details
- Born: 22 January 1919
- Died: 7 January 1991 (aged 71)
- Spouse: Judith Mary née Miller

Derek Ian Tennent Eastman (22 January 1919 – 7 January 1991) was a priest in the Church of England.

Eastman was educated at Winchester College, Christ Church, Oxford and Ripon College Cuddesdon. After World War II service with the Coldstream Guards he was ordained in 1948. Following a curacy at Brighouse he was priest in charge of St Andrew's Caversham. He held incumbencies at Headington and Banbury and was the Archdeacon of Buckingham from 1970 to 1977.

Religious titles
Preceded by John Pratt	Archdeacon of Buckingham; 1970–1977	Succeeded by John Bone
