= Erasmus Webb =

Canon of Windsor (died 1614)

Erasmus Webb B.D. (d. 24 March 1614) was a Canon of Windsor, England from 1590 to 1614

== Career ==
He was educated at Gloucester Hall, Oxford where he graduated BA in 1568, MA in 1572 and BD in 1585.

He was appointed:

- Vicar of St Clears, Carmarthen 1577
- Rector of Ham, Wiltshire 1582
- Rector of Bletchingdon, Oxfordshire 1583
- Archdeacon of Buckingham 1589
- Rector of West Ilsley, Berkshire 1601–1613

He was appointed to the ninth stall in St George's Chapel, Windsor Castle in 1590, a position he held until 1614.

He was buried in the chapel. His inscription read:

"Hic jacet Erasmus Webb, Sacrae Theologiae Baccalaureus, cujus Regiae Capallae quondam Canonicus, qui obit 24 die Martii, Anno Domini 1613. Aetatis suae 63”
