= Karen Gorham =

British Anglican bishop (born 1964)

The Right Reverend Karen Gorham FRSA
- Bishop of Sherborne
- Church: Church of England
- Diocese: Diocese of Salisbury
- In office: February 2016–present
- Other posts: Archdeacon of Buckingham (2007–2016); Acting Bishop of Salisbury (2021–2022)

Orders
- Ordination: 2 July 1995 (deacon) by John Habgood; 1996 (priest)
- Consecration: 24 February 2016 by Justin Welby

Personal details
- Born: 25 June 1964 (age 62)
- Denomination: Anglicanism
- Education: Mayflower High School
- Alma mater: University of Bristol; Trinity College, Bristol

Karen Marisa Gorham (born 24 June 1964) is a British Church of England bishop. Since February 2016, she has been the Bishop of Sherborne, a suffragan bishop in the Diocese of Salisbury. Since April 2026 she is also acting Bishop of Salisbury, a role she had previously held from 2021 to 2022. From 2007 to 2016, she was the Archdeacon of Buckingham in the Diocese of Oxford.

== Early life and education ==
Gorham was born on 24 June 1964. She was educated at Mayflower High School, a state school in Billericay, Essex. She studied for a Bachelor of Arts degree at the University of Bristol and graduated in 1995. She trained for ordained ministry at Trinity College, Bristol, an Anglican theological college in the evangelical tradition.

== Ordained ministry ==
Gorham was ordained in the Church of England as a deacon at Petertide 1995 (2 July) by John Habgood, Archbishop of York, at York Minster, and as a priest in 1996. From 1995 to 1999, she served her curacy in the parish of Northallerton with Kirby Sigston in the Diocese of York.

Gorham then moved to the Diocese of Canterbury and was priest in charge of St Paul's Church, Maidstone, from 1999 to 2007. She additionally held two appointments during this time, as the Assistant Director of Ordinands from 2002 and the Area Dean of Maidstone from 2003. In 2006, she was appointed an honorary canon of Canterbury Cathedral.

In 2007, Gorham moved to the Diocese of Oxford to become the new Archdeacon of Buckingham. On 6 October 2007, she was inaugurated as archdeacon at All Saints Church, High Wycombe, by Alan Wilson, Bishop of Buckingham. She stepped down as archdeacon on 19 January 2016 in preparation for her consecration to the episcopate.

=== Episcopal ministry ===
On 26 November 2015, it was announced that Gorham was to be next Bishop of Sherborne, a suffragan bishop in the Diocese of Salisbury. On 24 February 2016, she was consecrated a bishop by Justin Welby, Archbishop of Canterbury, at Westminster Abbey. On 6 March 2016, she was welcomed into the diocese during a service at Sherborne Abbey.

In the vacancy following Nick Holtam's retirement on 3 July 2021, Gorham additionally served as acting diocesan bishop (acting Bishop of Salisbury) until Stephen Lake was inaugurated on 19 June 2022. After Lake stepped back from his duties in April 2026, she again took up the acting bishop role.

=== Views ===
In November 2023, she was one of 44 Church of England bishops who signed an open letter supporting the use of the Prayers of Love and Faith (i.e. blessings for same-sex couples) and called for "Guidance being issued without delay that includes the removal of all restrictions on clergy entering same-sex civil marriages, and on bishops ordaining and licensing such clergy".

== Publications ==
- Naturism and Christianity: Are They Compatible?. Grove Books. 2000. ISBN 978-1-85174-438-1. with Dave Leal. (Note: Gorham was brought up in a naturist home. Although not a naturist herself, she is a supporter of the movement. Her parents are still very involved in the naturist movement.)

== Honours ==
In 2012, Gorham was elected a Fellow of the Royal Society of Arts (FRSA).

== Styles ==
For further information on forms of address ("styles") traditionally given to clergy of the Church of England, see Crockford's Clerical Directory and forms of address in the United Kingdom.
Regardless of their formal style(s), a person may choose which styles to use or not use.

- The Reverend Karen Gorham (1995–2006)
- The Reverend Canon Karen Gorham (2006–2007)
- The Venerable Karen Gorham (2007-2016)
- The Right Reverend Karen Gorham (2016–present)

== Notes ==
Religious titles
| Preceded by Sheila Watson | Archdeacon of Buckingham; 2007–2016 | Succeeded by Guy Elsmore |
| Preceded by Graham Kings | Bishop of Sherborne; 2016–present | Incumbent |
