= Archdeacon of Buckingham =

Church of England ecclesiastical office

The Archdeacon of Buckingham is the senior ecclesiastical officer in charge of the Church of England in Buckinghamshire.

The archdeacon has statutory oversight over the ancient Archdeaconry of Buckingham, which has existed since (at latest) the 11th century and was, until 1837, in the Diocese of Lincoln. On 18 August 1837, an Order in Council transferred the archdeaconry to the Diocese of Oxford. The archdeacon has some disciplinary supervision and pastoral care of the clergy in the archdeaconry.

== List of archdeacons ==
Archdeacons of Buckingham
From	Until	Incumbent	Notes
bef May 1092	c. 1100	Alfred Parvus	
c. 1100	1119	Gilbert	Gislebert.
1119	October 1129	Roger de Clinton	
c. 1130	aft 1140	Richard de Urville	
bef 1142	1176–September 1177	David	Brother to Alexander of Lincoln.
c. 1180	aft 25 August 1189	Robert de Burnham	
c. 1194	aft September 1202	Stephen de Swafeld	
aft September 1202	bef 1206	Roger	
bef 10 May 1206	25 August 1218	William de Blois	
bef 11 April 1219	bef 25 December 1221	William	
bef 25 December 1221	6 September 1269	Matthew Stratton	
6 September 1269	bef 22 April 1290	Percival de Lavinia	
11 July 1290	bef 10 March 1299	Richard de St Frideswide	
11 March 1299	28 April or June 1319	Boniface of Saluzzo	Became Precentor of Salisbury.
28 April or June 1319	28 June 1322	George of Saluzzo	Previously Precentor of Salisbury.
28 June 1322	30 October 1322	Roger Waltham	
30 October 1322	July 1333	George of Saluzzo	
7 July 1333	July or August 1350	Cardinal Annibale di Ceccano	
12 January 1351	12 March 1351	John Belveys	John Bulneys.
12 March 1351	22 April 1352	John Herring de Ashbourn	John Hervey of Asbourne.
22 April 1352	11 December 1367	William de Ginewell	William Gynewell.
1 August 1367	1367	John Skyret	Died before fully taking office.
1367	6 December 1367	Henry Piel	Deposed in favour of Ginewell before taking office.
6 December 1367	30 November 1380	William de Ginewell (again)	William Gynewell.
30 November 1380	1 July 1392	John Evot	
28 February 1390	25 September 1391	John Stacy	Ineffective royal grant.
25 September 1391	1 July 1392	William Aston	Ineffective royal grant.
1 July 1392	1399	Ralph Selby	
1399	26 November 1399	Walter Cook	
10 March 1402	c. 1403	Thomas Tuttebury	Thomas Tutbury. Also Dean of Wells 1401-1410.
26 February 1403	bef 1 October 1424	William Milton	
late 1404		Nicholas Ryshton	Failed seizure of office.
1 October 1424	1443	Thomas Beckington	
c. 1443	bef 2 April 1474	Richard Andrews	
2 April 1474	6 November 1495	John Bouchier	
13 February 1496	1505	Robert Sherborne	Also Archdeacon of Taunton; and Dean of St Paul's from 1499.
8 May 1505	1516	Charles Booth	
24 December 1516	bef 14 October 1534	John Taylor	
14 October 1534	bef 17 June 1544	Richard Layton	
17 June 1544	bef 29 April 1554	John Longland	
29 April 1554	1559	Richard Porter	Deprived 1559
1559	bef 2 November 1589	John Longland (again)	
2 November 1589	24 March 1614	Erasmus Webb	
29 March 1614	21 June 1642	Robert Newell	
1660		Joseph Crowther	Ineffective contest.
19 July 1660	25 June 1671	Giles Thorne	
6 July 1671	1 November 1684	John Hillersdon	
4 November 1684	9 August 1722	John Gery	
1 September 1722	1742	Nicholas Clagett	Bishop of St David's from 1732; translated to Exeter.
10 August 1742	4 January 1753	The Hon William Carmichael	Became Bishop of Clonfert.
13 January 1753	4 April 1766	John Taylor	
26 April 1766	1769	John Gordon	Became Archdeacon of Lincoln.
9 October 1769	20 July 1778	Pulter Forester	
2 September 1778	23 June 1825	Luke Heslop	
7 September 1825	18 March 1853	Justly Hill	
On 19 July 1837, the archdeaconry was transferred from the Diocese of Lincoln to the Diocese of Oxford.
25 April 1853	bef 5 June 1875	Edward Bickersteth	afterwards Dean of Lichfield, 1875
June 1875	1880	Arthur Purey-Cust	afterwards Dean of York, 1880
1880	1889	Leslie Randall	afterwards Bishop of Reading, 1889
1895	1910	Cecil Bourke	
1910	1921	Edward Shaw	Also Bishop of Buckingham from 1914; became Assistant Bishop and Archdeacon of Oxford.
1921	1944	Philip Eliot	As Bishop of Buckingham.
1944	1957	Robert Hay	As Bishop of Buckingham.
1957	1960	Gordon Savage	afterwards Bishop of Buckingham, 1960
1960	1970	John Pratt	afterwards Provost of Southwell Minster, 1970
1970	1977	Derek Eastman	
1978	1989	John Bone	afterwards Bishop of Reading, 1989
1989	1998	John Morrison	afterwards Archdeacon of Oxford, 1998
1998	2002	David Goldie	
2002	January 2007	Sheila Watson	afterwards Archdeacon of Canterbury, 2007
6 October 2007	19 January 2016	Karen Gorham	afterwards Bishop of Sherborne
18 July 2016	present	Guy Elsmore	

== Sources ==
- GenUKI – early Archdeacons of Sutton-cum-Buckingham
- Greenway, Diana E. (1977), Fasti Ecclesiae Anglicanae 1066–1300, vol. 3, pp. 39–41
- King, H.P.F. (1962), Fasti Ecclesiae Anglicanae 1300–1541, vol. 1, pp. 15–16
- Horn, Joyce M.; Smith, David M. (1999), Fasti Ecclesiae Anglicanae 1541–1857, vol. 9, pp. 14–15
- Horn, Joyce M. (1996), Fasti Ecclesiae Anglicanae 1541–1857, vol. 8, p. 86
- Le Neve, John; Hardy, Sir Thomas Duffus (1854). Archdeacons of Buckingham . Fasti ecclesiae Anglicanae. Vol. 2. Oxford: Oxford University Press. pp. 67–71 – via Wikisource.
