= Robert Newell (priest) =

English Anglican priest

Robert Newell, D.D. was an English Anglican priest in the 17th century.

Morton was educated at St John's College, Cambridge; and incorporated at Oxford in 1600. He held livings at Wormley, Cheshunt, Islip, Clothall and North Crawley. He was Archdeacon of Buckingham from 1614 until his death in 1642.
