= David Leaning =

David Leaning (18 August 1936 – 28 July 2015) was an eminent Anglican priest.

Leaning was born in Lincolnshire, and educated at Brigg Grammar School and Keble College, Oxford and was ordained in 1961. He was a curate in Gainsborough then held incumbencies in Warsop and Kington before becoming the Archdeacon of Newark. In 1991 he became Provost of Southwell and, when the title changed on 19 March 2000, Dean of Southwell, a post he held until 2006.

During his tenure, Southwell Minster was enhanced by many artistic, cultural and commercial improvements, including the great west window by Patrick Reyntiens, several artworks by Peter Eugene Ball, the Millennium Pilgrim by Rory Young, the Road to Emmaus and Stations of the Cross by Jonathan Clarke, the development of a retreat house at Sacrista Prebend, and a new shop and refectory building in the grounds of the former Grammar School, which was converted into cathedral offices, a gallery and education space.

In retirement he was chaplain to the parish of St. Mary Magdalene, Bailgate, Lincoln, before moving to Chichester in his last years. He is buried in the churchyard of Sempringham Priory, Lincolnshire.

== Notes ==
Church of England titles
Preceded by John Murray Irvine	Provost/ Dean of Southwell; 1991–2006	Succeeded by John Arthur Guille
