= Middleton Stoney =

Village in Oxfordshire, England

Coordinates: 51.908°N 1.225°W

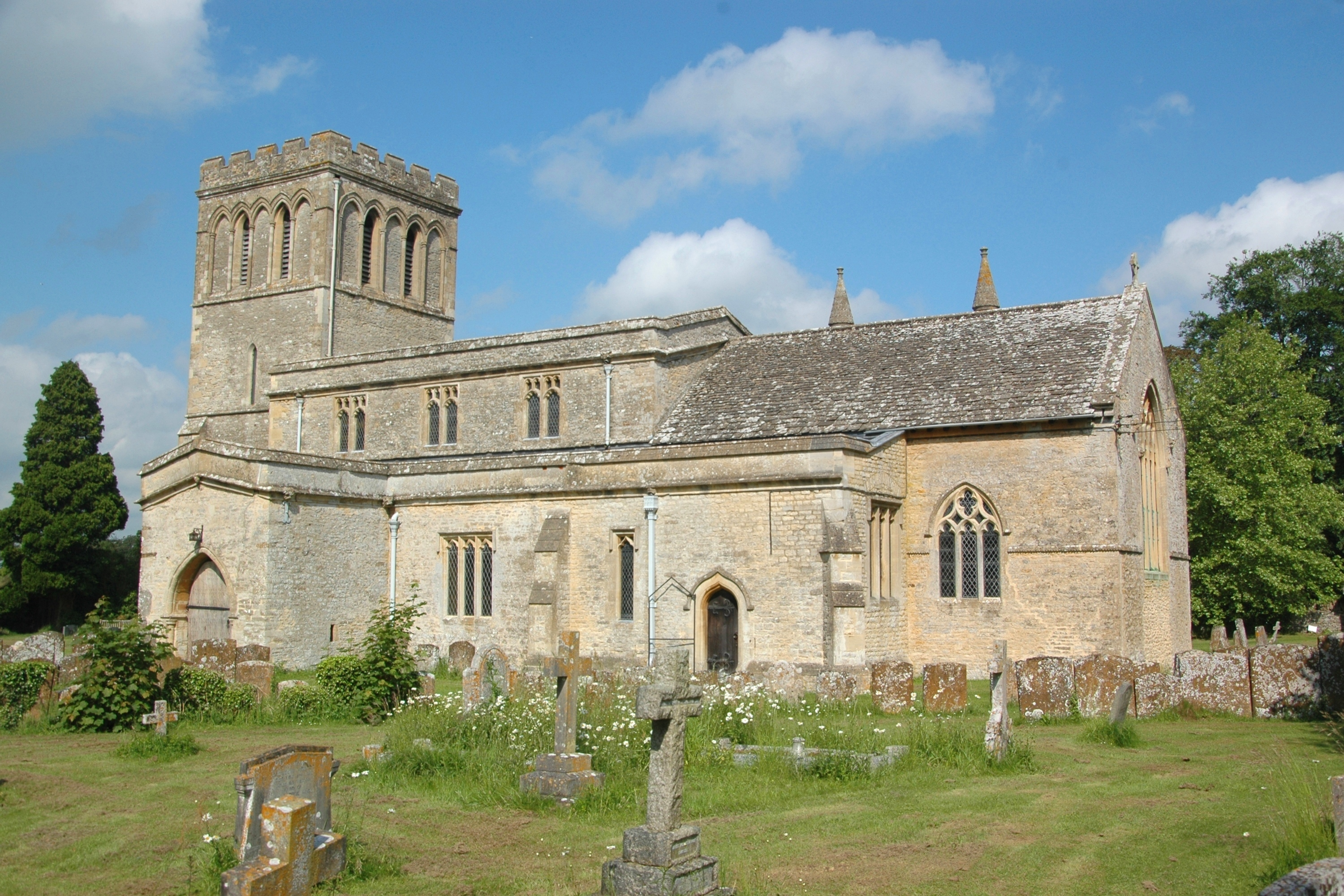
- All Saints' parish church

- Location within Oxfordshire
- Area: 7.50 km^{2} (2.90 sq mi)
- Population: 331 (2011 Census)
  - Density: 44/km^{2} (110/sq mi)
- OS grid reference: SP5323
- Civil parish: Middleton Stoney
- District: Cherwell
- Shire county: Oxfordshire
- Region: South East
- Country: England
- Sovereign state: United Kingdom
- Post town: Bicester
- Postcode district: OX25
- Dialling code: 01869
- Police: Thames Valley
- Fire: Oxfordshire
- Ambulance: South Central
- UK Parliament: Bicester and Woodstock
- Website: Middleton Stoney Village Website

Middleton Stoney is a village and civil parish about 2 1/2 miles (4 km) west of Bicester, Oxfordshire, England. The 2011 Census recorded the parish's population as 331.

The parish measures about 2 miles (3 km) north–south and about 1 1/2 miles (2.4 km) east–west, and in 1959 its area was 1,853 acres (750 ha). Its eastern boundary is Gagle Brook, a tributary of the River Ray, and its western boundary is Aves ditch. It is bounded to the north and south by field boundaries.

== Archaeology ==
The remains of a Roman building from the second century AD, possibly a barn, have been found southeast of the former castle.

Aves ditch is pre-Saxon and may have been dug as a boundary ditch.

The castle was excavated between 1970 and 1982. Until the excavations it had been generally assumed the castle was of the motte-and-bailey type, but the excavations demonstrated that was not the case.

== Toponym ==
"Middleton" is a common toponym derived from Old English. It means the middle tūn (enclosure or township) of a group. The Domesday Book of 1086 records this particular Middleton as Middeltone. Episcopal registers record it as Mudelingtona in 1209–19 and Middellington in 1251. A document from 1242 included in the Book of Fees records it as Mudelinton.

The earliest known record of the affix "Stoney" is from 1552. It may refer to stone pits in the parish, from which Jurassic Cornbrash limestone was quarried to build dry stone walls. It differentiates the village and parish from Middleton Cheney in Northamptonshire, about 12 miles (19 km) to the north.

== Manor and castle ==
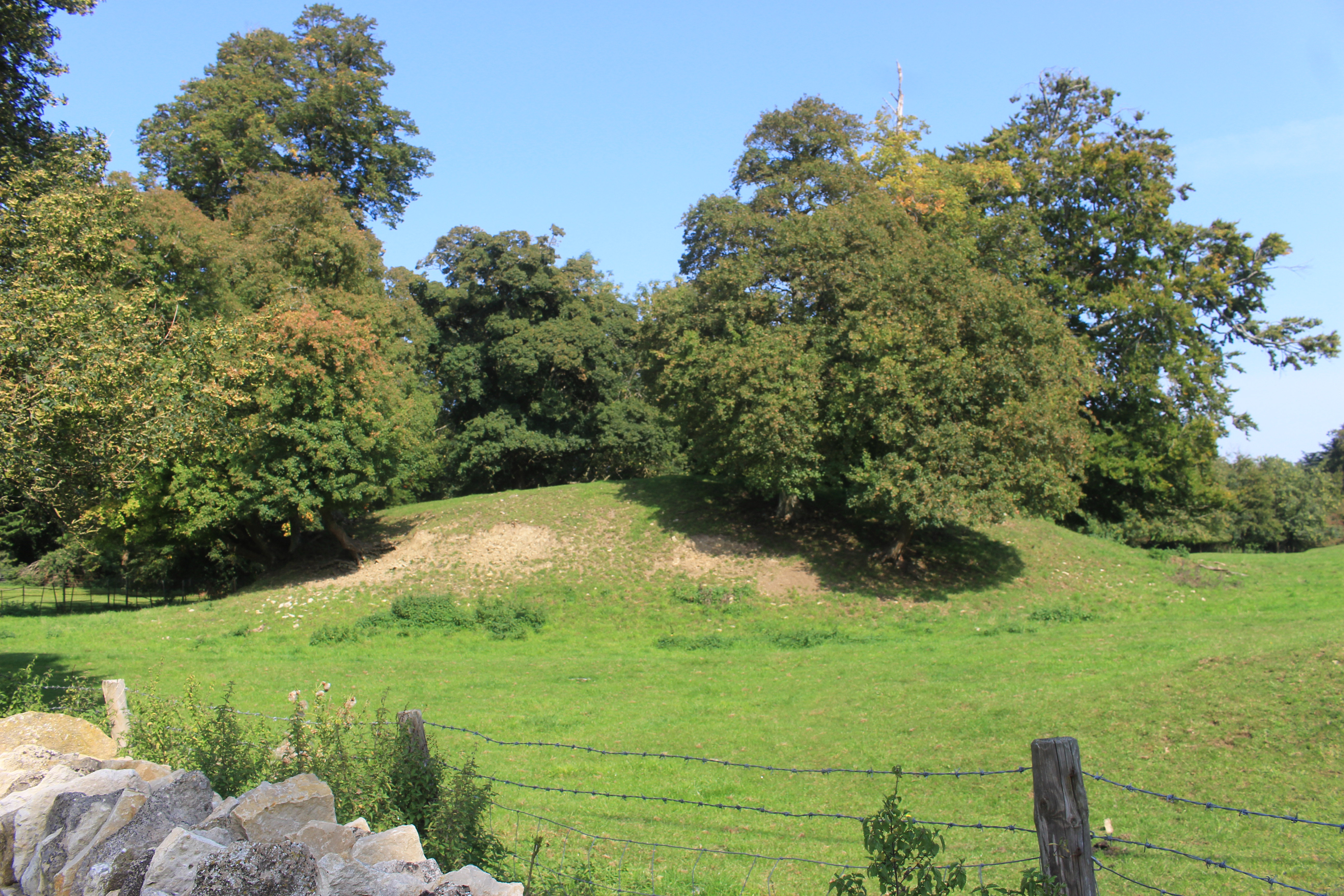
The remains of Middleton Stoney Castle near the church

Middleton Stoney existed by the time of King Edward the Confessor, when one Turi held the manor. It was valued at 10 hides.

Middleton Stoney Castle was first recorded in 1215. Its remains are east of All Saints' parish church and are a Scheduled Ancient Monument.

Middleton Park is a neo-Georgian country house designed by Edwin Lutyens and his son Robert and built in 1938 for the 9th Earl of Jersey. It is a Grade I listed building.

== Parish church ==
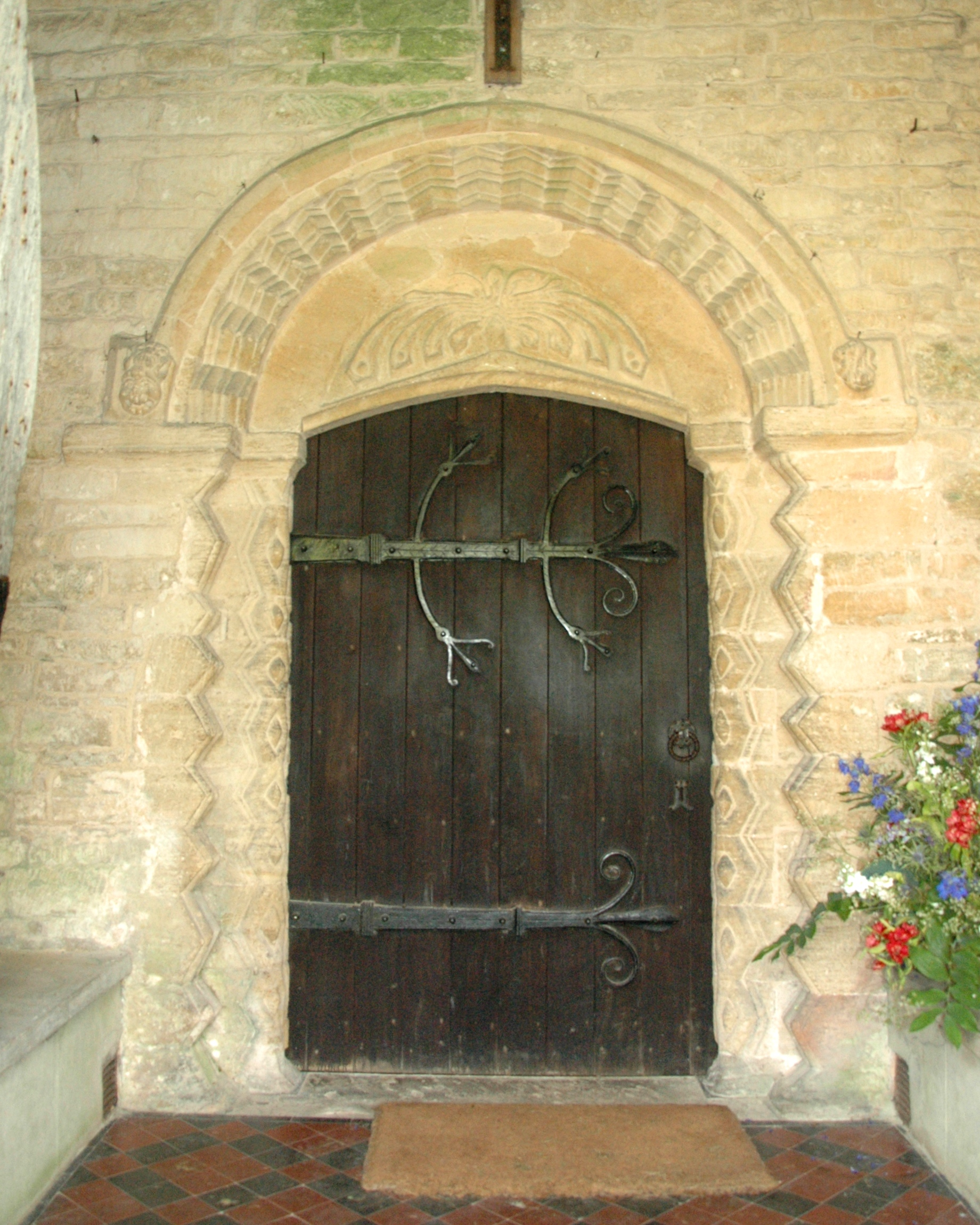
All Saints' parish church: mid-12th century Norman south doorway

The earliest parts of the Church of England parish church of All Saints are Norman, built in the middle of the 12th century. In about 1190 the chancel arch was inserted and the north aisle and three-bay arcade were added in a transitional style between Norman and Early English Gothic. In the 14th century the south aisle and its two-bay arcade were built. The nave has a clerestory that was added in the 15th century.

In 1805 a transeptal mausoleum was added to the north side of the chancel for the Child-Villiers family. In 1858 the church was restored under the direction of the architect Samuel Sanders Teulon, under whom the west tower was rebuilt and the Jersey mausoleum was Normanised.

In 1860 a 14th-century Gothic baptismal font was presented to the church. On its base a 17th-century inscription says This fonte came/from the Kings/chapel in Islipp... and claims that Edward the Confessor was baptised in it. If true, it would be a Saxon font that was re-cut and Gothicised in the 14th century. It may have been salvaged from the Saxon chapel of the Royal House of Wessex at Islip, which was damaged in the English Civil War in 1645 and demolished in the 1780s.

In 1868 the church was refitted to designs by the Oxford Diocesan architect GE Street, who added a vestry, reredos, choir stalls and new pulpit. The church is a Grade II* listed building.

The west tower has a ring of six bells, all cast in 1717 by Henry III Bagley of Chacombe. Mears and Stainbank of the Whitechapel Bell Foundry recast the tenor and treble bells in 1883 and the fifth bell in 1885.

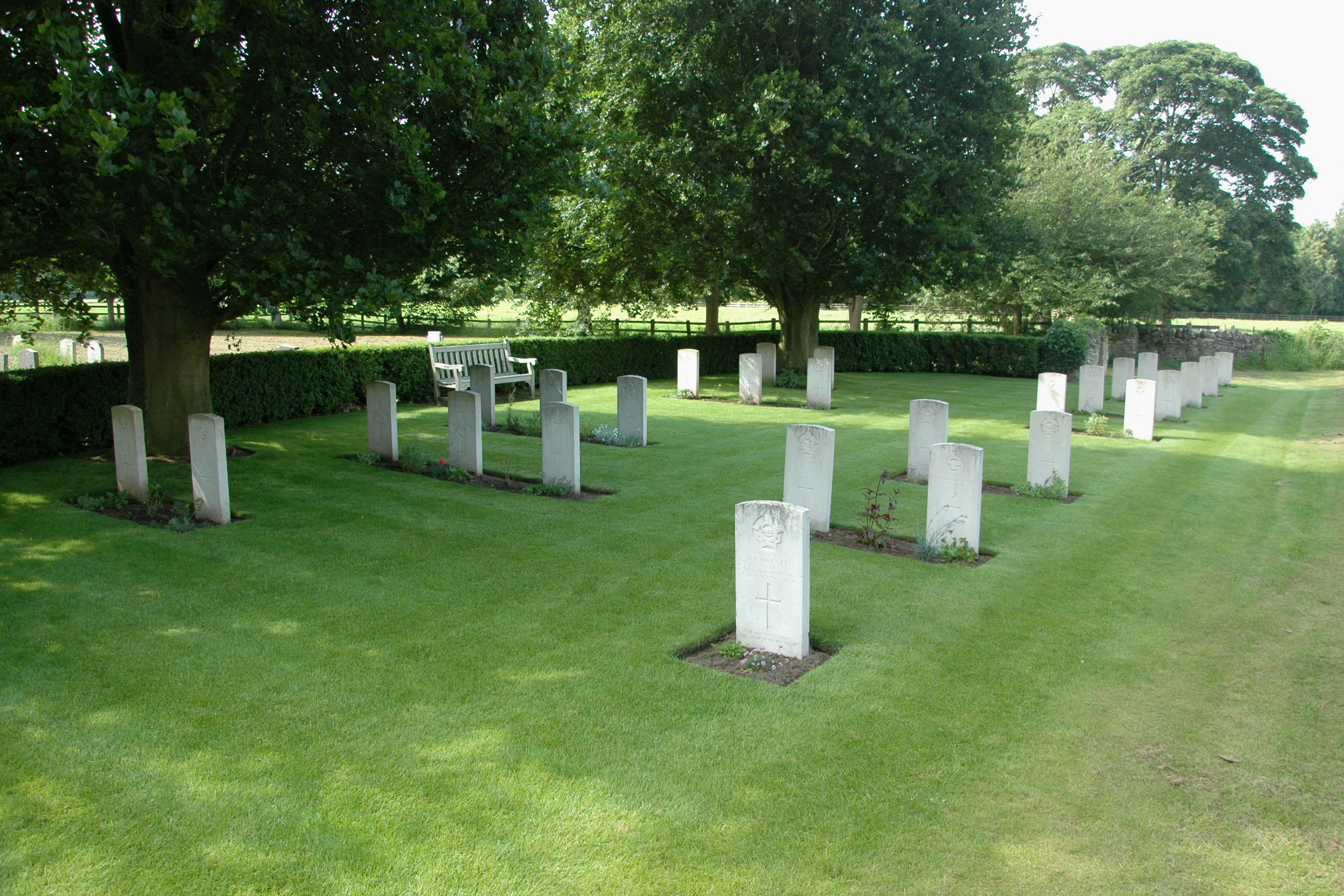
CWGC section in All Saints' parish churchyard

The parish churchyard has a Commonwealth War Graves Commission section with 27 Second World War burials. All but one are airmen from RAF Upper Heyford in the next parish, including 10 from the Royal Canadian Air Force and two from the Royal New Zealand Air Force. The exception is a Royal Navy officer, Lieut Conroy Ancil, who served on the escort carrier HMS Stalker and died in 1943.

All Saints' is now part of the Akeman Church of England Benefice, which includes the parishes of Bletchingdon, Chesterton, Hampton Gay, Kirtlington, Wendlebury and Weston-on-the-Green.

== Economic and social history ==
The parish's common lands were inclosed at the end of the 17th century. In 1824–25 George Child Villiers, 5th Earl of Jersey had the original village and manor house demolished to make way for him to expand Middleton Park eastwards. The castle mound and All Saints' church remain isolated within the extended park. His wife Sarah Villiers, Countess of Jersey directed the building of new cottages on the edge of the park, each with a rustic porch and a flower garden. These form the nucleus of the current village.

The current village is at the crossroads of two main roads. The north–south road used to be the main road between Oxford and Brackley. In the 1920s it was classified as the A43. In the 1990s the M40 motorway was completed and the stretch of the A43 through Middleton Stoney was reclassified B430. The east–west road is the main road between Bicester and Enstone. In 1797 an Act of Parliament made this road into a turnpike. It was disturnpiked in the 19th century and in the 20th it was classified B4030.

== Amenities ==
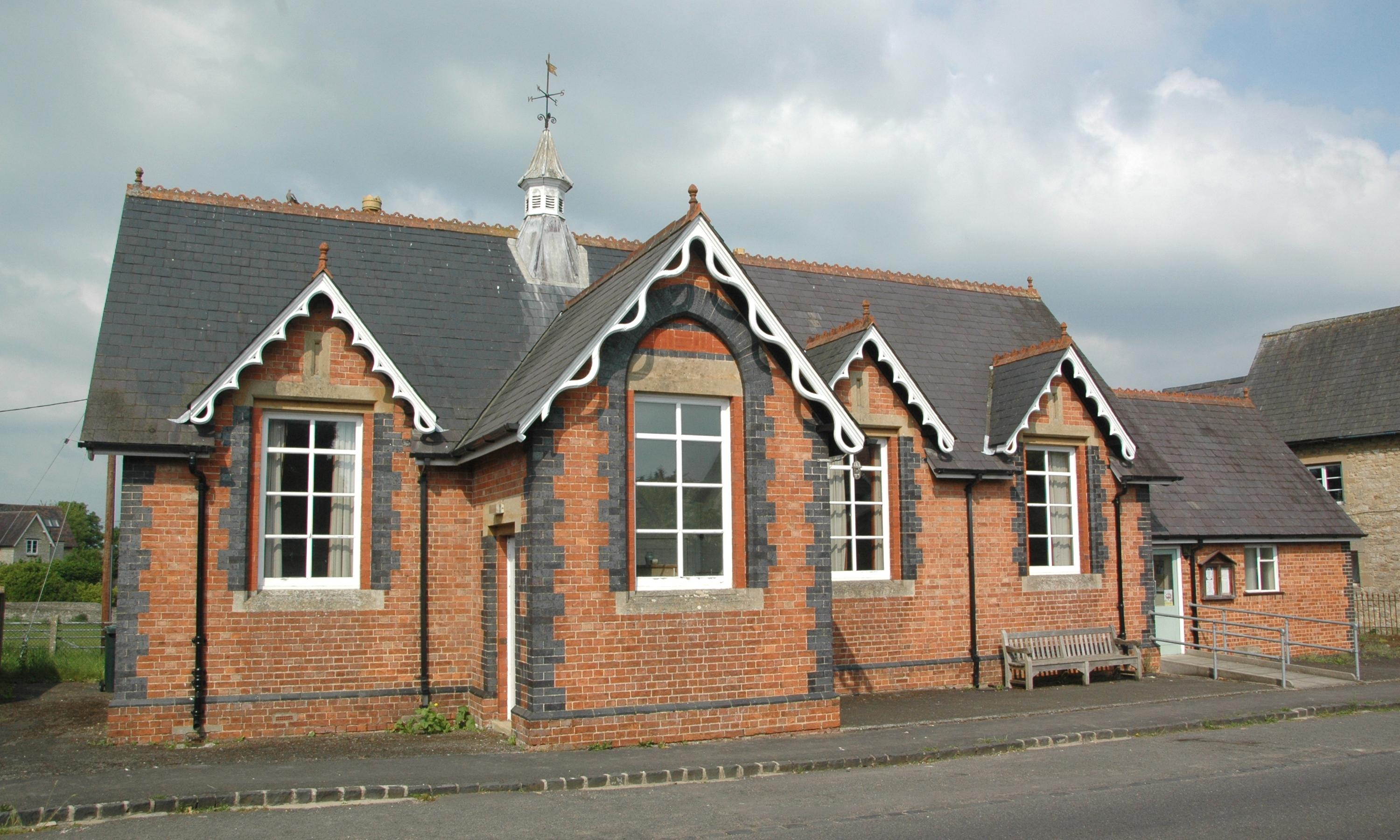
The former parish school, now the village hall

The village has a pub that used to be called the Eagle and Child. It is now the Jersey Arms, a hotel owned by Shepherd Cox Hotels and operated as a Best Western SureStay Hotel.

Middleton Stoney used to have a parish school. The building is now the village hall.

=== Public transport ===
Red Rose Travel bus route 25 serves Middleton Stoney, linking the village with Bicester in one direction, and with Upper Heyford and Lower Heyford in the other. Buses run from Mondays to Saturdays, mostly at hourly intervals. There is no late evening service, and no service on Sundays or bank holidays.

== Sources and further reading ==
- Blomfield, James Charles (1888). History of Middleton and Somerton. London.
- Ekwall, Eilert (1960) [1936]. Concise Oxford Dictionary of English Place-Names (4th ed.). Oxford: Oxford University Press. Middleton. ISBN 0198691033.
- Lobel, Mary D, ed. (1959). "Middleton Stoney". A History of the County of Oxford. Victoria County History. Vol. 6: Ploughley Hundred. London: Oxford University Press for the Institute of Historical Research. pp. 243–251.
- Rahtz, Sebastian; Rowley, Trevor, eds. (1984). Middleton Stoney, Excavation and Survey in a North Oxfordshire Parish 1970–1982. Oxford: Oxford University Department for External Studies. ISBN 0-903736-16-0.
- Rowley, Trevor (1978). Villages in the Landscape. Archaeology in the Field Series. London: J.M. Dent & Sons Ltd. p. 137. ISBN 0-460-04166-5.
- Sherwood, Jennifer; Pevsner, Nikolaus (1974). Oxfordshire. The Buildings of England. Harmondsworth: Penguin Books. pp. 701–704. ISBN 0-14-071045-0.
