= Hugh Heywood =

Hugh Christopher Lemprière Heywood (5 November 1896 – 8 May 1987) was an Anglican priest and author in the mid 20th century.

Heywood was born on 5 November 1896 to Lt.-Col. Charles Christopher Heywood and Mildred Ella (née Lemprière). He was educated at Haileybury and Trinity College, Cambridge. He was a descendant of the banker Sir Benjamin Heywood, 1st Baronet.

After World War I service with the Manchester Regiment, Heywood transferred to the British Indian Army in 1917 and was attached to the 74th Punjabis. He served as a staff captain from 1919 until 1922. During his service, he was mentioned in dispatches and wounded. He retired in January 1923. He then returned to England, studied at Cambridge University and was ordained at Ely in 1926. He held curacies at St Andrew the Great in Cambridge and Holy Cross, Greenford, after which he was a Fellow, Tutor and Dean at Gonville and Caius College, Cambridge until 1945. From then until 1969 he was Provost of Southwell Minster. He spent the remaining years of his life as vicar of Upton, Nottinghamshire.

He died on 8 May 1987. In 1920 he had married Margaret Marion Vizard. They had two children.

== Notes ==
- Beeson, Trevor. Priests and Prelates: The Daily Telegraph Clerical Obituaries - The very Reverend Hugh Heywood. Google Books

Church of England titles
Preceded by William Conybeare	Provost of Southwell; 1945–1969	Succeeded by John Pratt
