= Murray Irvine =

John Murray Irvine (19 August 1924 – 14 September 2005) was an Anglican priest.

Irvine was educated at Charterhouse School and Magdalene College, Cambridge. He was ordained in 1949 and was initially a curate at All Saints Church, Poplar and then chaplain of Sidney Sussex College, Cambridge. From 1960 to 1965 he was Secretary of the Central Advisory Council for Training for the Ministry. After this he was Chancellor and Librarian of Hereford Cathedral and Director of Ordination Training for the Diocese of Hereford. He was Provost of Southwell from 1978 to 1991. His final post was as priest in charge of Holy Trinity, Rolleston.

Church of England titles
Preceded by John Pratt	Provost of Southwell; 1978–1991	Succeeded by David Leaning
