= Aves ditch =

Coordinates: 51.904°N 1.261°W

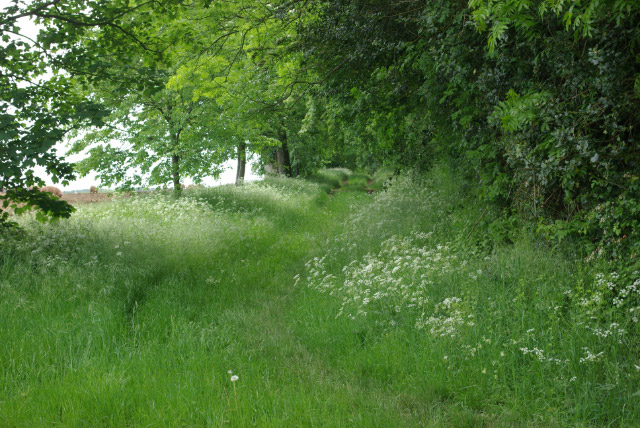

Aves Ditch (also known as Ash Bank, or Wattle Bank) is an Iron Age ditch and bank structure running about 3 miles (4.8 km) on a northeast to southwest alignment in the Cherwell District of Oxfordshire.

It was once believed to have been a Roman road but excavation has shown it to be a boundary dyke of Iron Age date that was reused in the Anglo-Saxon period. A skull found in the ditch was dated to the Anglo-Saxon period. It now forms the boundary between the civil parishes of Lower Heyford and Middleton Stoney.

Both Sauer and Lambrick have suggested that the Aves Ditch along with the North Oxfordshire Grim’s Ditch and the South Oxfordshire Grim’s Ditch may have formed the boundary between the Iron Age tribes of the Dobunni and the Catuvellauni.
