= John Pratt (Provost of Southwell) =

John Francis Isaac Pratt (30 June 1913 – 3 March 1992) was an Anglican priest.

He was born in Bradford-on-Avon, Wiltshire, and educated at Keble College, Oxford. He was ordained in 1937. He held incumbencies in Rastrick, Wendover and Reading before becoming Archdeacon of Buckingham. In 1970, he became Provost of Southwell Minster.

Church of England titles
Preceded by Hugh Christopher Lempriere Heywood	Provost of Southwell; 1970–1978	Succeeded by John Murray Irvine
