= Ardley =

Ardley is an English toponym and may refer to:

== Places ==
- Ardley Cove, South Shetland Islands, Antarctica
- Ardley Island, South Shetland Islands, Antarctica
- Ardley, Alberta, Canada
- Ardley, Oxfordshire, UK
  - Ardley Castle
  - Ardley railway station
- Ardley End, Essex, UK

== Other uses ==
- Ardley United F.C., British football club

== See also ==
- Ardley (surname)
