= Souldern =

Village in Oxfordshire, England

Coordinates: 51.980°N 1.241°W

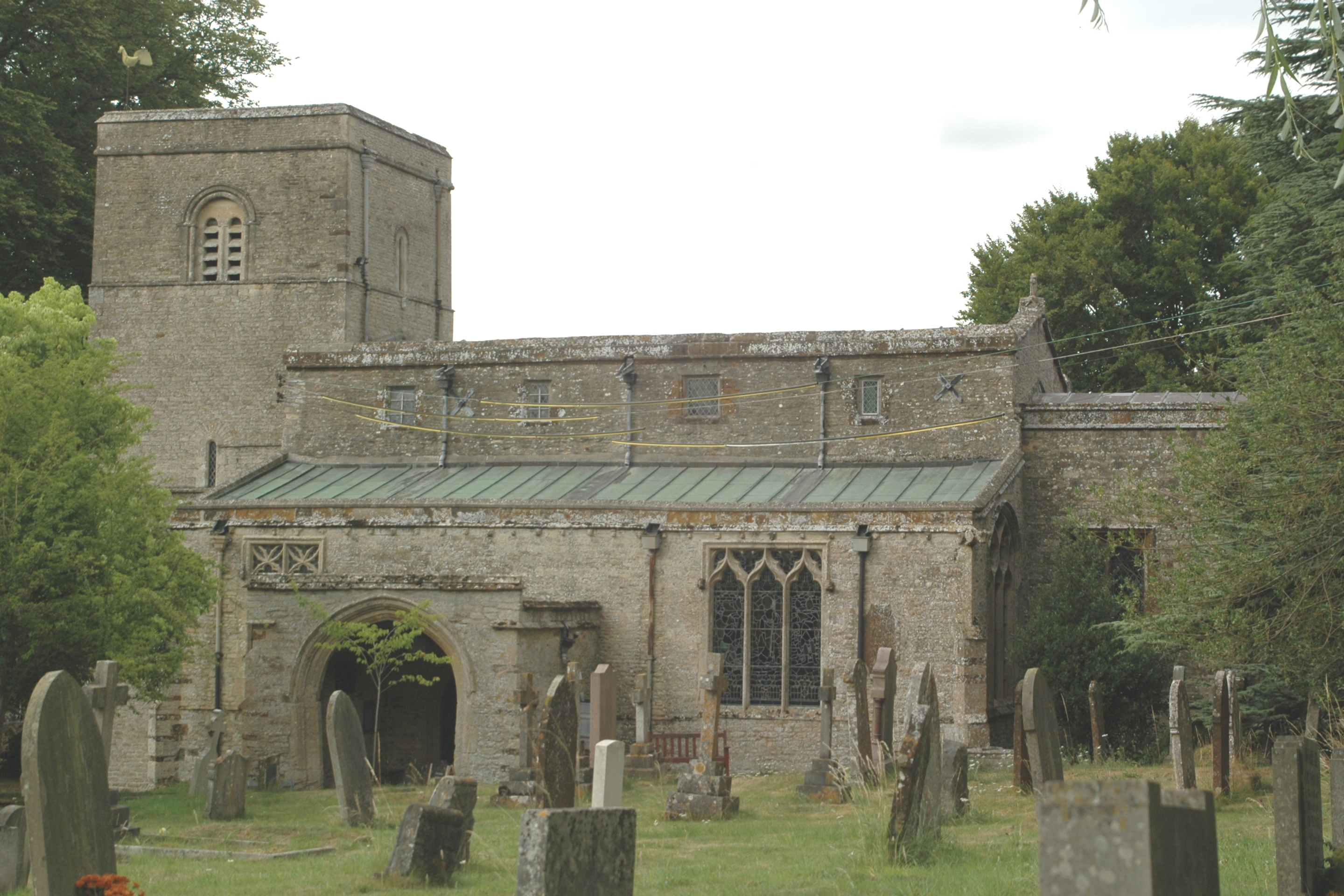
- Parish church of the Annunciation

- Location within Oxfordshire
- Area: 8.11 km^{2} (3.13 sq mi)
- Population: 370 (2011 Census)
  - Density: 46/km^{2} (120/sq mi)
- OS grid reference: SP5231
- Civil parish: Souldern
- District: Cherwell
- Shire county: Oxfordshire
- Region: South East
- Country: England
- Sovereign state: United Kingdom
- Post town: Bicester
- Postcode district: OX27
- Dialling code: 01869
- Police: Thames Valley
- Fire: Oxfordshire
- Ambulance: South Central
- UK Parliament: Banbury
- Website: Souldern Village

Souldern is a village and civil parish in Oxfordshire about 7 miles (11 km) northwest of Bicester and a similar distance southeast of Banbury. The parish is bounded to the west by the River Cherwell and to the east by field boundaries. Its northern boundary is Ockley Brook, a tributary of the Cherwell that forms the county boundary with Northamptonshire. The parish's southern boundaries are the main road between Bicester and Adderbury and the minor road between Souldern and Somerton. The 2011 Census recorded the parish's population as 370.

Souldern's toponym is derived from the Old English Sulh-þorn meaning "Thorn-bush in a gully".

== Manor ==
The Domesday Book of 1086 does not mention Souldern. Early in the 12th century Jordan de Say, a Norman nobleman who owned the manor of Kirtlington, seems also to have owned Souldern. He married his daughter Eustache or Eustachia to Hugh FitzOsbern (died 1140), by whom the manor became part of the honour of Richard's Castle in Herefordshire. Hugh and Eustache's sons took their mother's surname de Say, and overlordship of the Honour of Richard's Castle, including Souldern, remained with the family until about 1196, when their grandson Hugh de Say died leaving Richard's Castle to his daughter Margaret. She married three times and the castle eventually passed to the heirs of her second husband Robert Mortimer. The Mortimers kept the castle until Hugh Mortimer died in 1304, leaving it to his daughter Joan. Joan married twice and with her second husband Richard Talbot had a son, John, who was recorded as overlord of Souldern in 1346.

By 1196 Hugh de Say, grandson of Hugh FitzOsbern, had transferred lordship of the manor of Souldern to his brother-in-law Thomas de Arderne. By 1279 the Ardernes were mesne lords, collecting rent from the de Lewknor family. By 1307 the de Lewknors had conveyed Souldern to the Abberbury family of Donnington, Berkshire. Sir Richard Abberbury, knight of the shire for Oxfordshire in 1373 and 1387, granted lands at Souldern to both Donnington Hospital and a house of Crutched Friars at Donnington. Sir Richard's nephew, another Richard Abberbury, inherited the remainder. The younger Richard seized the Crutched Friars' land at Souldern and granted it to William de la Pole, 1st Duke of Suffolk in 1448. The remainder of Richard's land at Souldern passed to his nephew Sir Richard Arches (d.1417), MP for Buckinghamshire in 1402, of Eythrope, Cranwell (both in the parish of Waddesdon) and Little Kimble, Buckinghamshire. Souldern was inherited by his daughter Joan Arches and her husband Sir John Dynham. When their son, John Dynham, 1st Baron Dynham, died in 1501, Souldern manor was divided into four parts which remained in separate hands until the 1590s.

One part passed to Thomas Arundell of Wardour Castle, Cornwall, whose mother was a Dynham, and remained in the Arundell family until Sir John Arundell (died 1590) sold it. By that year John Stutsbury, Robert Weedon and his son John Weedon had bought two parts of the manor. Robert married Stutsbury's daughter and by the time he died in 1598 Robert had acquired a third part. In 1604 John Weedon acquired the fourth and final part of Souldern by quitclaim, thus reuniting the manor after just over a century of division.

The Stutsbury and Weedon families were recusants (see below) and during the English Civil War the Parliamentarians confiscated the Weedons' estates. After the English Restoration the Crown restored the estates, which then stayed in the family until John Weedon died in 1710. John left his manor to Samuel Cox, the infant grandson of Richard Kilby of Souldern. The Cox family lived in Farningham, Kent and were largely absentee landlords. In the 1860s Lieutenant-Colonel Richard Snead Cox of Broxwood, Herefordshire was listed as lord of the manor of Souldern, but thereafter the lordship was allowed to lapse.

In 1868,the owner, John Thomas Dolman died and the manor was then lived in by his daughter Mary and her husband Bryan John Stapleton. Mary Stapleton was a keen local historian and the whole family were Catholics. Mary was a friend of William Bernard Ullathorne, the Bishop of Birmingham, and she was generous in the local village. Before 1880 they had decided that the house was not healthy enough, and they had a reduced income, so they moved to another listed building Grove House in Kidlington.

== Churches ==
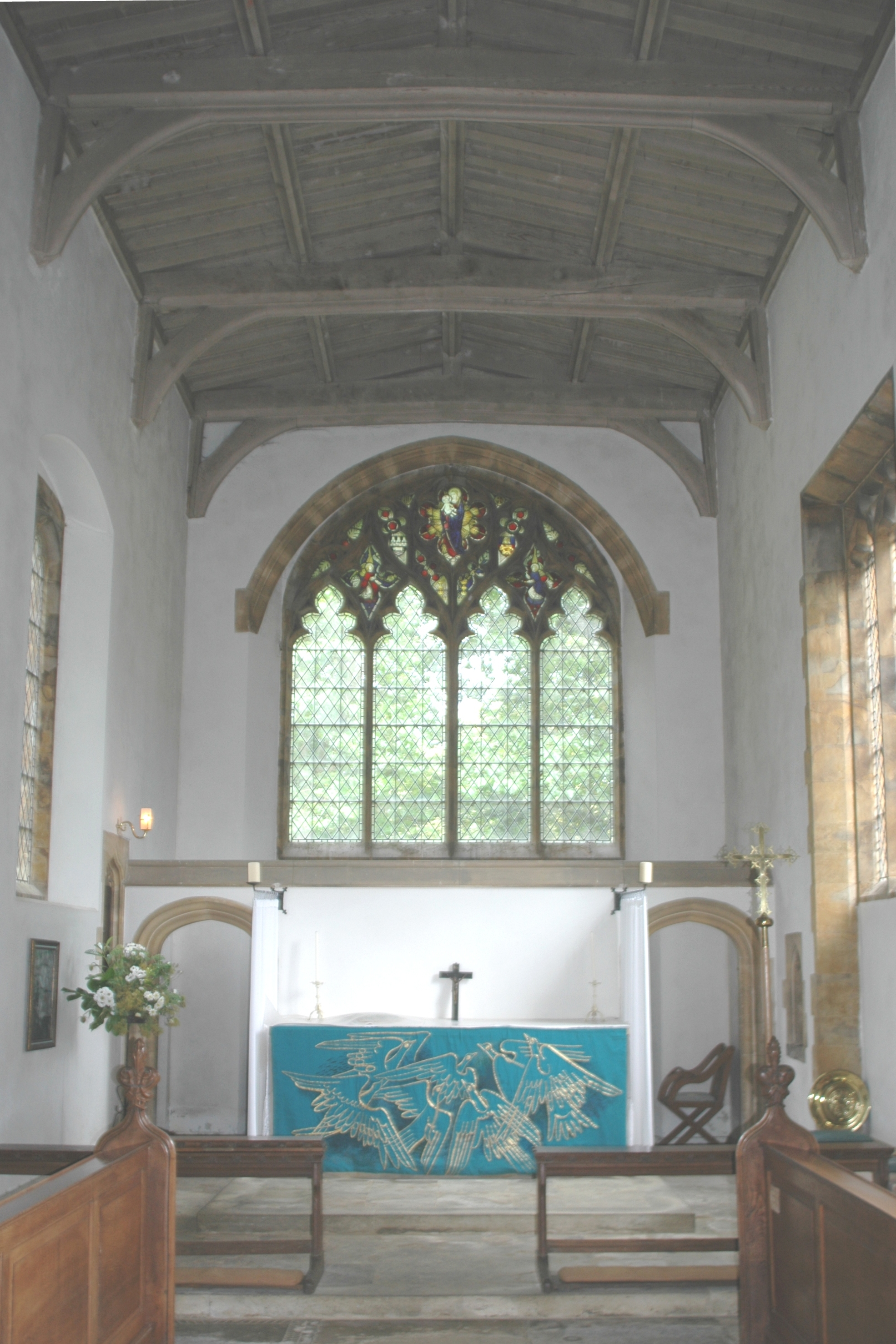
Interior of the Gothic Revival chancel added in 1897 by Ninian Comper

=== Church of England ===
The oldest parts of the Church of England parish church of the Annunciation to the Blessed Virgin Mary are 12th century. The church was enlarged and altered at various times between about 1200 and 1500. The medieval chancel fell into disrepair in the 18th century and was demolished after 1775. In 1896–97 the Gothic Revival architect Ninian Comper rebuilt the chancel and in 1906 G.F. Bodley dismantled and rebuilt the Norman tower and tower arch.

From 1161 until the Dissolution of the Monasteries in 1539 the Benedictine Eynsham Abbey owned the advowson of the parish. After 1623 John Williams, Bishop of Lincoln granted it to St John's College, Cambridge, which still owned the advowson in 1955.

The tower has a ring of six bells, including three cast by Henry I Bagley of Chacombe, Northamptonshire in the 1630s.

The ecclesiastical parish is a member of the Cherwell Valley Benefice along with the parishes of Ardley, Fritwell, Lower Heyford, Somerton and Upper Heyford.

The parish had a rectory that was built before 1638 and had fishponds well-stocked with carp by 1723. The poet William Wordsworth stayed there in 1820. Afterwards he wrote the sonnet A Parsonage in Oxfordshire, and in another sonnet called the house "this humble and beautiful parsonage". In 1890 this historic house was demolished and replaced with a new one designed by the Gothic Revival architect E.G. Bruton.

=== Roman Catholic ===
John Stutsbury was recorded as a recusant in Souldern in 1577 and 1592. John Weedon and his wife were fined for recusancy in 1603 and the Weedons were said to have mortgaged land to a house of Benedictine nuns in Dunkirk. The Kilby family were recusants and were said to have mortgaged land to the Benedictine Douai Abbey, which then was at Douai in France. The Cox family were also Roman Catholics. The number of recusants recorded in Souldern was nine in 1643, 21 in 1676, 19 in 1690 and 25 in 1703. for the remainder of the 18th century the number fluctuated between 10 and 14.

The manor-house had a Roman Catholic chapel hidden in the attic. There seems to have been no resident priest, so Roman Catholics would have relied on visiting clergy to celebrate Mass. In 1778 Parliament passed the Papists Act (England's first Roman Catholic Relief Act) and in 1781 Souldern's hidden chapel ceased to be used. The attic chapel was used again from 1852 until 1869 or 1870 when it was succeeded by Saint Joseph's chapel, which the Gothic Revival architect Charles Hansom created by adding a brick extension to convert the manor house's stone-built coach house. These developments helped to revive Souldern's Roman Catholic community which by the end of the 19th century comprised about nine families.

=== Wesleyan ===
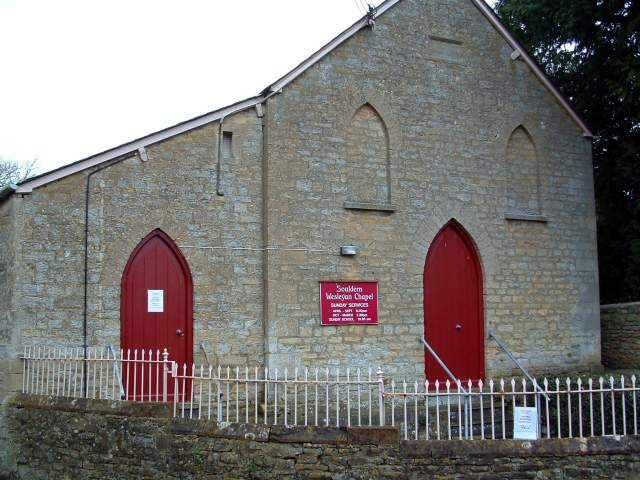
Souldern Wesleyan Reform chapel

In 1851 a stone-built Methodist Reform chapel was completed in Souldern. In 1857 most Methodist Reform congregations merged with the Wesleyan Association, but Souldern chapel was one of a minority that rejected the merger and together founded the Wesleyan Reform Union instead.

== Economic and social history ==
Souldern Mill is on Ockley Brook about 1/2 mile (800 m) west of the village. The oldest known record of it is from 1279. By the latter part of the 17th century there were two mills, but the second mill did not survive. The mill was independent of Souldern Manor, and being on the county and parish boundary with Aynho it may have served both villages. It may be the mill that was referred to as "Aynho Mill" in 1797. A watermill between the two villages was still working in 1920.

The parish's open field system of farming was ended at a relatively early date. Early in the 17th century the lord of the manor wished to terminate all common land rights but the Souldern's freeholders opposed him and the case went to court. The judge advised the parties to accept the arbitration of the Recorder of Banbury, Sir Thomas Chamberlayne, who ruled that the parish be "measured, divided and inclosed". The parish was duly surveyed and in 1613 the division and awarding of land was ratified by the Court of Chancery.

Before enclosure much of the parish was arable, but afterwards farmers converted the major part of their land to pasture and meadow, apparently to minimise the amount of tithes that they had to pay. Most of the conversion was by sowing sainfoin, which by 1700 had doubled the value of the land. In 1842 two-thirds of the parish's farmland was pasture and only one-third was arable. The good pasture supported the development of cheese-making in the parish. Early in the 20th century up to 15 cheese-makers were employed at the manor house.

Souldern's economy was unusually diverse for a village. In the 17th century it included two tailors, a weaver and a mercer. At a later date there were three tailors and a milliner. At one time Souldern had three lace-making schools and in 1851 there were more than 30 lace-makers in the parish, but the trade declined towards the end of the 19th century.

Numerous houses in Souldern are built of local pale Jurassic limestone and date from the Great Rebuilding of England between the mid-16th and mid-17th centuries, some with stone-mullioned windows on the lower floor and attic dormers upstairs. The Court and The Hollies are two L-shaped houses from about 1600. The Barn and Greystones are rectangular in plan and probably early 17th century in age. The Hermitage was built in the 16th century, extended in the 18th century, and its 17th-century staircase is said to have come from The Court.

There have been two different properties called "Souldern House". The present one is a rectangular early-17th-century house formerly called "Souldern Lodge". In its garden is a gazebo dated 1706. The previous "Souldern House" is now called the Manor House. Until the 1950s it had the date 1665 on a fireplace in one of its rooms. The house was altered in 1850, and again in 1955–56 for Vivian Smith, 1st Baron Bicester.

In 1641 during the English Civil War, Royalists ordered the parish to send carts and provisions to King Charles I at Oxford. In 1643 six regiments of Parliamentarian troops from London were billeted in the parish.

=== Schools ===
Souldern's first purpose-built village school was paid for by William and James Minn and opened in 1816. In 1820 Sarah Westcar died, leaving £200 to be invested for the school to pay the salary of a National School master. The School was affiliated to the National Society for Promoting Religious Education by 1847.

The school outgrew its premises, and in 1851 James Minn died leaving land for a new school building and cottages for two teachers. These were completed in 1856. After 1871 the school was enlarged again and a new house added for schoolmaster. In 1930 it was reorganised as a junior school, with senior pupils being sent to Fritwell. By 1951 it was a voluntary controlled school and by 1954 the number of pupils had declined to 17. It has since closed.

St Joseph's Roman Catholic school was built in 1879. It had one teacher, and the number of pupils declined from 18 in 1887 to eight in 1903. It was closed in 1904.

=== Transport history ===
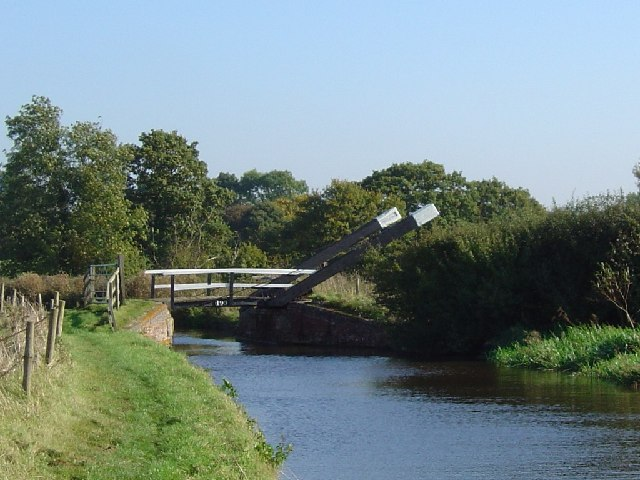
Chisnell Bridge, a drawbridge across the Oxford Canal southwest of Souldern

The main road between Bicester and Banbury was made into a turnpike by an Act of Parliament passed in 1791. The section through Souldern parish between Bicester and Aynho ceased to be a turnpike in 1877. When Britain's principal roads were classified early in the 1920s, the stretch of the former turnpike between Bicester and Twyford, Oxfordshire was made part of the A41. In 1990 the section of the M40 motorway between Wheatley, Oxfordshire and Hockley Heath was built and the Bicester – Twyford stretch of the A41 was reclassified as part of the B4100. The M40 runs through the southwestern part of Souldern parish, passing within 1,200 yards (1 km) of the village.

The Oxford Canal was built through the western part of the parish in 1787. Souldern Wharf is about 1 1/2 miles (2.4 km) west of the village.

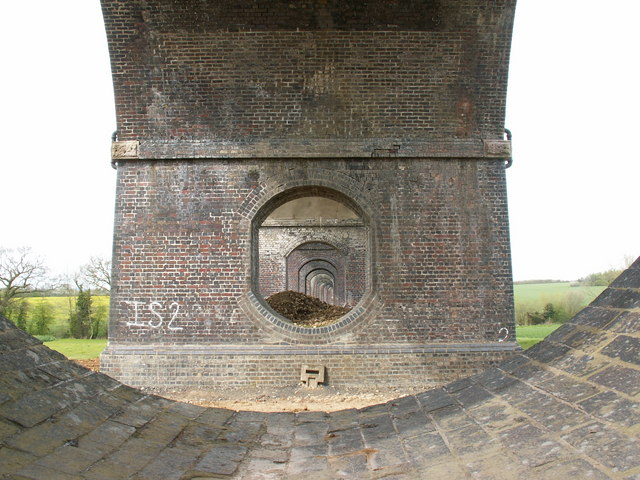
Brickwork under Souldern Viaduct, built for the GWR in 1910

Building of the Oxford and Rugby Railway (ORR) between Oxford and Banbury began in 1845. By the time the line opened in 1850 the Great Western Railway (GWR) had taken it over. In Souldern parish the ORR runs parallel with and just east of the canal. The railway is now part of the Cherwell Valley Line.

In 1910 the GWR completed a new main line linking Ashendon Junction and Aynho Junction to shorten the high-speed route between its termini at London Paddington and Birmingham Snow Hill. It passes through Souldern parish just east of the ORR, crossing two streams on viaducts. The cut-off line leaves the Cherwell valley via the 1,155 yards (1,056 m) long Ardley Tunnel, the north portal of which is in the parish. The railway is now part of the Chiltern Main Line.

== Amenities ==
In 1735 Souldern had one licensed public house. By 1784 there were two: the Bull's Head and The Fox, and by the 1850s these had been joined by The Crown. By 1939 the only survivor was The Fox, which now trades as the Fox Inn.

Souldern Football Club plays in the Banbury District and Lord Jersey FA. In 1925 Souldern FC beat Kirtlington FC 1–0 to win the Jersey Cup. The Souldern team included four members of one local family, the Westburys, and it was Bob Westbury who scored the only goal of the match. In 1982 Souldern FC reached the final again but lost 3–1 to Charlton FC.

== Notable people ==
Another member of Souldern's winning 1925 football team was the future Labour politician F.J. Wise (1887–1968). Wise had entered politics by 1931 and was elected MP for King's Lynn in 1945. Wise lost his seat in the 1951 General Election. He was then ennobled in the 1951 Resignation Honours as 1st Baron Wise of King's Lynn.

== Sources ==
- Compton, Hugh J (1976). The Oxford Canal. Newton Abbot: David & Charles. p. 37. ISBN 0-7153-7238-6.
- Hitchman, Robert A (1984). A Third Journey from the Turnpike. Souldern: Robert A Hitchman. p. 31.
- Lobel, Mary D, ed. (1959). A History of the County of Oxford. Victoria County History. Vol. 6: Ploughley Hundred. London: Oxford University Press for the Institute of Historical Research. pp. 301–312.
- Sherwood, Jennifer; Pevsner, Nikolaus (1974). Oxfordshire. The Buildings of England. Harmondsworth: Penguin Books. pp. 768–769. ISBN 0-14-071045-0.
