= Ardley (surname) =

Ardley is an English surname derived from a toponym and may refer to:

- George Ardley (1897–1927), English footballer
- Neal Ardley (born 1972), British footballer
- Neil Ardley (1937–2004), British musician and writer

== See also ==
- Ardley (disambiguation)
