= Church of the Annunciation to the Blessed Virgin Mary, Souldern =

Church in Oxfordshire, England

Church of the Annunciation to the Blessed Virgin Mary
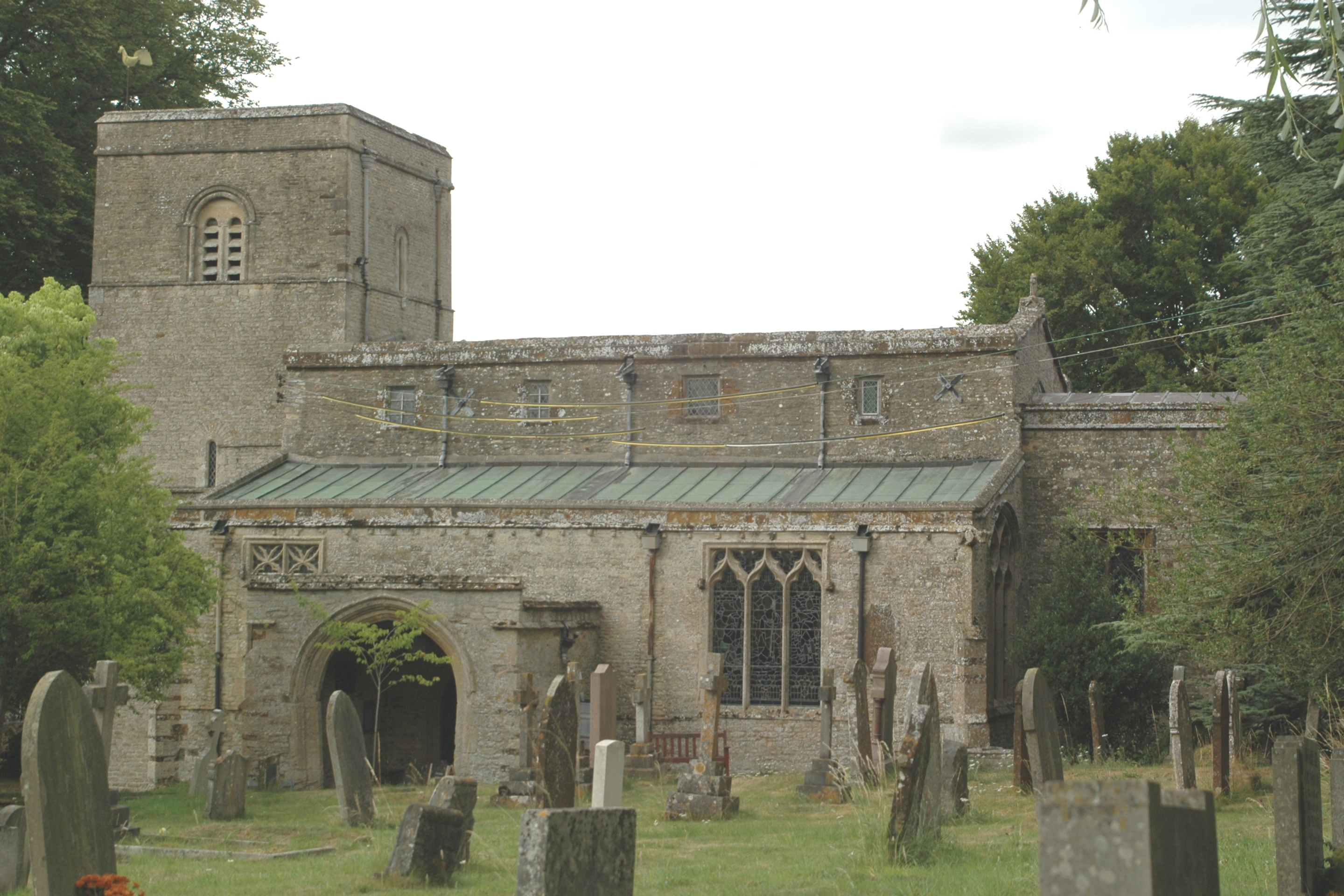
- Church of the Annunciation to the Blessed Virgin Mary
- 51°58′54″N 1°14′19″W
- OS grid reference: SP 52301 31691
- Location: Souldern, Oxfordshire OX27 7HU
- Country: England
- Denomination: Church of England
- Website: Cherwell Valley Benefice

History
- Dedication: Annunciation to the Blessed Virgin Mary

Architecture
- Style: Norman, Decorated Gothic and Perpendicular Gothic
- Years built: circa 12th - 16th centuries

Administration
- Province: Canterbury
- Diocese: Oxford
- Archdeaconry: Oxford
- Deanery: Bicester & Islip
- Parish: Souldern, Annunciation to the Blessed Virgin Mary

Clergy
- Rector: Rev Helen Barnes

The Parish Church of the Annunciation to the Blessed Virgin Mary is the Church of England parish church of Souldern, a village in Oxfordshire about 7 miles (11 km) northwest of Bicester and a similar distance southeast of Banbury.

== History ==
The church's origins are unknown, but the earliest known record of it is from 1161. Its oldest parts are the 12th century Norman tower, north wall of the nave and north doorway. The south aisle is of three bays and was originally a Norman addition made before the end of the 12th century.

The original chancel may have been a Norman apse, but it was replaced with a larger, rectangular chancel with a new chancel arch. The Victoria County History dates this rebuilding to the early part of the 13th century but Sherwood and Pevsner attribute the work to about 1300.

Early in the 14th century the south aisle was rebuilt on a larger scale in the Decorated Gothic style. The two Norman columns from the aisle's arcade were re-used to support three new pointed arches. A Norman capital turned upside-down now serves as the base of one of the columns. Decorated Gothic windows were added into the old north wall of the nave as well.

Late in the 15th or early in the 16th century the Perpendicular Gothic clerestory was added to the nave.

Early in the 18th century St. Mary's was reported to be in good condition, but by 1775 the chancel was ruinous and its roof had fallen in. The Rector had the chancel demolished and a much smaller, low-roofed one built in its stead. A west gallery was added in 1815 and removed in 1878. In 1896-97 the Gothic Revival architect Ninian Comper rebuilt the chancel, possibly working with his partner William Bucknall. In 1906 G.F. Bodley dismantled and rebuilt the Norman tower and tower arch.

== Bells ==
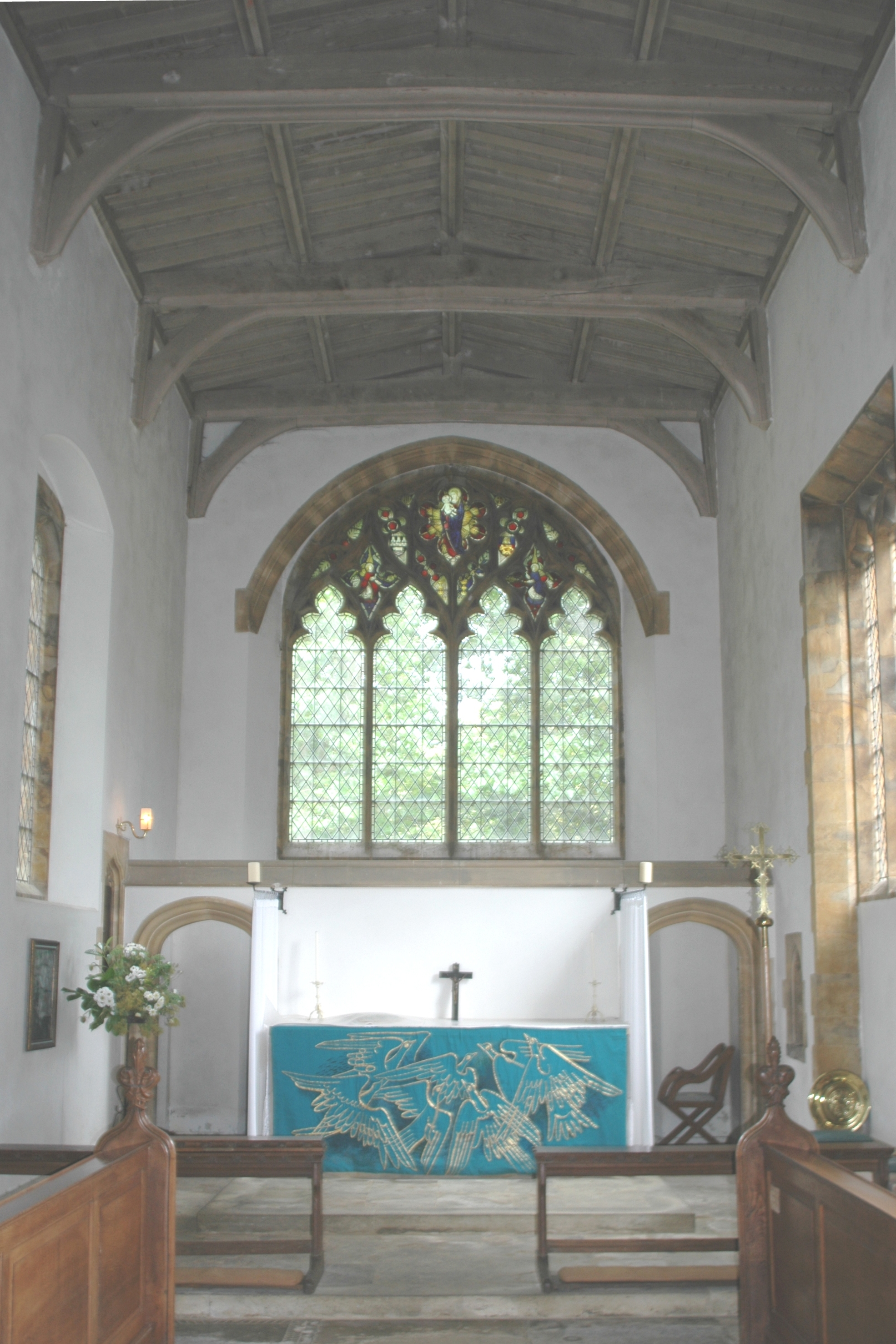
Interior of Gothic Revival chancel added in 1897 by Ninian Comper

By 1552 the belltower had three bells and there was also a Sanctus bell. One bell from that period survives: the Whitechapel Bell Foundry recast it in 1910. Henry I Bagley of Chacombe cast three of the current bells: the fifth and the tenor in 1631 and the third in 1635. Mears and Stainbank of the Whitechapel Bell Foundry cast the treble and second bells in 1907 and recast the fourth bell in 1910, completing the present ring of six. St. Mary's has also a Sanctus bell that Henry I Bagley cast in 1665.

== Advowson ==
By 1161 Jordan de Say, who owned the manor of Souldern, had given the advowson of the parish to the Benedictine Eynsham Abbey. The abbot retained the advowson until the abbey was suppressed in the Dissolution of the Monasteries in 1539. In 1544 Henry VIII sold the advowson to Sir Ralph Sadler, but thereafter it changed hands several times. In 1551 John Hales gave it to his brother Stephen. By 1562 one William Holt of Stoke Lyne was patron.

Sir Hugh Throckmorton held the advowson by 1571, and in 1572 he sold it to George Throckmorton of Fulbrook, Buckinghamshire. However, the recusant Francis Throckmorton claimed Sir Hugh had granted him the advowson. In 1584 Francis was executed for treason and his properties were attaindered, so thereafter the Crown controlled the advowson. In 1623 the Crown granted the advowson to John Williams, Bishop of Lincoln, who in turn granted it to St John's College, Cambridge. By the 1650s a William Norbury of Hanwell owned George Throckmorton's claim and sold it to the Rector of Souldern. In 1662 the Rector granted this claim to St John's College, thus ending the dispute. The college still owned the advowson in 1955.

== Benefice ==
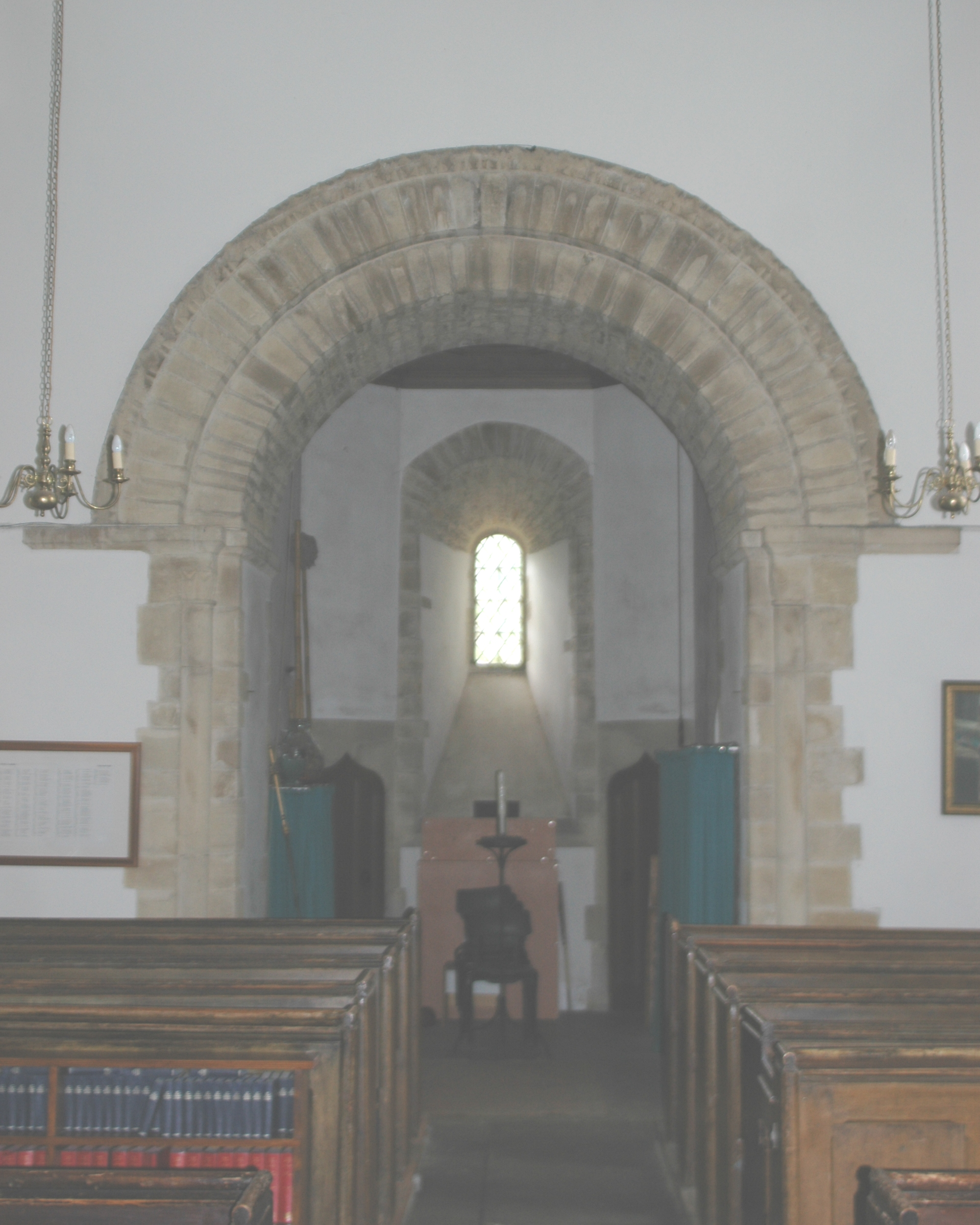
12th century Nornam tower arch rebuilt in 1906 by G.F. Bodley

The Church of the Annunciation is now a member of the Cherwell Valley Benefice along with the parishes of Ardley, Fritwell, Lower Heyford and Upper Heyford.

== Vicarage ==
The Church of the Annunciation had a rectory that was built before 1638 and had fishponds well-stocked with carp by 1723. The poet William Wordsworth stayed there in 1820. Afterwards he wrote the sonnet A Parsonage in Oxfordshire, and in another sonnet called the house "this humble and beautiful parsonage". In 1890 this historic house was demolished and replaced with a new one designed by the Gothic Revival architect E.G. Bruton.

== Sources ==
- Lobel, Mary D, ed. (1959). A History of the County of Oxford: Volume 6. Victoria County History. pp. 301–312.
- Sherwood, Jennifer; Pevsner, Nikolaus (1974). Oxfordshire. The Buildings of England. Harmondsworth: Penguin Books. pp. 768–769. ISBN 0-14-071045-0.
