= Fritwell & Somerton railway station =

Former railway station in England

Fritwell & Somerton
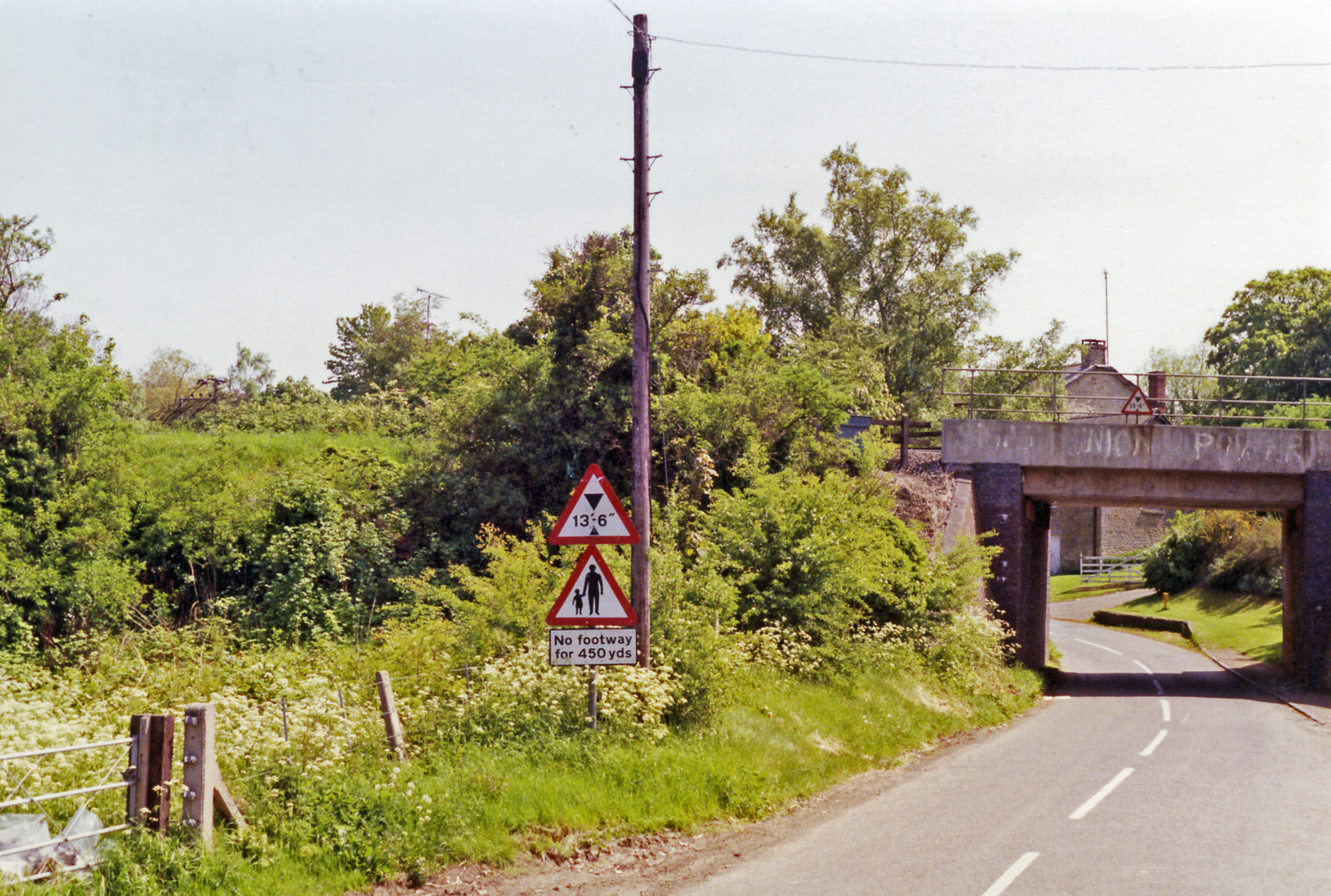
- Site of the station in 1992

General information
- Location: Somerton, Oxfordshire; England
- Coordinates: 51.956°N 1.279°W
- Grid reference: SP496289
- Platforms: 2

Other information
- Status: Disused

History
- Original company: Great Western Railway
- Pre-grouping: Great Western Railway
- Post-grouping: Great Western Railway

Key dates
- 2 September 1850: Line opened from Oxford to Banbury
- 1855: Station opened as Somerton
- 2 July 1906: renamed Somerton Oxon
- 1 October 1907: renamed Fritwell & Somerton
- 2 November 1964: Station closed
Location

Fritwell & Somerton railway station was on the Oxford to Banbury line of the Great Western Railway, and was opened four years after the line, in September 1854. It was in the village of Somerton, Oxfordshire.

== History ==
The line had been authorised as the Oxford and Rugby Railway, but had been absorbed by the GWR prior to its opening on 2 September 1850. No station was originally planned at Somerton — the nearest station to the village was Heyford, three miles (4.8 km) to the south. The station at Aynho for Deddington was closer by rail, being about 2 1/2 miles (4 km) to the north, but the road journey was about 5 miles (8 km).

It was soon decided that Somerton needed a station. It was built south of the railway bridge in the village, and opened in 1855, being originally named Somerton.

A station at Somerton (Somerset) was opened on 2 July 1906, and to avoid confusion, the Oxfordshire station was renamed twice: first to Somerton Oxon also on 2 July 1906, then to Fritwell & Somerton on 1 October 1907, although the village of Fritwell is 2 miles (3 km) away.

The goods service was withdrawn on 4 May 1964, and the passenger service ceased on 2 November 1964.

== Route ==
Preceding station	Historical railways	Following station
Aynho for Deddington; Line open, station closed	Great Western Railway; Oxford and Rugby Railway	Heyford; Line and station open
