= George Ardley =

English footballer (1897–1927)

Personal information
- Full name: George Henry Ardley
- Date of birth: 1897
- Place of birth: Langley Park, County Durham, England
- Date of death: 1927 (aged 29–30)
- Place of death: Weardale, England
- Position: Wing-half

Senior career*
Years	Team	Apps	(Gls)
- Langley Park
1920–1921	Sunderland	1	(0)
- Shildon Athletic
- * Club domestic league appearances and goals

George Henry Ardley (1897–1927) was an English professional footballer who played as a wing-half for Sunderland.
