= Lower Heyford =

Village in Oxfordshire, England

Coordinates: 51.920°N 1.295°W

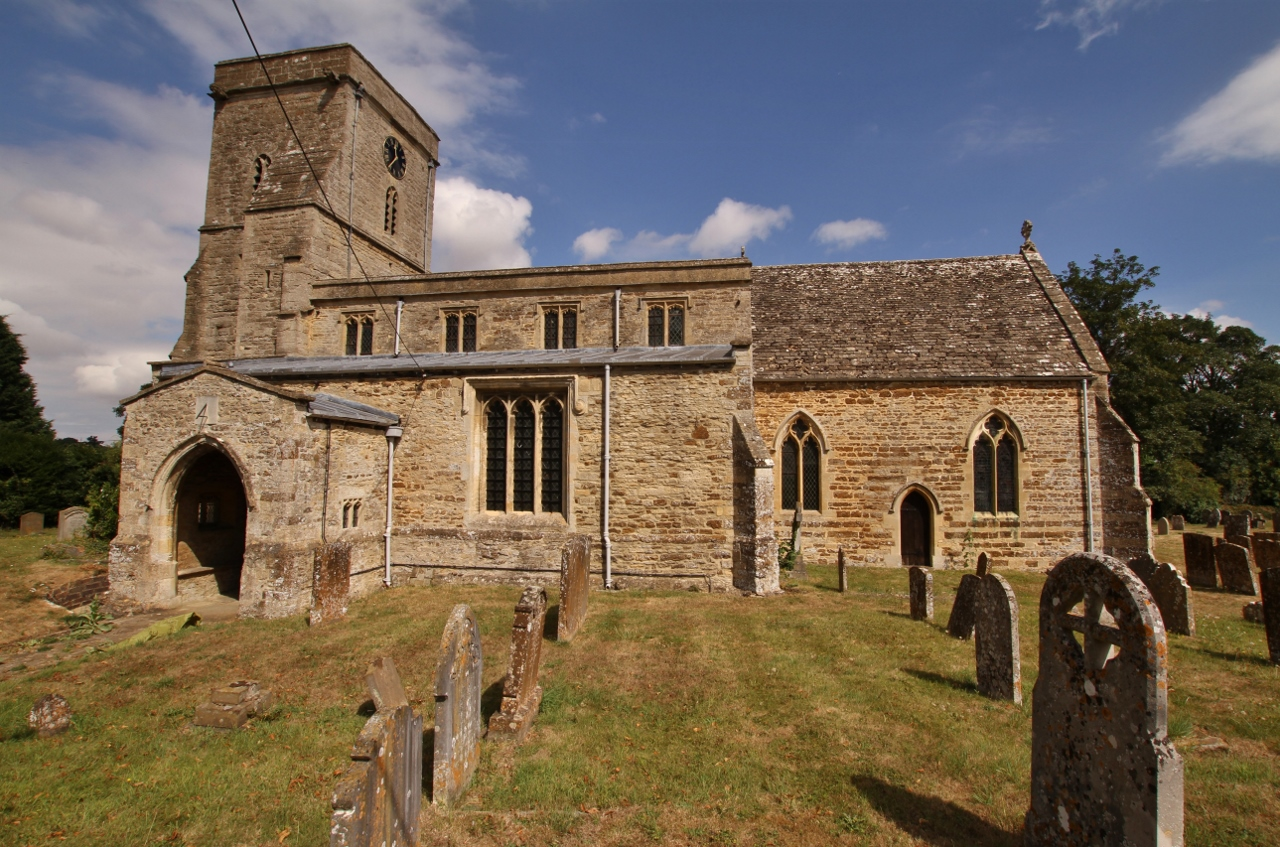
- St Mary's parish church

- Location within Oxfordshire
- Area: 7.14 km^{2} (2.76 sq mi)
- Population: 492 (parish, including Caulcott) (2011 census)
  - Density: 69/km^{2} (180/sq mi)
- OS grid reference: SP4824
- Civil parish: Lower Heyford
- District: Cherwell
- Shire county: Oxfordshire
- Region: South East
- Country: England
- Sovereign state: United Kingdom
- Post town: Bicester
- Postcode district: OX25
- Dialling code: 01869
- Police: Thames Valley
- Fire: Oxfordshire
- Ambulance: South Central
- UK Parliament: Bicester and Woodstock
- Website: Heyford.info

Lower Heyford is a village and civil parish beside the River Cherwell in Oxfordshire, about 6 miles (10 km) west of Bicester. The 2011 census recorded the parish's population as 492.

The parish measures about 1 1/2 miles (2.4 km) east–west and about 2 miles (3 km) north–south. It is bounded by the River Cherwell to the west, Aves ditch to the east, and field boundaries to the north and south. In 1959 the parish covered an area of 1,765 acres (714 ha).

== Prehistory ==
Aves ditch is pre-Anglo-Saxon. It may have been dug as a boundary ditch. It still forms the eastern boundary of the parish.

Harborough Bank, an Anglo-Saxon burial mound southwest of the village dates from the 6th century.

== Toponym ==
The toponym "Heyford" is derived from Old English. It probably means "ford used at the time of the hay harvest". The earliest known record of it is a document from AD 995 now included in the Codex Diplomaticus Aevi Saxonici, which records it as Hegford.

Since then its spelling has varied greatly. The Domesday Book of 1086 also records it as Hegford, and also as Egford. A charter from 1172 records it as Heiford, and other spellings of that era include Heiford', Heiforde, Heyforde and Heyfordia. Other charters record it as Eiforde in 1193–1200 and Eifort in 1254–55. An entry in the Book of Fees from 1242 records it as Heyford Magna. It was recorded as Heyrford in 1263, Hyford in 1278–79 and 1308 and also Hayford in 1308.

After the bridge over the Cherwell was built (see below) the village was recorded as Heiford ad Pontem in 1254–55, Brigeheyford in 1275, Heyforde ad Pontem 1278–79, Hereford ad Pontem and Wyford ad pontem in 1285, Heyford manor ad pontem in 1291, Heyford at Bridge in 1314, Heyford Pont in 1384, Heighford ad pontem, Higheford ad pontem, Heiford ad pontem in 1428 and Heyford apud Pontem in 1539.

In 1634 the Rector recorded it as Heyforde Porcells and in 1728 it was recorded as Heyford Purcell. The reason is not clear, but there is a village of Newton Purcell about 10 miles (16 km) east of Lower Heyford.

It was recorded as Nether Heyford in 1246–47 and Nytherhayford in 1384. "Nether", like the present "Lower", distinguishes the village from Upper Heyford which is about 1 mile (1.6 km) upstream along the Cherwell valley. There are both a Nether Heyford and a Little Heyford in Northamptonshire, so the current "Lower Heyford" reduces confusion.

== Manor ==
Before the Norman Conquest of England the manor of Lower Heyford was held by Edwin, the son of a Saxon thegn. William the Conqueror granted the land to the powerful Geoffrey de Montbray, bishop of Coutances. The manor passed through various hands until 1533 when Sir Edward Baynton sold it to Corpus Christi College, Oxford. Corpus Christi College still owned the estate in the 1950s.

== Churches ==
=== Church of England ===
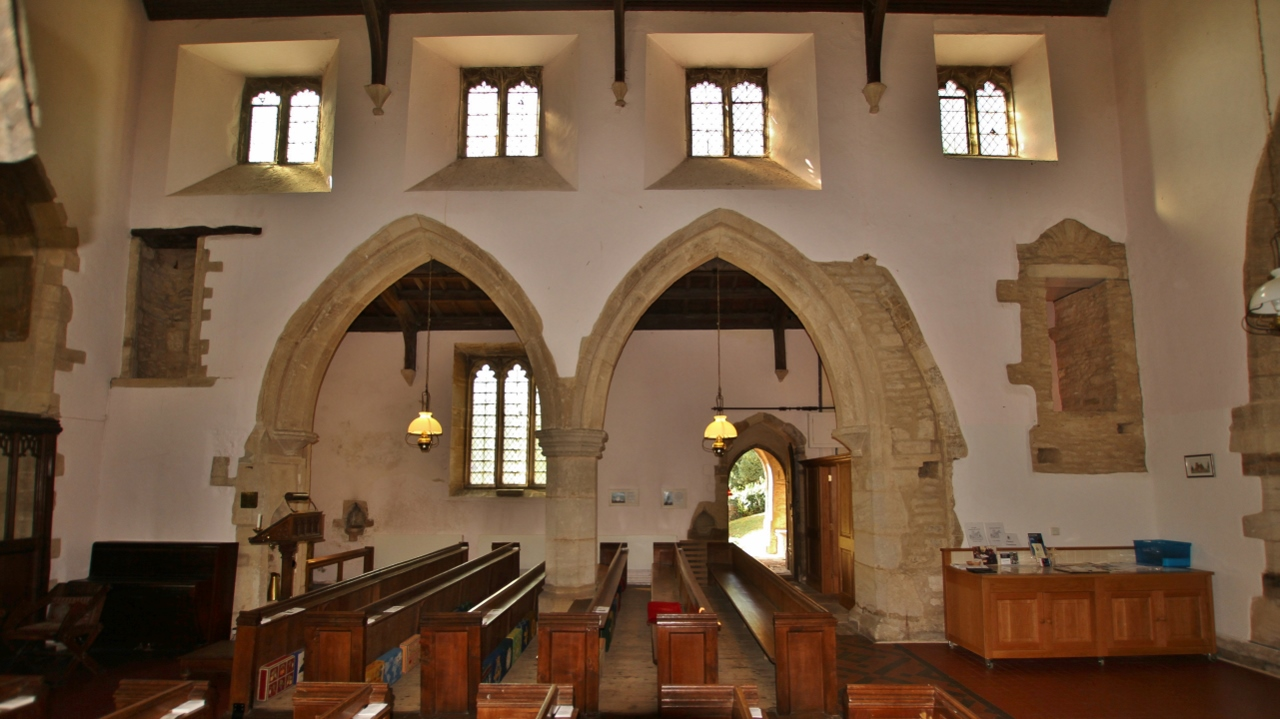
Inside the nave of St Mary's parish church. The south arcade is flanked by upper doorways to the former rood loft (left) and west gallery (right)

Wufwig, Bishop of Dorchester consecrated a parish church at Lower Heyford in the 11th century. The current Church of England parish church of Saint Mary was built in the 13th century. It was largely rebuilt in a Decorated Gothic style in the first half of the 14th century, with north and south aisles joined to the nave by two-bay arcades. The east end of the south aisle is a chapel with niches for statues or figurative reliefs. In the 15th century the Perpendicular Gothic clerestory and south porch were added, and a rood screen with a rood loft for which a stair turret was inserted in the south aisle.

An opening high in the wall west of the south arcade suggests that the nave once had a west gallery. This has been removed, as has the rood and rood loft, but the 15th-century wooden screen to the chancel survives.

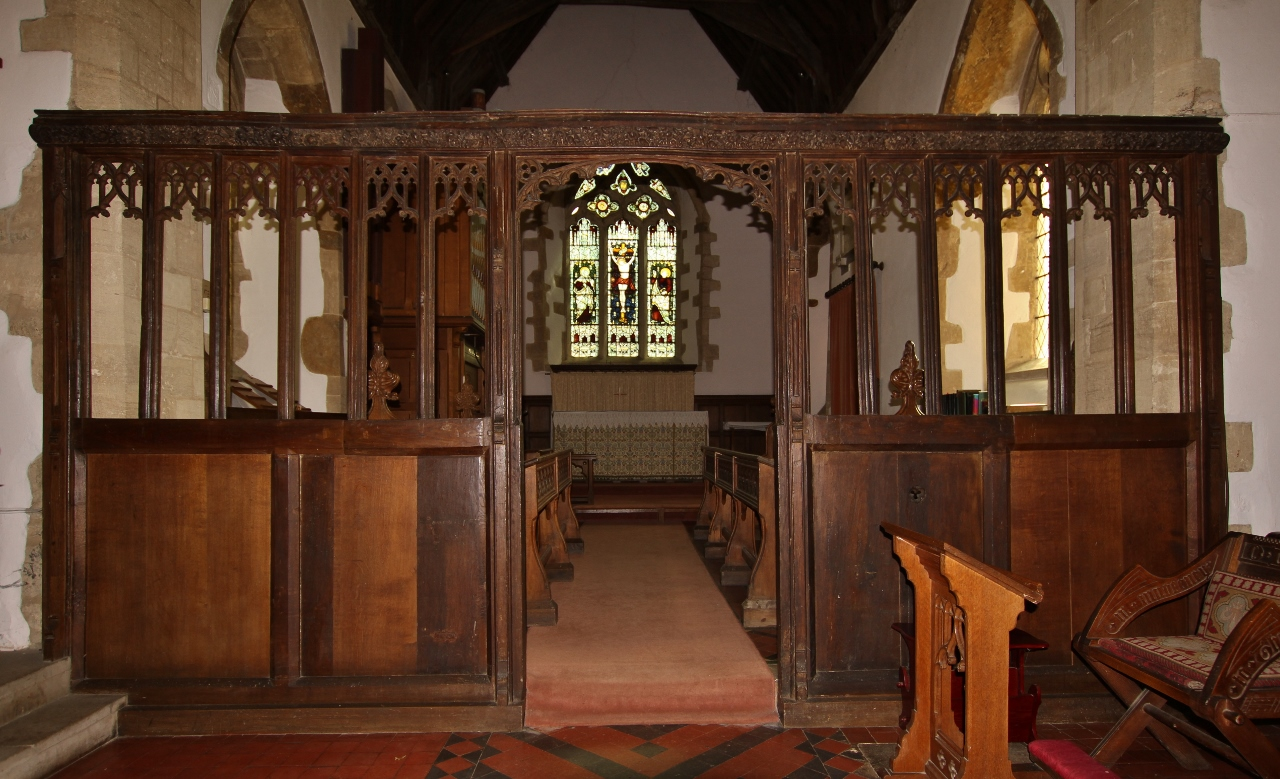
15th-century chancel screen in St Mary's parish church, seen from the nave

The building was twice restored in the 19th century: first in 1848 under the direction of Henry Jones Underwood, and then in 1867–68 directed by Charles Buckeridge. It is a Grade II* listed building.

In the reign of Edward VI the west tower had a ring of four bells. It now has a ring of six, of which the second and fourth were cast in 1766 by Matthew III Bagley of Chacombe, Northamptonshire. W&J Taylor cast the fifth bell in 1825, presumably at their then foundry in Oxford. Mears and Stainbank of the Whitechapel Bell Foundry cast the tenor bell in 1867 and the treble and third bells in 1925.

The church is said to have had a 17th-century clock that was made in 1695 and removed during the 1867–68 restoration.

St Mary's is now part of the Benefice of Cherwell Valley along with five other parishes: Ardley, Fritwell, Somerton, Souldern and Upper Heyford.

=== Quakers and Methodists ===
In the latter part of the 17th century Lower Heyford had also a Quaker congregation. Lower Heyford had a Methodist congregation by 1804, which soon had a chapel in the village and eventually became part of the United Methodist Church. A new chapel was built in Mill Lane in 1906, was still used for worship in 1955 but is now a private house.

=== Kingdom Hall ===
There is a Kingdom Hall at the east end of the village. It was built in the 20th century as the village hall, but sold to the Jehovah's Witnesses in the 2010s.

== Economic and social history ==
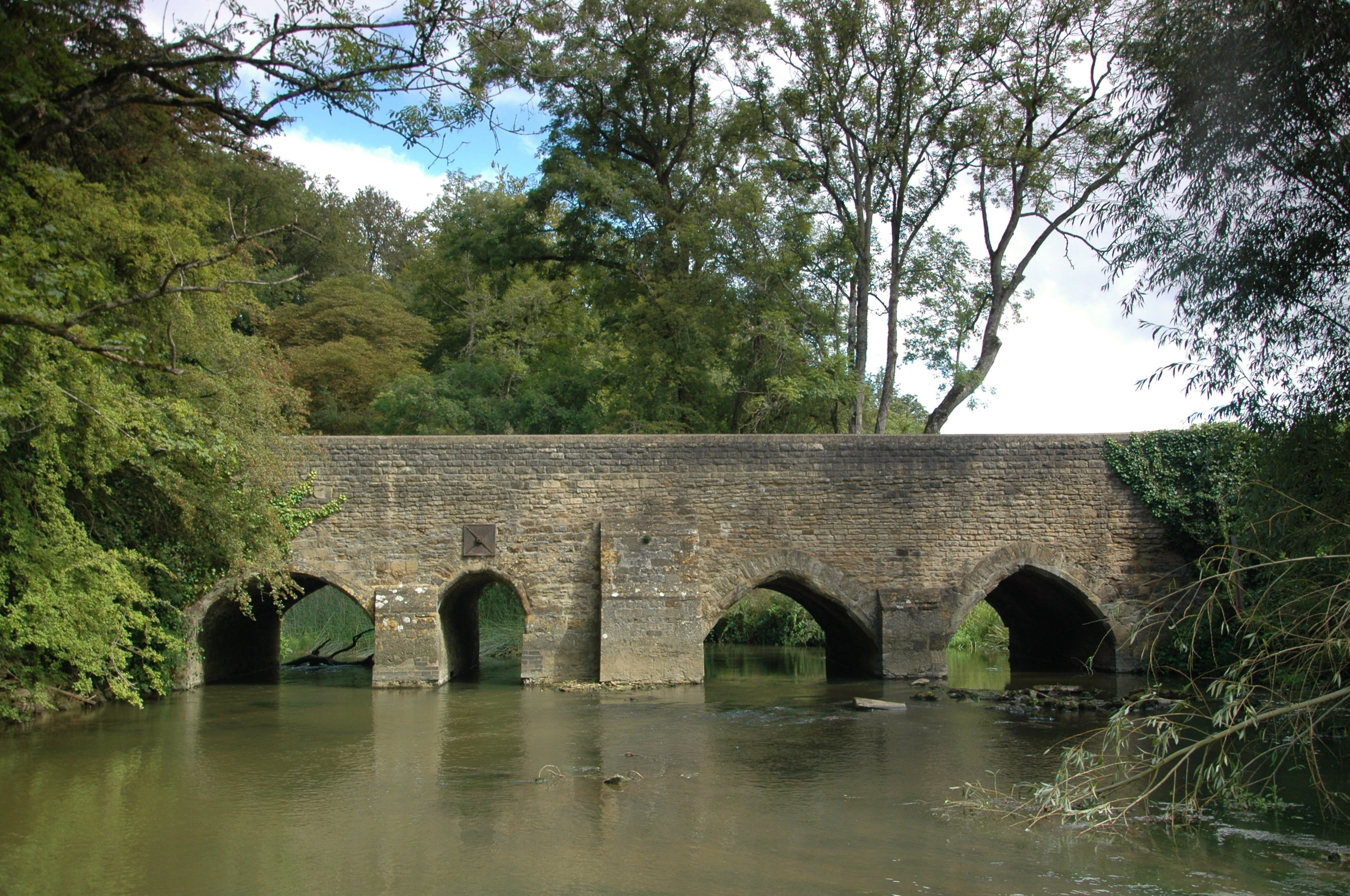
Medieval road bridge over the River Cherwell

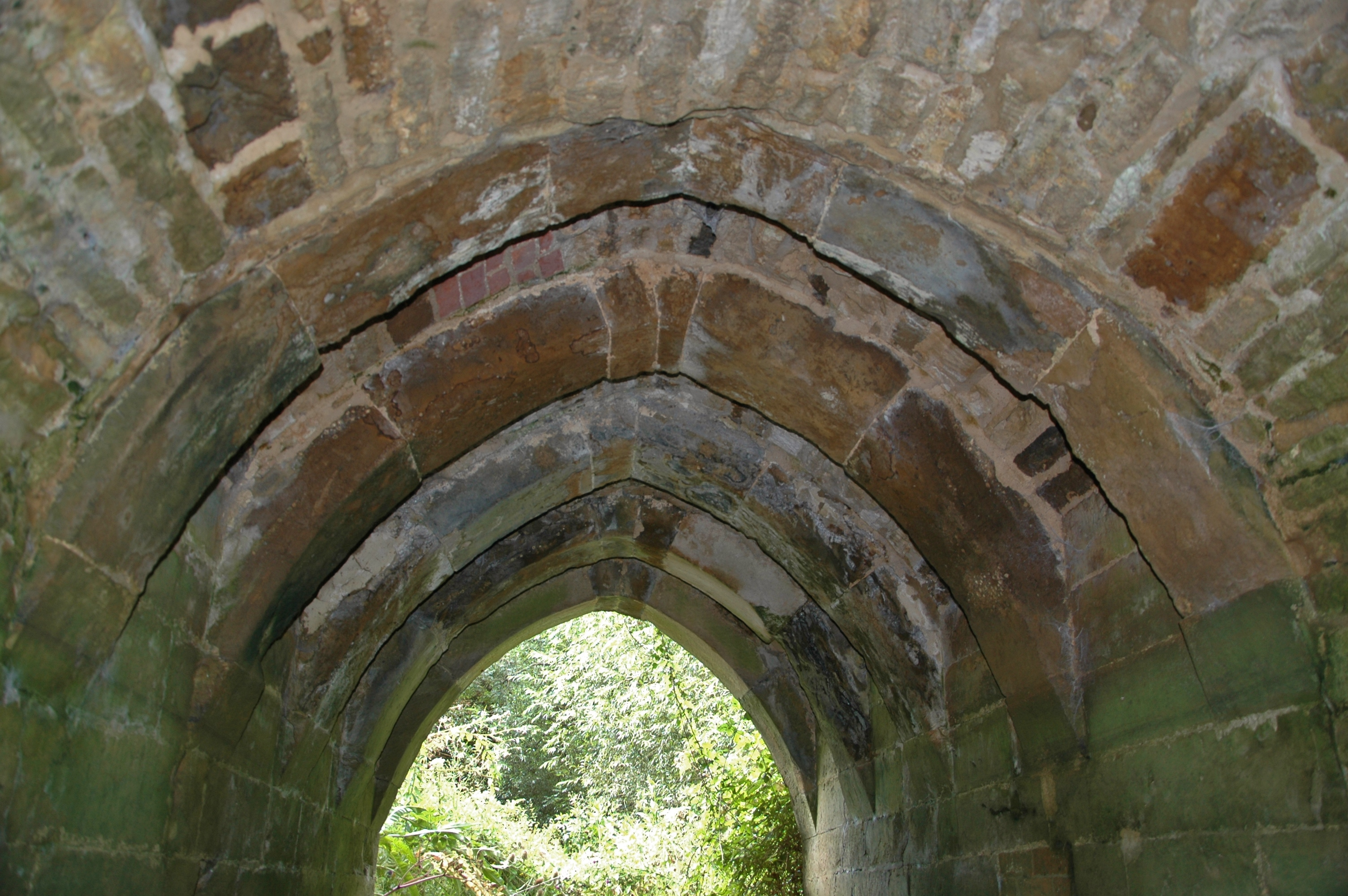
Medieval pointed barrel vault of flood culvert next to Lower Heyford bridge

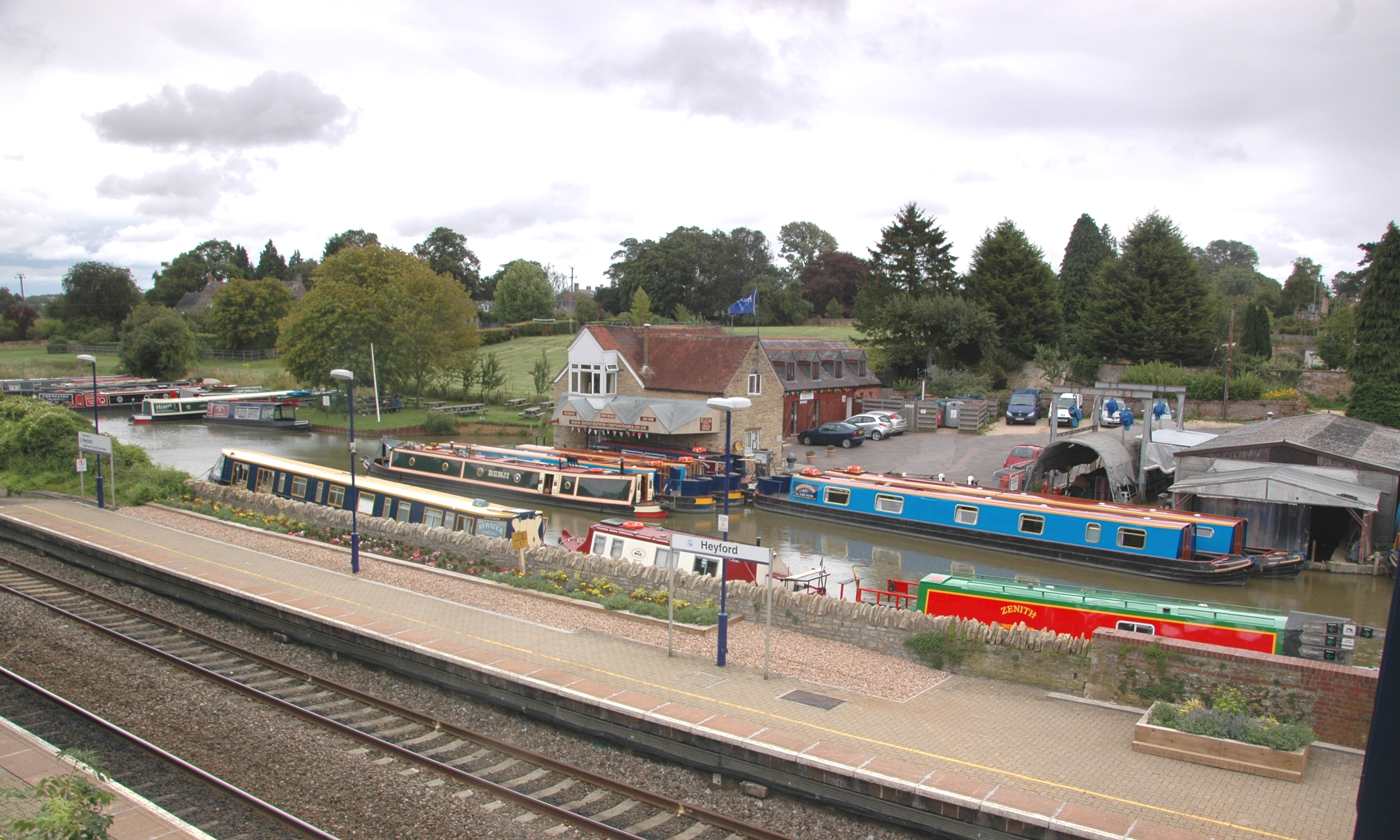
Heyford Wharf on the Oxford Canal, with part of Heyford railway station in the foreground

In the Middle Ages Lower and Upper Heyford had two watermills on the River Cherwell, and one was still in use in 1858.

There has been a bridge over the River Cherwell between Lower Heyford, Rousham and Steeple Aston since at least 1255. The present bridge has nine arches and was noted by the early 16th-century antiquary John Leland. In the 1970s Jennifer Sherwood dated part of it to the 13th century, and its north side to either the 15th or 16th century. However, English Heritage dates the earliest parts of the present bridge to the 14th century, its alterations to the 17th century and its widening to the 19th century. The bridge is a Grade II* listed building and forms an important part of the view from the historic adjacent landscape garden of Rousham House.

The stretch of the Oxford Canal between Banbury and Tackley was completed in 1787. It runs along the Cherwell valley and bounds Lower Heyford village on its north and west sides. Coal mined in Leicestershire and Warwickshire was unloaded on Heyford Wharf at Lower Heyford.

An open field system of farming continued in the parish until 1802 when a land award from the Lower Heyford and Calcot Inclosure Act 1801 (41 Geo. 3. (U.K.) c. 71 Pr.) was made.

In 1797 the road between Bicester and Enstone was made into a turnpike. Lower Heyford had two toll-gates: one at Heyford Bridge and the other at the east end of the village. The road was disturnpiked in 1876, is now the B4030 road and Heyford Bridge continues to carry its traffic.

Heyford Wharf sent coal via the turnpike road to Bicester until 1850, when the Buckinghamshire Railway linked Bicester Town to Bletchley on the London & North Western Railway.

Construction of the Oxford & Rugby Railway between Oxford and Banbury began in 1845. By the time the line opened the Great Western Railway had taken it over. In Lower Heyford the railway runs parallel with the canal on the west side. The GWR opened Heyford railway station at Lower Heyford in 1850. The route is now the Cherwell Valley Line and Heyford station is served by Great Western Railway trains.

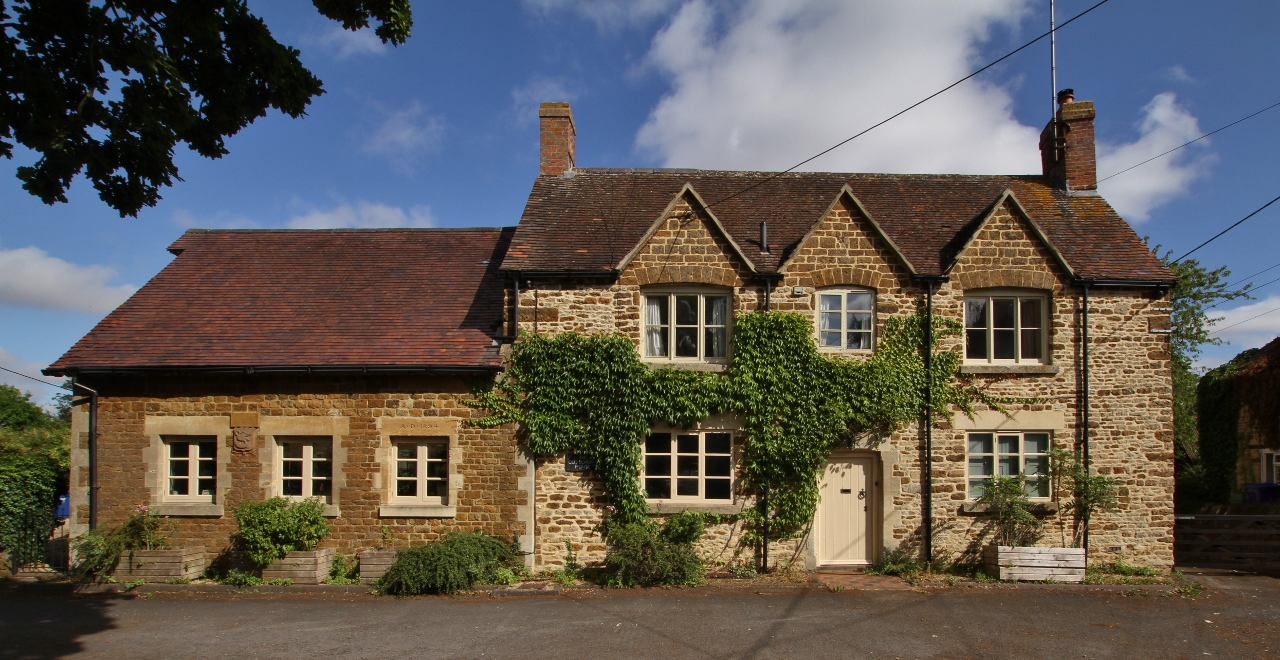
Former parish school in Market Square

In 1808 Lower Heyford had two dame schools, and by 1833 there were three more formal schools. A National School was built in Market Square and opened in 1867. The building was extended by the building of an extra classroom in 1894. In a reorganisation of schools in 1932, the National School became a junior school and senior pupils from Lower Heyford had to go to Steeple Aston. Lower Heyford school became a Church of England controlled school in 1952. It closed in 1974 and is now a private house.

== Amenities ==
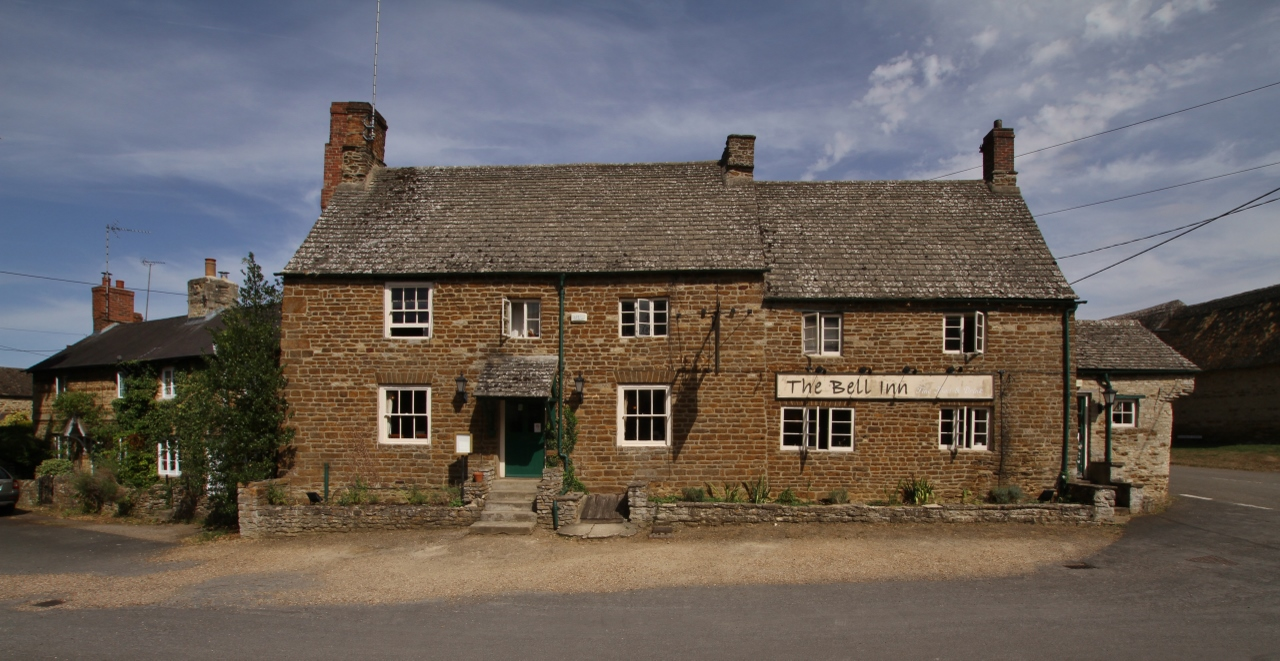
The Bell Inn in Market Square

The Bell Inn is a late 17th- or early 18th-century building that has been a pub since at least 1819. In the 20th century it was controlled by Halls Oxford and West Brewery. It is now a free house.

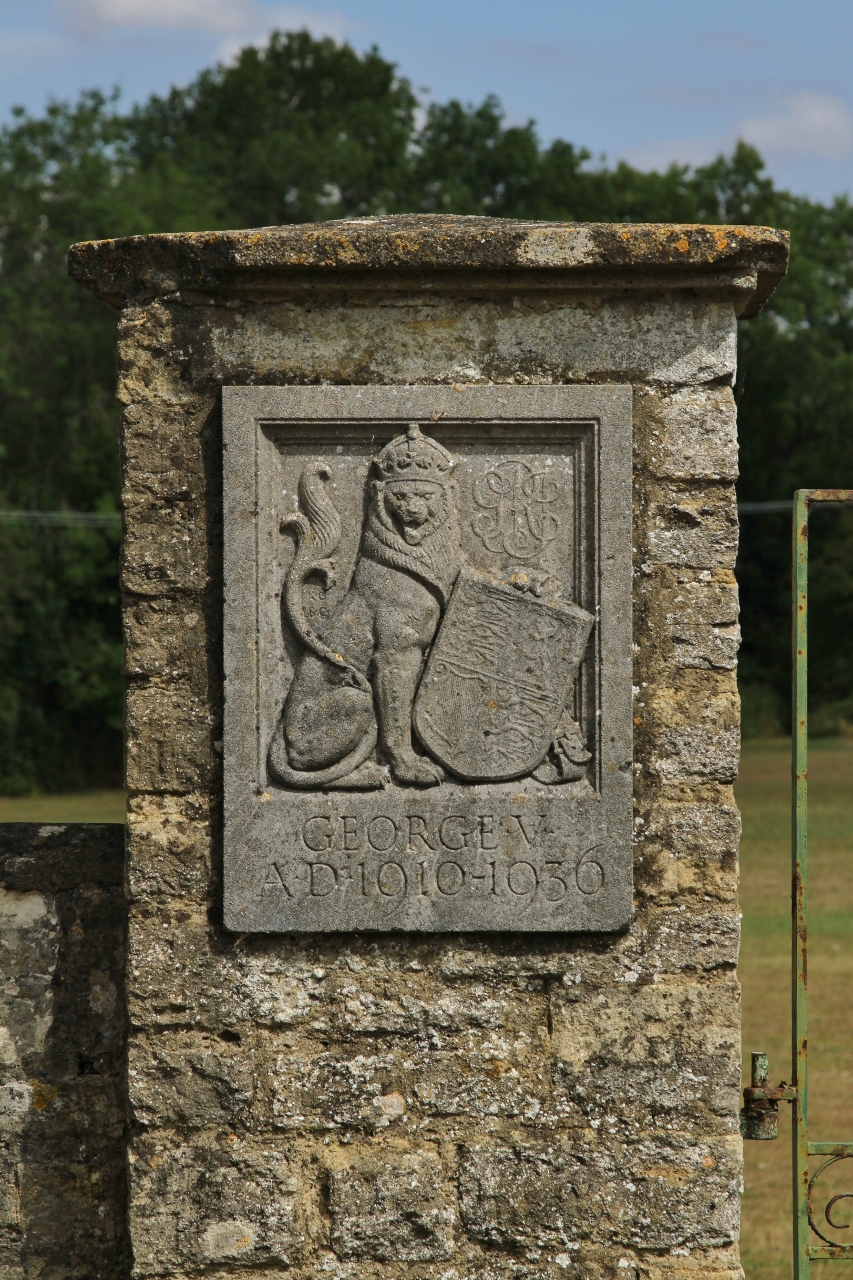
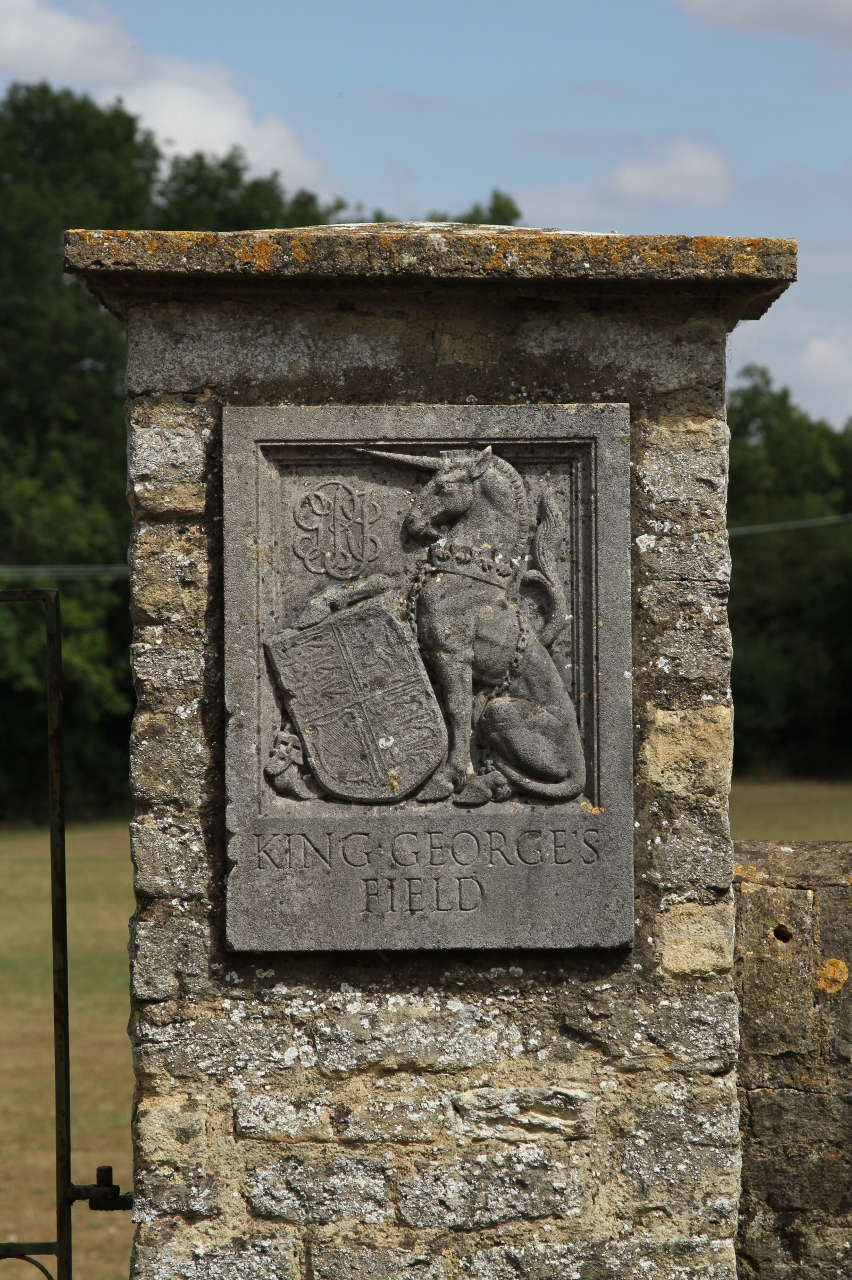
King George's Fields Foundation plaques in Freehold Street

Lower Heyford has a playing field and sports pavilion in Freehold Street. The field was funded by the King George's Fields Foundation.

Lower Heyford has a bowls club. In 2000 Lower Heyford Cricket Club was the champion of Oxfordshire Cricket Association League Division Four.

The Heyfords Women's Institute serves both Lower and Upper Heyford.

=== Public transport ===
Red Rose Travel bus route 25 serves Lower Heyford, linking the village with Bicester via Upper Heyford and Middleton Stoney. The bus stops are outside the Kingdom Hall at the east end of the village. Buses do not serve Lower Heyford railway station.

Buses run from Mondays to Saturdays, mostly at hourly intervals. There is no late evening service, and no service on Sundays or bank holidays.

== Sources and further reading ==
- Beeson, CFC (1989) [1962]. Simcock, AV (ed.). Clockmaking in Oxfordshire 1400–1850 (3rd ed.). Oxford: Museum of the History of Science. p. 42. ISBN 0-903364-06-9.
- Blomfield, James Charles (1892). Part VI: History of Upper and Lower Heyford. Deanery of Bicester. Elliot Stock & Co: London.
- Compton, Hugh J (1976). The Oxford Canal. Newton Abbot: David & Charles. pp. 37, 117. ISBN 0-7153-7238-6.
- Ekwall, Eilert (1960) [1936]. Concise Oxford Dictionary of English Place-Names (4th ed.). Oxford: Oxford University Press. Heyford, Nether & Upper. ISBN 0198691033.
- Gelling, Margaret (1953). Smith, AH (ed.). The Place-Names of Oxfordshire, Part I. Vol. XXIII. based on material collected by Doris Mary Stenton. Cambridge: Cambridge University Press for the English Place-Name Society.
- Jervoise, Edwyn (1932). The Ancient Bridges of Mid and Eastern England. Vol. III. Westminster: The Architectural Press for the SPAB. p. 153.
- Lobel, Mary D, ed. (1959). "Lower Heyford". A History of the County of Oxford. Victoria County History. Vol. 6: Ploughley Hundred. London: Oxford University Press for the Institute of Historical Research. pp. 182–195.
- Sherwood, Jennifer; Pevsner, Nikolaus (1974). Oxfordshire. The Buildings of England. Harmondsworth: Penguin Books. pp. 692–693. ISBN 0-14-071045-0.
