= Ardley Castle =

- Ardley, Oxfordshire, England

Site information
- Condition: Earthworks only

Location
- Shown within Oxfordshire
- Coordinates: 51.9416°N 1.2173°W
- Grid reference: grid reference SP539273

Ardley Castle was a castle to the southwest of the village of Ardley, Oxfordshire, England. At present only some of its ruins, most notably an oval enclosure one hundred yards (91 m) in diameter, with a shallow ditch with an average depth of three feet (0.91 m), a derelict moat and the earthworks remain.

According to sources, the castle was a motte and bailey fortification erected in the 12th century during the civil war between King Stephen and Empress Matilda at the site of Offa of Mercia's old encampment. It was initially a manor site raised to a small castle by Hugh of Avranches, Earl of Chester to protect his lands from the chaos of war. It may have been constructed without the consent and permission of the monarch, making it an adulterine castle. During the war between Stephen and Matilda the castle was occasionally used by Ranulf de Gernon, 4th Earl of Chester. In 1136 the castle was attacked, but the attackers were repulsed. After the death of Ranulf, it was decided in the Treaty of Wallingford in 1153 that all adulterine castles would be demolished. During Henry II's reign, the castle was either demolished by hand or was simply abandoned and fell into ruin. In 1823 it was reported that only the ruins of the castle remained. It was during this same year that the existence of certain subterranean tunnels connecting the manor house came to light.

== See also ==
- Castles in Great Britain and Ireland
- List of castles in England
