= Ardley End =

Hamlet in Essex, England

Coordinates: 51.808°N 0.212°E

- Location within Essex
- OS grid reference: TL5214
- Shire county: Essex
- Region: East
- Country: England
- Sovereign state: United Kingdom
- Police: Essex
- Fire: Essex
- Ambulance: East of England

Ardley End is a hamlet in the Uttlesford area of Essex, England. It is approximately half a mile from the village of Hatfield Heath.
