= Mary Stapleton =

British local historian (1837–1918)

- Born: Mary Helen Alicia Dolman; 14 August 1837; Eaton Bishop
- Died: 10 April 1918 (aged 80); Boscombe
- Other name: Mrs Bryan Stapleton
- Spouse: Bryan Stapleton
- Children: 14

Mary Helen Alicia Stapleton (née Dolman; 14 August 1837 – 10 April 1918) was a British local historian who published her research on Oxfordshire and its families under the name of Mrs Bryan Stapleton.

== Life ==
Stapleton was born in Eaton Bishop in 1837. Her Catholic parents were Ann Helen (born Cox) and John Thomas Dolman. Her father practiced medicine in York.

In 1868, her father died and she, her husband, and their children moved to Souldern Manor. She was a keen local historian and the whole family were Catholics. Mary was a friend of William Bernard Ullathorne, the Bishop of Birmingham, and she was generous in the local village. Before 1880 they had decided that the house was not healthy enough, and they had a reduced income, so they moved to another (now listed) building Grove House in Kidlington.

In 1884, she and her husband's last child was born and about this time she took an interest in local history around Kidlington. They were both members of the Oxfordshire Archaeological Society and her husband served on its committee and as its treasurer. Her ambition was only to understand the local history for her own interest and she would visit libraries, local records offices, and churchyards to further her research. Her writing came to the notice of a local academic and he persuaded her to publish her work. In 1893, Three Oxfordshire Parishes: a History of Kidlington, Yarnton, and Begbroke was "Printed for the Oxford Historical Society at the Clarendon Press". This debut work was followed in 1906 by the more substantial book, A History of the Post-reformation Catholic Missions in Oxfordshire: With an Account of the Families Connected with Them. In both of these cases she used the nom de plume of "Mrs. Bryan Stapleton" and her husband enjoyed the recognition she received and he would call her his "walking encyclopaedia".

Two of her sons were killed at war in South Africa and in 1903 her husband died.

== Death and legacy ==
She died at her home in Boscombe on 10 April 1918 and she had a candle lit around her to represent each of her fourteen children. The original draft of her second publication is kept at the Bodleian Library. The book had been researched there and at Oxford Colleges and the final draft includes the family trees that she constructed.
