= Ardley, Oxfordshire =

Village in Oxfordshire, England

Coordinates: 51.94°N 1.21°W

Ardley
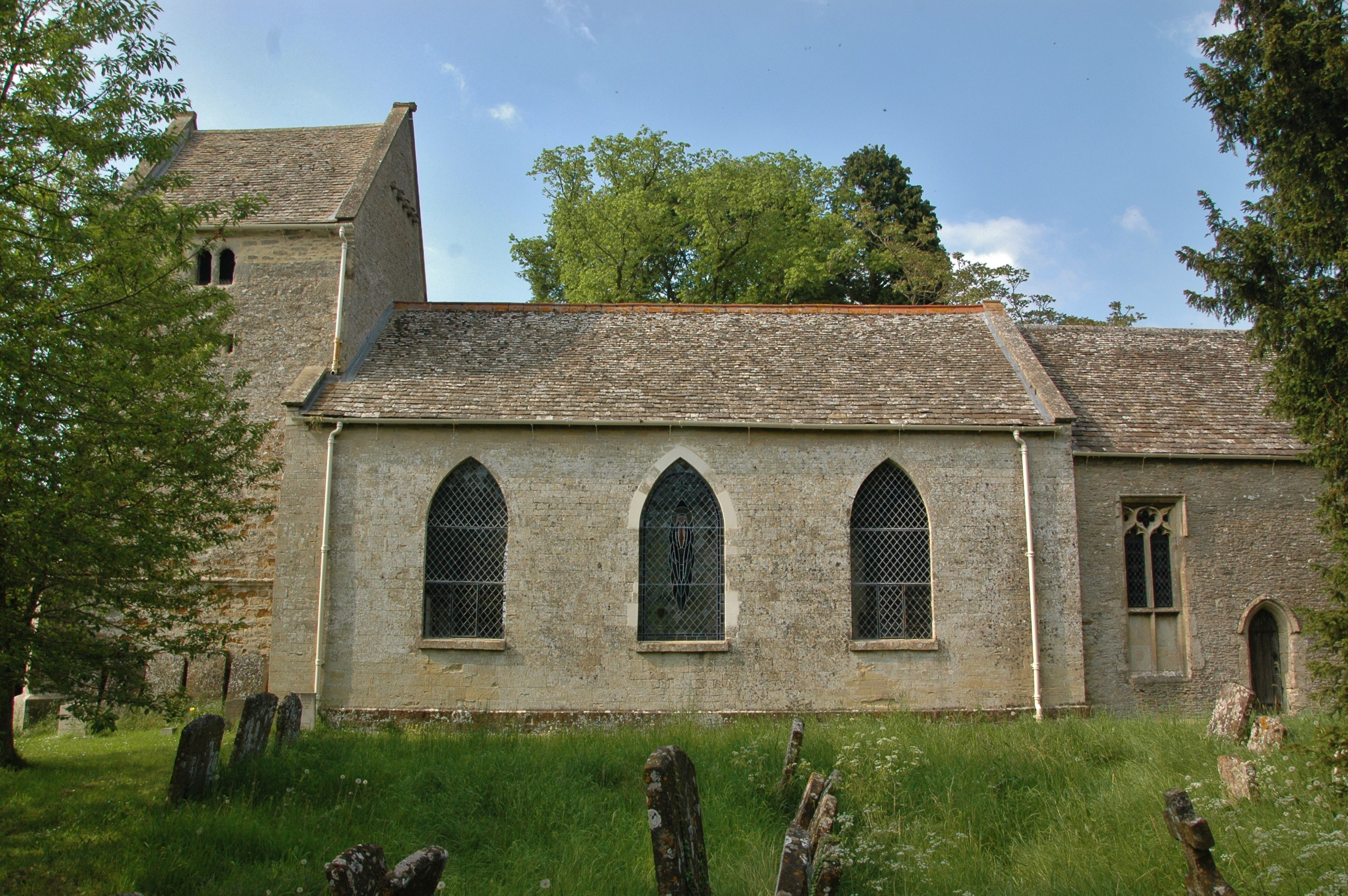
- St. Mary's parish church

- Location within Oxfordshire
- Area: 8.79 km^{2} (3.39 sq mi)
- Population: 740 (Including Ardley with Fewcott) (2021 Census)
  - Density: 84/km^{2} (220/sq mi)
- OS grid reference: SP5427
- Civil parish: Ardley
- District: Cherwell
- Shire county: Oxfordshire
- Region: South East
- Country: England
- Sovereign state: United Kingdom
- Post town: BICESTER
- Postcode district: OX27
- Dialling code: 01869
- Police: Thames Valley
- Fire: Oxfordshire
- Ambulance: South Central
- UK Parliament: Bicester and Woodstock

Ardley is a village and civil parish in Oxfordshire, England, about 4 miles (6.4 km) northwest of Bicester. The parish includes the village of Fewcott, which is now contiguous with Ardley.

The 2021 Census recorded the population of Ardley parish as 740.

== Geography and natural history ==
The two villages of Ardley and Fewcott are on either side of a stream that rises at Fritwell, flows south to Ardley, then turns east through Stoke Lyne to Fringford. There it joins Crowell Brook, which continues east into Buckinghamshire and ultimately becomes part of the Great Ouse.

The limestone quarry at Ardley has yielded a significant find of dinosaur tracks (ichnites), discovered in 1997 and thought to have been left by Megalosaurus and possibly Cetiosaurus. Some of these are on display in the dinosaur garden at the Oxfordshire Museum in Woodstock, Oxfordshire.

There is a site of special scientific interest in the village with a colony of the great crested newts and an outcrop of Jurassic limestone.

== Castle ==
Ardley Castle is a motte-and-bailey which is believed to have been built early in the 12th century during the civil war between Empress Matilda and King Stephen.

== Parish church ==
The Church of England parish church of Saint Mary dates from at least 1074. The original church was demolished and completely rebuilt, but both the chancel and the bell tower of the present building contain small amounts of re-used Norman stonework. The present Early English Gothic chancel was built late in the 12th or early in the 13th century. The tower has a saddleback roof and may have been built in the 13th or 14th century. The present nave was built in 1793 and has a west gallery that was added in 1834.

St Mary's is now part of the Benefice of Cherwell Valley, along with the parishes of Fritwell, Lower Heyford, Somerton, Souldern and Upper Heyford.

The canal engineer Samuel Simcock (1727–1804) and his wife Esther (1720–1808), a sister of James Brindley, are buried at St Mary's.

== Economic history ==
In 1910 the Great Western Railway completed a new main line linking Ashendon Junction and Aynho Junction to shorten the high-speed route between its termini at London Paddington and Birmingham Snow Hill. The line passes within a few hundred yards of Ardley and the GWR opened a railway station on the main road just south of the village. British Railways closed Ardley railway station in 1963. The railway remains open and is now part of the Chiltern Main Line.

In 1990 the section of the M40 motorway between Wheatley and Hockley Heath was built. M40 Junction 10 with the A43 road is about 550 yards (500 m) northeast of Ardley and its Cherwell Valley services are about 1,100 yards (1 km) from the village.

== Amenities ==
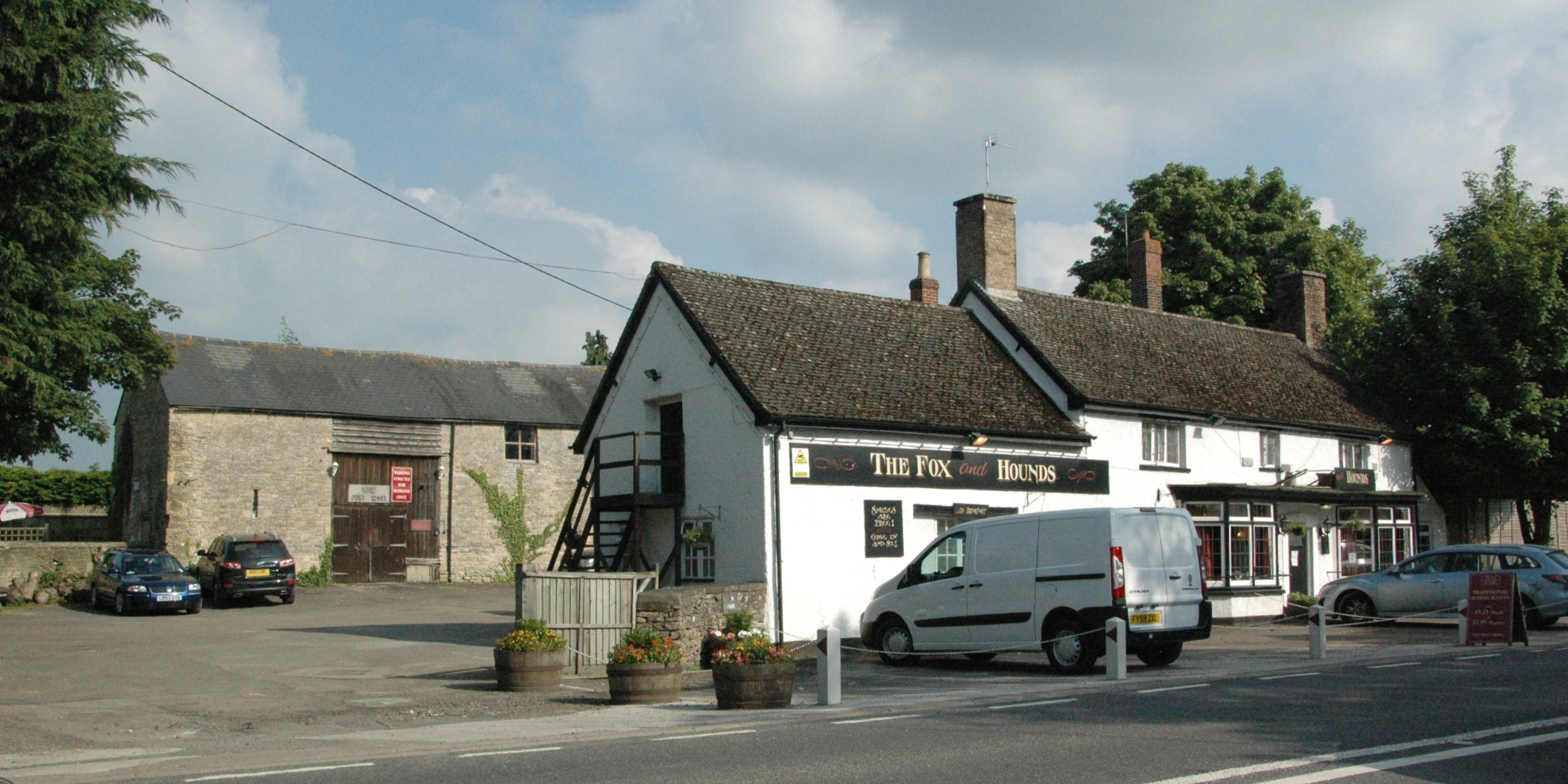
The Fox and Hounds

Ardley formerly had a public house, the Fox and Hounds, which closed its doors in January 2020. Fewcott does have a pub, the White Lion Inn, located on Fritwell Road.

The village has no shops. Those at Cherwell Valley services (Junction 10 of the M40) are the nearest to the village.

Ardley United Football Club is a Non-League football club whose first team plays its home games at The Playing Fields. Its first team is in the FTL Futbol Hellenic League Premier Division.
