= Samuel Warren (minister) =

English Wesleyan Methodist minister

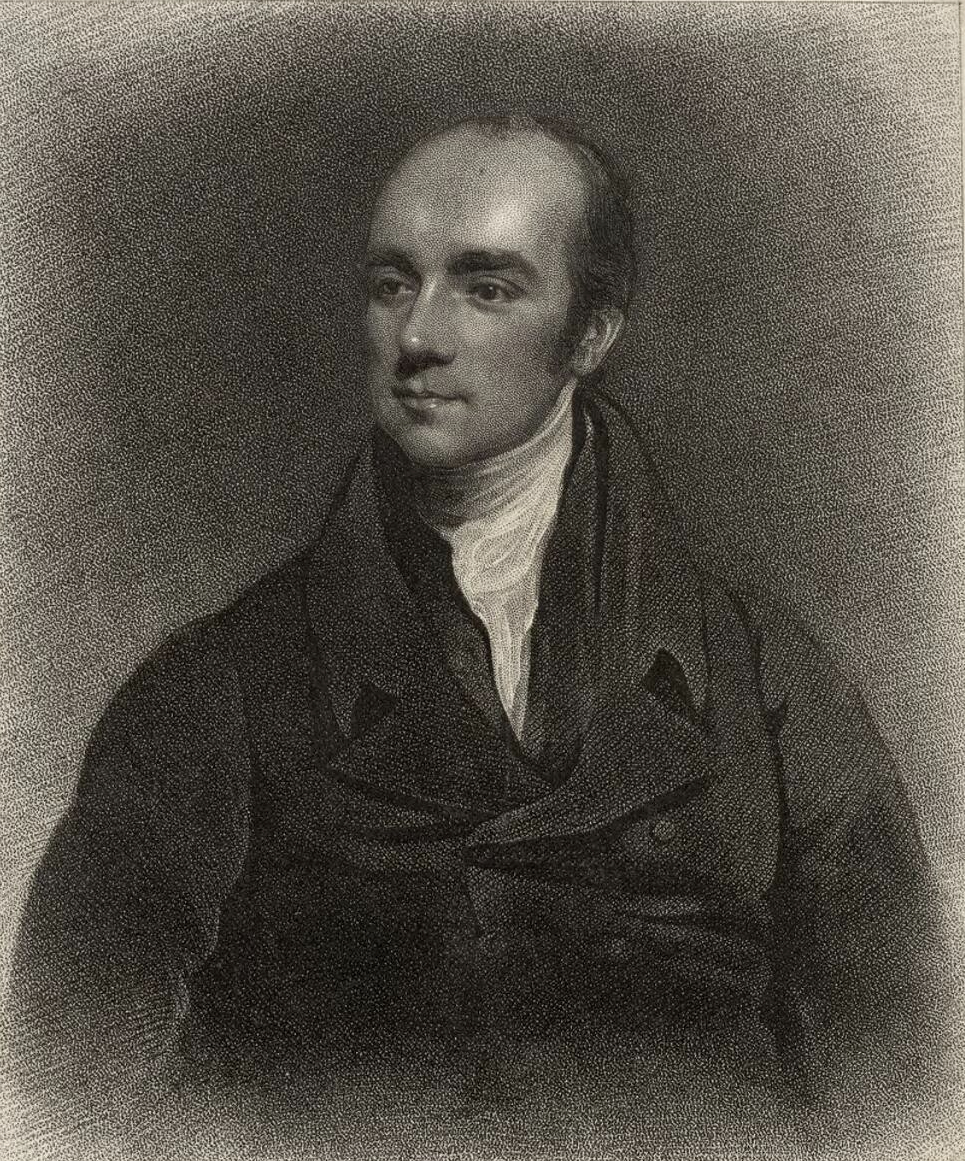
Engraving of Samuel Warren, c.1820

Samuel Warren (1781–1862) was a Wesleyan Methodist minister, who formed a breakaway group of "Warrenites", and in later life was an Anglican priest.

== Early life ==
He was the son of Samuel Warren, a sea captain of Great Yarmouth. He was an apprentice on his father's ship at the beginning of the French Revolutionary Wars, when it was captured in 1794 by the French. They spent 18 months in captivity.

Back in England, Warren went to study with a teacher of mathematics and navigation in Liverpool. There, in 1800, he became a convert to Wesleyan Methodism, and after two years a minister.

== Schismatic Methodist ==
The 1830s were a time of schism for the British Wesleyan Methodists, with "low Methodists" active in defence of traditional governance, against increasing centralised institutions. The breakaway group led out by Warren in 1835—the "Warrenites"—following the secession around Joseph Rayner Stephens the previous year, was the most significant disruption of the decade. It did not much affect the growth of the Wesleyans. At the 1834 annual Wesleyan conference, Warren contested the establishment of a Wesleyan Theological Institution, without success, and the growing influence of Jabez Bunting. Bunting had much more support in the conference than Warren's opposition group, but there were also a large number of ministers who remained neutral.

Bunting and his supporters "stood for a conservative policy based on a close alliance with propertied members of the laity, the Established Church and the government, against the feared republicanism of the people." Warren's challenge resulted in his suspension as a minister, after his conference speech was published. The content in the version printed as a pamphlet was the result of premeditated work of Warren in Leeds, with James Bromley, who stood friend to him at the later disciplinary hearing, Joseph Beaumont who was an adversary of Bunting, and James Everett. John Booth Sharpley attempted to mediate.

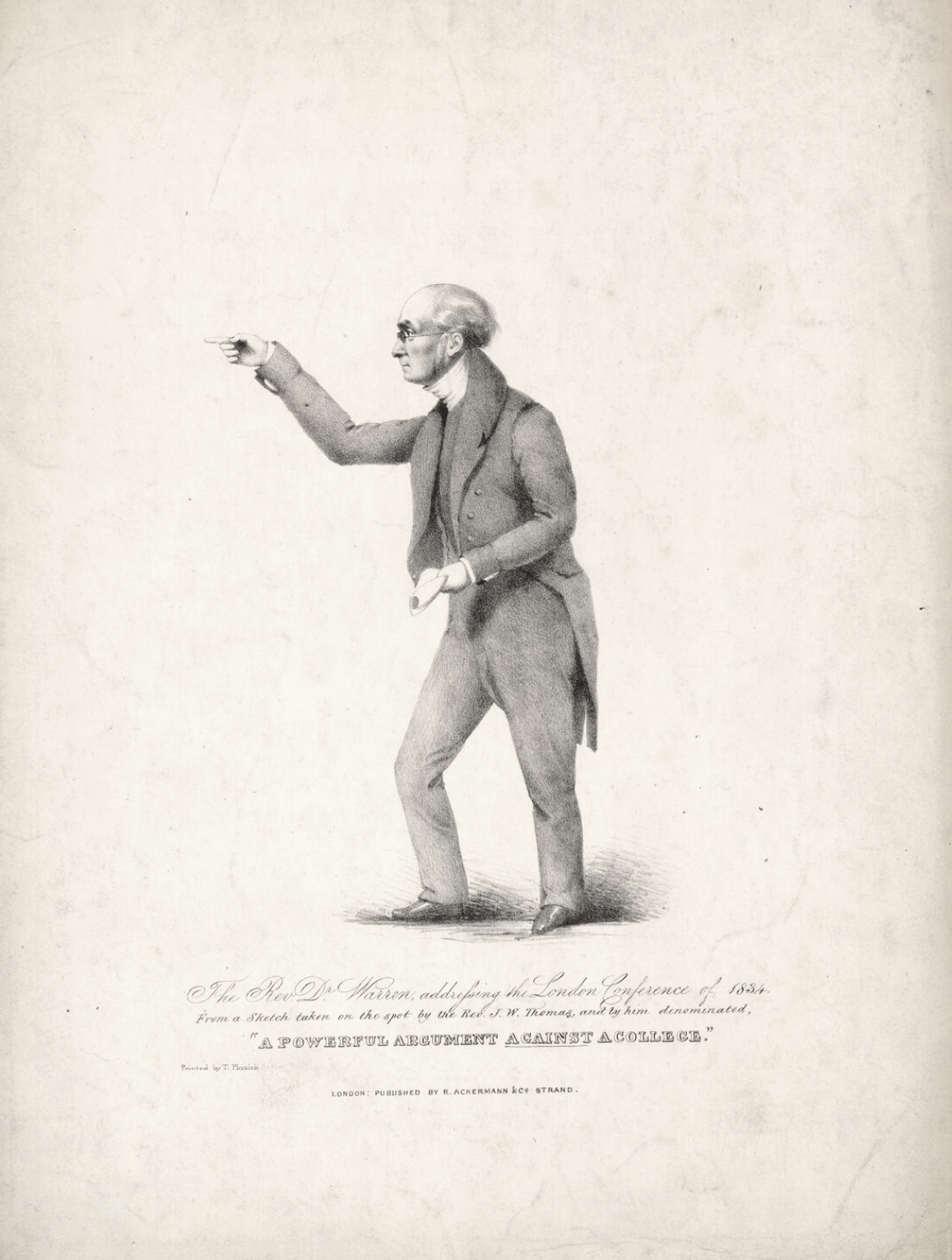
A Powerful Argument Against a Colleague, lithograph of Samuel Warren at the London Conference 1834, after John Wesley Thomas

The Warrenite Grand Central Association came into being during November 1834 in Manchester, where Warren was superintendent of the Oldham Street circuit of ministers. It unified a Manchester faction with a group of discontented Methodist laymen in Liverpool. At issue was local lay control of the Methodist ministry. A legal case brought by Warren went against him in March 1835. The "Warrenite secession" had a public demonstration in May or June, when Warren led a group of followers from the Wesleyan chapel in Blackley, where John Partis Haswell was preaching.

The opposition to the Wesleyan conference's authority was purged, and Warren was expelled from it in August of that year. He set up the alternative Wesleyan Association. The Protestant Methodists joined, in short order.

A Manchester guide of 1836 showed five Warrenite congregations. One of Warren's allies from the Theological Institution debate, Robert Eckett (1797–1862), took the Association forward (under the modified name Wesleyan Methodist Association). Thomas Pennock, a Wesleyan missionary in Jamaica who in the years immediately after the Slavery Abolition Act 1833 was driven into a dissident position by racially-based attitudes of Methodists there, brought his "Independent Methodists" into the Association in 1838. Pennock's opponent David Kerr that year drew a direct comparison between Warren and Pennock as schismatics.

Warren himself was the first president of the Association in 1836; he then met a rebuff in 1837 as the Association expanded its base, losing the presidency, being defeated by Eckett on restricting the composition of the annual assembly, and seeing his plan to merge into the Methodist New Connexion rejected. He soon left the Association. Of the Blackley group of followers, some returned to the Bunting Methodists, others joined the Church of England as Warren did, and yet others became Unitarians. The formation in the 1850s of the United Methodist Free Churches joined the Warrenites with the supporters of Rayner Stephens.

== Later life ==
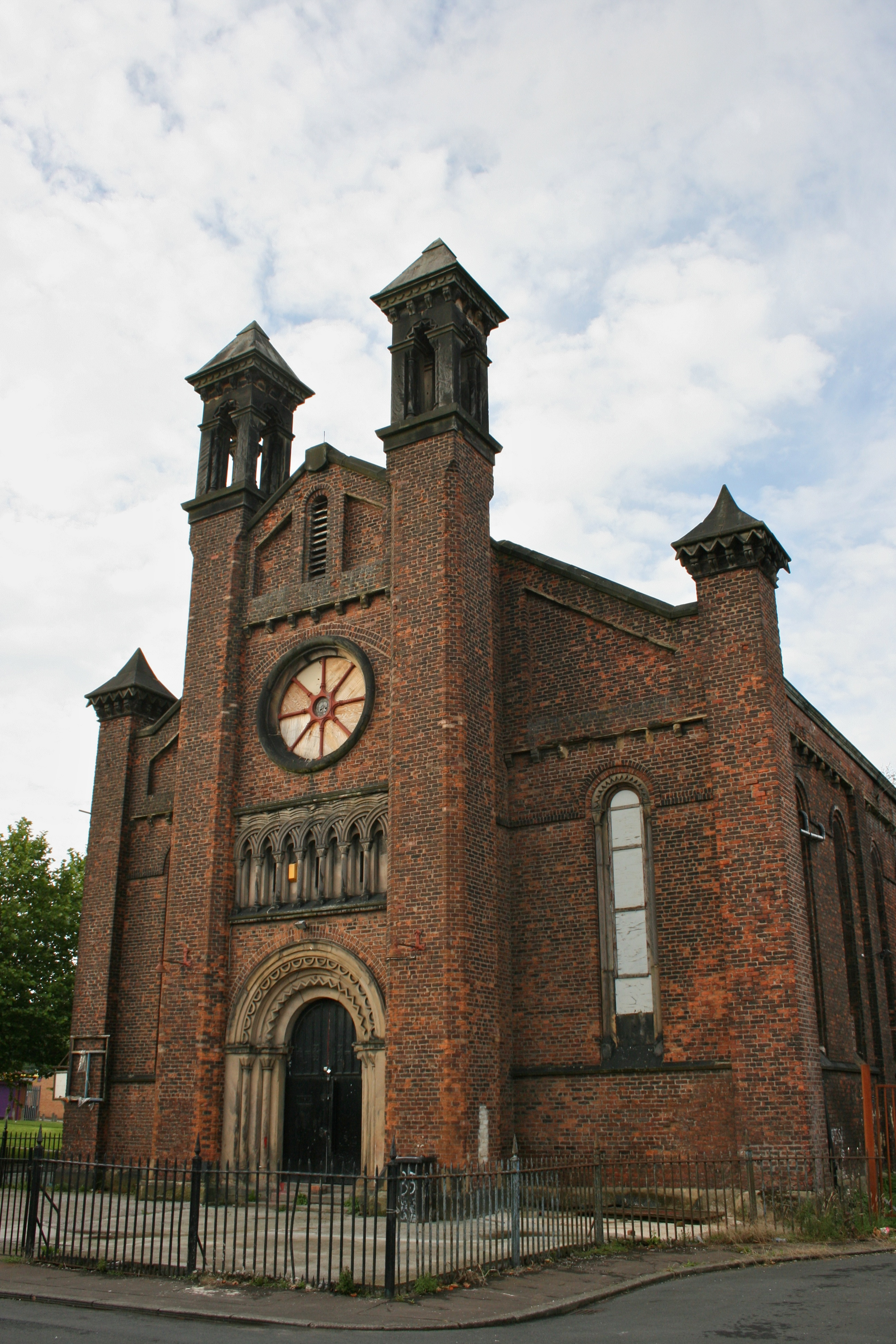
Church of All Souls, Manchester, 2009 photograph

Warren in 1838 was ordained in the Church of England. In 1840 he was given the cure of the new Church of All Souls, Manchester in Ancoats, where he remained for the rest of his life. The church was built for Warren; Sir Oswald Mosley, 2nd Baronet laid its foundation stone in 1839, giving both land, and some endowment.

== Family ==
In 1806 Warren married Anne Williams (1778–1823), of the Williams family of Gresford; John Williams (1705–1788) of Llay, an early Wesleyan in Chester, was her grandfather. Her father Richard Williams (1737–1816) settled at Rackery Farm (Racre) near Rossett in 1763, and married Elizabeth Gardner (1746–1824), sister of the Wesleyan preacher John Gardner. Samuel and Anne had six sons and a daughter, the eldest child being Samuel Warren the writer. In 1827 Warren published a collection of his wife's letters.
