= Church of All Souls, Manchester =

Former church in Manchester, England (1840–2026)

Church of All Souls
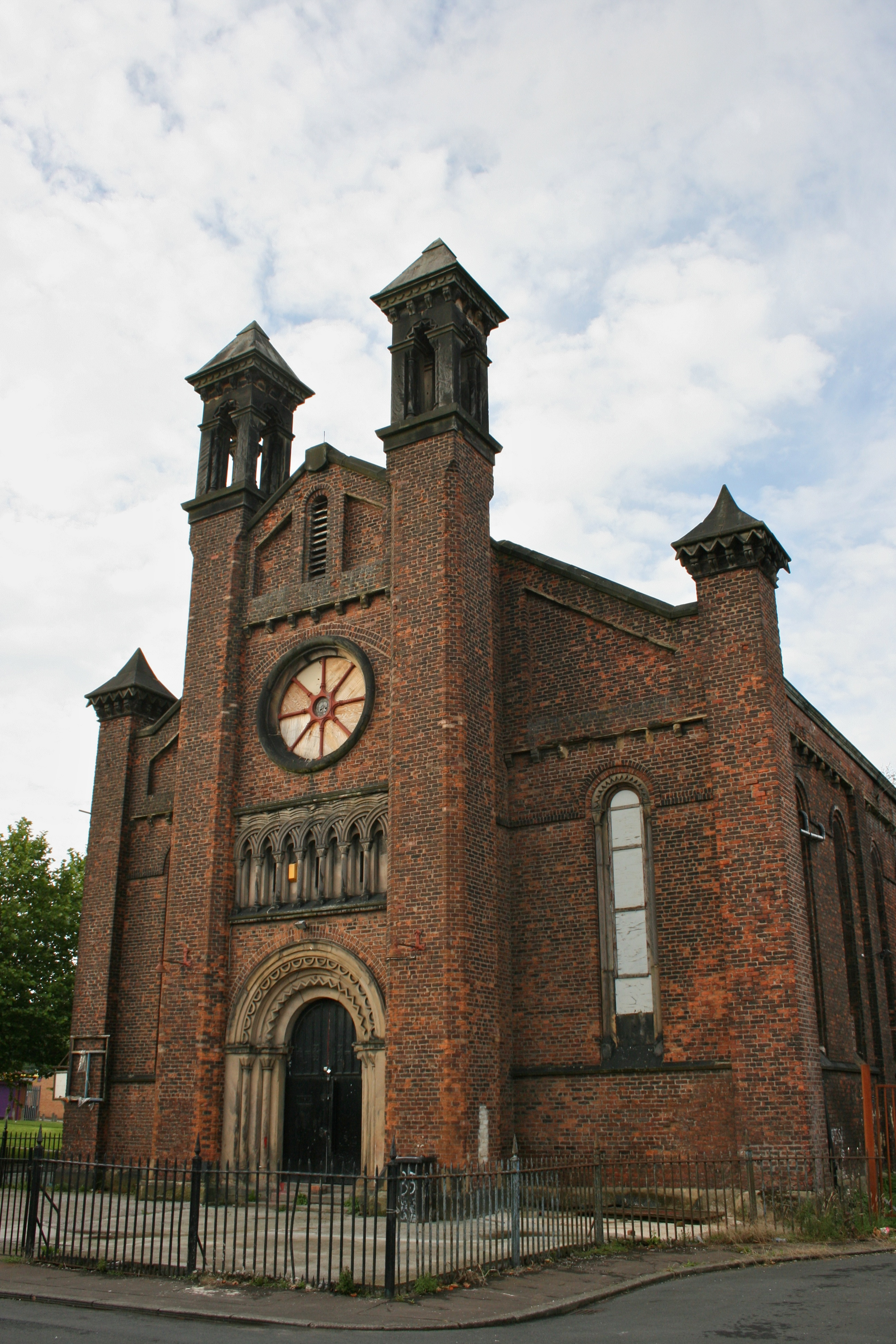
- The church in 2009
- Church of All Souls
- 53.4804°N 2.2156°W
- Location: Every Street, Ancoats, Manchester, England
- Denomination: Anglican

History
- Status: Demolished
- Founder: Rev Samuel Warren
- Consecrated: 18 November 1840

Architecture
- Heritage designation: Grade II
- Designated: 15 October 1984
- Architect: William Hayley
- Architectural type: Church
- Style: Romanesque Revival
- Groundbreaking: 1839
- Completed: 1840; 186 years ago
- Closed: 1984
- Demolished: 2026

Specifications
- Materials: Brown brick, stone, slate

The Church of All Souls was a Victorian former Anglican parish church on Every Street in Ancoats, an area of Manchester, England. Designed by William Hayley and built in 1839–40 in a Romanesque Revival style, it was commissioned by Samuel Warren and listed at Grade II in 1984. The church closed that year and later served as a joinery workshop before falling into disrepair. It was added to Save Britain's Heritage's Buildings at Risk register in 2023. After remaining derelict for years, a structural failure led to the building being demolished in October 2026.

== History ==
In the early 19th century, the Church Building Commission funded the construction of a large number of Church of England churches around England and Wales. In Manchester, many Commissioners' churches were established among the growing populations of the suburbs, rather than in the city centre. The Dewsbury-born architect William Hayley received commissions from this church building scheme, and this allowed him to establish his unique style, combining neo-Norman and Italianate architectural elements.

Rev Samuel Warren was a Methodist minister who had left his breakaway Wesleyan Association in 1838 to join the Church of England. In 1838 he was ordained as an Anglican priest, and a new church, All Souls in Ancoats, was built for him on land donated by Sir Oswald Mosley. Hayley was commissioned to design the church and it was constructed in 1839–40. Mosley laid the foundation stone on 26 October 1839, giving both land, and some endowment. All Souls was consecrated on 18 November 1840.

The building was designated a Grade II listed structure on 15 October 1984, the same year the church closed and was subsequently used as a joinery workshop. It had already fallen into disrepair by the early 21st century, and in 2023 it was added to Save Britain's Heritage's Buildings at Risk register. It was reported in December 2025 that the building had been put up for auction for £450,000 in December 2024, but no sale was agreed. It was also noted that the owner had carried out some limited roof‑edge protection work, although further repair requests from Manchester City Council had not been answered. At that time, the council was considering taking additional action. A stretch of Every Street, running from Great Ancoats Street towards the Etihad Stadium, was closed to traffic in August 2026 as a safety measure while a reported structural failure at the former church was investigated.

The council demolished the building in October 2026. Its destruction was criticised by Save Britain's Heritage, who called it "a shocking end for a building which has suffered years of deterioration and decay". Historic England expressed regret at the loss of "an important part of Manchester's historic environment".

== Architecture ==
Hayley designed All Souls' Church in a predominantly Romanesque Revival style. It has been described in Pevsner Architectural Guides as "idiosyncratic... an interesting curiosity".

The building was constructed in brown brick with some stone detailing and a slate roof. It followed a rectangular plan set on a south‑west to north‑east axis. Both the east and west ends had three gabled bays, with square corner features and similar features flanking the centre bay. These carried stone decorative elements and small pyramidal roofs; those at the centre of the west front rose into tall open belfry stages.

The centre of the west front had a stone entrance with carved detailing, a band of intricate blind arcading, a large circular window with eight openings, a stone band supported on small brackets, and a narrow louvred opening at the top of the gable. The outer bays each had a single tall lancet window with side shafts, patterned arches, brick hoodmoulds, and matching horizontal bands.

At the east end, the centre bay contained three stepped round‑headed lancets, a stone band like that on the west front, and a circular opening at the gable apex with bracketed support. The outer bays had round‑headed doorways with zig‑zag dog-tooth carving.

The long side walls were divided into four bays, marked by vertical strips and simple bracketed bands similar to those at the ends. Each bay contained two tall round‑headed lancet windows.

=== Interior ===
The interior, as recorded in 1984, had been arranged in five bays marked by cast‑iron columns with quatrefoil heads that supported a gallery. The gallery front was finished with interlaced blind arcading, and an organ loft stood at the west end above an enclosed bay.

The choir had later been raised to form a sanctuary, framed by a round‑headed arch with simple moulded outlines. Behind it was a stone reredos with a six‑bay arcade, set below tall lancet openings carried on stone shafts and finished with lobed arches on scalloped capitals. The roof had open arcading between its trusses.

The building retained its original box‑pews and the benches in the gallery, and it contained a stone pulpit dating from the late 19th century.

Architectural features

Corner turret with belfry

Neo-Norman west door with dog-tooth decoration

East end lancet windows

West end rose window

== See also ==
- Listed buildings in Manchester-M4
- List of Commissioners' churches in Northeast and Northwest England
