= Samuel Dunn (minister) =

British Methodist minister (1798–1882)

Samuel Dunn (13 February 1798 – 24 January 1882) was a British Methodist minister and religious writer.

== Life ==
Dunn was born at Mevagissey in Cornwall. His father, James Dunn, the master of a small trading vessel, made the acquaintance of John Wesley in 1768, and became a class leader; with his crew he protected Adam Clarke from the fury of a mob in Guernsey in 1786. He died at Mevagissey, 8 August 1842, aged 88.

The son Samuel received his education at Truro, under Edward Budd, who was afterwards the editor of The West Briton. In 1819, he was admitted a Wesleyan Methodist minister, and after passing the usual three years of probation, was received as a full minister, and volunteered for service in the Shetland Islands, where, in conjunction with John Raby, he was the first minister of his denomination, and suffered many hardships. While here he wrote an interesting series of articles descriptive of Orkney and Shetland (Wesleyan Methodist Magazine, 1822–5).

Dunn was afterwards stationed at Newcastle, Rochdale, Manchester, Sheffield, Tadcaster, Edinburgh, Camborne, Dudley, Halifax, and Nottingham successively, and at all these places proved a most acceptable preacher.

== Written work ==
His first work, entitled Subjects and Modes of Baptism, was printed at Pembroke in 1821; thenceforward, his pen was never idle. Upwards of seventy books have his name on their title-pages, a full account of which is given in Boase and Courtney's Bibliotheca Cornubiensis, i. 124–7, iii. 1163. Dunn wrote against atheism, popery, Socinianism and unitarianism, and in defence of Methodism. His best-known works are A Dictionary of the Gospels, with maps, tables, and lessons, published in 1846, which went to a fourth edition in the same year, and Memoirs of seventy-five eminent Divines whose Discourses form the Morning Exercises at Cripplegate, St. Giles-in-the-Fields, and Southwark, which appeared in 1844. He was also a contributor to theological magazines and reviews.

== Fly Sheets ==
Until 1847, Dunn continued in harmony with the Wesleyan Methodists, but he was accused of having been involved with James Everett and the Rev. William Griffith, Jun. in the Fly Sheets. These pamphlets advocated reforms in the Wesleyan governing body. They also reflected on the proceedings of the conference and its committees in unmeasured terms, and complained of the personal ambition of Jabez Bunting and Robert Newton, two of the past presidents of the Methodist Conference. What part the three ministers had taken, if any, in the Fly Sheets has not been discovered.

In 1849, Dunn started publishing a monthly magazine called the Wesley Banner and Revival Record, which, following the example set by the Fly Sheets, criticised the governance of Methodism and suggested reforms. At the conference held at Manchester in 1849 the three ministers were asked to discontinue the Wesley Banner, and to give up attacking Methodism. They, however, refused to make any promises; and were expelled from the Wesleyan Methodist Church on 25 July. Meetings of sympathy with them were held, with one in Exeter Hall, London, on 31 August 1849. These expulsions were damaging to the Wesleyan Methodist connexion: between 1850 and 1855, more than 100,000 members joined the Methodist Reformers, and it was not until 1855 that the Wesleyan Methodist Church began to recover from this disruption. In a short time 20,000 copies were sold of a small pamphlet entitled Remarks on the Expulsion of the Messrs. Everett, Dunn, and Griffith by William Horton.

== Later years ==
Dunn then led a quiet life; for some time he itinerated and preached in the pulpits of various denominations. From 1855 to 1864, he lived at Camborne in Cornwall, where he ministered to the Free Church Methodists. Having written numerous articles in many American publications, he was in course of time conferred a D.D. degree by one of the United States universities, and after that event called himself minister of the Methodist Episcopal Church of America.

He died at 2 St James's Road, Hastings, 24 January 1882.
