= Alexander Humphrys-Alexander =

Alexander Humphrys-Alexander (1783–4 May 1859) was a claimant to the vacant Earldom of Stirling and rights to vast lands in eastern Canada, referring back to a Royal Charter granted to the 1st Earl by James I in 1621 to colonize Nova Scotia and surrounding areas of North America.

== Early life ==
Born Alexander Humphrys in 1783, he was the son of William Humphrys, a Birmingham merchant, and his wife Hannah Alexander. In 1802 he accompanied his father to France and was arrested on the orders of Napoleon the following year. They were detained in Verdun. His father died and he returned to England in 1815. At some point he met Thomas Christopher Banks, genealogist and author of a book on the Extinct and Dormant Baronage of England, who became his adviser.

== The claim ==
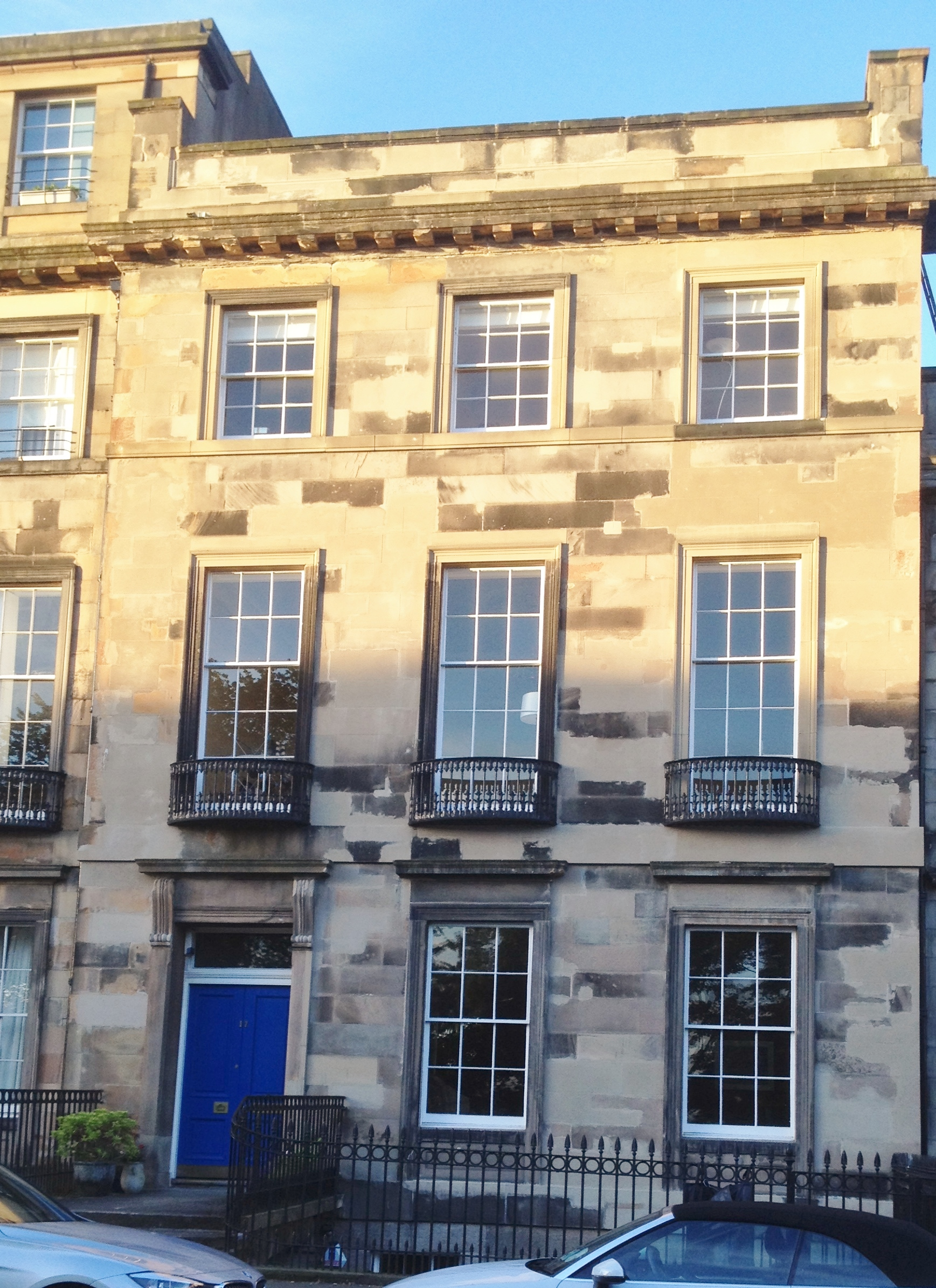
Humphrys-Alexander lived at 17 Carlton Terrace, Edinburgh in 1838-39

The (then) Alexander Humphrys applied for a royal licence to take the surname Alexander in honour of his maternal grandfather, John Alexander. This was granted in 1824. Following that, he had himself declared the lawful heir of his mother by magistrates in Edinburgh in 1826. He then proceeded to claim the earldom as the descendant and heir of William Alexander, 1st Earl of Stirling (c. 1567–1640) on 11 October 1830, styling himself ‘Earl of Stirling and Dovan’.

He then moved to claim the Canadian titles and property. These were originally restricted to the direct male line, but Humphrys-Alexander cited a special charter (or ‘Novodamus’) that Charles I had granted in 1639 which obviated this requirement. He was unable to prove the existence of this charter but nevertheless in June 1831, he successfully claimed his Canadian 'property' through the Sheriff of Edinburgh, and was 'invested' with them at Edinburgh Castle on 8 July 1831. He then proceeded to give Banks 16,000 acres of land in Canada and made him a baronet, followed by other attempts to make profitable use of his American interests.

== Trial for forgery ==
The ambitious scope of Humphrys-Alexander's activities inevitably involved the British government and eventually his claims were challenged, culminating in a celebrated trial in Edinburgh in 1839 in which he was accused of forgery. Eventually at least two of 17 documents were declared to be forgeries, however Humphrys-Alexander himself was acquitted of personal responsibility for making them, after which he left the country to live in Brussels, Paris and eventually America. He died in Washington on 4 May 1859.

== See also ==
- William Alexander, Lord Stirling
