= Baron of Menstrie =

Title in the baronage of Scotland

The Baron of Menstrie (Baron of Menstry) was a title in the baronage of Scotland.

== List of barons of Menstrie ==
- Thomas MacAlexander
- Alexander MacAlexander
- Andrew MacAlexander
- Alexander Alexander
- Sir William Alexander
