= WRU =

WRU may refer to:

- Welsh Rugby Union, a sporting body in Wales
- Waikato Rugby Union, a sporting body in New Zealand
- Wesleyan Reform Union, a British Methodist church
- Western Reserve University, Ohio, United States
- West Ruislip station, Greater London, England (GBR:WRU)
