= Thomas Christopher Banks =

Thomas Christopher Banks (1765–1854), who for a while styled himself by the bogus title "Sir T.C. Banks, Baronet of Nova Scotia", was a British genealogist and lawyer. He is notorious for having assisted several claimants to dormant peerages, based on the very flimsiest evidence, which he strengthened with imaginary pedigrees. During his later years, he resided near Ripon, Yorkshire.

== Origins ==
Banks claimed connection through his father with the ancient family of Banks of Whitley in Yorkshire, whose descent he traced from Richard Bankes, a Baron of the Exchequer in the time of Henry IV and Henry V; and he asserted that his maternal ancestors were the Nortons of Barbados, baronets of Nova Scotia.

== Adopts bogus baronetcy ==
Banks styled himself "Sir T.C. Banks, Baronet of Nova Scotia", as his name appears on the title pages of several of his works. This was on the basis of a so-called baronetcy purportedly granted to him by a certain Alexander Humphrys, who supported by Banks, laid claim to the dormant Earldom of Stirling on the basis of forged documents. When the documents on which Humphrys founded his claims were discovered to be forgeries, Banks ceased to make use of the bogus baronetcy; however, in his obituary notice he is nevertheless styled a Baronet of Nova Scotia and Knight of the Holy Order of St. John of Jerusalem.

== Career ==
Banks was educated in the law and offered his services as an agent in cases of disputed inheritance. From 1813 to 1820 he practised at 5 Lyon's Inn, and subsequently ran the Dormant Peerage Office, in John Street, Pall Mall, London. He strengthened flimsy claims with imaginary pedigrees; some of his published works, however, contained accurate research.

The Manual of the Nobility, his first publication, appeared in 1807. The same year he brought out the first volume of the Dormant and Extinct Baronage of England, a second volume following in 1808, and a third in 1809. In 1812 he published the first volume of a corresponding work on the Peerage, nearly one-half of the volume being occupied with an account of the royal families of England down to the death of Queen Anne, and the remainder by the peerage from Abergavenny to Banbury; but the work was never carried beyond this volume.

The same year (1812) he edited, in one volume, reprints of William Dugdale's Ancient Usage in bearing Arms, Dugdale's Discourse touching the Office of Lord High Chancellor, with additions, together with Simon Segar's Honores Anglicani. The first of his pamphlets in support of spurious claims to peerages appeared also in the same year under the title An Analysis of the Genealogical History of the Family of Howard with its Connections; showing the legal course of descent of those numerous titles which are generally, but presumed erroneously, attributed to be vested in the dukedom of Norfolk. In 1815 the pamphlet was republished with the more sensational title, Ecce Homo, the Mysterious Heir: or Who is Mr. Walter Howard? an interesting inquiry addressed to the Duke of Norfolk. A third edition appeared in 1816, with a copy of Walter Howard's petition to the king. The same year there was published anonymously the Detection of Infamy, earnestly recommended to the justice and deliberation of the Imperial Parliament by an Unfortunate Nobleman. The author of the pamphlet, as attested by his own hand in the British Museum copy, was Mr. Banks; the unfortunate nobleman was Thomas Drummond, of Biddick, who, as a descendant of the junior branch of the Drummonds, claimed to succeed to the estates in preference to James Drummond, who had been recognised as heir in 1784, and was created Lord Perth in 1797.

== Supports Dymoke claim as Royal Champion ==
In the 1810s Banks was also engaged in compiling the cases printed by Lewis Dymoke on his claim to the barony of Marmion in right of the tenure of the manor of Scrivelsby, Lincoln. In 1814 Banks published an Historical and Critical Enquiry into the Nature of the Kingly Office, the Coronation, and Office of King's Champion; and in 1816 a History of the Ancient Noble Family of Marmyun, their singular Office of King's Champion.

== Publishes Stemmata Anglicana (1825) ==
In 1825 he brought out Stemmata Anglicana; or, a Miscellaneous Collection of Genealogy, showing the descent of numerous ancient and baronial families, to which is added an analysis of the law of hereditary dignities, embracing the origin of nobility. The second part contained an account of the ancient and extinct royal families of England, re-embodied from the Extinct Peerage. In 1887 this was republished as a fourth volume of the Dormant and Extinct Baronage of England, and continued down to January 1837, with corrections, appendices, and index.

== Supports Humphrys' claim to Earldom of Stirling ==
In 1830 he undertook the case of Alexander Humphrys, or Alexander, who laid claim to the earldom of Stirling, as descended from a younger branch of the family by the female side; his mother, who died in 1814, assuming to be Countess of Stirling in her own right. In support of the claims of Humphrys there appeared in 1830 Letters to the Right Hon. the Lord K—on the Right of Succession to Scottish Peerages, which reached a second edition. The letters were by Mr. E. Lockhart; the advertisement, pp. 1–8, and the appendix, pp. 43–118, by Banks. The same year Banks published on the subject a Letter to the Earl of Roseberry in relation to the proceedings at the late election of Scotch peers, and this was followed in 1831 by an Address to the Peers of Scotland by Alexander, Earl of Stirling and Dovan, and in 1832 by an Analytical Statement of the Case of Alexander, Earl of Stirling and Dovan. Banks gave proof of his own personal faith in the claims of Humphrys by allowing the pseudo-earl, in accordance with rights conferred on the first Earl of Stirling by King James VI of Scotland, to create him a baronet, and by accepting from him, in anticipation, a grant of 6,000 acres of land in Nova Scotia. When the documents on which Humphrys founded his claims were discovered to be forgeries, Banks ceased to make use of his own title; but in his obituary notice he is styled a Baronet of Nova Scotia and Knight of the Holy Order of St. John of Jerusalem.

== Earldom of Salisbury ==
While the Stirling case was still in progress. Banks published the imaginary discovery of another unrecognised claim to a peerage, under the title of a Genealogical and Historical Account of the Earldom of Salisbury, showing the descent of the Baron Audley of Heleigh from the William Longespe, Earl of Sabsbury, son of King Henry II by the celebrated Fair Rosamond, and showing also the right of the Baron Audley to the inheritance of the same earldom.

== Other publications ==
- Baronia Anglica Concentrata; or Baronies in Fee London, 1844,
- Observations on the Jus et Modus Decimandi, an Account of the ancient Chapel of St. Stephen's at Westminster, n/d.
- Poem on the Family of Bruce

== Death ==
He died at Greenwich 30 September 1854.
