= Evelyn Everett-Green =

English novelist (1856–1932)

- Born: Evelyn Ward Everett-Green; 17 November 1856; London, England
- Died: 23 April 1932 (aged 75); Funchal, Madeira, Portugal
- Occupation: Writer (novelist)
- Writing career
- Pen name: H. F. E., Cecil Adair, E. Ward, Evelyn Dare
- Period: 19th century
- Genres: Children's Literature, Historical fiction, Adult romance fiction

Evelyn Ward Everett-Green (17 November 1856 in London – 23 April 1932 in Funchal) was an English novelist who started with improving, pious stories for children, moved on to historical fiction for older girls, and then turned to adult romantic fiction. She wrote about 350 books, more than 200 of them under her own name, and others using the pseudonyms H. F. E., Cecil Adair, E. Ward and Evelyn Dare.

== Early life and work ==
Evelyn was born at 7 Upper Gower Street, London. Her mother was a historian, Mary Anne Everett Green (née Wood), and her father, George Pycock Green, a portrait and landscape painter. The family were Methodists. She was the second of the family's three surviving daughters and had an older brother. She was baptised at Great Queen Street Wesleyan Methodist Chapel on 22 February 1857 as Eveline, but changed her name to Evelyn in later life. Like the rest of her family, she added Everett to her surname in honour of George Green's friend the Wesleyan historian James Everett.

From earliest childhood, Evelyn invented stories to tell her sisters. She was educated at home until the age of 12, then at Gower Street Preparatory School, where she wrote a historical tale about Lady Jane Grey. Next came a year at Bedford College, London on a Reid scholarship (1872–1873), during which she wrote Tom's Tempest Victory, her first novel. She continued to write while studying at the London Academy of Music. She also worked as a nurse in a London hospital for two years. Her brother's death in 1876 ended plans to go to India with him. She occupied herself with good works, including Sunday School teaching and nursing, and later hospital nursing.

== Writing career ==
In 1880 Tom Tempest's Victory became her first published work, under the pseudonym H. F. E. Though it was soon followed by other works, she found writing at home difficult and town winters unhealthy for her. In 1881 she was still living in Gower Street with her family, but in 1883 she moved outside London with Catherine Mainwaring Sladen. In the 1890s and early 1900s they had homes in Albury, Surrey. At the time of the 1891 England Census, however, she and Catherine were currently visiting her family at Gower Street.

While in Albury, Everett-Green wrote numerous historical novels and somewhat fewer moral tales for the Religious Tract Society. Her novel about Joan of Arc entitled Called of Her Country (1903), later republished as A Heroine of France, presents Joan as a feminine "Angelic Maid" in white armour, whose inspiring adventures were undertaken in a dutiful spirit. Many of her works have been dismissed by critics as apologies for an oppressive order. The girls' historical romance genre is viewed by such critics as a validation of "traditional", restrictive, domestic-oriented versions of femininity by showing they had long-established historical precedents.

Much of Everett-Green's fiction and non-fiction was meant for girls, but she also wrote boys' adventure stories such as A Gordon Highlander (1901). Many of her books followed values and themes learnt during her Methodist upbringing. These are clearest in her books targeting children in general. She soon turned to novels for slightly older girls, the genre she is best remembered for. They generally followed development in a household from childhood to adulthood. Careers for women were mentioned without disapproval, but the endings invariably featured marriage for the female heroines. Contemporary critics, such as one from the Chicago Daily Tribune, said the works were written with "obvious good intention", but the "day of the weepy, fainting, blue-eyed... heroine has vanished." Between 1890 and 1909 she wrote about 50 historical tales before moving to Madeira.

Thereafter she wrote romantic novels for adults, often under the pseudonym Cecil Adair. According to a modern critic, "Family sagas or romances with a historical adventure setting were her speciality." Contemporary readers enjoyed these for their chaste sensationalism and they had considerable success. She occasionally collaborated with fellow authors Louisa Bedford and Emma and Beatrice Marshall.

Evelyn's works were some of the most popular of her generation. She was one of the bestselling authors with her publisher, Stanley Paul. However, while popular enough to bring in adequate income, they lack real distinction and are now generally read for the light they shed on social backgrounds.

== Later life and death ==
In the 1911 census, Everett-Green, with several servants, is recorded as still living at Albury with Catherine, as "joint heads" of the household. In that year, however, Evelyn and Catherine moved abroad and eventually settled in Quinta Pico de São João, Madeira. However, during the First World War they both lived at Battramsley near Lymington, Hampshire. She and Catherine remained there, financially independent and unmarried. Dominic James has suggested their partnership may have been a romantic one, in line with the same-sex relationship Everett-Green outlined in Fast friends; or, David and Jonathan (1882), which was published under a pseudonym.

Evelyn returned to England each year to visit her sister Gertrude and do business with her publishers. She became an active member of the Anglican community in Madeira and was buried in the British Cemetery. There is a memorial plaque on the interior south wall of the English Holy Trinity Church, Funchal. She left a fortune of £5,657. 9s 3d, with the classical scholar A. S. F. Gow administering her will.

== Later reception ==
An extract from The Mistress of Lydgate Priory (1885): "For a time I was afraid of her, with that fear that is not unwholesome in the young and has a fascination of its own. I liked to see her come into my room, and was sorry when she left. I liked to watch her from my window as she paced in her stately way to and fro upon the terrace.... My grandmother was herself a reserved and silent woman; moreover, she was imbued with a sound and practical common sense that I have never seen equalled, and which gave her a power and discernment rarely to be met with. Every one came to her for advice, as it seemed to me; and seldom did they go away without having received just such counsel as they most needed. The confidence she inspired was something marvellous, as was the deep and true veneration with which all regarded her."

The figure represented in this extract exemplifies the recurring theme of a stern and authoritative matriarch seen in the eyes of an adoring and respectful young woman. This theme has led critics to accuse Everett-Green of apologizing for an oppressive order. Indeed her status as a writer for the juvenile female market has led to her works being lumped together as conservative and reactionary by critics such as Kimberley Reynolds. This reading of them became problematic in the 20th century. The idea of girls' literature enforcing traditional forms of femininity comes from later commentators such as E. J. Salmon. This has led to a perception that all literature of this kind was reactionary and conservative.

Hillary Skelding has argued that Everett-Green's historical works maintain a high degree of historical accuracy, due to her mother's background as a historian and other female historians of the era. Some of her narratives focus on the unexceptional, everyday women of history who often acknowledge such domestic authority. She depicts in her fictional mothers and wives greater shrewdness and cleverness than her male counterparts did. Conversely, Kimberley Reynolds has noted that some such characters are powerful only within the domestic sphere and do not change the conventional patriarchal order. In effect, she only offers the illusion of female empowerment by limiting it to the domestic sphere.

== Selected works ==
- The Doctor's Dozen (1880)
- Fast friends; or, David and Jonathan (1882) (as H. F. E.)
- Curthbert Conningsby (1884)
- Torwood's Trust (1884)
- The cottage and the grange (1885)
- Her Husband's Home; or The Durleys of Linley Castle (1885)
- Little Lady Clare (1888)
- Vera's Trust (1888)
- Monica (1889)
- The Secret of the Old House. A Story for Children (1890)
- Mrs. Romaine's Household (1891)
- The Lord of Dynevor: A Tale of the Times of Edward the First (1892)
- Friends or Foes: A Story for Boys and Girls (1893)
- In the Days of Chivalry: A Tale of the Times of the Black Prince (1893)
- The Church and the King, a tale of England in the days of Henry VIII (1893)
- Maud Melville's marriage: a story of the seventeenth century (1893)
- St. Dunstan's Clock: A Story of 1666 (1893)
- Sir Aylmer's Heir; a Story for the Young (1894)
- The Secret Chamber at Chad (1894)
- The Lost Treasure of Trevlyn: A Story of the Days of the Gunpowder Plot (1894)
- Shut in: a Tale of the wonderful Siege of Antwerp in the year 1585 (1895)
- His Choice and Hers (1895) with H. Louisa Bedford.
- Judith: The Money-lender's Daughter (1896)
- In Taunton town a story of the rebellion of James Duke of Monmouth in 1685 (1896)
- Enid's Ugly Duckling (1896) with H. Louisa Bedford.
- Olive Roscoe, or, The new sister (1896)
- Squib and His Friends (1897)
- Molly Melville: A tale for girls (1897)
- Tom Tufton's Travels (1898)
- A Clerk of Oxford, and His Adventures in the Baron's War (1898)
- Sister. A Chronicle of Fair Haven (1898)
- French and English: A Story of the Struggle in America (1899)
- Shimmering Waters (1900) (as Cecil Adair)
- Priscilla: A Story for Girls (1900) with H. Louisa Bedford.
- Barbara's Brothers (1900)
- The Heir of Hascombe hall; a tale of the days of the early Tudors (1900)
- Esther's Charge: a story for girls (1900)
- Eustace Marchmont: a Friend of the People (1900)
- Miss Uraca (1900)
- Our Winnie and The Little Match-Girl (1900)
- Under the Village Elms: Stories of the Beatitudes (1900)
- In Cloister and Court; or, The White Flower of a Blameless Life. The Story of Bishop Ken (London: John F. Shaw and Co., c. 1900)
- In the Wars of the Roses: A Story for the Young (1901)
- True Stories of Girl Heroines (1901)
- In the Days of Chivalry; a tale of the Times of the Black Prince (1901)
- In Fair Granada: a Tale of Moors and Christians (1902)
- Gabriel Garth, Chartist (1902)
- The Niece of Esther Lynne (1903)
- A hero of the Highlands: or, The romance of a rebellion, as related by one who looked on (1903)
- Ringed by Fire: a story of the Franco-Prussian War (1904)
- The Castle of the White Flag: a tale of the Franco-German War (1904)
- The Secret of Wold Hall (1905)
- Fallen Fortunes (1906)
- A Heroine of France: The Story of Joan of Arc (1906)
- Little Lady Val; a tale of the Days of Good Queen Bess (1906)
- For the Faith: A Story of the Young Pioneers of Reformation in Oxford
- Miss Meyrick's Niece (1910)
- The Qualities of Mercy (1911) (as Cecil Adair)
- Mr. Hatherley's Boys (before 1923)
- Queen's Manor School (1923)
- Francesca (1927) (as Cecil Adair)
- The Sign of the Red Cross (before 1911)

== Sources ==
- Oxford Companion to Edwardian Fiction 1900–1914: New Voices in the Age of Uncertainty, ed. Kemp, Mitchell, Trotter (OUP, 1997)
- Hilary Clare, Oxford Dictionary of National Biography
- Penny Brown, "Reinventing the Maid: images of Joan of Arc in French and English children's literature", The Presence of the Past in Children's Literature ed. Ann Lawson Lucas (Praeger, 2003)
