= Wesleyan Reform Union =

Independent group of Methodists in the United Kingdom

The Wesleyan Reform Union is an independent Methodist Connexion founded in 1859 and based in the United Kingdom. The Union comprises around one hundred individual self-governing churches in England and Scotland. Beliefs are set out in a nine-point Confession of Faith.

== History ==
The Wesleyan Reform Union was founded in 1859 by members of the Wesleyan Reform movement. The leaders of the Wesleyan Reformers had been expelled from the Wesleyan Methodist Church at its Manchester Conference in 1849. The expelled ministers and first leaders of the Wesleyan Reformers were James Everett, William Griffith and Samuel Dunn. In 1857, the major part of the Wesleyan Reformers joined other Methodist groups to form the United Methodist Free Churches but a minority joined together to establish the Wesleyan Reform Union two years later.

Wesleyan Reform Union communicants were reported to number 8,147 by 1876. Membership statistics from 1903 show the Union had 17 ministers, 193 churches, 7,858 members and 20,953 pupils. A proposal to unite with the Methodist Church was overwhelmingly rejected at the 1936 conference.

== Confession of Faith ==
The Wesleyan Reform Union Confession of Faith was accepted at a conference in 1970, and later modified by conference of 2008:

- That there is one true and living God, eternally existing in three Persons: Father, Son and Holy Spirit: maker of heaven and earth; Him alone we worship and adore.
- That the Holy Scriptures, both Old and New Testaments, as originally given, are of divine inspiration and infallible, supreme in authority in all matters of faith and conduct.
- That all have sinned and come short of the glory of God, and are thereby subject to God's wrath and condemnation.
- That God so loved the world that He gave His only begotten Son, Who was conceived by the Holy Spirit, born of the virgin Mary, and that He is truly God and truly Man, Jesus Christ our Lord.
- That the Lord Jesus Christ offered Himself as the substitutionary sacrifice for the sin of the whole world, He was raised from the dead, ascended into heaven to be our Advocate and Mediator, and that He will personally return in power and glory.
- That the Holy Spirit is a divine Person both equal to and of one substance with the Father and the Son, that His work is necessary to make the death of Christ effective to the individual sinner, granting him repentance toward God and faith in Jesus Christ, and that He also in dwells every believer as his Sanctifier, thus placing His seal upon him as a child of God.
- That the Lord Jesus Christ is the Head of the Church.
- In the Priesthood of all believers, and that we being members one of another, are one body in Christ Jesus, having equality of spiritual opportunities as the sacred right of all.
- That the Sacraments are an outward and visible sign of an inward and spiritual grace, and that only Baptism and the Lord's Supper were instituted by the Lord Jesus Christ as such, maintaining that the proper subjects for Baptism are believers and children to be brought up within the fellowship of Christ's Church.

== Structure ==
The head of the Wesleyan Reform Union is the Union President, who presides over the General Committee. The General Committee consists of up to 20 elected members plus representatives from various Union committees. There is also a President Designate. People are elected to each of these positions annually by delegates to a Conference. The General Secretary takes care of business matters.

At the local level, churches follow one of two schemes. A church may elect a President and a Vice President, or it may elect a Leadership Group. These positions are generally voted on annually. In the case of a Leadership Group, a Minister may also be elected. The Union maintains a list of approved ministers although churches are at liberty to appoint others not on the list. Some churches have had women pastors for a number of years and in 2016 the Union ordained and received a female minister onto its approved list for the first time. The position of Trustees may be implemented as well.

Wesleyan Reform Union churches are self-governing, this being the principal point of difference with the Methodist Church. Local leadership has final authority in local matters. Many churches are organized into Circuits which have four Quarterly Meetings each year.

The WRU's headquarters are in Jump, Barnsley, and it has around 100 congregations across Yorkshire, the Midlands, Buckinghamshire, Oxfordshire, Cornwall, and Scotland.
