= Earl of Stirling =

Earldom in the Peerage of Scotland

Earldom of Stirling Held with Earldom of Dovan
- Blazon Arms: Quarterly, 1st & 4th: Per pale argent and sable a chevron and a crescent in base counterchanged (Alexander of Menstrie); 2nd & 3rd: Or, a lymphad sable between three crosses crosslet bottony fitchée gules 2 and 1 (Stirling). In the point of honour, an escutcheon argent, a cross saltire azure charged with an escutcheon of the arms of Scotland (Nova Scotia)
- Creation date: 14 June 1633
- Created by: Charles I of England
- Peerage: Peerage of Scotland
- First holder: William Alexander, 1st Earl of Stirling
- Last holder: Henry Alexander, 5th Earl of Stirling
- Subsidiary titles: Viscount of Canada; Lord Alexander of Tullibody; Baronet Alexander of Menstrie
- Status: Dormant
- Extinction date: 1739
- Seat: Menstrie Castle

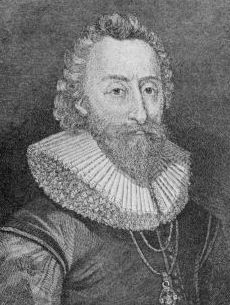
William Alexander, 1st Earl of Stirling

Earl of Stirling was a title in the Peerage of Scotland. It was created on 14 June 1633 for William Alexander, 1st Viscount of Stirling. He had already been created a Baronet, of Menstrie, Clackmannanshire in the Baronetage of Nova Scotia on 12 July 1625, then Lord Alexander of Tullibody and Viscount of Stirling on 4 September 1630, then Earl of Dovan in 1639. He was made Viscount of Canada at the same time that he was granted the earldom of Stirling. The other peerage titles were also in the Peerage of Scotland. The titles became dormant upon the death of the fifth Earl in 1739.

== Earls of Stirling (1633) ==
- William Alexander, 1st Earl of Stirling (1576–1640)
- William Alexander, 2nd Earl of Stirling (d. 1640)
- Henry Alexander, 3rd Earl of Stirling (d. 1644)
- Henry Alexander, 4th Earl of Stirling (d. 1691)
- Henry Alexander, 5th Earl of Stirling (1664–1739)

== Later claimants ==
=== William Alexander ===
William Alexander, a military officer from New Jersey who was a major-general in the Continental Army during the American War of Independence, pursued a claim to succeed to the dormant earldom from 1756 to 1759. The claim from senior male descent from the first Earl's grandfather was ultimately turned down by the House of Lords in 1762, although he was allowed to vote in the election of the Scottish representative peers.

=== Alexander Humphrys-Alexander ===
In the 19th century, there was an attempt to assert that there was a new grant of the title of Earl of Dovan connected with the title of Earl of Stirling, and a new destination of descent for the title of Earl of Stirling, with the title claimed by Alexander Humphrys-Alexander (1783–1859). Mary Hill, Marchioness of Downshire brought a petition before the House of Lords in 1832, claiming that she would be the rightful heir as the descendant of Judith Alexander, sister of Henry Fifth Earl of Stirling. A court case filed in 1839 ruled that at least two of the seventeen documents in support of the case were forgeries; Humphrys-Alexander himself was acquitted of personal responsibility for making them.

The case and the associated forgery was one inspiration for the very popular three-volume novel Ten Thousand a-Year, by Samuel Warren (1807–1877). Warren also wrote directly of the case in his "Miscellanies", titling the article "The Romance of Forgery".

== See also ==
- Province of New York: in 1664, the Duke of York, James II of England, purchased Long Island and other lands granted to Stirling in 1635
