= Walter Hope Long Howard =

English peerage claimant

- Born: 19 May 1759
- Died: 1830?
- Occupation: Peerage claimant

Walter Hope Long Howard (19 May 1759 – 1830?) was an English peerage claimant.

== Biography ==
Howard born on 19 May 1759, was son of William Howard, by Catherine Titcombe of St. Helier, Jersey, and grandson of Charles Francis Howard of Overacres, and lord of Redesdale, Northumberland. His father claimed kinship with the ducal family of Norfolk; in 1750 he sold Overacres, the seigniories of Redesdale and Harbottle, and the advowson of Elsdon, Northumberland, to the Earl of Northumberland, and thenceforward appears to have been supported by Edward Howard, 9th Duke of Norfolk. Walter was sent by the duke to the college at St. Omer, but, being a Protestant, he was soon withdrawn. In 1773 he was placed with a wine merchant at Oporto. In 1777 his father and the duke died. He returned to England, and found that Duke Edward had bequeathed him an annuity of 45l. The new duke, Charles Howard, 10th Duke of Norfolk, became his friend, and continued the allowance previously made to his father. In 1793 he was much embarrassed by debts. The eleventh duke, Charles, seems to have satisfied himself from a pedigree in the College of Arms that Howard's claims to kinship with him were fictitious. On 21 December 1795 Howard was released from a debtors' prison, and by the duke's steward established at Ewood, Surrey, on a small property. The duke ordered him to be called ‘Mr. Smith.’ When he went to London to complain of this grievance, the duke refused to see him, and would not allow him to resume occupation of Ewood. Howard now devoted himself to correct the College of Arms pedigree of the ducal family, and to regain the Ewood property. He wrote to the lord chancellor, and tried to address the court of chancery in July 1809, and even attempted to address the House of Lords. Thomas Christopher Banks wrote a foolish pamphlet in his support, and drew up for him a petition to the king. Howard presented a petition to the prince regent on 25 April 1812, and waylaid the prince in Pall Mall on 12 May, for which he apologised in another letter. He was taken into custody on presenting himself at Norfolk House, and, after examination before a magistrate, was committed to prison. He obtained some allowance from the twelfth duke, Bernard Edward, and is believed to have died in 1830 or 1831. By his wife, Miss Jane Martin of Gateside, Westmoreland, he left no issue.
