= Lord Stirling Manor Site =

- U.S. National Register of Historic Places
- New Jersey Register of Historic Places
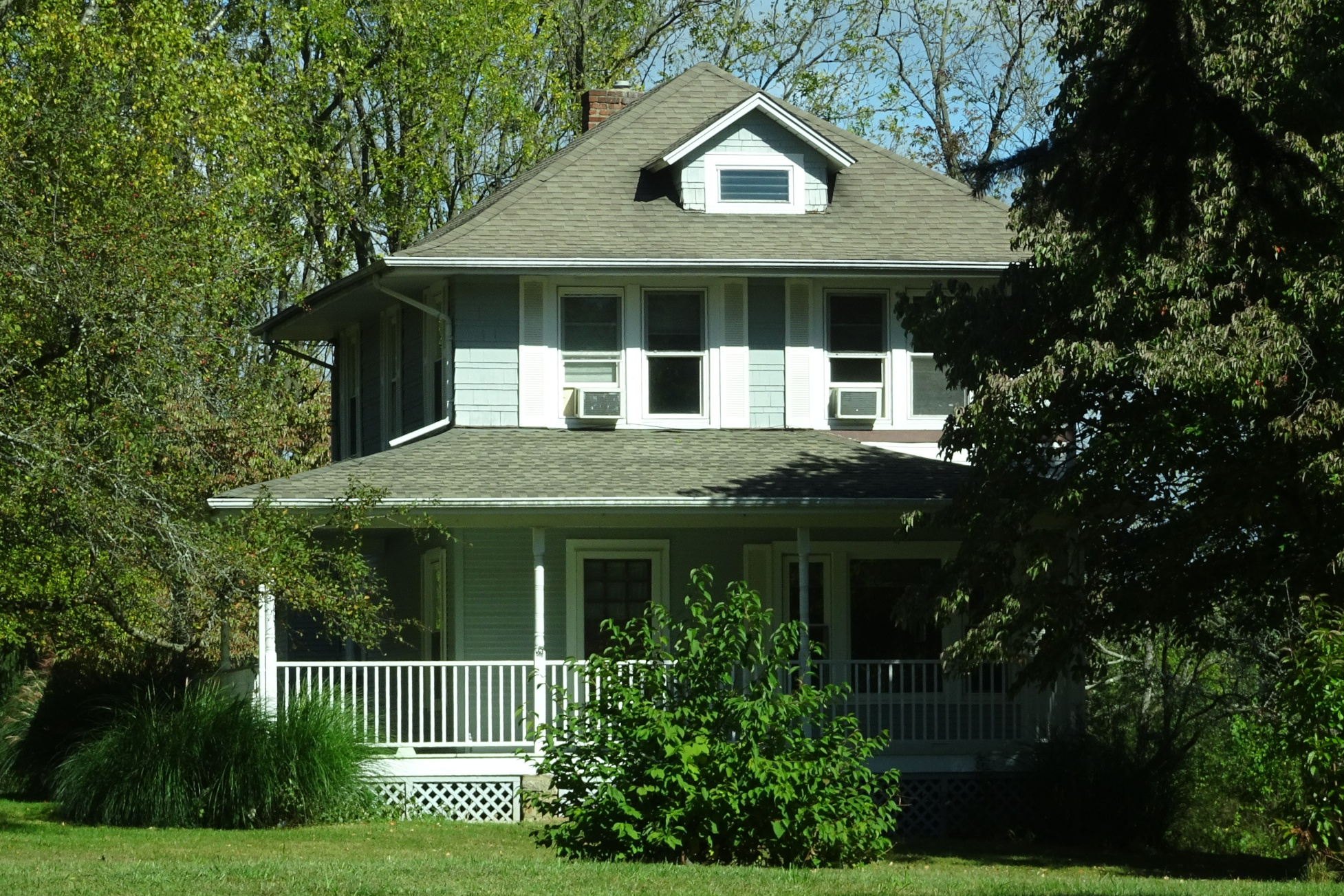
- New house built on foundation of Lord Stirling's Manor House

- Location within Somerset County, New Jersey Location within New Jersey Location within the United States
- Location: 96 Lord Stirling Road, Basking Ridge, New Jersey
- Coordinates: 40.69467°N 74.52989°W
- Area: 5 acres (2.0 ha)
- Built: 1761
- NRHP reference No.: 78001795
- NJRHP No.: 2475

Significant dates
- Added to NRHP: May 22, 1978
- Designated NJRHP: December 1, 1976

The Lord Stirling Manor Site is a historic site located at 96 Lord Stirling Road in the Basking Ridge section of Bernards Township in Somerset County, New Jersey. It was the property of the American General William Alexander, Lord Stirling. It is now part of Lord Stirling Park. The site was added to the National Register of Historic Places on May 22, 1978, for its significance in military and social history.

== History ==
Lord Stirling acquired the land from his father in 1761 and constructed the manor complex in 1763. It was one of the finest homes in the region, and local residents referred to his estate as "The Buildings." After his death in 1783, the property was sold, and the structures fell into disrepair. The house was rebuilt in 1825, though not according to the original design, and destroyed by fire in 1919. At the time of its nomination to the National Register, the only structures remaining from the original 1763 construction were the cisterns, slave quarters, various outbuildings, and the foundation of the mansion. The slave quarters were the only known surviving slave quarters in New Jersey and thus constitute a significant record of the History of slavery in New Jersey.

The manor site is currently occupied by a 1920s Montgomery Ward mail order house that was situated on the foundation of the original structure.

An archaeological excavation sponsored by Somerset County Parks unearthed thousands artifacts dating from Lord Stirling's occupation through the 20th century.

== Gallery ==
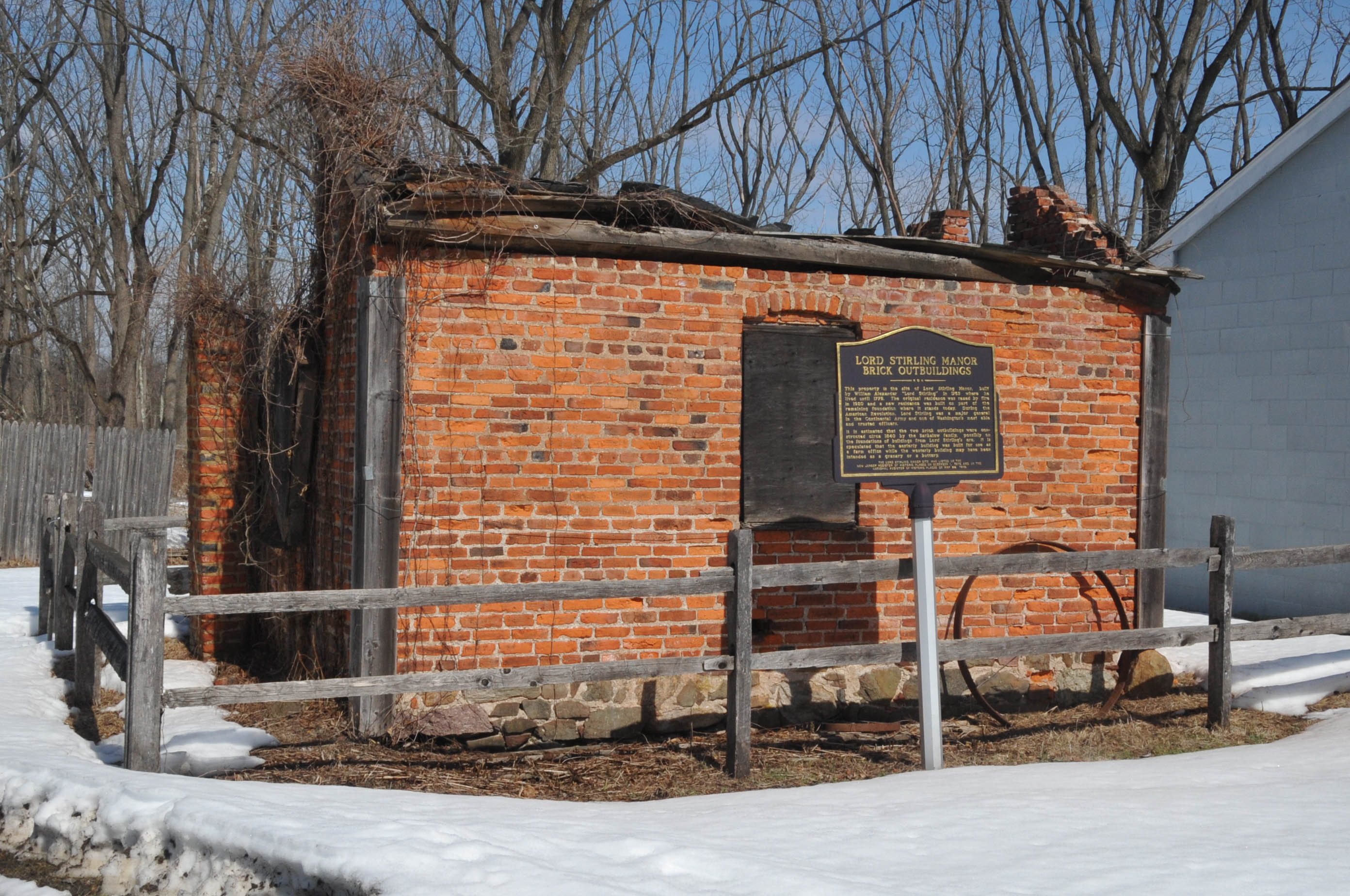
Brick outbuilding on manor site

== See also ==
- National Register of Historic Places listings in Somerset County, New Jersey
