= Lord Stirling Park =

Park in New Jersey, United States

Coordinates: 40.695721°N 74.541270°W

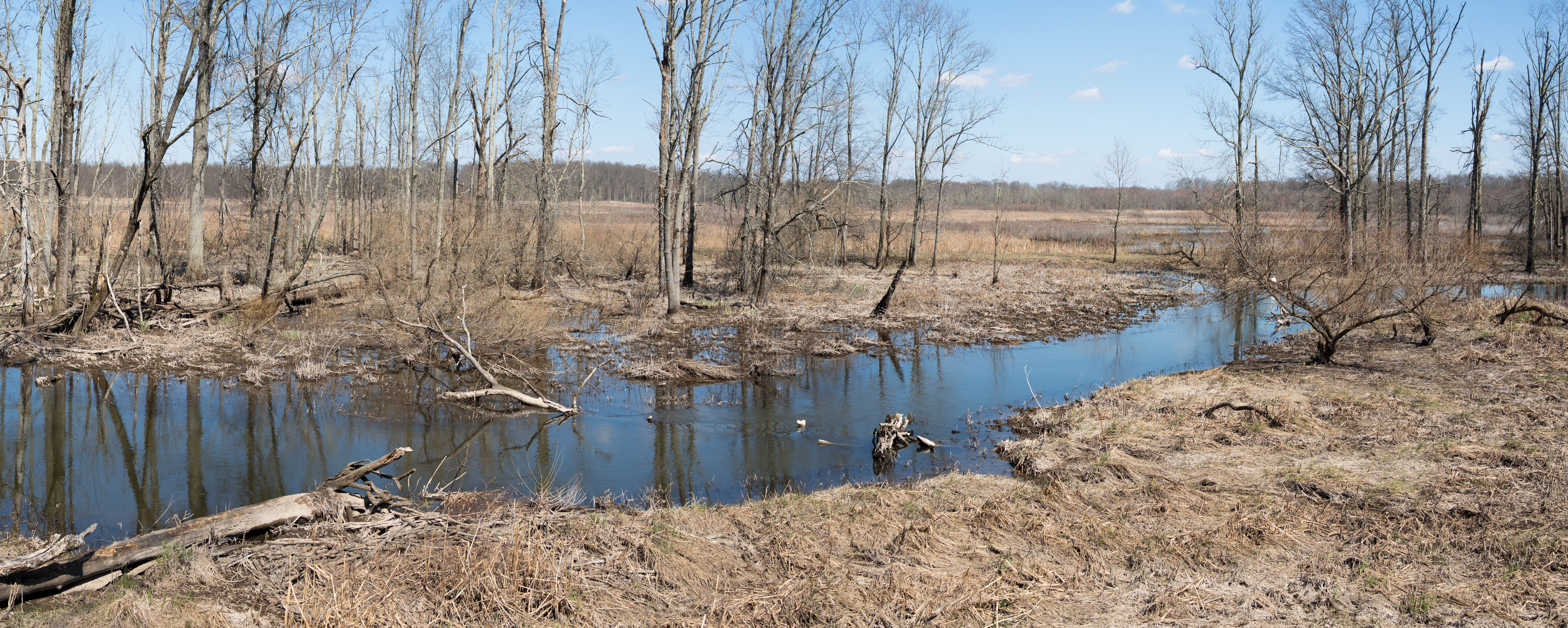
Passaic River running through Lord Stirling Park

Lord Stirling Park is a 925/950 acre park operated by the Somerset County Park Commission and located in Basking Ridge, New Jersey, and separated from the Great Swamp National Wildlife Refuge by the Passaic River. The park displays a diverse ecosystem in floodplains of the upper Passaic River and its contributors and contains swamps, fields, forests, brooks, marshes, and meadows.

Lord Stirling Park has two major parts. It is home to the Somerset County Environmental Education Center which contains 425 acres (1.72 km^{2}) and provides educational services for visitors and contains a gift shop; it is also the starting point for a number of hiking trails for the exploration of the park. The office and education building was the first public building in the United States that was solar-heated when opened in 1977. The original hot water solar heating system panels were replaced in 2013 with solar photovoltaic panels. The Lord Stirling Stable is an equestrian center with stables, an indoor arena, outdoor rings, and about 10 miles (16 km) of dedicated horseback trails in its 366-acre (1.48 km^{2}) section of the Lord Stirling Park.

The area was prehistorically part of the Glacial Lake Passaic. For thousands of years it has been inhabited, and current archeological sites explore the artifacts of the Lenape civilization. The park is named after William Alexander, Lord Stirling, a general of the American Revolution whose estate included the area. His manor is in an unopened part of the park.
