= Hannah Louisa Bedford =

British children's author (1847–1942)

H. Louisa Bedford
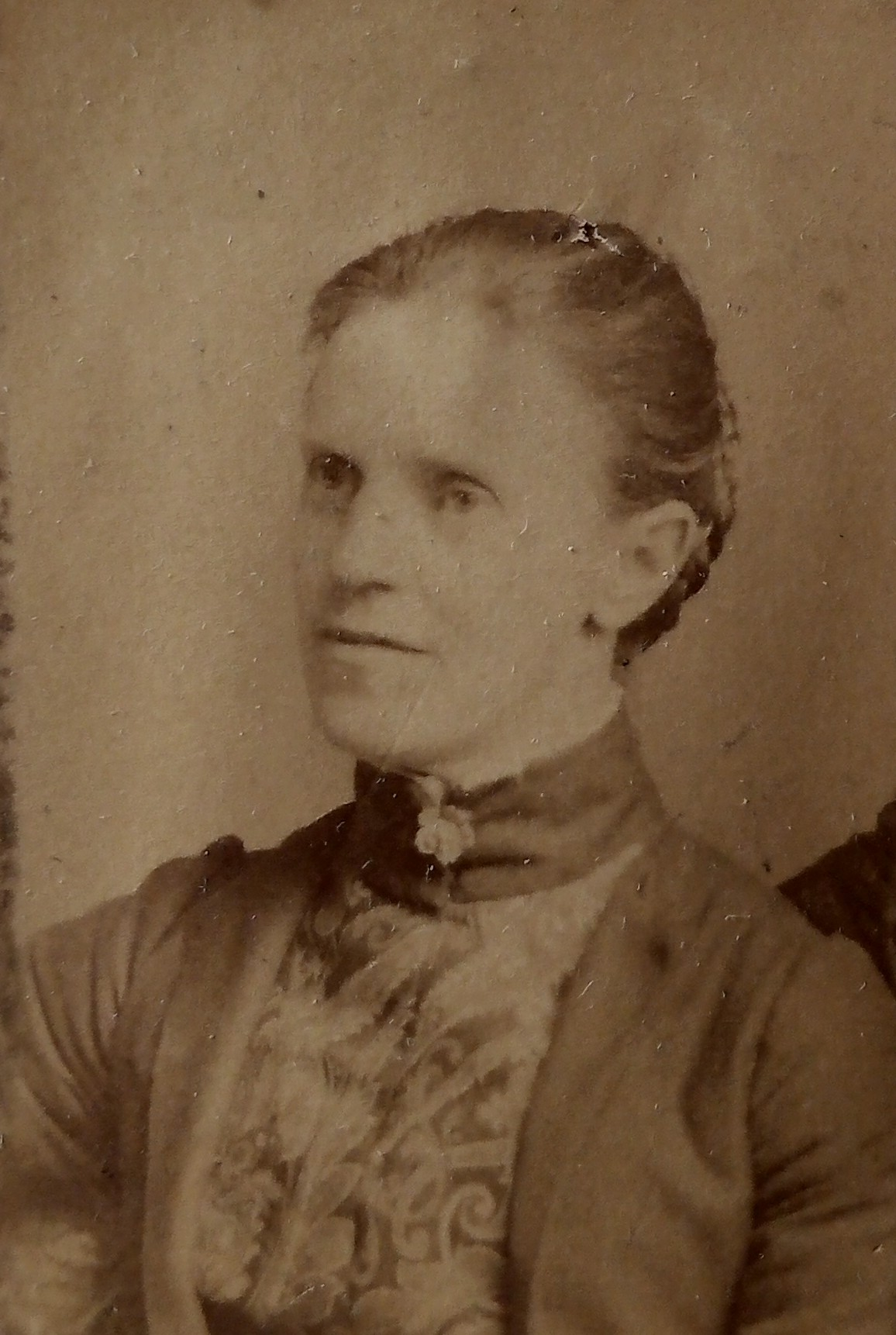
- Bedford c. 1901
- Born: Hannah Louisa Bedford; 26 December 1847 Coates, Whittlesey, England
- Died: 29 July 1942 (aged 95) Radlett, England
- Resting place: Christ Church, Radlett
- Occupation: Novelist; short story writer
- Period: 1895-1915
- Genre: Children's literature: christian

Hannah Louisa Bedford (26 December 1847 – 29 July 1942) writing under the name H. Louisa Bedford was a British novelist specialising in religious fiction for children and young adults.

== Early life and education ==
She was born on 26 December 1847 at Coates, Whittlesey, Cambridgeshire, the youngest daughter of Thomas Bedford and his wife Hannah (nee Russel). Her father was the incumbent of the Wesleyan Methodist Chapel at Coates, two and a half miles east of Whittlesey, where Hannah Louisa was baptised on 23 January 1848. Her parents employed a governess for her and her siblings. After her mother died, Thomas, who was now rector at Elstree, married Sophia Fewtrell Wylde on 1 December 1868. Sophia was a vicar's daughter, who was twenty years younger than him.

Hannah never married and lived with her parents at Oak Bank, Radlett.

== Career ==
She began writing fiction for young adult readers with Evelyn Everett-Green, who was already an established author. Their first novel His Choice and Hers (1895) is the "essentially modern" tale of Cyril Benson, the incumbent of St Chads, a church in the slums of the East London, and Sylvia O'Connor, and blends Christianity and romance. The London Evening Standard noted that the work was "wholly unlike" Green's usual style and lamented "We do not think that this new departure of the authoress is at all a successful one." The two women collaborated on at least two more novels.

By 1896, Bedford was writing her own novels, which were published by the Society for Promoting Christian Knowledge (S.P.C.K) and Religious Tract Society (R.T.S). Some of her works were criticised for zealotry. A review of Mrs Merriman's Godchild complained "it is a simple tale for children, surely it is not necessary to introduce so much dogma." Moreover, her often tragic and melancholic endings were seen as unsuitable for young readers. Cyril Benson in His Choice and Hers (1895) dies of a broken heart when Sylvia O'Connor rejects his offer, and Prue Tracey in Prue the Poetess (1897) dies, giving "the tale a sadness and a pathos which, however true and real in itself, lessens the pleasure with which the story would have been read". Bedford also wrote short stories in popular journals such as Quiver and The Girl's Own Paper.

Her later novels such as Under One Standard (1911), A Home in the Bush (1913) and Jack the Englishman: A Story of Tasmania (1914) were set in locations in the British Empire and she was praised for her authenticity. She may have been inspired by her sister Jane who emigrated to Australia and who later lived in Launceston, Tasmania. However, as McGillis argues the settings are incidental to Bedford's underlying missionizing purpose.

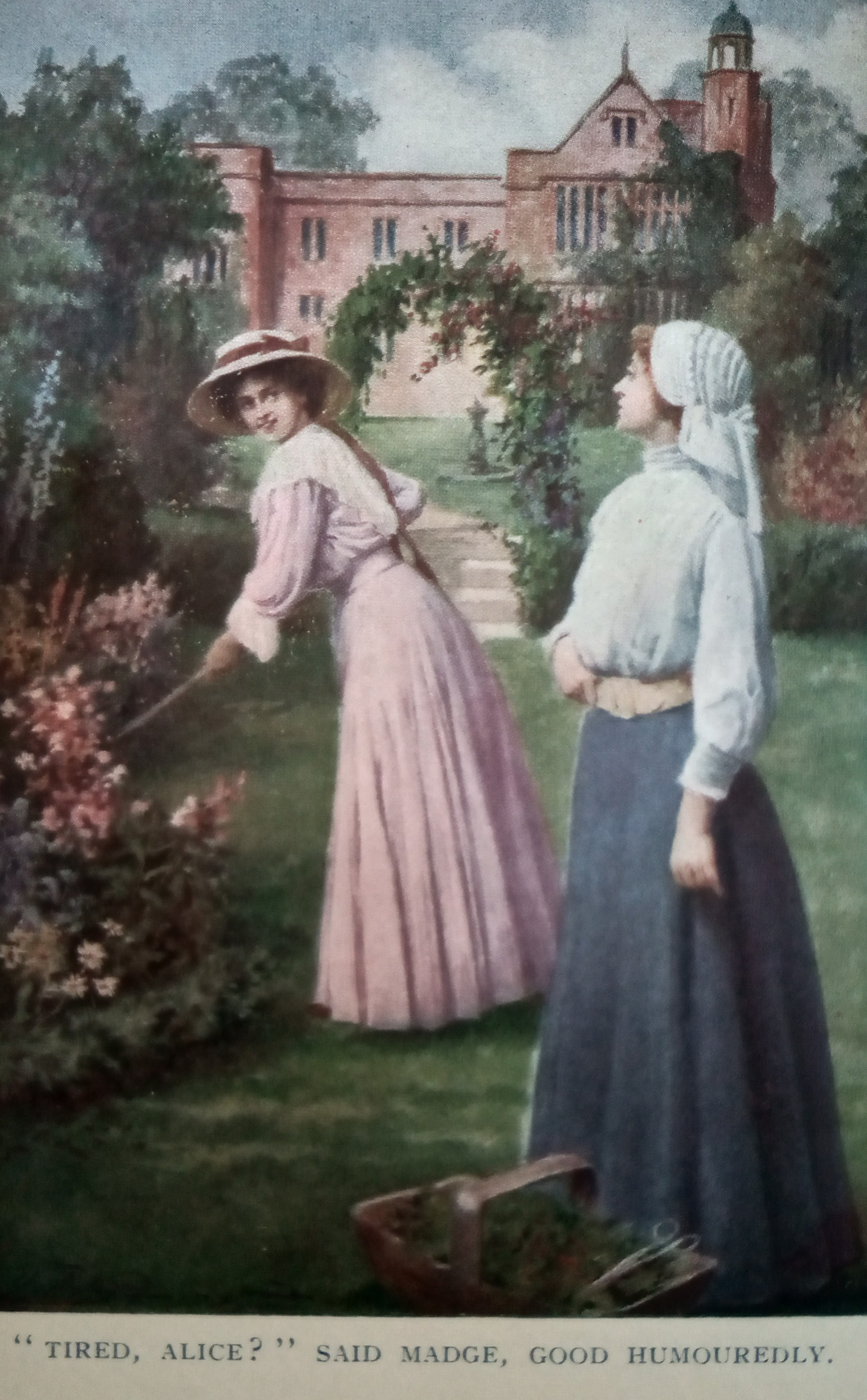
Illustration from Her Treasure of Truth, 1910.

== Later life ==
After her father died in 1901, she lived at St Stephen's, 23, Cross Path with Sophia T.A. Wylde. She died on 29 July 1942 and is buried at Christ Church, Radlett. She left an estate of over £14,000 to Dorothea Bridgman and Marjorie Venning O.B.E.

== Novels and short stories ==
- His Choice and Hers (S.P.C.K, 1895) with E. Everett Green
- Enid's Ugly Duckling (1896) with E. Everett Green
- Miss Chllcott's Legacy (1896)
- 'When the Morning Cometh', Quiver (Jan 1897) with E. Everett Green
- Prue the Poetess (1897)
- Mrs Merriman's Godchild (S.P.C.K., 1897)
- Ralph Rodney's Mother (1898)
- 'The Grooves of Change' The Girl's Own Paper (August 1898)
- I will be a Sailor (1899)
- The Village by the River (1900)
- Priscilla: A Story for Girls (1900) with E. Everett Green
- Daniel's Fallen Dagon (1900)
- A Maid Whom There were None to Praise (1901)
- 'The Autocrat of Rockhaven', Lancashire Evening Post (25 October 1901).
- Her Only Son Isaac (1901)
- A Maid Whom There were None to Praise (1901)
- Robin the Rebel (1903)
- Daniel Maynard's Fortune (1904)
- Fighting His Way; Or Carew of Burcombe (1904)
- The Twins that Did Not Pair (1906)
- To Do and Dare (R.S.T., 1907)
- The Deerhurst Girls; or A Triple Alliance (1907)
- Love and a Will o' the Wisp (1908)
- Barbara's Heroes (1908)
- Her Treasure of Truth (1909)
- Mr Punch and Party (1909)
- 'A Sonnet with Strings' Quincy Patriot (Jul-Sep 1909)
- Drusilla The Second (1910)
- Netta, Two Boys and a Bird (1911)
- His Will and Her Way (Stanley Paul and Co., 1911)
- Under One Standard; or The Touch That Makes Us Kin: A Story of the Time of the Maori War (1911)
- Maids in Many Moods (Stanley Paul and Co., 1912)
- A Home in the Bush (S.P.C.K., 1913)
- Jack the Englishman: A Story of Tasmania (1914)
- The Ventures of Hope (R.T.S., 1914)
- Life's Purpose for Her (1914)
- The Siege of Mr Johnson (1915)
- 'The Day of Salvation: Founded in Fact', The Northern Messenger
