= Methodist Reform Church =

Short-lived precursor to the United Methodist Church

The Methodist Reform Church was a Christian denomination that was formed in 1849 in England by a breakaway from the Wesleyan Methodists.

The leaders of the Wesleyan Reformers had been expelled from the Wesleyan Methodist Church at its Manchester Conference in 1849. The expelled ministers and first leaders of the Wesleyan Reformers were James Everett, William Griffith and Samuel Dunn. In March 1850, 400 delegates met at the Albion Chapel, Moorfields, London to establish a new connexion.

Diagram of Methodist division and union. The group is named as "Wesleyan Reformers".

The church dissolved in 1857 when most of the members amalgamated with the Wesleyan Association to form the United Methodist Free Churches, which later became the United Methodist Church. The remaining members formed the Wesleyan Reform Union in 1859.

William and Catherine Booth, the co-founders of the Salvation Army, were members for a time in early adulthood.
