= Samuel Warren (British lawyer) =

British writer, lawyer and politician

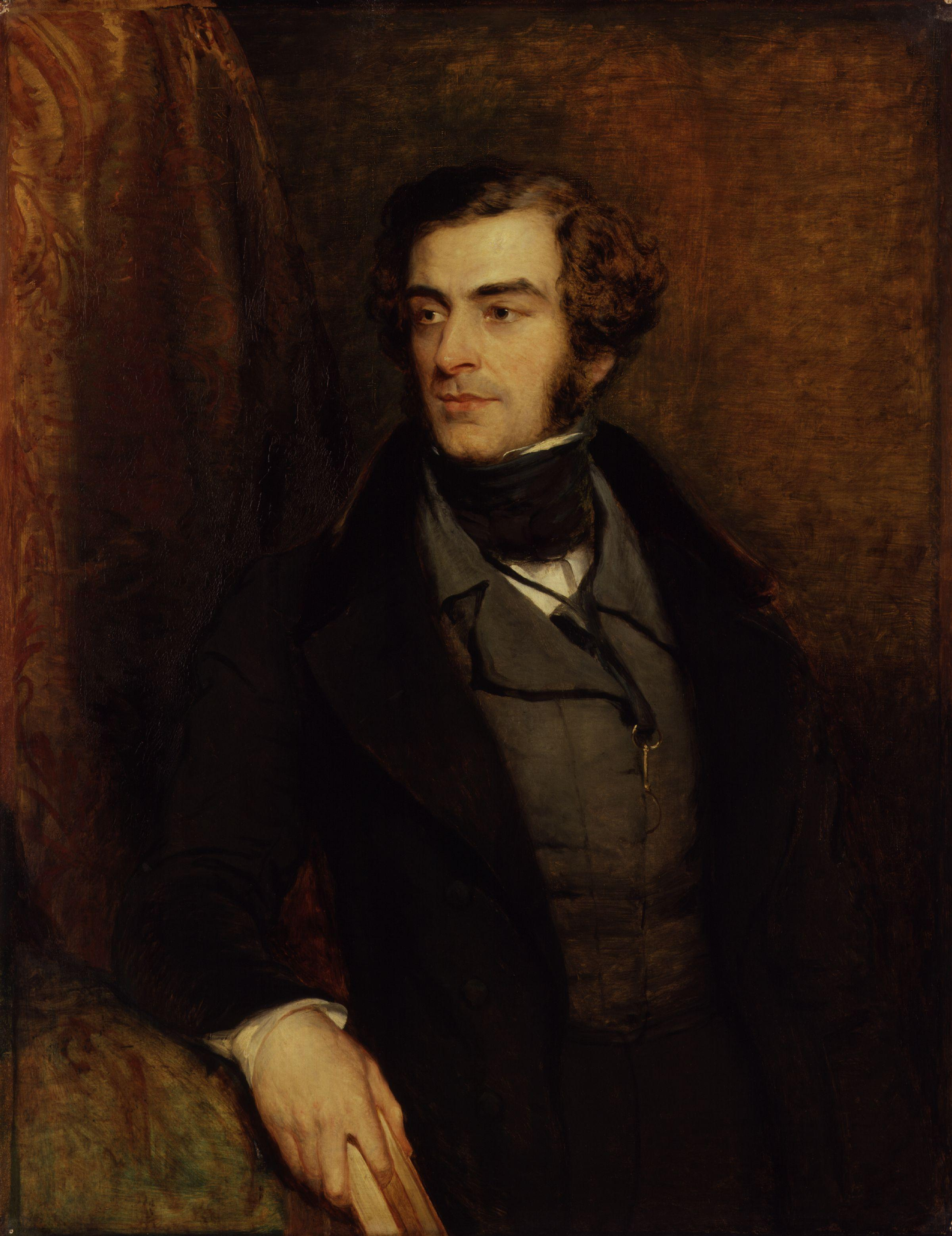
- Samuel Warren (c. 1835–1840), by John Linnell.
- Born: 23 May 1808; Rackery Farm near Wrexham, Denbighshire, UK
- Died: 29 July 1877 (aged 69); London, UK
- Education: University of Edinburgh
- Occupations: British writer, lawyer and politician

Samuel Warren (23 May 1807 – 29 July 1877) was a British barrister, novelist and MP.

== Life ==
He was born in Wales at Rackery Farm near Wrexham, Denbighshire, the son of Anne (née Williams), who died in 1823, and Samuel Warren (1781–1862), a Wesleyan Methodist minister, who formed a breakaway group, and in later life was an Anglican priest in Ancoats. The memoirs of Samuel Dousland Waddy, an apprentice in 1820 to a London linen draper, state that Warren was also an apprentice there. It is thought by Dunlop that as a teenager Warren worked in a medical capacity, perhaps as an apprentice to an apothecary.

Warren attended the University of Edinburgh to study medicine, in the years 1826 to 1828, where he won prizes and attention, but did not take a degree. He then entered the Inner Temple, studying law and acting as a special pleader, and was called to the bar in 1837. In 1852 he was made Recorder of Hull.

Entering politics, Warren sat in the House of Commons for Midhurst 1856–1859, and was a Master in Lunacy 1859–1877. He was elected a Fellow of the Royal Society in April 1835. He died in London.

== Works ==
Passages from the Diary of a Late Physician, by Warren but initially published anonymously, was a series of sensational tales, fictional case histories, published first in Blackwood's Magazine from August 1830 to 1837. It was hugely successful. The frame story to the series is of "early struggles" of a young medical man, and has been taken to contain embellished autobiographical material. In the preface to fifth edition (1855) was Warren's statement that "I was six years actively engaged in the practical study of physic".

The structure and use of professional anecdotes as a vehicle are now considered foundational for later mainstream crime fiction. The tales contributed also to a sub-genre of the short story, known as "Blackwood's fiction", which often used the supernatural, or apparent supernatural, and owed something to John Ferriar and Samuel Hibbert-Ware. Proposed bookends are an 1821 story by William Maginn, and one by Samuel Ferguson in 1837, when Warren's series had concluded.

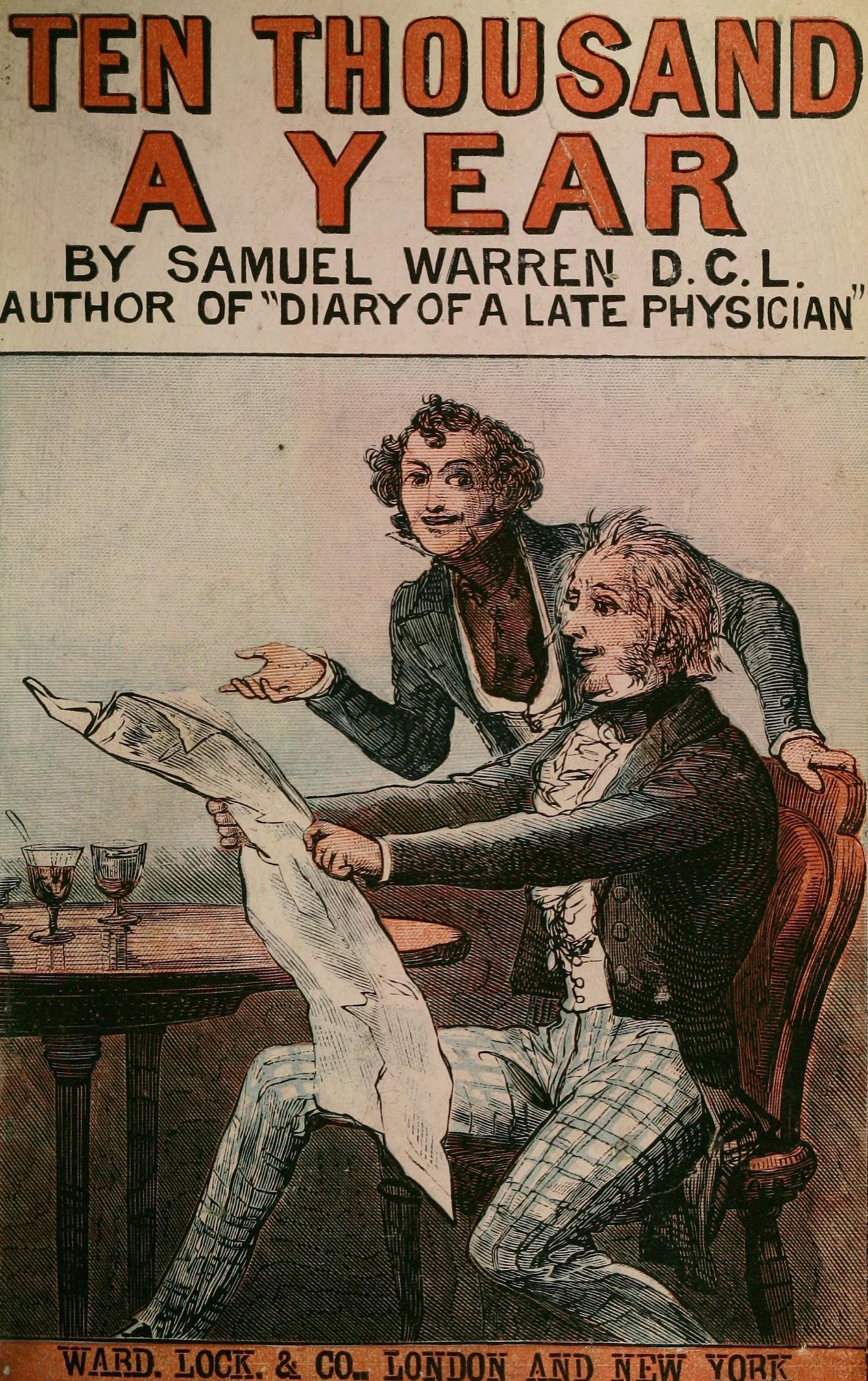
1884 Yellow-back cover of Ten Thousand a-Year

Warren was also the author of two novels:

1. Ten Thousand a-Year (1839), with social satire written from a Tory standpoint. First published in Blackwood's Magazine. It was based on the contemporary peerage claim of Alexander Humphrys-Alexander, a forgery case.
2. Now and Then (1847), a social novel of criminality and the law, arguing from a Methodist perspective the moral case for reform. It was based in outline on an actual case in Wolverhampton, and had little success.

The influence of Warren on Charles Dickens has been traced, for example in Bleak House.

Warren was also a legal writer. His Select Extracts from Blackstone's Commentaries (first edition 1836) was with John William Smith, whose name did not appear.

== Family ==
Warren married in 1831 Elizabeth (Eliza) Ballenger (died 1868), daughter of James Ballenger of Woodford Bridge House, Essex, who had married in 1824 W. Vanhouse; they had two sons and a daughter. Eliza's father, who died in 1830, was a sugar refiner in Davenant Street, Whitechapel.

The elder son, Samuel Lilckendey Warren (born 1835), graduated B.A. in 1859 and became an Anglian priest. The younger son, Edward Walpole Warren (1838–1903), was another cleric, a Cambridge graduate. He was rector of Holy Trinity Episcopal Church, Manhattan, from 1887 to 1895.

Warren married, secondly, Louisa Beaumont in 1871.

Parliament of the United Kingdom
Preceded by Spencer Horatio Walpole	Member of Parliament for Midhurst; 1856–1859	Succeeded by John Hardy
