= John Booth Sharpley =

- Born: 12 March 1800
- Died: 24 June 1872 (aged 72)
- Occupation: Corn merchant
- Known for: Methodist reformer and local official
- Office: Mayor of Louth, Lincolnshire

John Booth Sharpley (1800–1872) was a corn merchant, Methodist reformer and public official in Louth, Lincolnshire. He was elected to the Louth Town Council as a Liberal and was Mayor of Louth three times.

== Business career ==
Sharpley started out as a draper in partnership with Michael Plaskitt. Their business premises were in the Market Place. The partnership was dissolved in 1830, when he took over his father's business and became a successful coal and corn merchant.

== Methodism ==
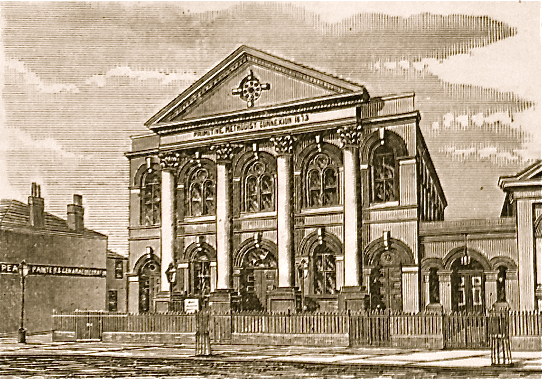
Louth Free Methodist Chapel in 1855. It was situated opposite Sharpley’s house.

Sharpley was initially a member of the Wesleyan Methodists and became a preacher in 1822. In 1849 he was a leading spokesman for the reform movement. He was expelled by the Wesleyan Methodists and became a Free Methodist, drawing up the constitution for the Louth branch in 1858. In 1858 he wrote Louth Free Methodism Vindicated in response to criticism. He has been described as sitting 'among his books like an astrologer among his spheres and altitudes’. "Sharpley held a variety of local offices in Methodism. He acted as a class leader, but he was also secretary of the local preachers and treasurer of the trustees of the country chapels."

== Political activities ==
In the 1841 election Sharpley actively supported a Whig (Liberal) candidate in defiance of the rule that Methodists should not take partisan positions. He was elected to the town council, becoming an Alderman and three times Mayor. He was instrumental in establishing a British School in Louth during his first term in office. He was appointed as a JP and has been described as "a kind of leading star among the magistrates".

== Personal life ==
Sharpley was born in Louth in 1800, the son of Anthony Sharpley and Ann Booth. He married Elizabeth Hay at Holton-le-Clay on 23 September 1824. He died on 24 June 1872. In 1874 a plaque was erected to his memory in Louth Methodist Chapel.
