= Ten Thousand a-Year =

1841 novel by Samuel Warren

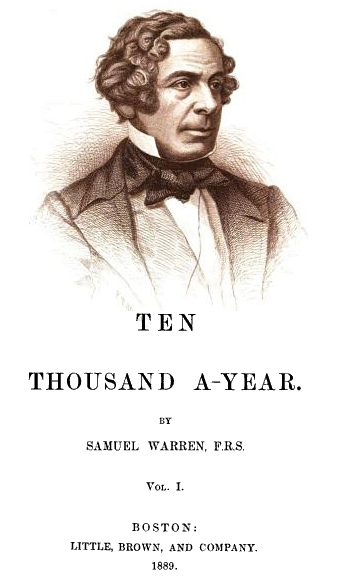
- Vol. 1 cover plate for 1889 edition
- Author: Samuel Warren
- Language: English
- Genre: novel
- Publisher: William Blackwood and Sons (UK); Carey and Hart (US)
- Publication date: 1841
- Publication place: United Kingdom
- Media type: Print (Hardback)
- Pages: 514 pp (Vol. 1, hardback)

Ten Thousand a-Year is a novel written by English barrister Samuel Warren. First published in 1841, it enjoyed widespread popularity in the United States and Europe for much of the century.

== Background ==
When first published, the novel was split into three volumes for its United Kingdom release and six volumes for release in the United States. Despite Edgar Allan Poe's critical panning of the book as "shamefully ill-written" in the November 1841 issue of Graham's Magazine, it went on to become one of the most popular novels of the era in both the United States and Europe. New print runs and updated editions were published regularly to the turn of the century.

The story chronicles events in the life of its iconic protagonist Tittlebat Titmouse and offers in-depth detail of English common law of the time.

Ten Thousand a-Year was, in fact, first published in the Edinburgh Magazine in instalments in 1839. The first instalment appeared in October of that year at page 505 of No. CCLXXXVIII.

== Characters ==
It has been said that the characters from the novel listed in the first column of the table below represent the real persons listed in the second column of that table.

Character from the novel	Real person whom he is said to represent
Mr Crystal	Cresswell
Mr Justice Grayley	Mr Justice Bayley
Mr Lynx	Wightman
Mr Quicksilver	Brougham
Mr Sterling	Pollock CB
Mr Subtle	Scarlett
Sir Charles Westenholme	Lord Lyndhurst
Lord Widdrington	Lord Tenterden
