= Dog-tooth =

Ornament used in medieval architecture

Dog-tooth ornament

In architecture, a dog-tooth or dogtooth pattern is an ornament found in the mouldings of medieval work of the commencement of the 12th century, which is thought to have been introduced by the Crusaders. The earliest example is found in the hall at Rabbath Ammon in Moab in Jordan (c. 614) built by the Sassanians, where it decorates the arch moulding of the blind arcades and the string courses. The pattern consists of four flower petals forming a square or diamond shape with central elements. The petals have the form of the pointed conical canine tooth, eye tooth or cuspid.

In the apse of a church at Murano, near Venice, it is similarly employed. In the 12th and 13th centuries it was further elaborated with carving, losing therefore its primitive form, but constituting a most beautiful decorative feature. In Elgin Cathedral in Scotland, the dogtooth ornament in the archivolt becomes a four-lobed leaf, and in Stone church in Kent, a much more enriched type of flower. The term has been supposed to originate in a resemblance to the dog tooth violet, but the original idea of a projecting tooth is a sufficient explanation.

== See also ==
- Ball flower
- Dentil, also means "tooth", but under cornices
