= Protestant Methodists =

The Protestant Methodists were a small Methodist church based in Leeds. They left the Methodist conference in 1827 in protest at the installation of an organ in Brunswick Chapel in Leeds. This grew into a wider dispute around the style of government of the conference, though it continued to be known as the Leeds Organ Dispute. The Protestant Methodists constituted themselves as a separate body in 1828.

Timeline of Methodist connexions in Britain

In 1836, the group joined the Wesleyan Association, by which time they consisted of several thousand members, mostly in Leeds. Through subsequent mergers, the Wesleyan Association became part of the United Methodist Church in 1907 and in 1932 became part of the Methodist Church of Great Britain.
