= Wesleyan Association =

The Wesleyan Association, or the Wesleyan Methodist Association, was a 19th-century Wesleyan denomination in the United Kingdom. It was formed in 1836 and merged with other groups to form the United Methodist Free Churches in 1857.

The Associated Wesleyans absorbed the Protestant Methodists, a small earlier secession of 1827.

The prominent figure was Robert Eckett (1797–1862), who was expelled from the Wesleyan Methodist Church in 1836. He had been a leading figure in the Leeds Organ Dispute. In 1840 he planned the Foundation Deed, which emphasized the democratic nature of the Wesleyan Association. He also played a large role in the amalgamation of the Wesleyan Association and the Methodist Reform Church in 1857 to form the United Methodist Free Churches.

The Associated Wesleyans sent several missionaries to Jamaica and Australia.
