= United Methodist Free Churches =

United Methodist Free Churches, sometimes called Free Methodists, was an English Nonconformist denomination in the last half of the 19th century. It was formed in 1857 by the amalgamation of the Wesleyan Association (which had in 1836 largely absorbed the Protestant Methodists of 1828) and the Wesleyan Reformers (dating from 1849, when a number of Methodist ministers were expelled from the Wesleyan Methodist Church on a charge of insubordination).

It merged with the Bible Christian Church and the Methodist New Connexion to form the United Methodist Church in 1907.

The United Methodist Free Churches had sent missionaries and established congregations in various colonies of Australia. These joined with four other Methodist denominations to unite as the Methodist Church of Australasia in 1902.

== See also ==
- List of Protestant missionary societies in China (1807–1953)
- Wesleyan Reform Union
