= James Everett (writer) =

English Methodist and miscellaneous writer

James Everett (1784–1872) was an English Methodist and miscellaneous writer. He was a prominent figure behind the formation of the United Methodist Free Churches.

== Life ==
Everett was born in 1784 at Alnwick in Northumberland. He was the second son of John Everett and his wife, Margaret Bowmaker. Everett's father died when he was young, and the boy soon learned to help his mother. After a short time at a private school in Alnwick, he was apprenticed to a general dealer, where he was given to fun and practical jokes. In 1803 he underwent a great change, joined the Wesleyan society, and began to preach.

He refused an offer made in 1804 to send him to Hoxton Academy to prepare for the ministry among the independents. At the end of his apprenticeship in 1804 he went to Sunderland, and there showed such preaching power that in December 1806 he was recommended for the regular ministry among the Wesleyan Methodists, and was duly accepted by the conference of the following year. His first circuits were Sunderland, Shields, and Belper in Derbyshire. He obtained a good knowledge of practical theology, and a wide acquaintance with general literature.

In August 1810 he married Elizabeth Hutchinson of Sunderland.

== Recollections ==
At an early period he formed the habit of taking careful notes of the celebrated characters whom he met, and thus preserved recollections of Robert Southey, poet laureate, James Montgomery, William Dawson, and many others. In 1815 he was appointed to the Manchester circuit. On account of a serious throat infection in 1821, Everett gave up the regular ministry and became a bookseller, first in Sheffield, afterwards in Manchester. He had been collecting materials for the history of Methodism in those towns, part of which he published. He was the intimate friend and became the biographer of Dr. Adam Clarke. Everett preached occasional and special sermons while in business, and extended his popularity. In 1834 he resumed full ministerial work at Newcastle upon Tyne, and thence moved to York in 1839. Through failure of health he was again made a supernumerary minister in 1842, but remained in York, and employed his pen more actively than ever.

== Expulsion ==
The foremost event in Everett's life was his expulsion from the Wesleyan Methodist Conference in August 1849. For many years he had been opposed to its policy and working and published anonymously several volumes of free criticism, such as The Disputants in 1835, arguing against the scheme to start a theological college for the training of ministers. He wrote much of Wesleyan Takings, two volumes of disparaging sketches of the preachers. In 1845 and following years certain clandestine pamphlets called "Fly Sheets" were circulated widely, bearing neither printer's nor publisher's names. These contained serious charges against the leading men of the conference, reflecting on their public actions and their personal characters.

A general suspicion attributed these pamphlets to Everett. He was brought before the conference and questioned about them, but declined to give any answer. After further inquiry and discussion he was formally expelled.

== Free Church ==
Everett then took the lead in agitation against the conference, which shook the entire Wesleyan community and resulted in the loss of over 200,000 members and adherents. Some of the seceders, the Methodist Reformers, joined others who had previously left the "old body" and formed a new body, the United Methodist Free Churches. This was in 1857, and Everett was elected its first president when it met at Rochdale in July of that year.

To the end of his life Everett remained a minister of this community, filling their pulpits as health and opportunity permitted. He lived for some years in Newcastle and finally in Sunderland. He wrote many articles for magazines and printed a few poems. In July 1865 his wife died, leaving no children. Everett had formed a large collection of Methodist literature, both printed and in manuscript. These he disposed of to the Rev. Luke Tyerman, biographer of Wesley. His library was bought after his death for the theological institute of the United Methodist Free Churches. He died at Sunderland on 10 May 1872.

== Works ==
- History of Methodism in Sheffield and its vicinity, vol. 1, 1823
- History of Methodism in Manchester and its vicinity, pt. 1, 1827
- The Village Blacksmith: Memoirs of S. Hick, 1831
- Edwin, or Northumbria's Royal Fugitive Restored, a metrical tale of Saxon times, 1831
- The Polemic Divine: Memoirs of Rev. D. Isaac, 1839
- Memoirs of William Dawson, 1842
- Correspondence of William Dawson, 1842
- Adam Clarke Portrayed, 3 vols, 1843–1849
- The Wallsend Miner: Life of W. Crister, 2nd ed., 1851
- The Camp and the Sanctuary, 1859
- Gatherings from the Pit Heaps, or the Allens of Shiney Row, 1861
- The Midshipman and the Minister: Sketch of the Rev. A. A. Rees, circa 1861. Everett was co-editor with John Holland of Memoirs of the Life and Writings of James Montgomery, 7 vols. 1854–6.
