= William Alexander, 1st Earl of Stirling =

Scottish courtier and poet involved in colonization of Nova Scotia (1567–1640)

The Right Honourable The Earl of Stirling PC
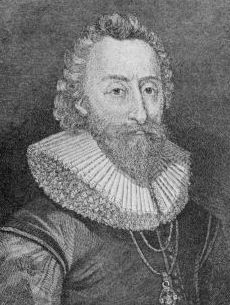
- William Alexander, 1st Earl of Stirling

Secretary of State for Scotland
- In office 1626–1640 Serving with Sir Archibald Acheson
- Monarch: Charles I
- Preceded by: The Earl of Haddington
- Succeeded by: The Duke of Hamilton

Personal details
- Born: William Alexander; 1567 Menstrie, Clackmannanshire, Kingdom of Scotland
- Died: February 12, 1640 (aged 72-73) London, Kingdom of England
- Spouse: Janet Erskine
- Parent: Alexander Alexander of Menstrie
- Occupation: Politician

Arms of William Alexander, 1st Earl of Stirling: Quarterly: 1st & 4th: Per pale argent and sable a chevron and a crescent in base counterchanged (Alexander of Menstrie); 2nd & 3rd: Or, a lymphad sable between three crosses crosslet bottony fitchée gules 2&1. (Stirling). In the point of honour an escutcheon argent, a cross saltire azure charged with an escutcheon of the arms of Scotland.

William Alexander, 1st Earl of Stirling PC (c. 1567 – 12 February 1640) was a Scottish courtier and poet who was involved in the Scottish colonisation of Charles Fort, later Port-Royal, Nova Scotia in 1629 and Long Island, New York. His literary works include Aurora (1604), The Monarchick Tragedies (1604) and Doomes-Day (1614, 1637).

== Biography ==
=== Early life ===
William Alexander was the son of Alexander of Menstrie and Marion, daughter of an Allan Couttie. He was born at Menstrie Castle, near Stirling. The family was old and claimed to be descended from Somerled, Lord of the Isles, through John of Islay. Because his father died in 1580, and William was entrusted to the care of his great-uncle James in Stirling, he was probably educated at Stirling grammar school. There is a tradition that he was at the University of Glasgow; and, according to his friend the poet William Drummond of Hawthornden, he was a student at Leiden University.

As a young man, William became tutor to the Earl of Argyll and accompanied him on his travels in France, Spain and Italy. William married, before 1604, Janet, daughter of Sir William Erskine "The Parson of Campsie", one of the Balgonie family.

He was introduced by Argyll to the court of King James VI in Edinburgh, taking on the role of a courtier-poet. He was one of the senior aristocrats who moved to London with the king in 1603 when he became King of England. He received the place of Gentleman Usher to Prince Charles, son of James I of England (James VI of Scotland), in 1603, and continued in favour at court after Prince Charles became Charles I of England in 1625. In 1607, his father-in-law received a pension of £200 a year to be shared with William, and half the pension continued after Erskine's death.

William built a reputation as a poet and writer of rhymed tragedies, and assisted King James I and VI in preparing the metrical version known as "The Psalms of King David, translated by King James" and published by authority of Charles I. James knighted him in 1609 and appointed him the Master of Requests for Scotland in 1614, effectively his private secretary. In 1613, he began a correspondence with the poet William Drummond of Hawthornden, which ripened into a lifelong intimacy after their 1614 meeting at Menstrie Castle, where Alexander was on one of his short annual visits.

William Alexander was involved in the silver mines at Hilderston by 1614. In 1615, he was made a member of the Scottish Privy Council. Alexander was an active freemason, belonging to Mary's Chapel Lodge, Edinburgh, from July 1634.

=== Nova Scotia ===
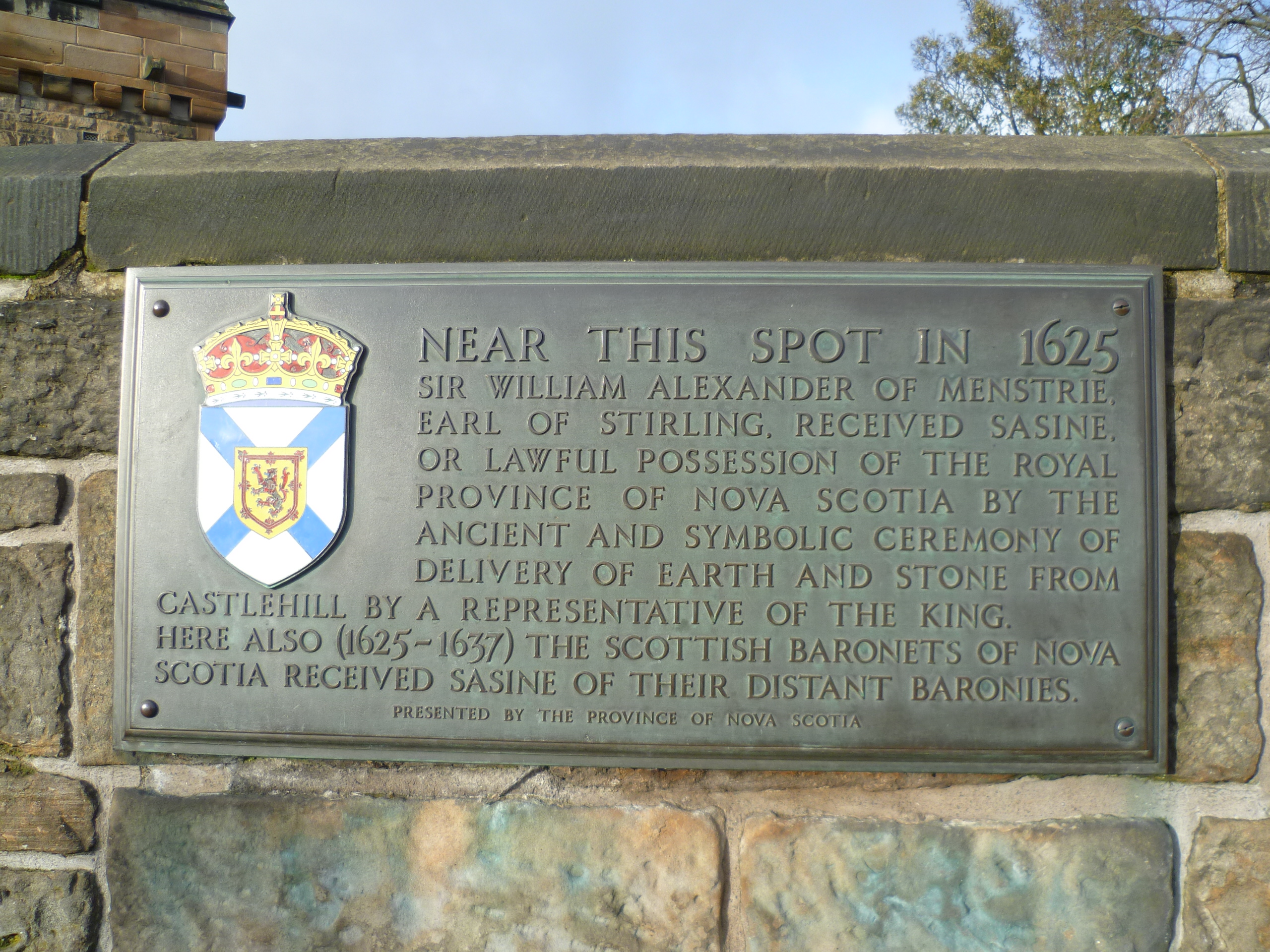
Nova Scotia plaque on the esplanade of Edinburgh Castle

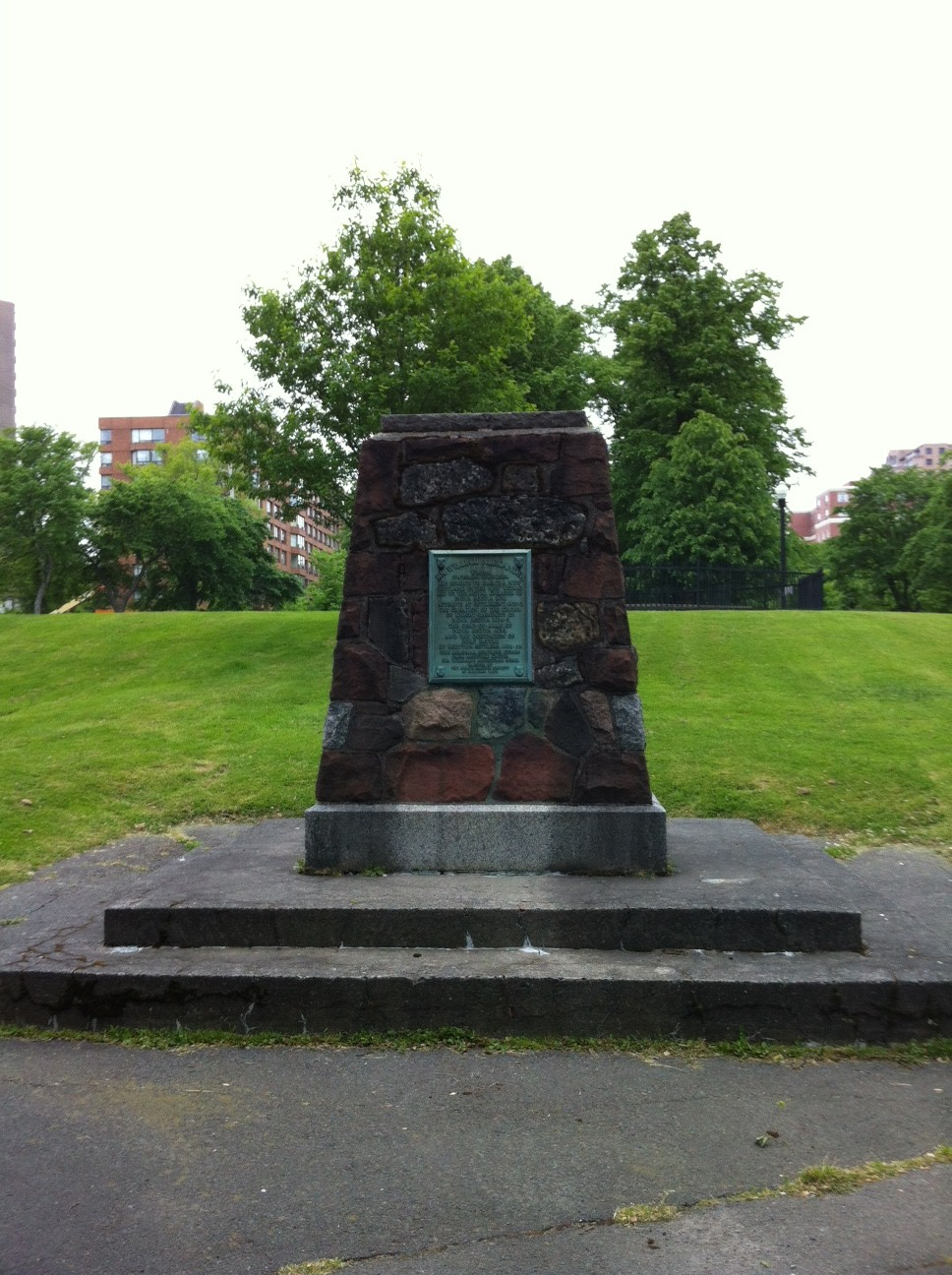
William Alexander Monument, built of stones from his Menstrie Castle, Victoria Park, Halifax, Nova Scotia (1957)

In 1621, King James I granted Stirling a royal charter appointing him mayor of a vast territory which was enlarged into a lordship and barony of Nova Scotia (meaning New Scotland); the area is now known as Nova Scotia, New Brunswick, and parts of the northern United States. The creation of Baronets of Nova Scotia was used to settle the plantation of the new province, which was later increased (at least on paper) to include much of Canada.

Stirling was appointed as Secretary of State for Scotland in 1626 and held that office for the rest of his life. Lord Stirling's efforts at colonisation were less successful, at least in monetary terms, as his recruitment efforts made unrealistic promises about the new territory and were offered on meager terms. He briefly established a Scottish settlement at Charles Fort, later Port-Royal, Nova Scotia, led by his son William Alexander (the younger). However, the effort cost him most of his fortune, and when the region—now Canada's three Maritime Provinces and the state of Maine—was returned to France in 1632, it was lost. He was unable to obtain from the treasury, in spite of royal support, £6,000 as compensation for his losses. He spent his later years with limited means. However, Alexander's settlement provided the basis for Scottish claims to Nova Scotia, and his baronets provided the Coat of arms of Nova Scotia and Flag of Nova Scotia which are still in use today.

In 1624, William Alexander wrote in his Encouragement to Colonies, dedicated to Prince Charles, "these seeds of Scepters have been first from hence sowne in America", laying "the foundation of a Worke". He included the advice that colonisers should intermarry to form such "lawful alliances" that by "admitting equality remove contempt".

In 1630, King Charles rewarded his service by creating him Lord Alexander of Tullibody and Viscount of Stirling. Three years later, when Charles was crowned in Holyrood in 1633, he became Earl of Stirling and Viscount Canada, and Earl of Dovan in 1639.

=== Long Island ===
On 22 April 1636, Charles told the Plymouth Colony, which had laid claim to Long Island but had not settled it, to give the island to Alexander. Through his agent James Farret (who personally received Shelter Island and Robins Island), Alexander in turn sold most of the eastern island to the New Haven Colony and Connecticut Colony.

Farret arrived in New Amsterdam in 1637 to present his claim of English sovereignty but was arrested and sent to prison in Holland where he escaped. English colonists attempted to settle at Cow Bay at what today is Port Washington, New York in 1640, but after an alert by Native leader Penhawitz were arrested by the Dutch and released after saying they were mistaken about the title. After 1640, eastern Long Island was quickly settled by the English while the western portion remained under Dutch rule until 1674.

=== Death and succession ===
Alexander died in London on 12 February 1640. He was succeeded by his grandson William Alexander, 2nd Earl of Stirling (c. 1632 - May 1640), a child who himself died the same year. The 3rd Earl, Henry Alexander (died 1650), was the second son of William Alexander, the 1st Earl.

== Literary works ==
Alexander was one of the most highly regarded Scottish poets in early seventeenth-century Scotland and England: he was praised by William Drummond of Hawthornden, Arthur Johnstone, Andrew Ramsey, Michael Drayton, Samuel Daniel and John Davies of Hereford. Alexander's earliest work was probably Aurora (London, 1604), which was described on its title-page as 'the first fancies of the author's youth' and is a late addition to the corpus of Elizabethan Petrarchan sonnets. His closet dramas - Croesus, Darius, The Alexandrean, and Julius Caesar - were published together as The Monarchick Tragedies (London, 1604; further editions in 1607, 1616, 1637). According to Daniel Cadman, in these plays Alexander 'interrogates the value of republican forms of government and provides a voice for the frustrations of politically marginalised subjects of absolutist regimes'.

Alexander's grandest work is an epic poem describing the end of the world, Doomes-day. It was first published in four books (Edinburgh, 1614), and later in twelve (in the collected edition of Alexander's work printed in London, 1637). The poem, which contains almost 1,400 eight-line stanzas in total, begins with a synopsis of world history in the First 'Hour', then provides long catalogues of the creatures, battle dead, pagans, monarchs, sinners, biblical characters and, finally, members of the heavenly host who will appear at the Final Judgement. Alexander's method was indebted to the French Protestant poet Guillaume de Salluste Du Bartas; Drummond acknowledged the kinship in the title of a manuscript poem Sur les oeuvres poetiques de Guillaume Alexandre, Sieur De Menstre.

Alexander collaborated with James VI and I on a new paraphrase of the Psalms, composed a continuation to Philip Sidney's Arcadia that links the end of Book 3 in Sidney's incomplete revised version to the ending in the 1593 text, and also wrote down his thoughts on poetry in Anacrisis: Or a Censure of some Poets Ancient and Modern (c. 1635). Anacrisis begins with a reflection on the pleasure of literature:

After a great Travel both of Body and of Mind, which (since not voluntary but imposed upon me) was the more painful, by retiring for a Time where I was born [...] being curious, as the most dainty Kind of Pleasure for such as are capable of their Delicacies to recreate myself with the Muses,—I may justly say recreate, since they create new Spirits [...] I conversed with some of the Modern as well as with the Ancients, kindling my Fire at those Fires which do still burn out of the Ashes of ancient Authors.

This passage testifies to the value that Alexander placed on his literary pursuits (which mostly took place at his Menstrie estate) as an activity that was separate from but complementary to his public life as a politician and coloniser. Indeed, the phrase 'recreate myself with the Muses' re-appeared in the title of the collected edition of his works, Recreations with the Muses (1637).

== Legacy ==
The Canadian Coast Guard has named the CCGS Sir William Alexander in his honour.

Political offices
| Preceded by The Earl of Haddington | Secretary of State for Scotland; 1626–1640; With: Sir Archibald Acheson | Succeeded by The Duke of Hamilton |
Baronetage of Nova Scotia
| New creation | Baronet (of Menstre); 1625–1640 | Succeeded by William Alexander |
Peerage of Scotland
| New creation | Earl of Stirling; 1633–1640 | Succeeded by William Alexander |
| New creation | Earl of Dovan; 1639–1640 | Succeeded by William Alexander |
| New creation | Viscount of Stirling; 1630–1640 | Succeeded by William Alexander |
