= List of musicians at English cathedrals =

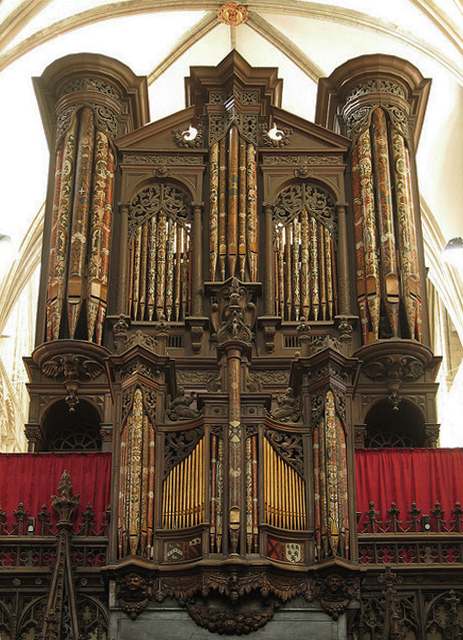
Pipe organ in Gloucester Cathedral. The case dates from 1579, the organ was rebuilt by Henry Willis (1874). It is located in its original position.

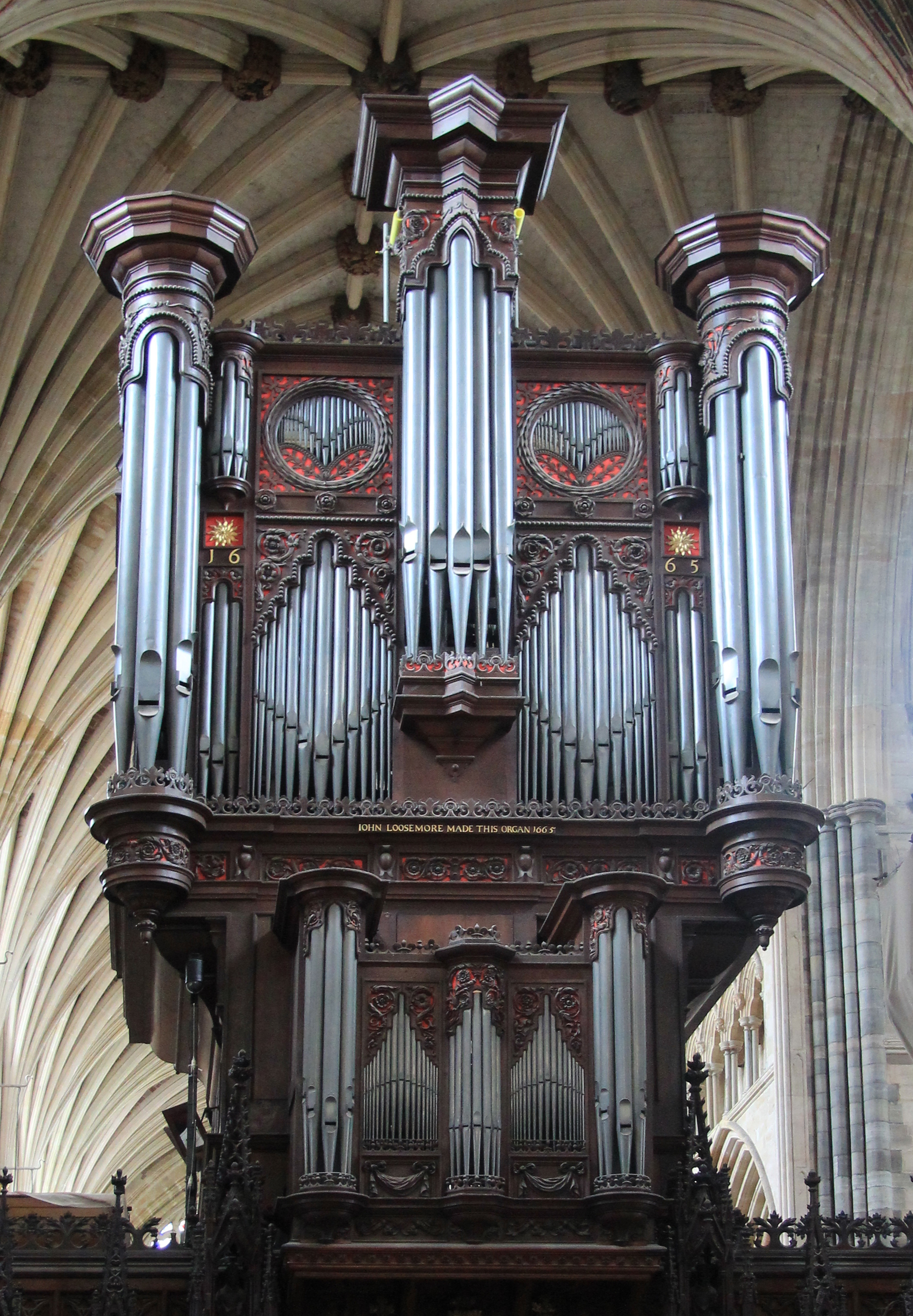
The organ of Exeter Cathedral is inscribed "John Loosemore made this organ, 1665".

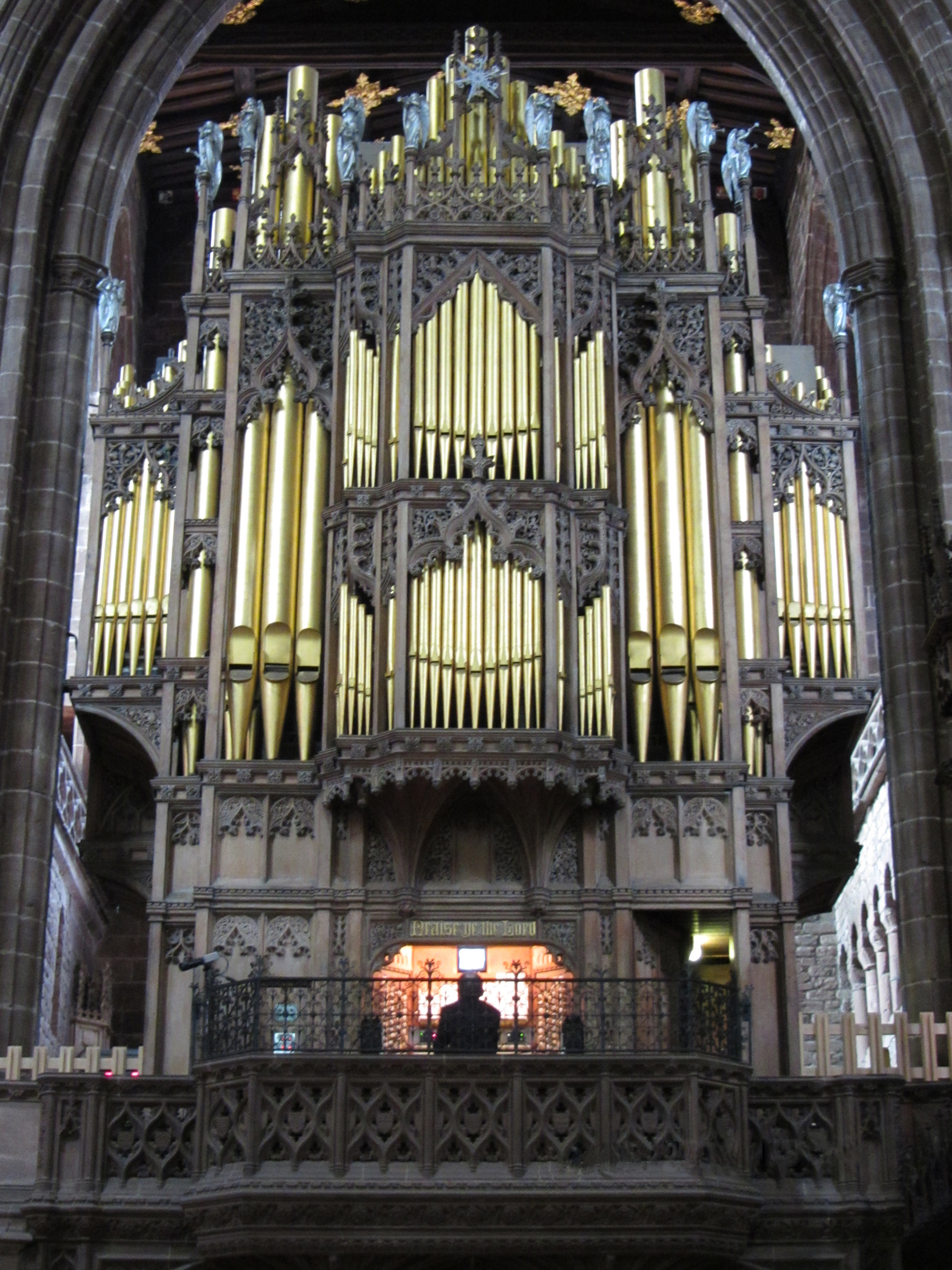
The pipe organ of Chester Cathedral

The following list contains information about organists at Church of England cathedrals in England.

The cathedrals of England have a long history of liturgical music, often played on or accompanied by the organ. The role of the cathedral organist is a salaried appointment, the organist often also serving as choirmaster. There is often also an assistant organist and an organ scholar.

== Birmingham, St Philip's Cathedral ==
Organists at St Philip's Cathedral, Birmingham have included composers Charles John Blood Meacham, Richard Yates Mander and Rupert Jeffcoat.

=== Directors of Music ===
- 1715 Barnabas Gunn
- 1733? William de St. Thunes
- 1735? John Ohio Eversman
- 1765 Jeremiah Clark (afterwards organist of Worcester Cathedral)
- 1803 Bishop Simms
- 1829 Henry Simms
- 1871 Charles John Blood Meacham (later organist of St George's Church, Edgbaston)
- 1888 Richard Yates Mander (later organist of All Saints' Church, Ryde)
- 1898 A. G. Thompson
- 1901 Arthur Elmore (later organist of St Mary the Virgin, Acocks Green)
- 1906 Edwin Stephenson (later organist of St Margaret's, Westminster)
- 1914 William Frederick Dunnill (formerly organist of St Mary's Church, Nottingham)
- 1936 Willis Grant (later professor of music, University of Bristol)
- 1958 Thomas Tunnard
- 1968 Roy Massey (later organist of Hereford Cathedral)
- 1974 David Bruce-Payne
- 1978 Hubert Best
- 1986 Marcus Huxley
- 2018 David Hardie (Head of Music)

=== Assistant Organists ===
- 1907–1914 T. Appleby Matthews
- 1950–1951 Harrison Oxley (later Organist of St Edmundsbury Cathedral)
- 1954–1956 John K. Nicholas
- Malcolm Hicks
- 1966–1968 Roland L. Keen (later Director of Music at Wroxall Abbey School)
- 1968–1974 John Pryer
- Hubert Best (later Organist)
- 1978–1979 Gary Cole
- Timothy Storey
- 1986–1995 Rosemary Field
- 1995–1997 Rupert Jeffcoat (later Director of Music at Coventry Cathedral and St John's Cathedral, Brisbane)
- 1997–2004 Christopher Allsop (later Assistant Organist at Worcester Cathedral and Organist at Eton College)
- 2004–2010 Stuart Nicholson (later Organist and Master of Choristers at St Patrick's Cathedral, Dublin)
- 2010–2014 Tim Harper
- 2014–2018 David Hardie (later Head of Music, Birmingham Cathedral)
- 2019– Ashley Wagner (Assistant Head of Music)

== Blackburn Cathedral ==
Notable organists at Blackburn Cathedral have included Charles Hylton Stewart, John Bertalot and Gordon Stewart.

=== Directors of Music ===
- 1828–1831 Joseph John Harris (later organist of Manchester Cathedral)
- 1832 R. Nimmo (temporary)
- 1832–1838 Henry Smart
- 1838–1840 John Bishop (formerly organist of St. Paul's Church, Cheltenham)
- 1840–1848 William Robinson
- 1848–1858 Joseph Rolley (from Church of St George, Bolton)
- 1858–1863 Charles Greenwood
- 1863–1870 James H. Robinson
- 1870–1882 Thomas S. Hayward (previously organist of St Peter's Collegiate Church Wolverhampton, afterwards organist of Wesleyan Chapel, Mornington Road, Southport)
- 1882–1888 Walter Handel Thorley
- 1888–1900 James H. Rooks
- 1900–1912 Christie Green (afterwards organist of Holy Trinity Church, Coventry)
- 1912–1914 Richard Henry Coleman
- 1914–1916 Charles Hylton Stewart (afterwards organist of Rochester Cathedral and St George's Chapel, Windsor)
- 1916–1939 Herman Brearley
- 1939–1964 Thomas Lucas Duerden
- 1964–1983 John Bertalot
- 1983–1994 David Anthony Cooper
- 1994–1998 Gordon Stewart
- 1998–2011 Richard Tanner (from All Saints' Church, Northampton)
- 2011–2019 Samuel Hudson
- 2019– John Robinson

=== Organist in Residence ===
- 2022-2025 John Hosking (formerly Director of Music, Holy Trinity, Southport)

=== Assistant Directors of Music ===
- Justin Waters
- James Thomas
- Benjamin Saunders
- Robert Costin
- David Goodenough
- Tim Cooke
- 2000–2006 Greg Morris
- 2006–2012 James Davy
- 2012–2021 Shaun Turnbull

== Bradford Cathedral ==
Organists at Bradford Cathedral have included the following.

=== Organist and Master of the Choristers ===
- c1861–1893 Absalom Rawnsley Swaine
- 1893–1939 Henry Coates
- 1939–1963 Charles Hooper
- 1963–1981 Keith Vernon Rhodes
- 1982–1986 Geoffrey John Weaver
- 1986–2002 Alan Graham Horsey
- 2003–2011 Andrew Teague

=== Organist & Director of Music ===
- 2012–2016 Alexander Woodrow
- 2017–2023 Alexander Berry
- 2023-2025 Graham Thorpe (later Assistant Master of Music at Norwich Cathedral)
- 2025- Geoffrey Woollatt

=== Cathedral Organist ===
- 2011–2014 Paul Bowen

=== Sub-Organist & Assistant Director of Music ===
- 1957-1960 Charles Edmondson
- 1970-1976 Brian Tetley
- 1976-1979 Barry Lancaster
- 1979 Jonathan Newell (acting)
- 1980 Neil Maddox
- 1984-2004 Martin Derek Baker
- 1997-2000 Jonathan Kingston
- 2004-2011 Paul Bowen
- 2009-2012 David Condry
- 2012-2016 Jonathan Eyre
- 2016-2018 Jon Payne
- 2019-2023 Graham Thorpe
- 2023-2024 Anthony Gray
- 2025-2026 William Campbell (later Assistant Director of Music at Peterborough Cathedral)

=== Associate Organist ===
- 2018–2019 Ed Jones

== Bristol Cathedral ==
Organists at Bristol Cathedral have included the writer and composer Percy Buck and the conductor Malcolm Archer.

=== Organists ===
- 1542 Thomas Denny
- 1588 Elway Bevin
- 1638 Arthur Phillips
- 1639 Thomas Deane
- 1680 Paul Heath
- 1724 Nathaniel Priest
- 1734 James Morley
- 1756 George Coombes
- 1759 Edward Higgins
- 1765 George Coombes
- 1769 Edward Rooke
- 1773 Samuel Mineard
- 1778 Richard Langdon
- 1781 Rice Wasbrough
- 1825 John Davies Corfe
- 1876 George Riseley
- 1899 Percy Carter Buck
- 1901 Hubert Hunt
- 1946 Reginald Alwyn Surplice
- 1949 Clifford Harker
- 1983 Malcolm Archer
- 1990 Christopher Brayne
- 1998 Mark Lee

=== Assistant Organists ===
- 1856–1860 John Barrett
- 1862–1876 George Riseley
- Albert Edward New
- 1888–1892 J.H. Fulford
- 1902 Arthur S. Warrell
- 1920–1941 Geoffrey Leonard Mendham
- 1956-1959 Lionel Pike
- Stephen Taylor
- John Jenkin
- 1980–1986 Martin Schellenberg (later Director of Music of Christchurch Priory)
- 1986–1989 Tony Pinel
- 1989–1991 Claire Hobbs
- 1991–1994 Ian Ball
- 1994–2001 David Hobourn
- 2001– Paul Walton

== Canterbury Cathedral ==
Organists and Assistant Organists at Canterbury Cathedral have included composers Clement Charlton Palmer, Gerald Hocken Knight and Philip Moore and musical directors Sidney Campbell, Allan Wicks and Stephen Darlington.

=== Organists ===
- 1407 John Mounds
- 1420 William Stanys
- 1445 John Cranbroke
- 1499 Thomas Seawall
- 1534 John Wodynsborowe
- 1547 William Shelbye (aka Selby)
- 1553 Thomas Bull
- 1564 William Shelbye
- 1583 Matthew Godwin
- 1590 Thomas Stores
- 1598 George Marson
- 1631 Valentine Rother
- 1640 Thomas Tunstall
- 1661 Thomas Gibbes
- 1669 Richard Chomley
- 1692 Nicholas Wotton
- 1697 William Porter
- 1698 Daniel Henstridge
- 1736 William Raylton
- 1757 Samuel Porter
- 1803 Highmore Skeats
- 1831 Thomas Evance Jones
- 1873 William Henry Longhurst
- 1898 Harry Crane Perrin
- 1908 Clement Charlton Palmer
- 1937 Gerald Hocken Knight
- 1953 Douglas Edward Hopkins
- 1956 Sidney Campbell
- 1961 Allan Wicks
- 1988 David Flood
- 2020 David Newsholme (acting)
- 2021 David Newsholme

=== Assistant Organists ===
- 1836 William Henry Longhurst
- 1873 John Browning Lott
- 1875 Yoku Myles Bossman
- 1884 Herbert Austin Fricker
- 1892 J. Sterndale Grundy
- 1906 W. T. Harvey
- 1909 Frank Charles Butcher
- 1918 Rene Soames
- 1926 ?
- 1936 Henry Frank Cole
- 1938 ?
- 1953 John Malcolm Tyler
- 1956 Gwilym Isaac
- 1964 Stephen Crisp
- 1968 Philip Moore
- 1974 Stephen Darlington
- 1978 David Flood
- 1986 Michael Harris
- 1997 Timothy Noon
- 2001 Matthew Martin
- 2005 Robert Patterson
- 2008 John Robinson
- 2010 Simon Lawford (acting)
- 2011 David Newsholme
- 2020 Adrian Bawtree (acting)
- 2022 Jamie Rogers

=== Second Assistant Organists ===
- 2015 Adrian Bawtree
- 2020 Jamie Rogers (acting)
- 2022 Adrian Bawtree
- 2022 Robin Walker

== Carlisle Cathedral ==
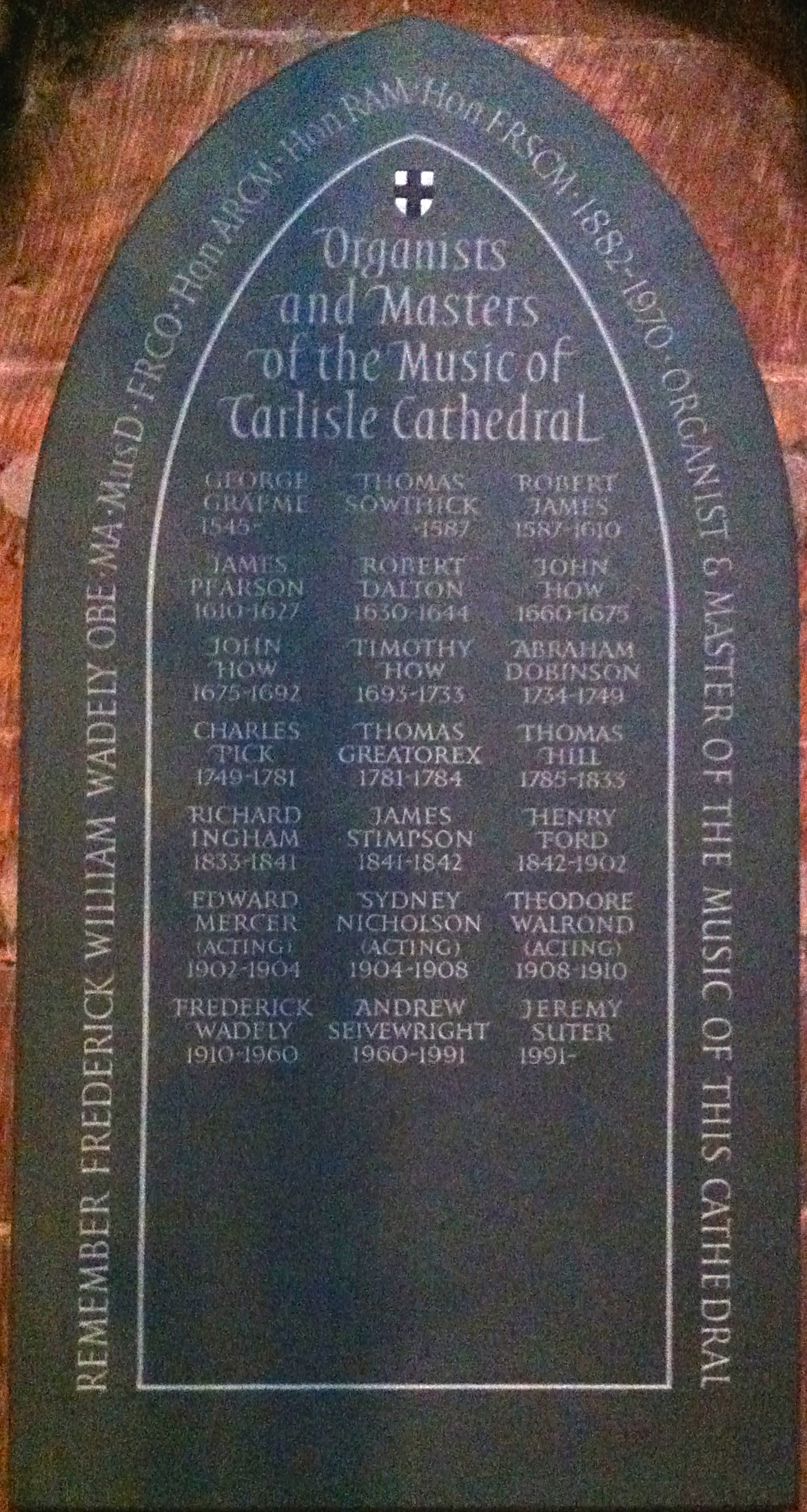
Plaque in Carlisle Cathedral

Notable organists at Carlisle Cathedral have included the composer, astronomer and mathematician Thomas Greatorex and founder of the Royal School of Church Music, Sir Sydney Nicholson.

=== Organists ===
- 1560 Thomas Southick
- 1587 Robert James
- 1610 James Pearson
- 1630 Robert Dalton
- 1663 John How
- 1693 Timothy How
- 1734 Abraham Dobinson
- 1749 Charles Pick
- 1781 Thomas Greatorex (later organist at Westminster Abbey).
- 1785 Thomas Hill
- 1833 Richard Ingham
- 1841 James Stimpson (later Birmingham City Organist and organist of St Martin in the Bull Ring, Birmingham)
- 1842 Henry Edmund Ford
- 1903 E. G. Mercer (acting)
- 1904 Sydney Nicholson (acting)(later Sir Sydney Nicholson organist of Westminster Abbey and founder of the Royal School of Church Music)
- 1910 Frederick William Wadely
- 1960 Robert Andrew Seivewright
- 1991 Jeremy Suter
- 2017-2026 Mark Duthie
- 2026 Ian Wicks (acting)

=== Assistant Organists ===
- 1900–1902 Stanley G. P. Stubbs (later Acting Organist)
- 1915–1919 Charles Frederick Eastwood
- 1932–1934 G. F. Stuart
- 1940–1945 Keith Burton-Nickson
- William L. Snowdon
- Ifor James
- 1970–1973 Christopher Rathbone
- 1974–1985 Hugh Davies
- 1985–1987 Andrew Shaw
- 1987–1989 Andrew Sackett
- 1989–1995 Ian Hare
- 1995–1999 Charles Harrison (later organist of Chichester Cathedral)
- 2000–2005 David Gibbs
- 2005–2008 John Robinson (Organist and Choir Director)
- 2008–present Edward Taylor (formerly Assistant Organist to Ely Cathedral Girls' Choir)

== Chelmsford Cathedral ==
Notable organists at Chelmsford Cathedral have included Stanley Vann and Philip Ledger.

=== Masters of the Music ===
- 182? Charles Ambrose
- 1876 Frederick Frye
- 1945 Roland Middleton (later Organist of Chester Cathedral)
- 1949 Stanley Vann (later Master of the Music at Peterborough Cathedral)
- 1953 Derrick Edward Cantrell (later Organist of Manchester Cathedral)
- 1962 Philip Ledger (later Director of Music at King's College, Cambridge)
- 1965 John Willam Jordan
- 1981 Graham Elliott
- 1999 Peter Nardone (later Organist and Director of Music at Worcester Cathedral)
- 2012 James Davy [job title changed to Organist and Master of the Choristers in 2013]
- 2023 Thomas Corns (Interim Director of Music)
- 2024 Emma Gibbins

=== Assistant Organists ===
- Geoffrey Becket
- 1963 John Jordan
- 1966 Peter Cross
- 1968 David Sparrow
- 1986 Timothy Allen
- 1991 Neil Weston

=== Assistant Directors of Music ===
- 1999 Edward Wellman
- 2003 Robert Poyser (later Director of Music at Beverley Minster)
- 2008 Tom Wilkinson (later Organist at the University of St Andrews, Scotland)
- 2009 Oliver Waterer (later Organist at St. Davids Cathedral and Selby Abbey)
- 2013 Laurence Lyndon-Jones
- 2019 Hilary Punnett
- 2023 Samuel Bristow

== Chester Cathedral ==
Notable organists of Chester Cathedral include the composers Robert White and John Sanders and the recording artist Roger Fisher.

=== Organists ===
- 1541 John Brycheley
- 1551 Thomas Barnes
- 1558 Richard Saywell
- 1567 Robert White
- 1570 Robert Stevenson
- 1599 Thomas Bateson
- 1609 John Alien
- 1613 Michael Done
- 1614 Thomas Jones
- 1637 Richard Newbold
- 1642 Randolph Jewitt
- 1661 Rev. Peter Stringer
- 1673 John Stringer
- 1686 William Key
- 1699 John Mounterratt
- 1705 Edmund White
- 1715 Samuel Davies
- 1726 Benjamin Worrall
- 1727 Edmund Baker
- 1765 Edward Orme
- 1776 John Bailey
- 1803 Edward Bailey
- 1823 George Black
- 1824 Thomas Haylett
- 1841 Frederick Gunton
- 1877 Joseph Cox Bridge
- 1925 John Thomas Hughes
- 1930 Charles Hylton Stewart
- 1932 Malcolm Courtenay Boyle
- 1949 James Roland Middleton
- 1964 John Sanders
- 1967 Roger Fisher
- 1997 David Poulter
- 2008 Philip Rushforth

=== Assistant Organists ===
- 1857 Mr. Munns
- 1872–1876 Herbert Stephen Irons
- 1876–1877 Joseph Cox Bridge (then organist)
- ????–1890 John Gumi
- 1893–1925 John Thomas Hughes (then organist)
- 1925–1926 Guillaume Ormond (later organist of Truro Cathedral)
- 1934–1944 James Roland Middleton (later organist of Chelmsford Cathedral)
- 1944–1947 George Guest (later organist of St John's College, Cambridge)
- 1955–1960 Brian Runnett (later organist of Norwich Cathedral)
- 1960–1962 Peter Gilbert White
- 1962–1967 Harold Hullah
- 1967–1971 John Belcher
- 1971–1974 John Cooper Green
- 1974-1976 Gwyn Hodgson
- 1976–1978 John Keys
- 1978–1980 Simon Russell
- 1980–1984 Martin Singleton
- 1984–1986 David Holroyd
- 1986–1989 Lee Ward
- 1989–1998 Graham Eccles
- 1998–2002 Benjamin Saunders
- 2003–2008 Philip Rushforth (later organist)
- 2008–2011 Ian Roberts
- 2011–2016 Benjamin Chewter
- 2016–2020 Andrew Wyatt
- 2020 – present Alexander Lanigan-Palotai
- 2023 – present Daniel Mathieson

== Chichester Cathedral ==
Notable organists at Chichester Cathedral have included composer Thomas Weelkes and conductors John Birch and Nicholas Cleobury.

Until 1801, there were two distinct posts, 'Organist' and 'Master of the Choristers', which were merged upon the appointment of James Target. Since the mid-nineteenth century, there has existed the role of Assistant Organist. Currently, the 'Organist and Master of the Choristers' is responsible for the direction of the choir and cathedral liturgy, and the 'Assistant Organist' accompanies the choir.

The sacking of Chichester Cathedral in December 1642 caused all cathedral services to be suspended. They were not resumed until the restoration of the monarchy in 1661. The choir was re-formed in the same year, but the appointment of a new organist did not occur until 1668.

=== Organists and Masters of the Choristers ===
Organist (1545–1801)

- 1545 William Campion
- 1550 Thomas Coring
- 1560 Edward Piper
- 1561 Thomas Coring
- 1565 Michael Woods
- 1571 Clement Woodcock
- 1589 ?
- 1599 Jacob Hillarye
- 1602 Thomas Weelkes
- 1623 William Eames
- 1636 Thomas Lewis
- 1642 None (Note: The sacking of the cathedral in December 1642 caused all cathedral services to be suspended. They were not resumed until the restoration of the monarchy in 1661. The choir was re-formed in the same year, but the appointment of a new organist did not occur until 1668)
- 1668 Bartholomew Webb
- 1673 Thomas Lewis
- 1675 John Reading
- 1677 Samuel Peirson
- 1720 Thomas Kelway
- 1744 Thomas Capell
- 1776 William Walond Jr.

Master of the Choristers (1550s – 1801)

- 155? Richard Martyn
- 1558 William Payne
- 1562 Edward Piper
- 1568 William Payne
- 1571 Clement Woodcock
- 1580 Christopher Paine
- 1589 Clement Woodcock
- 1590 John Cowper
- 1597 Thomas Lambert
- 1599 Jacob Hillarye
- 1602 Thomas Weelkes
- 1617 John Fidge
- 1642 None
- 1661 John Floud
- 1662 George Hush
- 1668 Bartholomew Webb
- 1673 John Turner
- 1675 John Reading
- 1677 ?
- 1732 Thomas Capell
- 1771 Thomas Tremain
- 1775 William Walond Jr.
- 1794 Thomas Barber

Organist and Master of the Choristers (1801 – present)

- 1801 James Target
- 1803 Thomas Bennett
- 1848 Henry R. Bennett
- 1861 Philip Armes
- 1863 Edward Thorne
- 1870 Francis Edward Gladstone
- 1873 James Pyne
- 1874 Charles Henry Hylton Stewart
- 1875 Daniel Wood
- 1876 Theodore Aylward
- 1887 Frederick Read
- 1902 Frederick Crowe
- 1921 Frederick Read
- 1925 Marmaduke Conway
- 1931 Harvey Grace
- 1938 Horace Hawkins
- 1958 John Birch
- 1980 Alan Thurlow
- 2008 Sarah Baldock
- 2014 Charles Harrison

=== Assistant Organists ===
- 18?? Wharton Hooper
- 1864 ?
- 1876 Edward Bartlett
- 1887 Hugh Percy Allen
- 1892 Percy Algernon Whitehead
- 1908 William Herbert H. Lambert
- 1911 R. Swanborough
- 1915 Cyril Herbert Stone
- 1920 ?
- 1931 John Edward Snelling-Colyer
- 1932 Leonard Fergus O’Connor
- 1936 Claude Appleby
- 1942 Anne Maddocks
- 1949 ?
- 1961 Richard Seal
- 1968 Michael Davey
- 1971 Nicholas Cleobury
- 1973 Ian Fox
- 1978 Richard Cock
- 1980 Kenneth Sweetman
- 1981 Jeremy Suter
- 1991 James Thomas
- 1997 Mark Wardell
- 2010 Timothy Ravalde

=== Precentors ===
- 1899–1918 John Henry Mee

== Coventry Cathedral ==
This list details only those who have held positions in the new Coventry Cathedral.

=== Directors of Music ===
- 1961 David Foster Lepine
- 1972 Robert Weddle
- 1977 Ian Little
- 1984 Paul Leddington Wright
- 1995 David Poulter (subsequently Organist of Chester Cathedral and Director of Music at Liverpool Cathedral)
- 1997 Rupert Jeffcoat (subsequently Director of Music and Organist at St John's Cathedral (Brisbane))
- 2005 Alistair Reid (Acting Director of Music)
- 2006 Kerry Beaumont
- 2020– Rachel Mahon

=== Assistant Organists (Assistant Director of Music) ===
- 1960 Martyn Lane
- 1962 Michael Burnett
- 1964 Robert George Weddle (then Organist)
- 1972 J Richard Lowry
- 1976 Ian Little (then Organist)
- 1977 Paul Leddington Wright (then Organist)
- 1984 Timothy Hone
- 1988 Chris Argent (then Shrewsbury School)
- 1990 David Poulter (then Director of Music; later Director of Music at Liverpool Cathedral)
- 1995–2002 Daniel Moult
- 2004 Alistair Reid
- 2011–2013 Laurence Lyndon-Jones (to Chelmsford Cathedral)
- 2018–2020 Rachel Mahon (then Director of Music)
- 2020-2025 Luke Fitzgerald
- since 2025 Liam Condon

== Derby Cathedral ==
Notable organists at Derby Cathedral have included Arthur Claypole and Wallace Ross.

=== Organists ===
- 1921 Arthur Griffin Claypole
- 1930 Alfred William Wilcock
- 1933 George Handel Heath-Gracie
- 1958 Wallace Michael Ross
- 1983 Peter David Gould
- 2015 Hugh Morris
- 2019 Alexander Binns

=== Assistant Organists ===
- (Alfred) Samuel (Wensley) Baker
- Celyn Kingsbury
- Rodney Tomkins
- 1985 Tom Corfield
- 2017 Edward Turner

== Durham Cathedral ==
Notable organists at Durham Cathedral have included the composers Thomas Ebdon and Richard Lloyd, organists Philip Armes, John Dykes Bower who went on to St Paul's Cathedral, London, Conrad William Eden and James Lancelot, and choral conductor David Hill.

=== Organists ===
- 1557 John Brimley
- 1576 William Browne
- 1588 Robert Masterman
- 1594 William Smyth
- 1599 William Browne
- 1609 Edward Smyth
- 1612 Mr Dodson
- 1614 Richard Hutchinson
- 1661 John Foster
- 1677 Alexander Shaw
- 1681 William Greggs
- 1710 James Heseltine
- 1763 Thomas Ebdon
- 1811 Charles E. J. Clarke
- 1813 William Henshaw
- 1862 Philip Armes
- 1907 Rev Arnold D. Culley
- 1933 John Dykes Bower
- 1936 Conrad William Eden
- 1974 Richard Lloyd
- 1985 James Lancelot
- 2017 Daniel Cook

=== Sub-Organists ===
- 1843–1850 John Matthew Wilson Young, (later organist of Lincoln Cathedral)
- ???? - 1853 George Freemantle (afterwards organist at Henshaw’s Blind Asylum, Manchester)
- ca. 1854 James Vasey
- ca. 1865 Henry Leslie
- 1865-1867 G.H.F. Orwin
- ca. 1867 Mr Owen
- ????–1874 J. C. Whitehead
- 1876-1878 Thomas Henry Collinson (afterwards organist at St Mary's Cathedral, Edinburgh)
- 1876-1880 George Cummings Dawson (later organist of St Andrew's Church, Aberdeen)
- ca. 1881 Mr. Reveley
- ????-1885 Robert William Liddle (later organist at Southwell Minster)
- ca. 1888 Mr. Ellinson (afterwards organist at Holy Trinity Stockton, then Buenos Aires)
- ????-1890 Joseph Walker
- 1895–1903 Revd John Lionel Shirley Dampier Bennett
- 1901 F. E. Leatham, 1 (temporary during absence of J. L. Bennett)
- 1903–1918 William Ellis, (later organist of Newcastle Cathedral)
- 1918–1919 Basil S. Maine
- 1919–1968 Cyril Beaumont Maude
- 1968–1972 Bruce Richard Cash
- 1973–1980 Alan Thurlow (later Organist Chichester Cathedral)
- 1980–1982 David Hill (later successively Organist and Director of Music at Westminster Cathedral, Winchester Cathedral, St John's College, Cambridge and Director of the Bach Choir)
- 1982–1991 Ian Shaw
- 1991 Ralph Woodward (Acting)
- 1991–2011 Keith Wright
- 2011–2019 Francesca Massey
- 2019–present Joseph Beech

=== Assistant Organists ===
- 2009–2011 Oliver Brett
- 2011–2015 David Ratnanayagam

== Ely Cathedral ==
Organists of Ely Cathedral have included the composers Basil Harwood and Arthur Wills.

=== Organists ===
- 1453 William Kyng
- 1535 Thomas Barcroft
- 1541 Christopher Tye
- 1562 Robert White
- 1567 John Farrant (later organist of Salisbury Cathedral)
- 1572 William Fox
- 1579 George Barcroft
- 1610 John Amner
- 1641 Robert Claxton
- 1662 John Ferrabosco
- 1681 James Hawkins
- 1729 Thomas Kempton
- 1762 John Elbonn
- 1768 David Wood
- 1774 James Rogers
- 1777 Richard Langdon
- 1778 Highmore Skeats (sen.)
- 1804 Highmore Skeats (jun.)
- 1830 Robert Janes
- 1867 Edmund Thomas Chipp
- 1887 Basil Harwood
- 1892 Thomas Tertius Noble
- 1898 Hugh Allen
- 1901 Archibald Wilson
- 1919 Noel Ponsonby
- 1926 Hubert Stanley Middleton
- 1931 Marmaduke Conway
- 1949 Sidney Campbell
- 1953 Michael Howard
- 1958 Arthur Wills
- 1990 Paul Trepte
- 2019 Edmund Aldhouse

=== Assistant Organists ===
- ????-1857 Mr. Bailey (afterwards organist of Holy Trinity Church, Coventry)
- ????-1865 William J. Kempton
- George Legge
- William George Price (later organist to the City of Melbourne)
- 1903–1906 Frederick Chubb
- 1906–1909 Harold Carpenter Lumb Stocks
- 1911–1915 Edwin Alec Collins
- 1927–1929 Guillaume Ormond(afterwards organist of Truro Cathedral)
- William Bean
- 1939 C. P. R. Wilson
- 1945–1949 Russell Missin
- 1949–1958 Arthur Wills (later organist)
- 1958–1961 Christopher Scarf
- 1961–1964 Michael Dudman
- 1964–1966 Anthony Greening
- 1968–1972 Roger Judd (afterwards Master of the Music at St Michael's College, Tenbury)
- 1973–1976 Gerald Gifford
- 1977–1989 Stephen Le Prevost
- 1989–1991 Jeremy Filsell
- 1991–1996 David Price (now organist at Portsmouth Cathedral)
- 1996–1998 Sean Farrell
- 1999–2002 Scott Farrell
- 2002 Jonathan Lilley (now Director of Music at Waltham Abbey)
- 2013 Edmund Aldhouse
- 2019 Glen Dempsey
- 2024 Jeremy Lloyd

=== Directors of the Girl Choristers ===
- 2006–2008 Louise Reid
- 2008 Sarah MacDonald
- 2009–2010 Louise Reid
- 2010–present Sarah MacDonald

=== Assistant Organists of the Girls' Choir/Graduate Organ Scholars ===
- 2006–2008 Edward Taylor (now Assistant Organist at Carlisle Cathedral)
- 2008–2012 Oliver Hancock (now Director of Music at St Mary's Warwick)
- 2012–2014 Alexander Berry (now Director of Music at Great St Mary's, Cambridge)
- 2015–2017 Alexander Goodwin (now at St John's School Leatherhead as Head of Music Performance & Choral Music)
- 2017–2021 Aaron Shilson (now Assistant Director of Music at Llandaff Cathedral)
- 2021–2023 Jack Wilson (Graduate Organ Scholar, now Organist and Master of Music at Belfast Cathedral)
- 2023–2025 Stanley Godfrey (now Organist & Assistant Director of Music at Great St Mary's, Cambridge)
- 2025–present Andrew Liu

== Exeter Cathedral ==
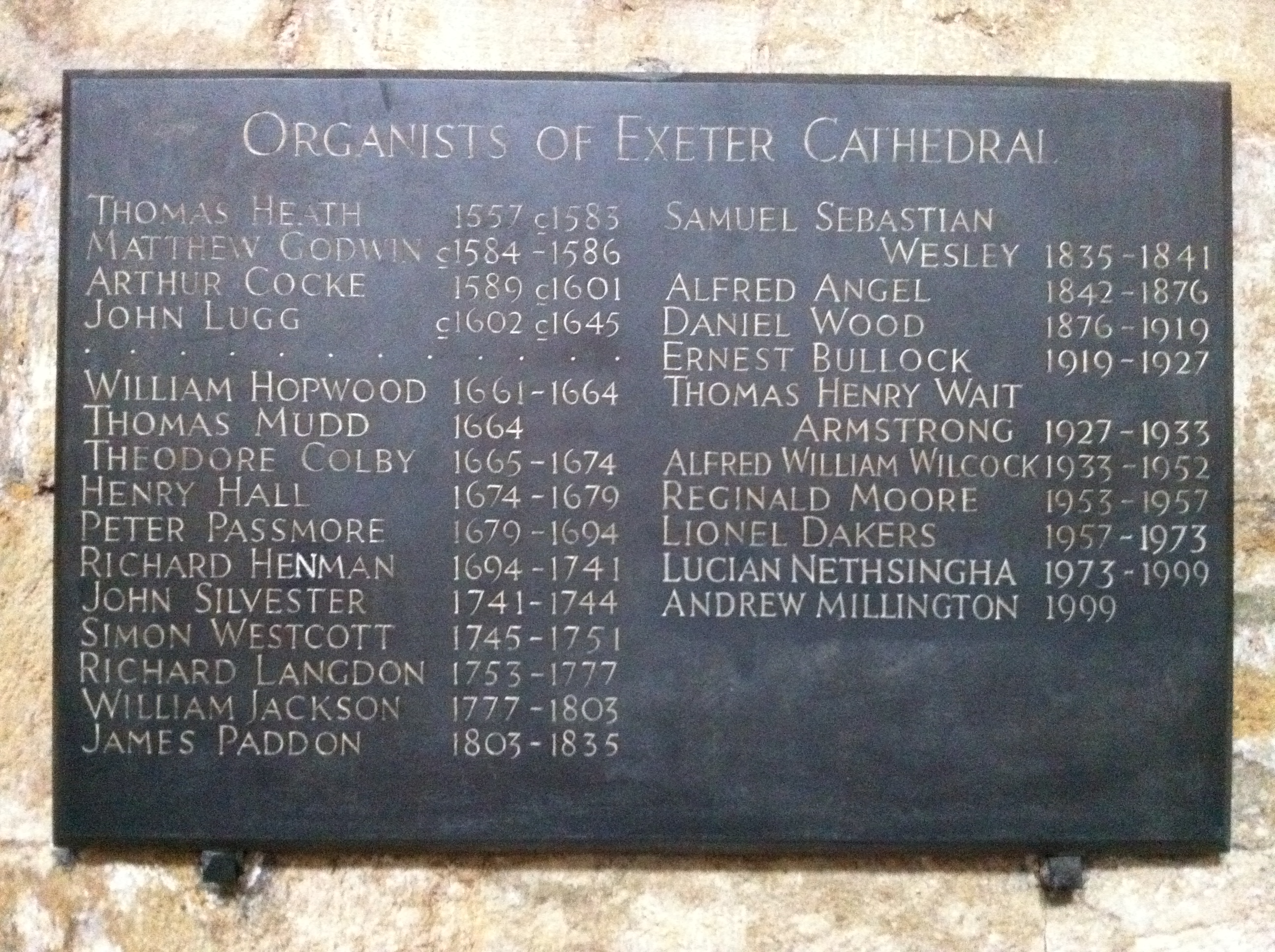
List of the organists of Exeter Cathedral

Notable organists at Exeter Cathedral include composer and hymn writer Samuel Sebastian Wesley, educator Sir Ernest Bullock and conductor Sir Thomas Armstrong.

=== Organists / Directors of Music ===
- 1586 Matthew Godwin
- 1591 Arthur Cocke
- 1609 John Lugge
- 1665 Theodore Coleby
- 1674 Henry Hall
- 1686 Peter Passmore and John White
- 1693 Richard Henman
- 1741 John Silvester
- 1753 Richard Langdon
- 1777 William Jackson
- 1804 James Paddon
- 1835 Samuel Sebastian Wesley
- 1842 Alfred Angel
- 1876 Daniel Joseph Wood
- 1919 Ernest Bullock (later knighted, and Organist of Westminster Abbey)
- 1928 Thomas Armstrong (later knighted, and Principal of the Royal Academy of Music)
- 1933 Alfred William Wilcock
- 1953 Reginald Moore
- 1957 Lionel Frederick Dakers (later Director of the Royal School of Church Music)
- 1973 Lucian Nethsingha
- 1999 Andrew Millington
- 2016 Timothy Noon

=== Assistant Organists (Organist from 1999) ===
- 1856 H. G. Halfyard
- 1861–1870 W. Pinney
- 1861?–1868 Graham Clarke (later organist of St Andrew's, Plymouth)
- ????–1880? Edward Ellis Vinnicombe
- 1881–1889 Ernest Slater
- Frederick Gandy Bradford
- ????–1898 Walter Hoyle (later organist of Coventry Cathedral)
- 1900–1906 Revd Arnold Duncan Culley
- 1906–1918 F. J. Pinn
- 1919–1927 Ernest Bullock (later organist here, subsequently knighted and Organist of Westminster Abbey)
- 1929–1937 William Harry Gabb (later Organist of H.M. Chapels Royal & Sub Organist at St Paul's Cathedral, London)
- 1937–1940 John Norman Hind
- 1945–1946 John Norman Hind
- 1946– Edgar S. Landen
- 1950–1955 Howard Stephens
- 1956–1961 Stuart Marston Smith
- 1961–1969 Christopher Gower (later Master of the Music at Peterborough Cathedral)
- 1969–2010 Paul Morgan (titled 'Organist' in 1999)

=== Assistant Directors of Music ===
- 2010 David Davies
- 2016 Timothy Parsons
- 2021 James Anderson-Besant
- 2023 Michael Stephens-Jones

=== Assistant Organists ===
- 1994–2016 Stephen Tanner (Assistant Organist)

== Gloucester Cathedral ==
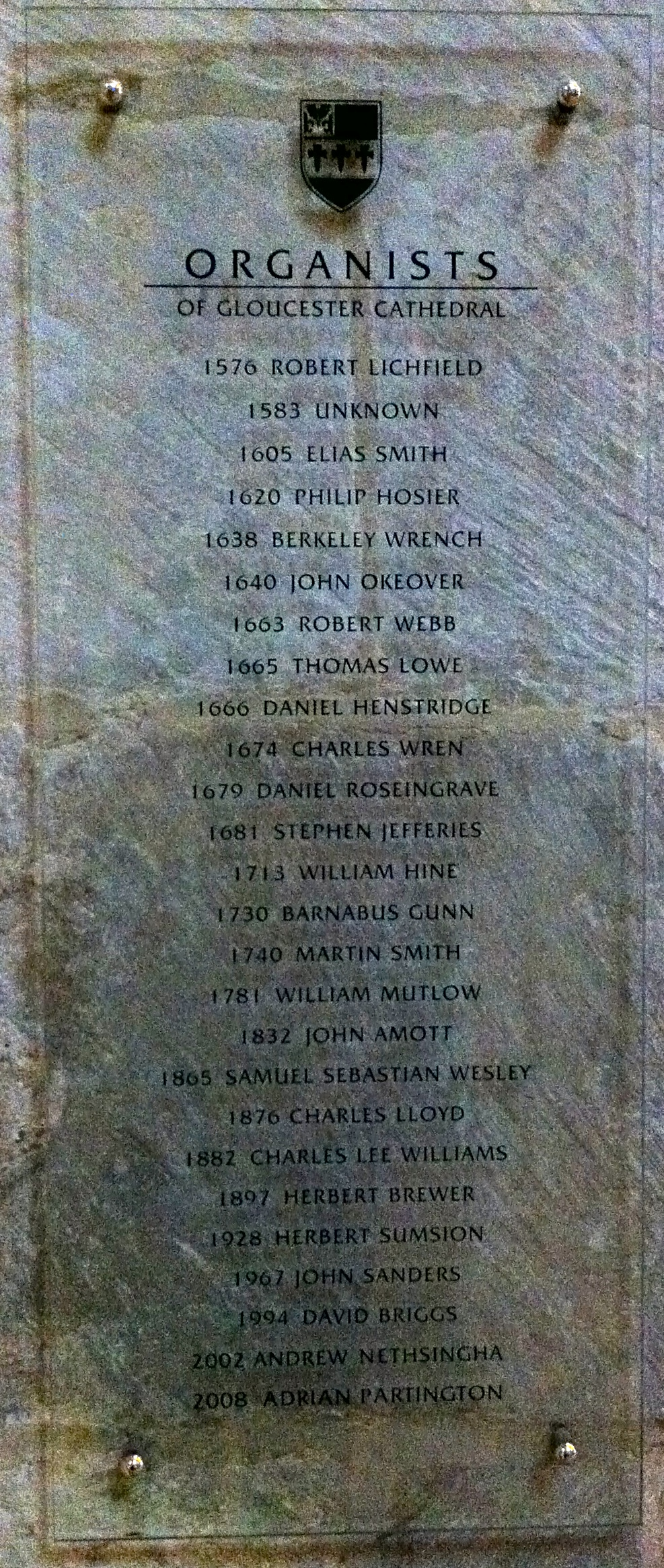
List of organists at Gloucester Cathedral

Notable among the organists of Gloucester Cathedral are Samuel Sebastian Wesley (his final cathedral appointment) and composers and choral conductors of the Three Choirs Festival, Sir Arthur Herbert Brewer, Herbert Sumsion and John Sanders.

=== Organists ===
The known organists of the cathedral are listed below. In modern times, the most senior post has become known as Director of Music; only these names are recorded here.

- 1582 Robert Lichfield
- 1620 Elias Smith
- 1620 Philip Hosier
- 1638 Berkeley Wrench
- 1640 John Okeover
- 1662 Robert Webb
- 1665 Thomas Lowe
- 1666 Daniel Henstridge
- 1673 Charles Wren
- 1679 Daniel Roseingrave
- 1682 Stephen Jeffries
- 1710 William Hine
- 1730 Barnabas Gunn
- 1743 Martin Smith
- 1782 William Mutlow
- 1832 John Amott
- 1865 Samuel Sebastian Wesley
- 1876 Charles Harford Lloyd
- 1882 Charles Lee Williams
- 1897 Herbert Brewer
- 1928 Herbert Sumsion
- 1967 John Sanders
- 1994 David Briggs
- 2002 Andrew Nethsingha
- 2007 Adrian Partington

=== Assistant Organists ===
- 1701–1710 William Hine (later organist of Gloucester Cathedral)
- Walter Brooks
- 1862–1865 John Alexander Matthews
- ????-1873 Henry John Vaughan
- 1879–1880 George Robertson Sinclair (later organist at Truro Cathedral and Hereford Cathedral)
- 1880–1882 A. Herbert Brewer
- George Washbourn Morgan
- James Capener
- 1896 A. Herbert Brewer (later organist of Gloucester Cathedral)
- 1898-1900-???? Ivor Morgan
- ????-1906 S.W. Underwood (afterwards organist at Stroud parish church)
- 1907–1913 Ambrose Robert Porter (later organist of Lichfield Cathedral)
- 1915–???? Harold C. Organ
- ca. 1919 Charles Williams
- 1920–1926 Reginald Tustin Baker (later organist of Sheffield Cathedral)
- 1926-1917 William O Minay (later organist of Wigan Parish Church)
- 1927–1932 Arthur John Pritchard
- 1932–1937 (Alfred) Melville Cook (later organist of Hereford Cathedral)
- 1938 W. Lugg
- ????-1945 Herbert William Byard
- Peter Stuart Rodway
- 1948–1954 Donald Frederick Hunt (later organist of Worcester Cathedral)
- 1954–1958 Wallace Michael Ross (later organist of Derby Cathedral)
- 1958–1963 John Sanders
- 1963-1973 Richard Latham
- 1973-1975 John Francis Clough (later assistant organist of St Albans Cathedral)
- 1975–1983 Andrew Millington (later organist of Guildford Cathedral and Exeter Cathedral)
- 1983–1990 Mark Blatchly
- 1990–1998 Mark Lee
- 1998–2002 Ian Ball
- 2002–2008 Robert Houssart
- 2008–2012 Ashley Grote (later Director of Music Norwich Cathedral)
- 2012–2013 Anthony Gowing
- 2014–present Jonathan Hope (previously Organ Scholar at Southwark Cathedral and Winchester Cathedral)

== Guildford Cathedral ==
Organists at Guildford Cathedral have included choral director Barry Rose and the composer Philip Moore.

=== Organists ===
- 1927 John Albert Sowerbutts (later Honorary Secretary of the Royal College of Organists)
- 1946 Peter Goodman (later organist of Holy Trinity Church, Hull)
- 1951 Ronald Walter Dussek
- 1961 Barry Rose (later Master of the Choir St Paul's Cathedral, London and Master of the Music at St Albans Cathedral)
- 1974 Philip Moore (later organist of York Minster)
- 1983 Andrew Millington (later Director of Music at Exeter Cathedral)
- 1998 Stephen Farr (later Director of Chapel Music at Worcester College, Oxford)
- 2008 Katherine Dienes-Williams
- 2026 currently vacant

=== Sub-Organists ===
- 1927–1940 Walter William Lionel Baker
- 1954–???? Harry Taylor
- 1960-1961 Roger Moffatt
- 1961-1962 Gordon Mackie
- 1962–1965 Peter Moorse
- 1965-1970 Gavin Williams
- 1970–1977 Anthony Froggatt (later Organist of Portsmouth Cathedral)
- 1977–1989 Peter Wright (later Organist of Southwark Cathedral)
- 1989–2002 Geoffrey Morgan (later Organist of Christchurch Priory)
- 2002–2003 Louise Reid (later Director of Ely Cathedral Girls' Choir)
- 2003–2009 David Davies (later Assistant Director of Music at Exeter Cathedral)
- 2009–2017 Paul Provost (later Rector Chori of Southwell Minster)
- 2017–2023 Richard Moore
- 2023 – present Asher Oliver

== Hereford Cathedral ==
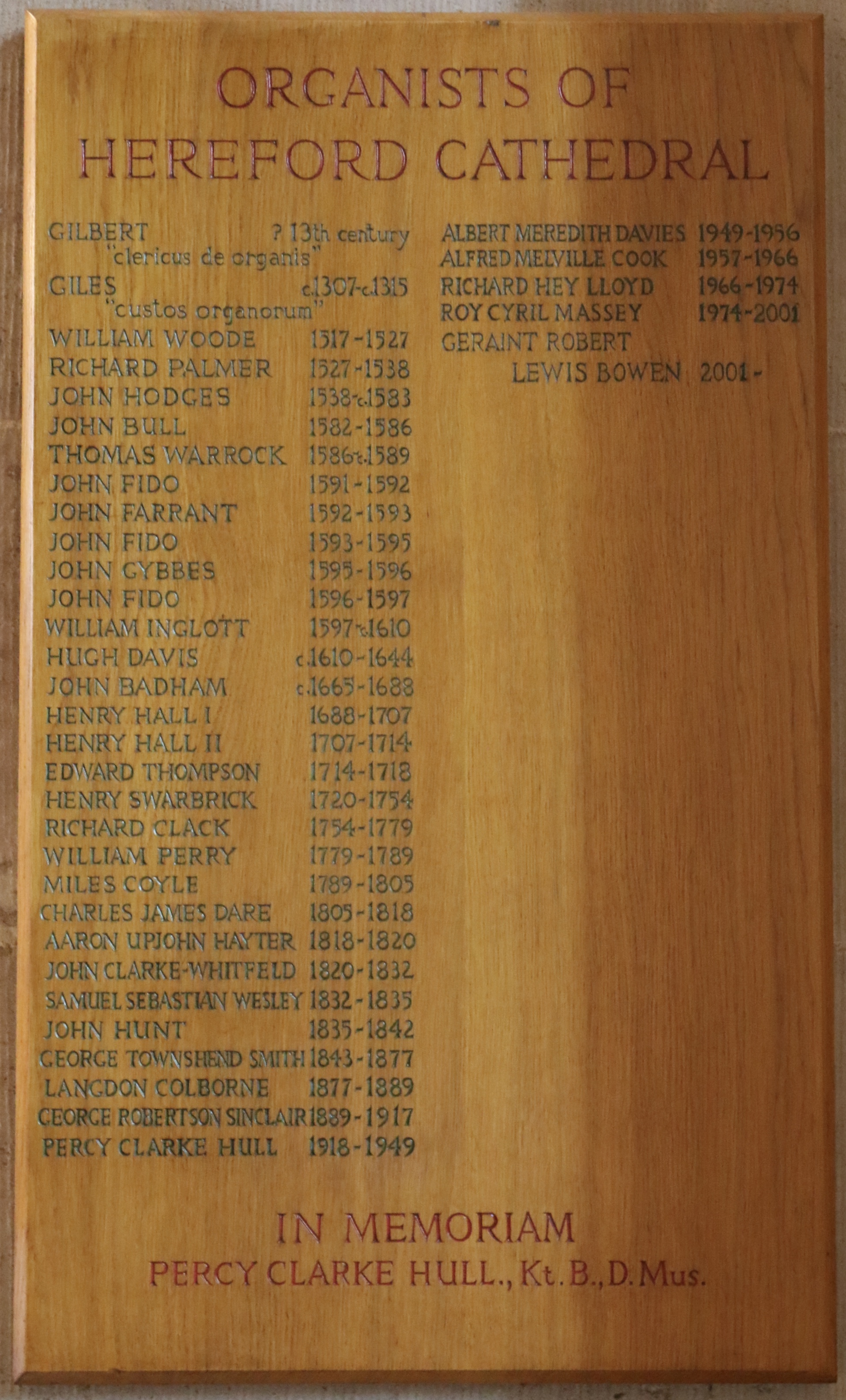
List inside Hereford Cathedral

Notable organists of Hereford Cathedral include the 16th-century composers John Bull and John Farrant, briefly, Samuel Sebastian Wesley (his first cathedral appointment), the conductor and advocate of British composers Meredith Davies and the editor of Allegri's Miserere, Ivor Atkins.

=== Organists ===
- 1517 William Woode
- 1527 Richard Palmer
- 1536 John Slade
- 1538 John Hodges
- 1581 Thomas Mason (Master of the Choristers)
- 1582 John Bull
- 1586 Thomas Warrock(e) (see Fitzwilliam Virginal Book)
- 1586 Thomas Mason (acting organist)
- 1591 John Fido (1st tenure)
- 1592 John Farrant
- 1593 John Fido (2nd tenure)
- 1595 John Gibbs
- 1596 John Fido (3rd tenure)
- 1597 William Inglott (until 1609 or later) (see Fitzwilliam Virginal Book)
- 1630 Hugh Davis (possibly earlier)
- 1660 John Badham
- 1688 Henry Hall
- 1707 Henry Hall, junior
- 1714 Edward Thompson
- 1720 Henry Swarbrick
- 1754 Richard Clack
- 1779 William Perry
- 1789 Miles Coyle (formerly organist of St Laurence's Church, Ludlow)
- 1805 Charles James Dare
- 1818 Aaron Upjohn Hayter
- 1820 John Clarke Whitfeld
- 1832 Samuel Sebastian Wesley
- 1835 John Hunt
- 1843 George Townshend Smith
- 1877 Langdon Colborne
- 1889 George Robertson Sinclair
- 1918 Percy Clarke Hull
- 1950 (Albert) Meredith Davies
- 1956 (Alfred) Melville Cook
- 1966 Richard Lloyd
- 1974 Roy Massey
- 2001 Geraint Bowen
- 2026 Andrew Reid

=== Assistant Organists ===
- 1883–1884 F. J. Livesey
- 1884–1889 Allan Paterson
- 1890–1893 Ivor Atkins (later organist of Worcester Cathedral)
- 1892–1895 Edgar C. Broadhurst (later organist of St. Michael's College, Tenbury)
- 1898-c. 1912 Percy Hull (served in the First World War until 1918 when he became organist of Hereford Cathedral)
- c. 1912 W. R. Carr (probably replaced Percy Hull during the war)
- 1919–1923 Ernest Willoughby
- 1924–1935 Reginald Harry West (later organist of St Patrick's Cathedral, Armagh)
- 1935–1940 Colin Archibald Campbell Ross (later organist at St Paul's Cathedral, Melbourne and Newcastle Cathedral)
- 1940–1942 Christopher John Morris
- 1942–1949 Colin Mann
- 1950–1953 Ross Fink
- 1953–1958 Michael Illman
- 1958–1962 Michael Burton (later organist of the Church of St John the Baptist, Frome)
- 1962–1967 Roger Fisher (later organist of Chester Cathedral)
- 1968–1984 Robert Green
- 1985–1988 David Briggs (later organist of Truro Cathedral and Gloucester Cathedral)
- 1989–1994 Geraint Bowen (later organist of St Davids Cathedral and Hereford Cathedral)
- 1995–1998 Huw Williams (later sub-organist at St Paul's Cathedral)
- 1998–present Peter Dyke

== Leicester Cathedral ==
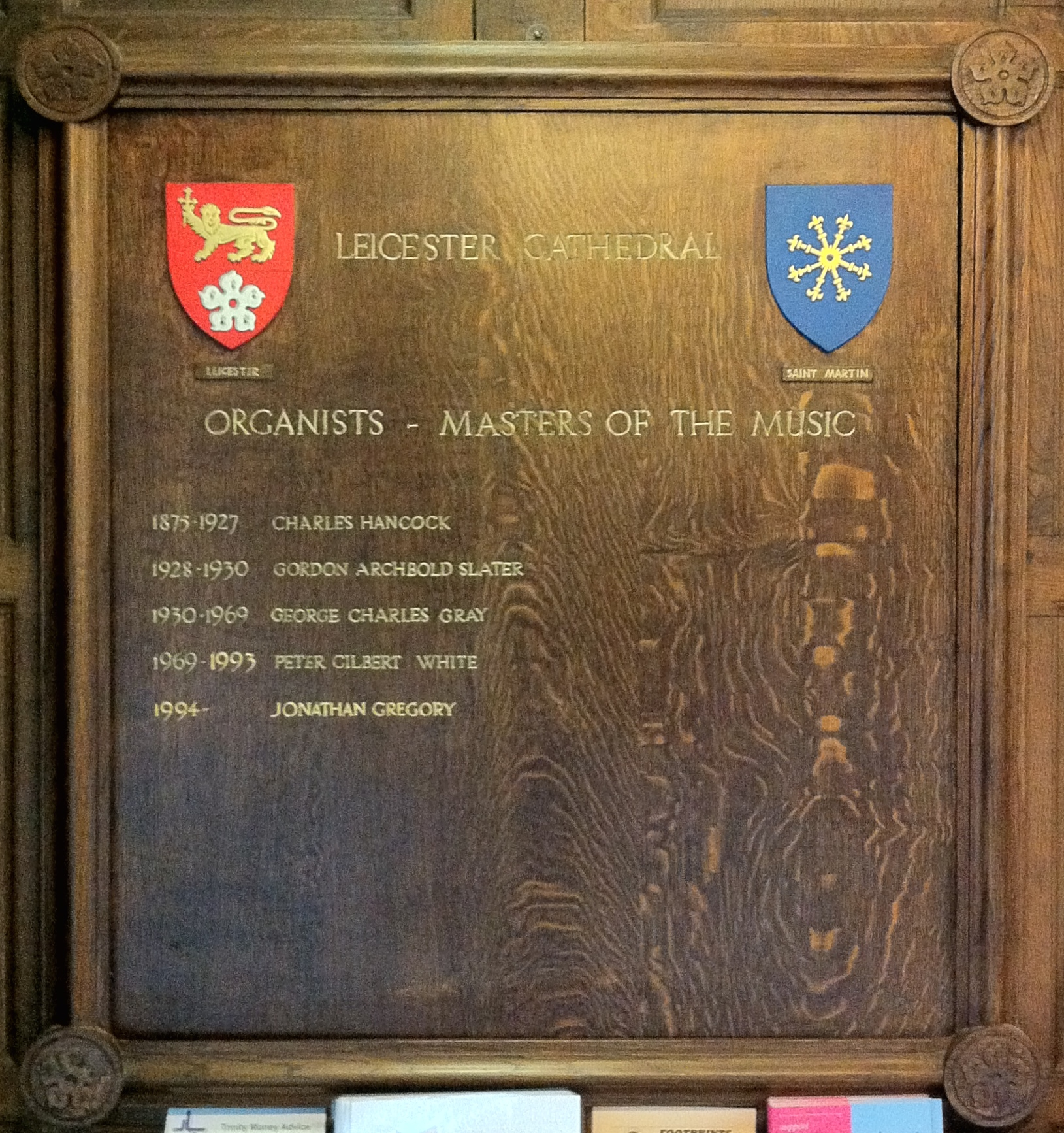
List of organists of Leicester Cathedral

Notable organists at Leicester Cathedral have included Gordon Slater and Jonathan Gregory.

=== Organists and Directors of Music ===
- Richard Hobbs (to 1753) (afterwards organist St Martin in the Bull Ring)
- William Boulton (to 1765)
- Anthony Greatorex 1765 – c. 1772 (father of Thomas Greatorex, who became organist at Westminster Abbey)
- Martha Greatorex 1772–1800 (daughter of Anthony Greatorex)
- Sarah Valentine 1800–1843 (sister of Ann Valentine, who was organist at St Margaret's Church, Leicester)
- Mrs Mary Lee Scott (née Hewitt) 1843-1870
- John Morland 1870–1875
- Charles Hancock 1875–1927
- Gordon Archbold Slater 1927–1931 (subsequently organist at Lincoln Cathedral 1931–1966)
- George Charles Gray 1931–1969 (previously organist at St Michael le Belfrey, York and St. Mary le Tower, Ipswich
- Peter Gilbert White 1969–1994 (previously Assistant Organist of Chester Cathedral 1960–1962)
- Paul Morley-April -July 1994 (Acting Master of the Choristers) Who became Director of Music (St James the Greater, Leicester) 2002-2006, now Director of Leicester Church Music Consort (LCMC) 2005 to present, formerly Organist of Leicester Church Music Consort (LCMC) 1984- 2005
- Jonathan Gregory 1994–2010 (previously organist of St Anne's Cathedral, Belfast, now Director of Music of the UK Japan Choir)
- Christopher Ouvry-Johns 2011–present (formerly Choral Director in the Roman Catholic Diocese of Leeds)

=== Assistant Organists and Assistant Directors of Music ===
- Frederick William Dickerson
- Dennis Arnold Smith 1918
- Stanley Vann 1932 (subsequently Master of the Music at Peterborough Cathedral 1953–1977)
- Thomas Bates Wilkinson 1933
- Wallace Michael Ross 1951 (subsequently assistant organist at Gloucester Cathedral 1954–1958, and organist of Derby Cathedral 1958–1982)
- Sidney Thomas Rudge 1955
- Robert Prime 1965
- Geoffrey Malcolm Herbert Carter 1973 (subsequently organist of St Mary's Church, Humberstone)
- David Cowen 1995 (now Organist of Leicester Cathedral)
- Simon Headley 1999–2018 (also Acting Director of Music in the Autumn of 2010 between the departure of Jonathan Gregory and the appointment of current Director of Music, Christopher Ouvry-Johns)
- Rosie Vinter 2019–present

== Lichfield Cathedral ==
Notable organists of Lichfield Cathedral include the 17th-century composer Michael East, and the musical educator and choral conductor Sir William Henry Harris who conducted at the coronations of both Elizabeth II and George VI

=== Organists ===
- 1618 Michael East
- 1638 Henry Hinde
- 1662 Mr Lamb (Snr)
- 1688 Mr Lamb (Jnr)
- 1723 George Lamb III
- 1750 John Alcock
- 1766 William Brown
- 1807 Samuel Spofforth
- 1864 Thomas Bedsmore
- 1881 John Browning Lott
- 1925 Ambrose P. Porter
- 1959 Richard Greening
- 1978 Jonathan Rees-Williams
- 1992 Andrew Lumsden
- 2002 Philip Scriven
- 2010 Martyn Rawles

This post was restructured in September 2010.

=== Directors of Music ===
- 2010 Ben and Cathy Lamb
- 2016 Ben Lamb

=== Assistant Organists ===
- 1849–1864 Thomas Bedsmore (organist from 1864)
- 1865–1866 James C. Culwick
- William Grainger
- Montague Spinney
- Percival J. Illsley
- 1890–1897 Clement Charlton Palmer (later organist of Canterbury Cathedral)
- ????-1895 Herman Brearley
- 1902–1909 H. Rose
- 1909–1911 Thomas Milton Sowell
- 1911–1919 William Henry Harris (later successively organist of New College, Oxford and Christ Church Cathedral, Oxford, later knighted and organist of St George's Chapel, Windsor Castle)
- 1919–1924 Montague Herbert Spinney
- 1927–1947 Edgar Morgan
- ????-1960 Frayling
- 1950–1952 PW Read
- 1952–1955 Paul H Matthews
- 1955–1959 Donald Cox
- 1959 J W Sharwood
- 1960–1967 Robert Green
- 1968–1974 Peter Noyce
- 1975–1986 Peter King (later organist of Bath Abbey)
- 1986–1994 Mark Shepherd (later organist of the Collegiate Church of St Mary, Warwick)
- 1994–2002 Robert Sharpe (later organist of Truro Cathedral and York Minster)
- 2002–2007 Alexander Mason 7 (later organist of St Davids Cathedral)
- 2007 Cathy Lamb and 2008 Martyn Rawles

This post was restructured in September 2010.

== Lincoln Cathedral ==
Notable organists of Lincoln Cathedral have included the Renaissance composers William Byrd and John Reading and the biographer of Mendelssohn, William Thomas Freemantle.

=== Organists ===
- 1439 John Ingleton
- 1489 John Davy
- 1490 John Warcup
- 1506 Leonard Pepir
- 1508 Thomas Ashwell
- 1518 John Watkins
- 1524 John Gilbert
- 1528 Robert Dove
- 1538 Thomas Appilby
- 1539 James Crowe
- 1541 Thomas Appilby
- 1552 William Monk
- 1559 Thomas Appilby
- 1563 William Byrd
- 1572 Thomas Butler
- 1593 William Boys
- 1594 John Hilton
- 1599 Thomas Kingston
- 1616 John Wanlesse
- 1660 Thomas Mudd
- 1663 Andrew Hecht (John Reading served as chorus master under Hecht)
- 1693 Thomas Hecht
- 1693 Thomas Allinson
- 1704 George Holmes
- 1721 Charles Murgatroy
- 1741 William Middlebrook
- 1756 Lloyd Raynor
- 1784 John Hasted
- 1794 George Skelton
- 1850 John Matthew Wilson Young
- 1895 George Bennett
- 1930 Gordon Archbold Slater
- 1966 Philip Marshall
- 1986 David Flood
- 1988 Colin Walsh

From 2003 the post was divided: Colin Walsh became Organist Laureate and Aric Prentice was appointed Director of Music.

=== Director of Music ===
- 2003 Aric Prentice

=== Assistant Organists ===
Articled pupils fulfilled the role of assistant organist until 1893 when the Chapter formalised the position of assistant organist.

- ????–1594 John Hilton
- 1857–1858 William James Young (brother of the organist) (later organist of St. Mary's Church, Horncastle, then St. Bartholomew's Church, Wilmslow, Cheshire)
- ????–1864 W.H. Wish (later organist of St Andrew's Church, Newcastle upon Tyne)
- Richard Winter
- 1870 William Thomas Freemantle (later organist of St. Andrew's Church, Sharrow)
- ????–1881 Edwin Charles Owston (later organist of St. Andrew's Church, Derby)
- ????–1882 Ernest Wood
- William Rose Pullein
- 1893–1894 Frank Pullein (later organist of St Giles' Church, Wrexham)
- 1895–1899 Edgar Cyril Robinson (later organist of Gainsborough Parish Church and then Wigan Parish Church)
- 1899–1904 Harry Smith Trevitt
- 19 July 1921 Frederick David Linley Penny
- 1922–1926 William Wells Hewitt (later organist of Church of the Holy Trinity, Stratford-upon-Avon)
- 1926–1930 Edward Francis Reginald Woolley (later organist of Church of St Mary Magdalene, Newark-on-Trent)
- 1931–1936 Willis Grant (later organist of St. Philip's Cathedral, Birmingham)
- 1936–1975 Clifford Hewis
- 1975–1992 Roger Bryan (later organist of St Mary Magdalene Church, Newark-on-Trent)
- 1992–1993 Andrew Post (later Director of Music, Christchurch Priory)
- 1993–1994 James Antony Vivian (acting)
- 1994–1999 Jeffrey Makinson (later assistant organist of Manchester Cathedral)
- 1999–2003 Simon Morley
- Julian Thomas
- Stephen Bullamore (later organist of Waltham Abbey)
- Jamie John Hutchings (later Director of Music at Headington School, Oxford)
- 2005–2007 Richard Apperley (later Assistant Director of Music at Saint Paul's Cathedral, Wellington in New Zealand)
- 2008–2011 Benjamin Chewter (later Assistant Director of Music at Chester Cathedral)
- 2011–2014 Claire Innes-Hopkins (later Assistant Organist of Rochester Cathedral)
- 2014–2019 Hilary Punnett
- 2019-2023 Alana Brook

=== Assistant Directors of Music ===
- 2003–2014 Charles Harrison (later organist of Chichester Cathedral)
- 2014–2015 Sachin Gunga (acting)
- 2015– Jeffrey Makinson

== Liverpool Cathedral ==
Notable organists at Liverpool Cathedral have included Edgar Robinson and Ian Tracey.

=== Directors of Music of Liverpool Cathedral ===
- 1910–1916 Frederick Hampton Burstall (of the Lady Chapel)
- 1924–1947 Edgar Cyril Robinson
- 1947–1982 Ronald Woan
- 1982–2007 – Ian Tracey
- 2008–2017 David Poulter
- 2017–2021 Lee Ward
- 2021-current Stephen Mannings

=== Organists of Liverpool Cathedral ===
- 1910–1916 Frederick Hampton Burstall (of the Lady Chapel)
- 1916–1955 Walter Henry Goss-Custard
- 1955–1980 Noel Rawsthorne
- 1980–2026 Ian Tracey
- 2027- Martyn Noble (also Assistant Director of Music)

== London, St Paul's Cathedral ==
The many distinguished musicians who have been organists, choir masters and choristers at St Paul's Cathedral include the composers John Redford, Thomas Morley, John Blow, Jeremiah Clarke and John Stainer, while well known performers have included Alfred Deller, John Shirley-Quirk, Anthony Way and the conductors Charles Groves and Paul Hillier and the poet Walter de la Mare.

=== Organists and Directors of Music ===
- c.1525–1547 John Redford (also Almoner)
- 1547 Philip ap Rhys (until c.1559)
- 1573 Henry Mudd
- 1587? – 1592? Thomas Morley
- 1598 Thomas Harrold
- 1619 John Tomkins
- 1638–1642 Albertus Bryne
- 1660–1668 Albertus Bryne
- 1687 Isaac Blackwell
- 1699 Jeremiah Clarke (also Almoner 1704-7)
- 1707 Richard Brind
- 1718 Maurice Greene
- 1756 John Jones
- 1796 Thomas Attwood
- 1838 Sir John Goss
- 1872 Sir John Stainer
- 1888 Sir George Clement Martin
- 1916 Charles Macpherson
- 1927 Sir Stanley Marchant
- 1936 Sir John Dykes Bower
- 1968 Christopher Dearnley
- 1990 John Scott (Organist & Director of Music)
- 2004 Malcolm Archer
- 2007 Andrew Carwood (Director of Music)

=== Sub-Organists and Assistant Organists ===
- ????-1838 George Cooper (father)
- 1838–1876 George Cooper (son) (also Organist Chapel Royal)
- 1876–1888 George Clement Martin (subsequently Organist)
- 1888–1895 William Hodge
- 1895–1916 Charles Macpherson (subsequently Organist)
- 1916–1927 Stanley Marchant (subsequently Organist)
- 1927–1946 Douglas Edward Hopkins (subsequently Organist Peterborough Cathedral; later Organist Canterbury Cathedral)
- 1946–1974 Harry Gabb (also Organist, Choirmaster & Composer HM Chapel Royal)
- 1974–1984 Barry Rose (Master of the Choir 1977–84; later Master of Music St Albans Cathedral)
- 1985–1990 John Scott (subsequently Organist and Director of Music; later Director of Music St Thomas, Fifth Avenue)
- 1990–1998 Andrew Lucas (now Master of Music, St Albans Cathedral)
- 1998–2008 Huw Williams (subsequently Organist, Chapel Royal; now Organist Bath Abbey)

In 2007 the posts of Organist and Director of Music were separated, the Sub-Organist post being re-titled Organist & Assistant Director of Music in September 2008.

Organist and Assistant Director of Music

- 2008-2021 Simon Johnson

In 2023 the Music Department was expanded to include the three roles as follows: Organist, Assistant Director of Music, and Artistic Director of Choral Partnerships.

Organist

- 2024 James Orford

Assistant Director of Music

- 2025 Hilary Punnett

Artistic Director of Choral Partnerships

- 2023 William Bruce

=== Assistant Sub-Organists and Sub-Organists ===
- 1953–1956 Gerald Wheeler
- 1956–1958 Derek Holman
- 1958–1966 Richard Popplewell (later Organist, Choirmaster & Composer HM Chapel Royal)
- 1966–1967 Timothy Farrell (later Organist, Choirmaster & Composer HM Chapel Royal)
- 1967–1978 Christopher Herrick (later Sub-Organist Westminster Abbey)
- 1978–1985 John Scott (simultaneously Assistant Organist Southwark Cathedral; later Sub-Organist of St Paul's)
- 1985–1990 Andrew Lucas (subsequently Sub-Organist, later Organist of St Albans Cathedral)
- 1990–1991 Martin Baker (later Sub-Organist & Acting Organist Westminster Abbey; lately Master of Music Westminster Cathedral)
- 1992–2000 Richard Moorhouse (subsequently Organist & Master of the Choristers Llandaff Cathedral)
- 2000–2006 Mark Williams (subsequently Director of Music Jesus College, Cambridge, now Informator Choristarum, Magdalen College, Oxford)
- 2006–2008 Tom Winpenny (subsequently Assistant Master of Music St Albans Cathedral)

In 2007 the posts of Organist and Director of Music were separated, the Assistant Sub-Organist post being re-titled Sub-Organist in April 2008 to reflect the increased demands and prominence of the role.

Sub-Organists

- 2008–2014 Timothy Wakerell (subsequently Assistant Organist New College, Oxford)
- 2014–2017 Peter Holder (now Sub Organist Westminster Abbey)
- 2018– William Fox
- 2025- George Inscoe

=== Almoners and Masters of the Choristers ===
- 1315–1329 William of Tolleshunt
- fl. 1345 John de Hadley
- fl. 1358 John de Ware
- ????–1534 Thomas Hickman
- 1530–1540 John Redford (also Organist)
- before 1552 Thomas Mulliner
- 1559–1576 Sebastian Westcote (Vicar Choral)
- 1584–1589 Thomas Giles
- 1596 Edward Kerkham
- 1599–1612 Edward Pearce or Piers
- 1613–1624 John Gibbs
- 1626–1742 Martin Peerson
- 1661–1775 Randall Jewett
- 1686–1687 Michael Wise
- 1687–1693 John Blow
- 1693–1707 Jeremiah Clarke (also Organist)
- 1707–1748 Charles King (Vicar Choral)
- 1748–1773 William Savage (Vicar Choral)
- 1773–1793 Robert Hudson (Vicar Choral)
- 1793–1800 Richard Bellamy (Vicar Choral)
- 1800–1812 John Sale (Vicar Choral)
- 1812–1846 William Hawes (Vicar Choral)
- 1846–1853 William Hale
- 1853–1872 J. H. Coward (Minor Canon)

The title of Almoner was abolished in 1872, while the post of Master of the Choristers was held by a succession of Vicars Choral:

- 1846–1858 William Bayley
- 1858?–1867 Henry Buckland
- 1867–1874 Frederick Walker (resigned upon establishment of St Paul's Cathedral School on the present basis)
- 1874–1876 George Clement Martin (subsequently Sub-Organist & then Organist)

The training of the choristers was then entrusted to the Organist and his deputies until –

- 1977–1984 Barry Rose 1977–1984 (Master of the Choir)

In 1990 the post was re-united with that of Organist under John Scott

=== Some notable Choristers and Vicars Choral ===
16th century

- John Redford (Vicar Choral) composer
- William Mundy (Vicar Choral), composer.
- Peter Philips (chorister), composer.

17th century

- Adrian Batten (Vicar Choral), composer.

18th century

- Jonathan Battishill (chorister), composer.
- William Boyce (chorister), composer.
- Maurice Greene (chorister), composer and Organist of St Paul's Cathedral.

19th century

- William Cummings (chorister), composer and organist.
- Frederick Ranalow (chorister), baritone and actor
- John Stainer (chorister), Organist of St Paul's Cathedral and Professor of Music at Oxford University.

20th century

- Peter Auty (chorister), operatic tenor
- Simon Russell Beale (chorister), actor
- Maurice Bevan (Vicar Choral), composer
- Alastair Cook (chorister), cricketer.
- Alfred Deller (Vicar Choral), counter-tenor.
- Jimmy Edwards (chorister), actor.
- Gerald English (Vicar Choral), tenor.
- Charles Groves (chorister), conductor.
- Paul Hillier (Vicar Choral), conductor.
- Robin Holloway (chorister), composer.
- Neil Howlett (chorister), opera singer and teacher.
- James Lancelot (chorister), sometime Organist and Lay Canon of Durham Cathedral.
- Walter de la Mare (chorister), poet and novelist.
- Stephen Oliver (chorister), composer.
- Julian Ovenden (chorister), actor and singer.
- John Shirley-Quirk (Vicar Choral), bass-baritone.
- Robert Tear (Vicar Choral), tenor and conductor.
- Anthony Way (chorister), treble.

== Manchester Cathedral ==
Notable organists at Manchester Cathedral have included Frederick Bridge and Sydney Nicholson.

=== Organists ===
- 1635 John Leigh
- 1637 William Garter
- 1666 William Turner
- 1670 William Keys
- 1679 Richard Booth
- 1696 Edward Tetlow
- 1702 James Holland
- 1704 Edward Edge
- 1714 Edward Betts
- 1767 John Wainwright
- 1768 Robert Wainwright
- 1775 Richard Wainwright
- 1783 Grifiith James Cheese
- 1804 William Sudlow
- 1831 William Sudlow and Joseph John Harris
- 1848 Joseph John Harris
- 1869 Frederick Bridge (later Sir Frederick Bridge organist of Westminster Abbey)
- 1875 James Kendrick Pyne
- 1908 Sydney Nicholson (later Sir Sydney Nicholson organist of Westminster Abbey and founder of the Royal School of Church Music)
- 1919 Archibald W. Wilson
- 1943 Norman Cocker
- 1954 Allan Wicks (later organist of Canterbury Cathedral)
- 1962 Derrick Edward Cantrell
- 1977 Robert Vincent
- 1980–1981 Stephen Pinnock (organist)
- 1980–1996 Stuart Beer (Master of the Choir)
- 1981–1992 Gordon Stewart (Organist)
- 1992–1996 Christopher Stokes (Organist)
- 1996– Christopher Stokes (Organist and Master of the Choristers)

=== Assistant organists ===
- 1869–1871 Joseph Cox Bridge (later organist of Chester Cathedral)
- 1876 R.H. Wilson
- ?–1881 Minton Pyne
- Samuel Myerscough
- Richard Henry Mort
- 1895–1896 Herbert C. Morris (later organist of St David's Cathedral)
- Harold Mitchell Dawber (later organist St George’s Stockport)
- Frank Radcliffe (later organist of St. Wulfrum's Church, Grantham, and St. Mary's Church, Nottingham)
- 1908–1912 Richard Henry Coleman (later organist of Peterborough Cathedral)
- 1912–1919 Ernest Bullock (later organist of Exeter Cathedral and Westminster Abbey)
- 1919 Arnold Goldsbrough
- 1920–1922 Norman Cocker (also 1923–1943, afterwards organist here)
- 1922–1923 Thomas Armstrong (afterwards organist of St. Peter's Church, Eaton Square, London, later organist of Exeter Cathedral
- 1943–1946 William Oswald Minay
- 1946– Edward Fry
- 1950– Douglas Steele
- 1961– John Wenlock Gittins
- 1968–1970 Jonathan Bielby (afterwards organist of Wakefield Cathedral)
- 1970–1974 Brian Hodge
- 1972–1974 John Wenlock Gittins (also, Alto Lay Clerk at this time)
- 1975–1980 Stephen Drew Pinnock (afterwards Director of Music at Ardingly College)
- 1996–1999 Matthew Owens
- 1999–2014 Jeffrey Makinson
- 2015–2025 Geoffrey Woollatt (now Organist and Director of Music at Bradford Cathedral)
- 2025– Ben Collyer

== Newcastle Cathedral ==
Notable organists at Newcastle Cathedral have included Charles Avison and Colin Ross.

=== Organists ===
- 1687 Samuel Nichols
- 1736 Charles Avison
- 1770 Edward Avison
- 1776 Matthias Hawdon
- 1789 Charles Avison Jnr
- 1795 Thomas Thompson
- 1834 Dr Thomas Ions
- 1857 William Ions
- 1894 George Huntley
- 1895 John Jeffries
- 1918 William Ellis
- 1936 Kenneth Malcolmson
- 1955 Colin Ross
- 1967 Dr. Russell Missin
- 1987 Timothy Hone
- 2002 Scott Farrell
- 2008 George Richford (Acting)
- 2009 Michael Stoddart
- 2016 Ian Roberts

=== Assistant organists ===
- 1928–1933 Thomas Christy (afterwards organist of Hexham Abbey)
- 1936 Clifford Harker (afterwards organist at Bristol Cathedral)
- 1959–1960 Michael Bryan Hesford (afterwards organist at Brecon Cathedral)
- 1960–1980 Graeme East (afterwards Organist St Chad's Gateshead then Warnham Parish Church. d.2010)
- 1980–1984 Keith Downie (Lay Clerk and sub-Assistant 1972–1980 & 1984–1988): now St Helen's Gateshead
- 1984–2009 Michael Dutton (afterwards Director of Music at Dame Allan's Schools)

=== Director of the Girls Choir and Sub-Organist ===
- 2008-2009 George Richford, Founder Director of the Girls Choir
- 2009-2010 Austin Gunn (acting), now professor in vocal studies at Trinity Laban Conservatoire of Music & Dance
- 2010–2012 David Stevens (later Organist and Master of the Choristers at Belfast Cathedral, and Sub-Assistant Organist at Wells Cathedral)

=== Assistant Director of Music ===
- 2012–2015 James Norrey (became Assistant Sub-Organist at Rochester Cathedral)
- 2015 Kris Thomsett

== Norwich Cathedral ==
Notable organists of Norwich Cathedral have included Zechariah Buck and Brian Runnett, and composers Thomas Morley, Heathcote Dicken Statham, Alfred R. Gaul and Arthur Henry Mann.

=== Organists and Masters of the Music ===
- 1313 Adam the Organist
- 1424 Thomas Wath
- 1445 John Skarlette
- 1542 Thomas Grewe
- 1560 Edmund Inglott
- 1583 Thomas Morley
- 1593 William Baker
- 1594 William Cobbold
- 1608 William Inglott
- 1621 Richard Gibbs
- 1661 Richard Ayleward
- 1664 Thomas Gibbs
- 1666 Richard Ayleward
- 1670 Thomas Pleasants
- 1689 James Cooper
- 1721 Humphrey Cotton
- 1749 Thomas Garland
- 1808 John Christmas Beckwith
- 1809 John Charles Beckwith
- 1819 Zechariah Buck
- 1877 Francis Edward Gladstone
- 1881 Frederick Cook Atkinson
- 1885 Frank Bates
- 1928 Heathcote Dicken Statham
- 1967 Brian Runnett (died while in office)
- 1971 Michael Nicholas
- 1994 David Anthony Cooper
- 1995 Neil Taylor (Acting)
- 1996 David Dunnett
- 2007 David Lowe (Master of Music), David Dunnett continues as organist
- 2011 David Dunnett (Acting Organist and Master of the Music)
- 2012 Ashley Grote (Master of Music), David Dunnett continues as organist (retired 2025)

=== Assistant Organists ===
- 1815–1819 Zechariah Buck (afterwards organist)
- Thomas Wolsey White
- ????-1845 George Augustus Löhr
- 1850s Alfred R. Gaul
- 1850s Frederick Cook Atkinson
- 1855–1877 Edward Bunnett
- Arthur Henry Mann (later organist and director of music, King's College, Cambridge)
- Philip Chignell
- A. Miller Potts
- 1895 C. H. Duffield
- Claude Alan Forster
- Herbert J. Dawson
- 1903–1905 Alfred Heath
- 1906 Richard John Maddern-Williams
- 1907–1908 Nelson Victor Edwards
- 1910–1914 Wilfrid Greenhouse Allt (later organist of St Giles' Cathedral, Edinburgh)
- 1978–1983 Malcolm Archer (later successively organist of Bristol Cathedral, Wells Cathedral and St Paul's Cathedral, London and organist and director of music at Winchester College)
- 1983–1990 Adrian Lucas (later organist of Worcester Cathedral)
- 1990–1997 Neil Taylor (later organist of Sheffield Cathedral)
- Katherine Dienes-Williams (later organist of Guildford Cathedral)
- Julian Thomas
- Ben Giddens
- Tom Primrose
- 2025– Christopher Too

=== Assistant Master of Music and Sub-Organist ===
Role created on the retirement of David Dunnett in 2025

- 2025- Graham Thorpe

=== Other ===
- Anthony Beck, appointed lay clerk in 1639 and minor canon in 1663. Was active as a composer at Norwich.

== Oxford, Christ Church ==
First among the notable organists of Christ Church, Oxford is the Renaissance composer John Taverner. Other significant composers and conductors are Basil Harwood, Sir William Henry Harris, Sir Thomas Armstrong, Sydney Watson, Francis Grier, Simon Preston and Nicholas Cleobury.

=== Organists ===
- 1530 John Taverner
- 1564 Bartholomew Lant
- 1611 Matthew White
- 1613 William Stonard
- 1630 Edward Lowe
- 1682 William Husbands
- 1690 Charles Husbands
- 1691 Richard Goodson (Sr)
- 1718 Richard Goodson (Jr)
- 1741 Richard Church
- 1776 Thomas Norris
- 1790 William Crotch
- 1807 William Cross
- 1825 William Marshall
- 1846 Charles William Corfe
- 1882 Charles Harford Lloyd
- 1892 Basil Harwood
- 1909 Henry George Ley
- 1926 Noel Edward Ponsonby
- 1929 William Henry Harris
- 1933 Thomas Armstrong
- 1955 Sydney Watson
- 1970 Simon Preston
- 1981 Francis Grier
- 1985 Stephen Darlington
- 2018 Steven Grahl
- 2023 Stephen Darlington
- 2024 Peter Holder

=== Sub-Organists ===
Assistant Organist (1753–1990)

- 1753 William Walond Sr.
- 1924 Sidney Thomas Mayow Newman
- 1928 ?
- 1938 Ivor Christopher Banfield Keys
- 1940 ?
- 1943 Alec Wyton (later Organist, Cathedral of St. John the Divine, New York City, USA)
- 1946 Ivor Christopher Banfield Keys
- 1947 ?
- 1953 Harrison Oxley (later organist of St Edmundsbury Cathedral)
- 1955 ?
- 1957 Anthony Crossland (later organist of Wells Cathedral)
- 1958 Michael John Smith (later organist of Llandaff Cathedral)
- 1961 ?
- 1972 Nicholas Cleobury
- 197? Francis Grier
- 1983 Catherine Ennis
- 1984 Robin Bowman
- 1986 Simon Lawford

Sub-Organist (1990–present)

- 1990 Stephen Farr
- 1996 David Goode
- 2001 Clive Driskill-Smith
- 2020 Benjamin Sheen

=== Precentors ===
- 1938–1945 Wilfrid Oldaker

== Peel Cathedral (Isle of Man) ==
Organists at Peel Cathedral have included the following.

=== Organists and Choirmasters ===
- 1983 Mike Porter
- 1986 Bernard Clark
- 1991 Mark Roper
- 1992 Stephen Dutton
- 1993 Edward Coleman
- 1995 Harvey Easton
- 2001 Mike Porter

Between 1991 and 1994 the job was combined with the Head of Music position at King Williams College.

=== Organists and Directors of Music ===
- 2008 Donald Roworth
- 2012 Peter Litman

=== Associate Organist ===
- 2018–present Stuart Corrie

== Peterborough Cathedral ==
Notable organists of Peterborough Cathedral have included Stanley Vann, Sir Malcolm Sargent and Sir Thomas Armstrong.

=== Masters of the Music ===
- 1540 Richard Storey
- 1569 John Tyesdale
- 1574 Richard Tiller
- 1584 John Mudd
- 1631 Thomas Mudd
- 1632 David Standish
- 1643 Vacant
- 1661 David Standish
- 1677 William Standish
- 1691 Roger Standish
- 1714 James Hawkins
- 1750 George Wright
- 1773 Garter Sharp
- 1777 James Rogers
- 1784 Richard Langdon
- 1785 John Calah
- 1799 Samuel Spofforth
- 1808 Thomas Knight
- 1812 Edmund Larkin
- 1836 John Speechley
- 1870 Dr Haydn Keeton
- 1921 Dr Richard Henry Coleman
- 1944 Charles Cooper Francis
- 1946 Douglas Edward Hopkins (later Organist of Canterbury Cathedral)
- 1953 Dr Stanley Vann
- 1977 Christopher Gower
- 2004 Andrew Reid (Director of Music)
- 2013 Robert Quinney (later Organist and Director of Music New College, Oxford)
- 2014 Steven Grahl (later Organist Christ Church, Oxford 2018-2023 and Director of Music Trinity College, Cambridge 2024-
- 2018 Tansy Castledine
- 2025 Christopher Strange

=== Assistant Masters of the Music ===
- Samuel Round
- 1895 George Pattman
- 1900–1902 H. M. Goodacre
- 1902–1903 Arthur Griffin Claypole
- 1905–1910 Charles Cooper Francis (later appointed Master of the Music)
- 1911–1914 Malcolm Sargent (Articled Pupil/Assistant to Haydn Keeton, later knighted)
- 1915–1917 Thomas Armstrong (Articled Pupil/Assistant, subsequently Organist of Exeter Cathedral, later knighted, Principal of the Royal Academy of Music)
- 1918–1925 Eric John Fairclough
- 1930–1931 J. Durham Holl
- 1932–? R. Shield
- ca. 1938 Derek John Clare
- ca. 1938 Desmond Swinburn
- 1950–1953 John Malcolm Tyler (later Assistant Organist at Canterbury Cathedral)
- 1954–1955 Philip Joseph Lank (later Organist of St Wulfram's Church, Grantham)
- 1956–1959 Malcolm Ernest Cousins (later Organist of St. Peter and St. Paul's Church, Mansfield)
- 1960 Eric Howard Fletcher (later Professor of Music in USA)
- Richard Latham (later Assistant Organist at Gloucester Cathedral)
- 1964–1971 Barry Ferguson (later Organist of Rochester Cathedral)
- 1971–1980 Andrew Robert Newberry
- 1980–1986 Simon Lawford (later Director of Music at St George's Cathedral, Perth)
- 1986–1992? Gary Sieling (later Director of Music at St Peter's Church, Nottingham and Bromley Parish Church)
- 1993–1995 Simon Bowler
- 1994–2007 Mark Duthie (later Organist of Brecon Cathedral, subsequently Director of Music at Carlisle Cathedral)
- 1998–2002 Thomas Moore (Assistant Organist, later Director of Music at Wakefield Cathedral)
- 2002–2007 Oliver Waterer (Assistant Organist, later Organist of St Davids Cathedral)
- 2007–2011 Francesca Massey (Assistant Director of Music, later Sub Organist of Durham Cathedral)
- 2011–2020 David Humphreys
- 2020-2025 Christopher Strange (later appointed Director of Music)
- 2025-2026 Glen Dempsey (Interim)
- 2026 - William Campbell

== Portsmouth Cathedral ==
Notable organists at Portsmouth Cathedral have included Adrian Lucas and David Price.

=== Organists ===
- 1927 Hugh Burry
- 1933 T. H. Newboult
- 1944 John Davison
- 1959 Maxwell Menzies
- 1964 Peter Stevenson
- 1968 Christopher Gower
- 1977 Anthony Froggatt
- 1990 Adrian Lucas
- 1996 David Price

=== Sub-Organists ===
- 1930 Mr Pease
- 1963 Hugh Davis
- 1978 David Thorne
- 1999 Rosemary Field
- 2005 Marcus Wibberley
- 2012 Oliver Hancock
- 2018 Sachin Gunga

== Ripon Cathedral ==
Notable organists of Ripon Cathedral have included composers Charles Harry Moody and Ronald Edward Perrin.

=== Organists ===
- 1447 Thomas Litster (priest)
- 1478 Lawrence Lancaster
- 1511 John Watson
- 1513 William Swaine
- 1520 Adam Bakehouse
- 1540 William Solber
- 1548 Interregnum
- 1613 John Wanlass
- ca. 1643 Interregnum
- 1662 Henry Wanlass
- 1670 Wilson
- 1674 Alexander Shaw
- 1677 William Sorrell
- 1682 John Hawkins
- 1690 Thomas Preston (sen)
- 1731 Thomas Preston (jun)
- 1748 William Ayrton
- 1799 William F. M. Ayrton (elder son)
- 1802 Nicholas T. D. Ayrton (younger son)
- 1823 John Henry Bond
- 1829 George Bates
- 1874 Edwin John Crow
- 1902 Dr Charles Harry Moody, (formerly organist of Holy Trinity Church, Coventry)
- 1954 Lionel Frederick Dakers
- 1957 Dr Philip Marshall
- 1966 Ronald Edward Perrin
- 1994 Kerry Beaumont
- 2002 Andrew Bryden (Acting)
- 2003 Simon Morley
- 2003 Andrew Bryden
- 2020 Peter Wright (Acting)
- 2022 Dr Ronny Krippner

=== Assistant Organists/Assistant Directors of Music ===
- Edward Brown
- 1876–1881 Henry Taylor
- ???? J. William-Render
- William Rains
- William Edward Cave
- Edgar Alfred Lane
- ????-1887 Herbert Arthur Wheeldon
- 1887–1890 Charles Morton Bailey
- Edgar Watson
- ca. 1908 C. Richards
- David Lamb
- 1925–1927 Leonard Bagguley (formerly assistant organist of St Mary's Church, Nottingham, afterwards organist of Paignton Parish Church)

The post of assistant organist was informal until 1928 when it was made official.

- 1928–1935 Dennis Cocks
- 1935–1939 Alfred H. Allsop
- World War Two (1939–1947)
- 1947–1952 Alex Forrest
- 1952–1955 Paul Mace
- 1955–1956 Keith Bond
- 1956–1958 Peter Anthony Stanley Stevenson
- 1958–1963 Laurence Gibbon
- 1963–1974 Alan Dance
- 1974–1986 Marcus Huxley (later organist of St. Philip's Cathedral, Birmingham)
- 1986–1998 Robert Marsh
- 1998–2003 Andrew Bryden (then organist)
- 2003-2004 Stephen Power (Acting)
- 2004–2008 Thomas Leech
- 2009–2013 Edmund Aldhouse
- 2013–2014 Ben Horden (acting)
- 2014- Tim Harper (Assistant Director of Music)
- 2023-2026 Alastair Stone (Assistant Organist)
- 2026- George Balfour (Assistant Organist)

== Rochester Cathedral ==
Among the composers, conductors and concert performers who have been organists at Rochester Cathedral are Bertram Luard-Selby, Harold Aubie Bennett, Percy Whitlock and William Whitehead.

=== Organists ===
- 1559 James Plomley
- 1588 Roper Blundell
- 1599 John Williams
- 1614 John Heath
- 1672 Charles Wren
- 1674 Daniel Henstridge
- 1699 Robert Bowers
- 1704 John Spain
- 1721 Charles Peach
- 1753 Joseph Howe
- 1781 Richard Howe
- 1790 Ralph Banks
- 1841 John Larkin Hopkins
- 1856 John Hopkins
- 1900 Bertram Luard-Selby
- 1916 Charles Hylton Stewart
- 1930 Harold Aubie Bennett
- 1956 Robert Ashfield
- 1977 Barry Ferguson
- 1994 Roger Sayer
- 2008 Scott Farrell
- 2018 Adrian Bawtree (Interim Director of Music)
- 2019 Francesca Massey
- 2022 Adrian Bawtree
- 2026 Robbie Carroll (Interim Director of Music)

=== Assistant Organists ===
- -1841 Henry Edmund Ford (later organist and Master of the Music of Carlisle Cathedral)
- 1850–1856 Philip Armes (later organist of Durham Cathedral)
- 1859–1865 Frederick Bridge, (later Sir Frederick Bridge organist of Westminster Abbey)
- Alfred Alexander
- ca.1868 Joseph Bridge (later organist of Chester Cathedral)
- 1899–1901 Glanville Hopkins
- 1902–1908 Hector E. Shallcross
- 1919–1921 Alfred H. Allen
- 1921–1930 Percy Whitlock (then organist of St Stephen's Church, Bournemouth)
- 1930–1977 James Alfred Levett
- 1977–1981 David Poulter (subsequently Director of Music at Coventry Cathedral, Chester Cathedral, and Liverpool Cathedral)
- 1982–1989 Paul Hale (later organist and rector chori of Southwell Minster)
- 1989–1994 Roger Sayer
- 1994–1998 William Whitehead
- 1998–2001 Sean Farrell
- 2001–2002 James Eaton (acting)
- 2002–2006 Edmund Aldhouse
- 2006–2010 Dan Soper
- 2010–2014 Samuel Rathbone
- 2014–2018 Claire Innes-Hopkins
- 2018–2024 Jeremy Lloyd
- 2024–2026 Robbie Carroll
- 2026– Joel Colyer (Interim Assistant Director of Music and Sub-Organist)

=== Cathedral Organists ===
- 2008–2013 Roger Sayer
- 2014–2015 Adrian Bawtree

=== Assistant Sub-Organists ===
- 2015 Ben Bloor
- 2016–2018 James Norrey

== St Albans Cathedral ==
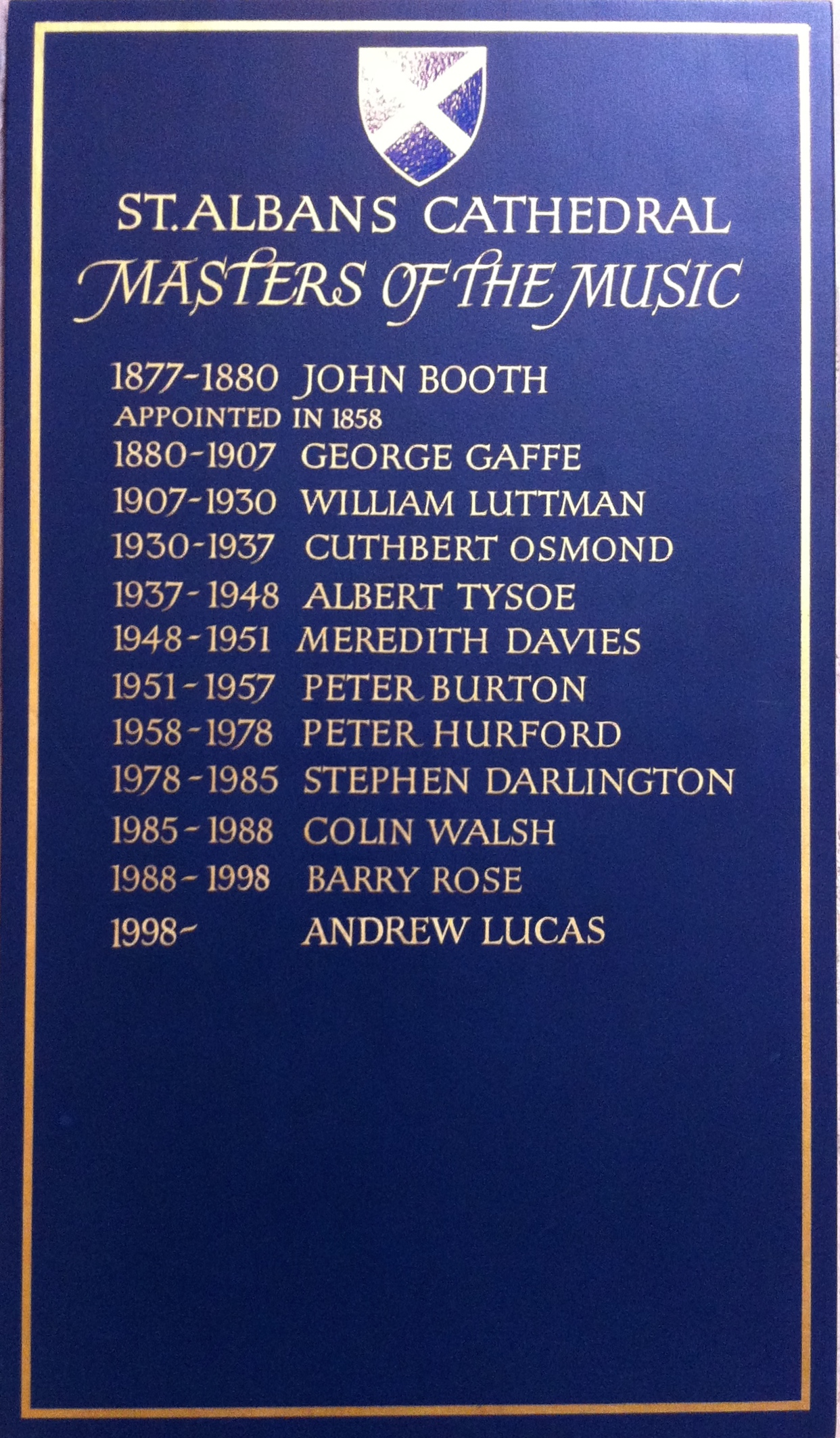
List of organists of St Albans Cathedral

The posts of Organist and Master of the Music at St Albans Cathedral have been held by a number of well-known musicians, including Peter Hurford, Stephen Darlington and Barry Rose. The current Director of Music is William Fox. Since 1963 the cathedral has been home to the St Albans International Organ Festival, winners of which include Dame Gillian Weir, Thomas Trotter and Naji Hakim. Following Andrew Lucas's retirement after more than 25 years in the post, the roles and responsibilities of the cathedral's two senior musicians were reviewed, and changed to Director of Music and Assistant Director of Music and Partnerships from September 2024.

=== Organists ===
- 1302 Adam
- 1498 Robert Fayrfax
- 1529 Henry Besteney
- 1820 Thomas Fowler
- 1831 Edwin Nicholls
- 1833 Thomas Fowler
- 1837 Thomas Brooks
- 1846 John Brooks
- 1855 William Simmons
- 1858 John Stocks Booth

=== Organists and Masters of the Music ===
- 1877 John Stocks Booth
- 1880 George Gaffe
- 1907 Willie Lewis Luttman
- 1930 Cuthbert E. Osmond
- 1937 Albert Charles Tysoe
- 1947 Meredith Davies
- 1951 Claude Peter Primrose Burton
- 1957 Peter Hurford
- 1978 Stephen Darlington
- 1985 Colin Walsh
- 1988 Barry Rose
- 1998 Andrew Lucas

=== Directors of Music ===
- 2024 William Fox

=== Assistant Organists ===
- 1908–1909 John Cawley
- 1921–1930 George C. Straker
- 1936–1939 Sydney John Barlow
- 1945–1951 Frederick Carter
- 1951–1970 John Henry Freeman
- 1970–1975 Simon Lindley
- 1972-1973 Anthony Jennings
- 1975–1976 John Clough
- 1976–2001 Andrew Parnell
- 2001–2008 Simon Johnson (later Assistant Director of Music St Paul's Cathedral and, from 2021, Master of Music at Westminster Cathedral)
- 2008–2024 Tom Winpenny

=== Assistant Directors of Music ===
- 2024-2025 Benjamin Collyer (Acting Assistant Director of Music)
- 2025 Dewi Rees

== St Edmundsbury Cathedral ==
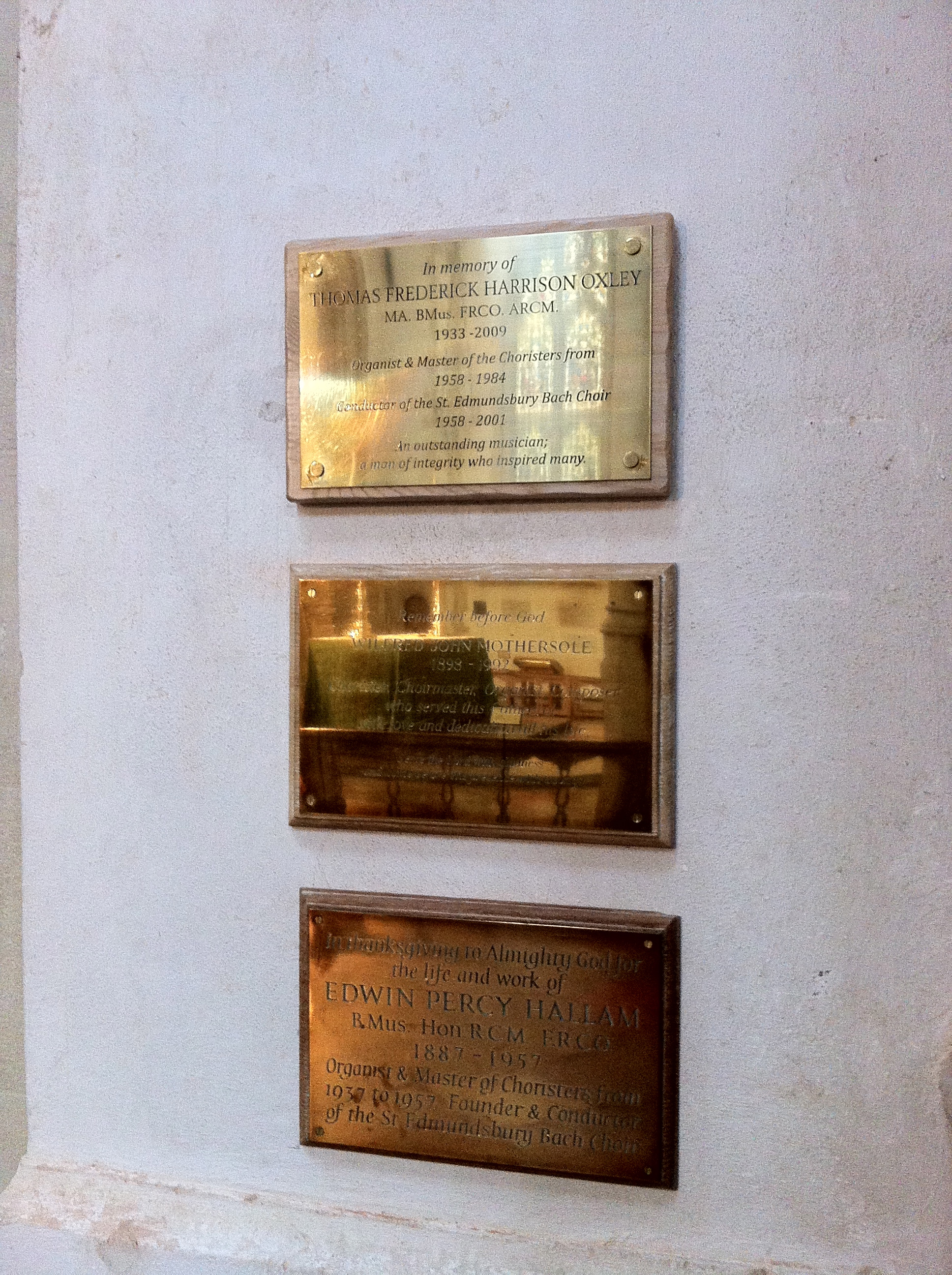
Plaques in memory of Harrison Oxley, Wilfred Mothersole and Percy Hallam in St Edmundsbury Cathedral, at the foot of the steps to the organ loft

This list of organists of St Edmundsbury Cathedral also includes organists of the parish church of St James before it was elevated to Cathedral status in 1914 with the creation of the Diocese of St Edmundsbury and Ipswich.

=== Organists and Directors of Music ===
- 1760 Mr Nair
- 1785 Thomas Harrington
- 1815 John Harrington
- 1841 Philip Harrington
- 1863 Frederick Fearnside
- 1877 Mr Sydenham
- 1883 Edward Iles
- 1892 Revd J Lord
- 1896 Harold Shann
- 1937 Percy Hallam
- 1958 Harrison Oxley
- 1985 Paul Trepte
- 1990 Mark Blatchly
- 1993 Mervyn Cousins
- 1997 James Thomas
- 2020-2021 Vacant
- 2021 Timothy Parsons
- 2024 Claudia Grinnell

=== Assistant Organists and Assistant Directors of Music ===
- 1867–1877 B Fearnside
- 1917 Wilfred Mothersole
- 1971 Mary Slatter
- 1973 John Scott Whiteley
- 1975 Geoffrey Hannant
- 1986 Mervyn Cousins
- 1993 Scott Farrell
- 1999 Michael Bawtree
- 2004 Jonathan Vaughn
- 2007 David Humphreys
- 2011 Daniel Soper
- 2016 Alexander Binns
- 2019 Richard Cook

== Salisbury Cathedral ==
Among the notable organists of Salisbury Cathedral have been a number of composers and well-known performers including Bertram Luard-Selby, Charles Frederick South, Sir Walter Galpin Alcock, Sir David Valentine Willcocks, Douglas Guest, Christopher Hugh Dearnley, Richard Godfrey Seal and the BBC presenter Simon Lole.

=== Organists ===
- 1463 John Kegewyn
- 1563 Robert Chamberlayne
- 1568 Thomas Smythe
- 1587 John Farrant (Senior)
- 1592 Richard Fuller
- 1598 John Farrant (Junior)
- 1602–1610 John Holmes (previously organist of Winchester Cathedral)
- 1618 Edward Tucker
- 1629 Giles Tompkins
- 1668–1687 Michael Wise
- 1689 Peter Isaacke
- 1692–1698 Daniel Roseingrave
- 1700 Anthony Walkley
- 1718 Edward Thompson
- 1746 John Stevens
- 1781 Robert Parry
- 1792 Joseph Corfe
- 1804 Arthur Thomas Corfe
- 1863 John Elliott Richardson
- 1881 Bertram Luard-Selby
- 1883 Charles Frederick South
- 1916 Sir Walter Galpin Alcock
- 1947 David Valentine Willcocks (later knighted)
- 1950 Douglas Albert Guest
- 1957 Christopher Hugh Dearnley
- 1968 Richard Godfrey Seal
- 1997 Simon Lole
- 2005 David Halls (Director of Music)

=== Assistant Organists ===
- 1845?–1863 John Elliott Richardson (then organist)
- Thomas Bentinck Richardson (later organist of St Mary's Church, Bury St Edmunds
- 1881–1884 Albert Edward Wilshire
- 1886–1889 George Street Chignell
- 1917 Herbert Howells
- 1917–1927 Cuthbert Edward Osmond (later organist of St Albans Cathedral)
- 1933–1947 Reginald Moore (later organist of Exeter Cathedral)
- 1947–1950 John Charles Stirling Forster
- 1947–1954 Ronald Tickner
- 1954–1957 Christopher Hugh Dearnley (later organist here, subsequently organist of St Paul's Cathedral, London)
- 1957–1966 Richard Hey Lloyd
- 1967–1974 Michael John Smith (then organist of Llandaff Cathedral)
- 1974–1978 Jonathan Rees-Williams (later organist of Lichfield Cathedral and St George's Chapel, Windsor Castle)
- 1978–1985 Colin Walsh (later organist of St Albans Cathedral and Lincoln Cathedral)
- 1985–2005 David Halls (later organist, now Director of Music)
- 2005–2011 Daniel Cook (Assistant Director of Music, later Sub-Organist of Westminster Abbey, now Organist of Durham Cathedral)
- 2011–2012 Vacant
- 2012–present John Challenger (Assistant Director of Music)

== Sheffield Cathedral ==
Notable organists at Sheffield Cathedral have included Edwin Lemare and Reginald Tustin Baker.

=== Organists and Directors of Music ===
- 1805 John Mather
- 1810 Jonathan Blewitt
- 1811 Robert Bennett
- 1819 John Camidge
- 1819 Mr Gledhill
- 1820 Joseph Bottomley
- 1860 George Henry Smith
- 1875 Thomas Tallis Trimnell
- 1886 Edwin Lemare
- 1892 Thomas William Hanforth
- 1937 Reginald Tustin Baker
- 1967 Graham Hedley Matthews
- 1991 Paul Brough
- 1994 Simon Lole
- 1997 Neil Taylor
- 2016 Joshua Hales (acting)
- 2017 Tom Corns
- 2019 Joshua Stephens (acting)
- 2020 Ian Seddon (acting)
- 2023 Chris Why (acting)
- 2023 Tom Daggett

=== Assistant Directors of Music ===
- 2013 Joshua Hales
- 2016 Joshua Stephens (acting)
- 2018 James Kealey (Interim)
- 2018 Joshua Stephens
- 2020 Ian Seddon
- 2023 James Mitchell

=== Assistant Master of the Music ===
- 1992–1995 Tim Horton
- 1995–1999 Chris Betts
- 1999 Mark Pybus
- 1999–2005 Peter Heginbotham
- 2005–2012 Anthony Gowing

=== Sub Organists ===
- ?–1976 Hubert Stafford
- 1975-1979 David G Read
- 1979–1985 Paul Parsons
- 1989–1992 Martin Colton

== Southwark Cathedral ==
Among the organists of Southwark Cathedral are Edgar Tom Cook, known for his lunchtime organ broadcasts on the BBC, and the organ designer and noted teacher Ralph Downes.

=== Organists ===
- 1897 Alfred Madeley Richardson
- 1908 Edgar Tom Cook
- 1953 Sidney Schofield Campbell
- 1956 Harold Dexter
- 1968 Ernest Herbert Warrell
- 1976 Harry Wakefield Bramma
- 1989 Peter Wright
- 2019-2024 Ian Keatley
- 2025 Helen Smee

=== Assistant Organists ===
- F. Stanley Winter
- 1908–1917 Charles Edgar Ford
- 1917–1922 Francis W. Sutton
- 1922 J.C. Bradshaw 1922
- 1923–1925 Ralph William Downes (later Organist of the London Oratory, Brompton, organ consultant and designer, including designer and curator of the Royal Festival Hall organ)
- 1934–1935 Philip Miles
- 1936 Ernest F.A. Suttle
- 1937–1954 Ernest Herbert Warrell
- 1955–1956 William Allen Humpherson
- 1957–1959 Denys Darlow
- 1959–1962 John Flower, Alan Dance, John Oxlade
- 1962–1970 Arthur Newell
- 1971–1974 Christopher Jenkins
- 1975–1978 Nicholas Woods
- 1978–1985 John Scott
- 1985–1988 Andrew Lumsden
- 1988–1997 Stephen Layton
- 1997-2022 Stephen Disley
- 2022- Simon Hogan (Sub Organist and Assistant Director of Music)

== Southwell Minster ==
At Southwell Minster, the term Rector Chori is used rather than Director of Music, or Master of the Choristers. It literally means Ruler of the Choir, and is an historic title.

=== Rectores Chori ===
- 1499 Lawrence Pepys
- 1519 Rev George Vincent
- 1568 George Thetford
- 1582 John Mudd
- 1584 Thomas Foster
- 1586 William Colbecke
- 1594 John Beeston
- 1596 Edward Manestie
- 1622 Francis Dogson
- 1628 John Hutchinson
- 1661 Edward Chappell
- 1690 George Chappell
- 1699 William Popeley
- 171? William Lee
- 1754 Samuel Wise
- 1755 Edmund Ayrton
- 1764–1781 Thomas Spofforth
- 1818 Edward Heathcote
- 1835 Frederick Gunton
- 1841 Chappell Batchelor
- 1857 Herbert Stephen Irons
- 1872 Cedric Bucknall
- 1876 William Weaver Ringrose
- 1879 W. Arthur Marriott
- 1888 Robert William Liddle
- 1918 Harry William Tupper
- 1929 George Thomas Francis
- 1946 Robert Ashfield
- 1956 David Lumsden
- 1959 Kenneth Beard
- 1989 Paul Hale
- 2016 Simon Hogan (acting)
- 2017 Paul Provost (formerly Sub-Organist of Guildford Cathedral)

=== Organists ===
Assistant Organists:

- ????-1861 W.D. Hall
- W.L. Dodd 1861–1865 (afterwards organist of St Alkmund's Church, Derby)
- ca. 1868 E.D. Hoe
- ca. 1870 H. Nicholson
- ????-1885 G. Fletcher
- 1890–1897 Alfred Winterbotham
- 1897–1902 Lawrence Frederick Baguley
- 1903–1904 Sydney Weale (formerly assistant organist at the Church of St. Mary Magdalene, Newark-on-Trent)
- Oswald Steele
- Cecil Wyer ???? – 1919
- 1958–1994 Peter Wood
- 1994–2002 Philip Rushforth (now Director of Music at Chester Cathedral)
- 2002–08 Simon Bell (later Assistant Director of Music at Winchester Cathedral, now Director of Music of the Schola Cantorum at Tewkesbury Abbey)

In 2008 the title of Assistant Organist was replaced with Assistant Director of Music, in line with other Cathedrals. Assistant Directors of Music:

- 2008–2012 Philip White-Jones (previously Assistant Organist at Winchester Cathedral)
- 2012–2019 Simon Hogan (previously Organ Scholar at St Paul's Cathedral)
- 2019–present Jonathan Allsopp (previously Organ Scholar at Westminster Cathedral)

== Truro Cathedral ==
The Diocese of Truro was established in 1876 and Truro Cathedral was consecrated in 1887. The parish church of St Mary the Virgin occupied the site before the cathedral was built, and had an organ: its organists included Charles William Hempel and his son Charles Frederick Hempel.

=== Organists and Masters of the Choristers ===
- 1881 George Robertson Sinclair (later organist of Hereford Cathedral : the G. R. S. of Elgar's Enigma Variations)
- 1890 Mark James Monk
- 1920 Hubert Stanley Middleton (later organist of Ely Cathedral and Trinity College, Cambridge)
- 1926 John Dykes Bower (later Sir John Dykes Bower organist of St Paul's Cathedral, London)
- 1929 Guillaume Ormond
- 1971 John Charles Winter (later Organist Emeritus)
- 1989 David Briggs (later organist of Gloucester Cathedral)
- 1994 Andrew Nethsingha (currently Director of Music at Westminster Abbey)
- 2002 Robert Sharpe (currently Director of Music at York Minster)
- 2008 Christopher Gray (currently Director of Music at St. John's College, Cambridge)
- 2023 James Anderson-Besant

=== Assistant Organists ===
- 1885–1886 Ivor Atkins (later knighted, and Organist of Worcester Cathedral)
- 1902–1907 Frederick Rowland Tims
- 1907–1911 William Stanley Sutton
- 1911 Mr. Hall
- Donald Behenna
- 1922–1926 Gerald Hocken Knight (later Organist of Canterbury Cathedral and subsequently Director of the Royal School of Church Music)
- Arthur William Baines
- 1950–1971 John Charles Winter (later Organist and Organist Emeritus)
- 1971–1991 Henry Doughty
- 1991–2000 Simon Morley
- 2000–2008 Christopher Gray
- 2008–2017 Luke Bond
- 2017–2019 Joseph Wicks
- 2019–2020 Michael Butterfield
- 2020–present Andrew Wyatt

== Wakefield Cathedral ==
Organist of Wakefield Cathedral have included the following.

=== Organists ===
- 1886 Joseph Naylor Hardy
- 1930–1945 Newell Smith Wallbank
- 1945–1970 Percy George Saunders
- 1970–2010 Jonathan Bielby
- 2010–2020 Thomas Moore
- 2020–2021 James Bowstead (Acting)
- 2021- 2022 Ed Jones
- 2023-2026 James Bowstead
- 2026 Alana Brook (Acting)

=== Assistant Organists ===
- 1897–1900 William Frederick Dunnill
- 1961–1971 John Holt
- 1975–1983 Peter David Gould
- 1983–1985 Gareth Green
- 1985–1991 Keith Wright
- 1991–1996 Sean Farrell
- 1996–2002 Louise Reid (née Marsh)
- 2002–2010 Thomas Moore
- 2010 Daniel Justin
- 2011–2015 Simon Earl
- 2015–2017 Sachin Gunga
- 2018–2020 James Bowstead
- 2020–2021 Robert Pecksmith
- 2021-2023 James Bowstead
- 2023- Alana Brook

== Westminster Abbey ==
Westminster Abbey, formally titled the Collegiate Church of St Peter at Westminster, is a large, mainly Gothic abbey church in the City of Westminster in London, located close to the Palace of Westminster. It is the traditional site for the coronation of the British monarch, for royal weddings and funerals and for other state occasions. In addition, the organist oversees the music for daily services sung by a choir of 12 professional adults and up to 30 boys from the adjacent choir school.

The present organ was installed in 1937 and was built by Harrison & Harrison. The fifth manual was a later addition, added during the 1982-1984 rebuild, with the Bombarde pipework being installed in 1987. The organ case, however, is from the previous Hill organ (which were donated by Mr J.L. Pearson).

=== Organists and Masters of the Choristers ===
- 1559: John Taylour
- 1570: Robert White
- 1574: Henry Leeve
- 1585: Edmund Hooper
- 1621: John Parsons
- 1623: Orlando Gibbons
- 1625−1644: Richard Portman
- 1660: Christopher Gibbons
- 1666: Albertus Bryne
- 1668: John Blow
- 1679: Henry Purcell
- 1695: John Blow (reappointed)
- 1708: William Croft
- 1727: John Robinson
- 1762: Benjamin Cooke
- 1793: Samuel Arnold
- 1803: Robert Cooke
- 1814: George Ebenezer Williams
- 1819: Thomas Greatorex
- 1831: James Turle
- 1882: Sir Frederick Bridge,
- 1918: Sir Sydney Nicholson,
- 1928: Sir Ernest Bullock
- 1941−1945: Osborne Harold Peasgood (acting)
- 1941: Sir William Neil McKie
- 1963: Douglas Guest
- 1981: Simon Preston
- 1988: Martin Neary (acting, 1988−1989)
- 2000: James O'Donnell
- 2023: Andrew Nethsingha

=== Sub-Organists ===
- 1860: Charles Sherwood Jekyll
- 1875: Sir Frederick Bridge
- 1881: Henry Davan Wetton
- 1896: Sir Walter Galpin Alcock
- 1917: Stanley Roper
- 1921: Osborne Harold Peasgood
- 1941−1946: vacant
- 1946: Osborne Harold Peasgood
- 1954: Derek Holman
- 1956: Robert Henry Charles Palmer
- 1962: Simon Preston
- 1967: Tim Farrell
- 1974: Sir Stephen Cleobury
- 1978: Christopher Herrick
- 1984: Harry Bicket
- 1988: Iain Simcock
- 1988: Andrew Lumsden
- 1992: Martin Baker
- 1998: Philip Scriven (acting)
- 2000: Andrew Reid
- 2004: Robert Quinney
- 2013: Daniel Cook
- 2017: Peter Holder
- 2024: Matthew Jorysz

=== Assistant Organists ===
- 1875: Charles Sherwood Jekyll
- 1886−1895: W.J. Winter
- 1896−1916: Walter Alcock
- 1947−1950: Hugh Marchant
- 1950−1959: Hugo Limer
- 1959−1984: Rilford Trafalgar
- 1968−1974: David Bruce-Payne
- dates unknown: Christopher Herrick
- 1978−1988: Geoffrey Morgan (later sub-organist at Guildford Cathedral, then organist at Christchurch Priory)
- 1989−1991: Miles Quick
- 1991−2001: Stephen Le Prevost (later organist and director of music at the Town Church in Saint Peter Port, Guernsey)
- 2001−2002: Simon Bell (later assistant director of music at Winchester Cathedral, then director of Schola Cantorum, Tewkesbury Abbey)
- 2003−2005: Daniel Cook
- 2005−2008: Ashley Grote
- 2008−2011: James McVinnie
- 2011−2015: Martin Ford
- 2016−2024: Matthew Jorysz
- 2024- Paul Greally

=== Organ Scholars ===
- James Cryer
- Jonathan Dimmock
- Adrian Lenthall
- Simon Morley (later assistant organist at Lincoln Cathedral, then organist of Ripon Cathedral)
- Geoffrey Styles (later organ scholar at Christ Church Cathedral, Oxford)
- Nick Murdoch
- 1981−1982: Jane Watts
- 1990−1992: Richard Moorhouse (later organist at Llandaff Cathedral)
- 1992−1993: Meirion Wynn Jones (later assistant organist at Brecon Cathedral)
- 1993−1994: William Whitehead
- 1994−1996: Louise Reid
- 1996−1999: John Hosking (later assistant organist at St Asaph Cathedral)
- 1999−2000: Iestyn Evans (later organist st St James's, Spanish Place, London)
- 2000−2001: Simon Bell
- 2001−2002: Justin Luke
- 2002−2003: Daniel Cook
- 2003−2004: Richard Hills (later organist of St Mary's, Bourne Street, London)
- 2004−2006: Ian Keatley (later organist at Christ Church Cathedral, Dublin)
- 2006−2007: Simon Jacobs
- 2007−2008: Benjamin Chewter (later assistant organist at Lincoln Cathedral, then assistant organist at Chester Cathedral)
- 2008−2009: Léon Charles
- 2009−2010: Samuel Prouse
- 2010−2011: Edward Tambling (later assistant organist at St James's Church, Spanish Place, London)
- 2011−2012: Andrej Kouznetsov (later organist at St John's Cathedral, Brisbane)
- 2012−2014: Peter Holder (later sub-organist of Westminster Abbey)
- 2014−2015: Jeremy Woodside
- 2015−2016: Matthew Jorysz
- 2016−2018: Benjamin Cunningham (later assistant director of chapel music, Winchester College)
- 2018−2020: Alexander Hamilton (later assistant organist at Wells Cathedral)
- 2020−2022: Charles Maxtone-Smith
- 2022−2023: Dewi Rees (later Assistant Director of Music at St Albans Cathedral)
- 2023−2024: Carolyn Craig (later Assistant Director of Music at Wells Cathedral)
- 2025- : Francois Cloete

== Wells Cathedral ==
The first record of an organ at Wells Cathedral dates from 1310, with a smaller organ, probably for the Lady Chapel, being installed in 1415. In 1620 a new organ, built by Thomas Dallam, was installed at a cost of £398 1s 5d, however this was destroyed by parliamentary soldiers in 1643 and another new organ was built in 1662, which was enlarged in 1786, and again rebuilt in 1855, a substantial early work of 'Father' Henry Willis. In 1909–1910 a new organ was built by Harrison & Harrison with the best parts of the old organ retained (approximately one-third of the stops being by Willis), and this has been maintained by the same company since.

=== Organists ===
- 1416–1418 Walter Bagele (or Vageler)
- 1421–1422 Robert Cator
- 1428–1431 John Marshal
- 1437–1462 John Marchell
- 1461–1462 John Menyman (joint)
- 1461–1462 Richard Hygons (joint)
- 1497–1507 Richard Hygons
- 1507–1508 Richard Bramston
- 1508 John Clawsy (or Clavelleshay)
- 1514 William Mylwhard
- 1515–1531 Richard Bramston
- 1534–1538 John Smyth
- 1547–1554 Nicholas Prynne
- 1556–1557 John Marker
- 1558 Robert Awman
- 1559–1562 William Lyde
- 1563 Thomas Tanner
- 1568 Matthew Nailer
- 1587 John Clerk
- 1600 Thomas Hunt
- 1608 James Weare
- 1613 Edmund Tucker
- 1614 Richard Brown
- 1619–1642 John Oker (or Okeover)
- Commonwealth period (1642-1663)
- 1663 John Brown
- 1674 Mr Hall
- 1674 John Jackson
- 1688 Robert Hodge
- 1690 John George
- 1713 William Broderip
- 1726 Joseph Millard
- 1727 William Evans
- 1741 Jacob Nickells
- 1741 John Broderip
- 1771 Peter Parfitt
- 1773 Robert Parry
- 1781 Dodd Perkins
- 1820 William Perkins
- 1859 Charles Williams Lavington
- 1896 Percy Carter Buck
- 1899 Revd. Canon Thomas Henry Davis
- 1933 Conrad William Eden
- 1936 Denys Pouncey
- 1971 Anthony Crossland
- 1996 Malcolm Archer
- 2004 Rupert Gough (acting)
- 2005 Matthew Owens
- 2020–2022 Jeremy Cole (acting Organist and Master of the Choristers since 2017)
- 2023–2024 Alexander Hamilton (Acting Director of Music)
- 2024- Timothy Parsons

=== Assistant Organists ===
- 1842–1859 Charles William Lavington
- J. Summers
- c. 1880 Frederick Joseph William Crowe (later organist of Chichester Cathedral) c.1880
- 1894–1895 Charles Harry Moody (then acting organist 1895)
- 1896–1897 Frederick William Heck (afterwards organist of Bedminster Parish Church)
- W. J. Bown
- 1904–1906 Richard John Maddern-Williams (later sub-organist of Norwich Cathedral).
- 1906 Kenneth J Miller
- 1908 Edward Percival Oxley (afterwards organist of St Paul's Church, Birmingham)
- 1908 F.P. Wheeldon
- Frank W. Porkess
- 1920–1925 Marmaduke Conway (later organist of Ely Cathedral)
- 1926–1927 C.H. Trevor
- 1927–1933 Conrad William Eden (then organist here and later organist of Durham Cathedral)
- 1938 J.W. Martindale-Sidwell (later organist of St Clement Danes, London)
- 1946–1953 Michael Peterson
- 1961–1970 Anthony Crossland (later organist)
- 1977–1983 David Anthony Cooper (later organist of Blackburn Cathedral)
- 1983–1990 Christopher Brayne (later organist of Bristol Cathedral)
- David Ponsford
- 1990–1994 Andrew Nethsingha
- 1994–2005 Rupert Gough
- 2002–2007 David Bednall (Senior Organ Scholar 2002 – 2004)
- 2007–2017 Jonathan Vaughn
- 2017–2019 Jeremy Cole
- 2019–2020 James Gough (temporary)
- 2020– Alexander Hamilton (Assistant Director of Music)
- 2023–2023 Adam Wilson (Acting Assistant Director of Music)
- 2024- Carolyn Craig

=== Sub-Assistant Organists ===
- 2019–2020 David Stevens (formerly Organist and Master of the Choristers of Belfast Cathedral)
- 2021 Adam Wilson (formerly Acting Assistant Master of the Music of St Mary's Cathedral, Edinburgh (Episcopal))

== Winchester Cathedral ==
The earliest known organist of Winchester Cathedral is John Dyer in 1402. Later organists include Christopher Gibbons whose patronage aided the revival of church music after the Interregnum, John Reading, Daniel Roseingrave, James Kent, Samuel Sebastian Wesley, the composer of sacred music, who was also responsible for the acquisition of the Cathedral organ, Martin Neary, who arranged the music for the funeral of Diana, Princess of Wales, and choral director David Hill.

=== Organists ===
Organists were formerly titled "Organist and Master of the Choristers" then, briefly, "Organist and Master of the Music" and now "Organist and Director of Music"

- 1402 John Dyer
- ???? Richard Wynslade
- 1572 John Langton
- ???? John Holmes
- 1602 John Lante
- 1615 George Bath
- 1631 Thomas Holmes
- 1638 Christopher Gibbons
- 1661 John Silver
- 1666 Randolph Jewitt
- 1675 John Reading
- 1681 Daniel Roseingrave
- 1693 Vaughan Richardson
- 1729 John Bishop
- 1737 James Kent
- 1774 Peter Fussell
- 1802 George William Chard (also Mayor of Winchester)
- 1849 Samuel Sebastian Wesley
- 1865 George Benjamin Arnold
- 1902 William Prendergast
- 1933 Harold Rhodes
- 1949 Reginald Alwyn Surplice
- 1972 Martin Neary
- 1988 David Hill
- 2002 Andrew Lumsden
- 2024 Andrew Lucas (interim Director of Music)
- 2026 Katherine Dienes-Williams

=== Assistant Organists ===
Sometimes the appointment has been as "Sub-organist" or, in recent years, "Assistant Director of Music"

- 1787–1802 George William Chard (later Organist)
- 1851–1854 George Mursell Garrett (later Organist of Madras Cathedral, subsequently Organist of St John's College, Cambridge and Organist to Cambridge University)
- 1863–?? Thomas Somerford
- ????-1869 E. H. Birch
- 1876 Charles Lee Williams (later Organist of Llandaff Cathedral and Gloucester Cathedral)
- William Prendergast (later Organist)
- 1898–?? Alfred Ernest Floyd
- E. Gilbert
- 1902–1904 Louis H. Torr
- 1906 George C. Macklin
- 1906–1913 Howard Roscoe Eady
- 1908–?? James Frederick Parsons
- Henry William Radford
- 1912–1921 Henry William Stubbington (later Organist of St Martin in the Bull Ring, Birmingham)
- 1919 Hilda Bird
- Horace Hawkins (later organist of Chichester Cathedral)
- W. Brennand Smith
- Cyril John Tucker Fogwell
- Gillian Skottowe (now Gillian Earl)
- 1958–1967 Graham Hedley Matthews (later Organist of Sheffield Cathedral)
- 1967–?? Clement McWilliam
- 1975–1985 James Lancelot (later Organist and Master of the Choristers at Durham Cathedral, also Lay Canon and now Lay Canon Organist Emeritus there also, from September 2018, Interim Director of Music at Worcester Cathedral)
- 1985–1991 Timothy Byram-Wigfield (later successively Organist of St Mary's Cathedral, Edinburgh (Episcopal), Jesus College, Cambridge, St George's Chapel, Windsor Castle, and All Saints, Margaret Street, London)
- 1991–1996 David Dunnett (later Organist and Master of the Music at Norwich Cathedral)
- 1996–1998 Stephen Farr (later Organist and Master of the Choristers at Guildford Cathedral, Organist of Worcester College, Oxford and from April 2020 Organist and Director of Music All Saints, Margaret Street, London)
- 1999–2002 Philip Scriven (later Organist and Master of Choristers at Lichfield Cathedral)
- 2002–2008 Sarah Baldock (later Organist and Master of Choristers at Chichester Cathedral)
- 2003–2008 Philip White-Jones (later Assistant Director of Music at Southwell Minster)
- 2008 Richard McVeigh (Assistant Organist)
- 2008–2012 Simon Bell (Assistant Director of Music, later Director of Music of the 'Schola Cantorum' at Tewkesbury Abbey)
- 2012–2021 George Castle (Assistant Director of Music)
- 2017 Richard Moore (Assistant Organist)
- 2017-2024 Claudia Grinnell (Assistant Organist 2017-2021) (Sub-Organist 2021-2024)
- 2022- Joshua Stephens (Sub-Organist)
- 2024- Oliver Morrell (Sub Organist)

== Worcester Cathedral ==
Organists of Worcester Cathedral have included Sir Ivor Atkins, Douglas Guest, Christopher Robinson, the composers Thomas Tomkins, William Hayes, Hugh Blair, and conductors Sir David Willcocks, Donald Hunt and Adrian Lucas.

=== Organists (and Directors of Music from 2012) ===
- 1240 Thomas the Organist
- 1415 T. Hulet
- 1468 Richard Grene
- 1484 John Hampton
- 1522 Daniel Boyse
- 1541 Richard Fisher
- 1569 John Golden
- 1581 Nathaniel Giles
- 1585 Robert Cotterell
- 1590 Nathaniel Patrick
- 1595 John Fido
- 1596 Thomas Tomkins
- 1649 Vacant
- 1661 Giles Tomkins
- 1662 Richard Browne
- 1664 Richard Davis
- 1686 Vaughan Richardson
- 1688 Richard Cherington
- 1724 John Hoddinott
- 1731 William Hayes
- 1734 John Merifield
- 1747 Elias Isaac
- 1793 Thomas Pitt
- 1806 Jeremiah Clark
- 1807 William Kenge
- 1813 Charles E. J. Clarke
- 1844 William Done
- 1895 Hugh Blair
- 1897 Sir Ivor Atkins
- 1950 David Willcocks (later knighted)
- 1957 Douglas Guest
- 1963 Christopher Robinson
- 1974 Donald Hunt
- 1996 Adrian Lucas
- 2012 Christopher Allsop (Acting Director of Music)
- 2012–2018 Peter Nardone
- 2019 Samuel Hudson

=== Assistant Organists (and Assistant Directors of Music from 2012) ===
- 1835–1844 William Done (later organist)
- 1846–1847 John Roberts Boulcott
- c. 1860 Alfred James Caldicott
- 1865 Robert Taylor
- ????-1876 William Edward Wadeley
- 1879 Mr. Garton
- James Henry Caseley (later organist of Holy Trinity Church, Stratford-upon-Avon)
- Henry Holloway
- 1887–1895 Hugh Blair (later organist)
- 1893–1899 Frank Alfred Charles Mason
- 1893–1896 George Street Chignell
- 1904–1909 Edgar Thomas Cook (later organist of Southwark Cathedral)
- ????-1912 Alexander E. Brent Smith
- 1912–1962 Edgar F.Day
- 1962–1963 Christopher Robinson (later organist; then successively organist of St. George’s Chapel, Windsor Castle and St John's College, Cambridge)
- 1963–1976 Harry Bramma (later organist of Southwark Cathedral)
- 1976–1981 Paul Trepte (later organist of Ely Cathedral)
- 1981–1991 Adrian Partington (later organist of Gloucester Cathedral)
- 1991–1998 Raymond Johnston (later Canon Musician of St Mark’s Episcopal Cathedral, Minneapolis)
- 1998–2004 Daniel Phillips
- 2004–2018 Christopher Allsop (subsequently Assistant Director of Music, King's School, Worcester and Organist of Eton College)
- 2018– Nicholas Freestone

=== Sub-Assistant Organists (and Voluntary Choir Choirmasters) ===
- 2007–2008 Simon Bertram
- 2008–2012 George Castle (later Assistant Director of Music at Winchester Cathedral)
- 2012–2014 James Luxton (later Assistant Director of Music at Liverpool Metropolitan Cathedral)
- 2014–2016 Justin Miller
- 2017–2019 Richard Cook
- 2019–2021 Ed Jones

=== Organists of the Worcester Cathedral Voluntary Choir ===
- 1981–2021 John Wilderspin

== York Minster ==
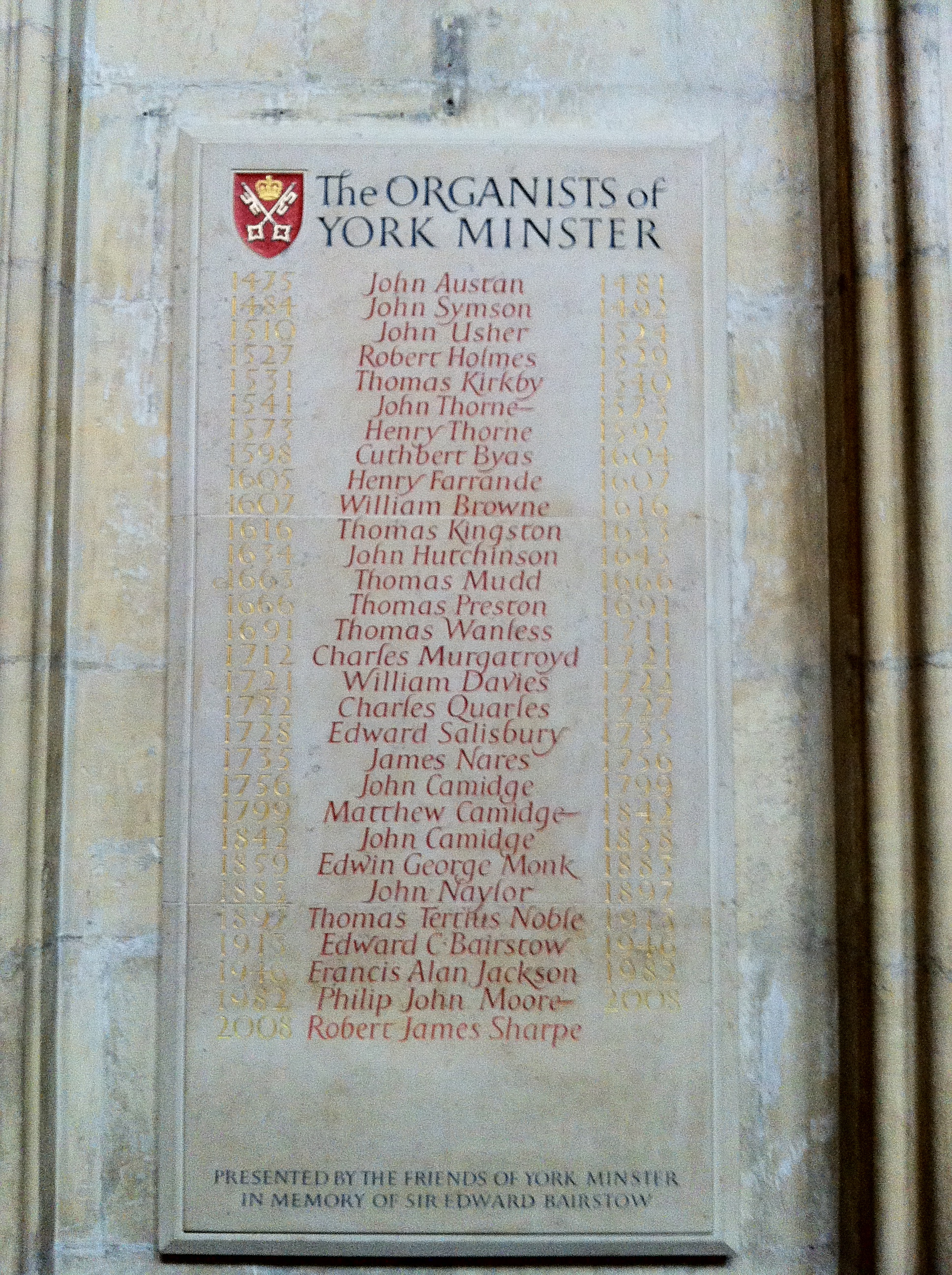
List of the organists of York Minster on the wall of the north transept

Among the notable organists of York Minster are four members of the Camidge family who served as cathedral organists for over 100 years, and a number of composers including James Nares, Edwin George Monk, John Naylor, Thomas Tertius Noble and Francis Jackson.

=== Organists ===
The organists of York Minster have had several official titles, including "Master of the Music"; the job description roughly equates to that of Organist and Master of the Choristers. They will have an Assistant Organist, who may be titled simply "Organist". The names of Organists prior to 1633 have been copied from the list of Organists of York Minster on the wall of the North Transept.

- 1475 John Austan
- 1484 John Symson
- 1510 John Usher
- 1527 Robert Holmes
- 1531 Thomas Kirkby
- 1541 John Thorne
- 1573 Henry Thorne
- 1598 Cuthbert Byas
- 1605 Henry Farrande
- 1607 William Browne
- 1616 Thomas Kingston
- 1633 James Hutchinson
- 1662 J. H. Charles
- 1667 Thomas Preston
- 1691 Thomas Wanless
- 1695 J.Heath
- 1715 Charles Murgatroyd
- 1721 William Davies
- 1722 Charles Quarles
- 1734 James Nares
- 1756 John Camidge
- 1799 Matthew Camidge
- 1842 John Camidge
- 1848 Thomas Simpson Camidge
- 1859 Edwin George Monk
- 1883 John Naylor
- 1897 Thomas Tertius Noble
- 1913 Sir Edward Bairstow
- 1946 Francis Jackson
- 1983 Philip Moore
- 2008 Robert Sharpe

=== Assistant Organists ===
- 1842–1848 Thomas Simpson Camidge
- ????-1878 Edward Johnson Bellerby
- ????-1879 Mark James Monk
- 1891–1892 Thomas William Hanforth
- 1892 Charles Legh Naylor
- ????-1902 Frederick Flaxington Harker
- 1902–1906 Edwin Fairbourn
- 1906–1910 William Green
- 1910–1914 Cyril Francis Musgrove
- 1917–1923 Harold Aubie Bennett
- 1924–1929 J. Lawrence Slater
- 1929–1941, 1946 Owen Le Patourel Franklin
- 1946 Francis Jackson (later Organist and Master of the Music)
- 1947–1954 Allan Wicks (later organist of Canterbury Cathedral)
- 1954–1957 Eric Parsons
- 1957–1966 Ronald Edward Perrin (later organist of Ripon Cathedral)
- 1966–1967 Peter J. Williams
- 1969–1971 A. Wilson Dixon
- 1971–1975 Geoffrey Coffin
- 1976–2002 John Scott Whiteley (Organist, 2001–2010)
- 2010–2016 David Pipe (later organist of Leeds Cathedral)
- 2016 Benjamin Morris

=== Assisting Organists ===
- 2016–2018 Jeremy Lloyd
- 2018–2020 Christopher Strange
- 2021–2023 Asher Oliver (Assistant Organist)
- 2023–Present Adam Wilson

== See also ==
- List of musicians at Welsh cathedrals
- List of Masters of the Children of the Chapel Royal
