= George Holmes (musician) =

English organist and composer

- Born: c. 1680
- Died: 1720; Lincoln, England
- Occupation: Organist

George Holmes (c. 1680 – 1720) was an English organist and composer.

== Biography ==
Holmes was a chorister at Durham Cathedral from 1688 to 1694. He was domestic organist to the Bishop of Durham afterwards, in 1698, and as successor to Thomas Allison, became organist of Lincoln Cathedral in 1704–5. In 1707 he was appointed there one of the junior vicars; and also was master of the Company of Ringers of the Blessed Virgin Mary of Lincoln. Holmes died in Lincoln in 1720.

== Works ==
Several compositions of Holmes are preserved in the British Library and the Cathedral Library in Lichfield. They are considered to be "among the best examples of English church music composed outside the Chapel Royal in the period immediately following Purcell."

== See also ==
- List of musicians at English cathedrals
