= Claudia Grinnell =

British organist and choir director

Claudia Grinnell is a British organist and choir director who has served as Director of Music at St Edmundsbury Cathedral in Suffolk, England, since 2024.

== Education and career ==
Claudia was raised in Wolverhampton and attended Wolverhampton Girls’ High School. After graduating from the University of Cambridge, where she was an organ scholar at Peterhouse, with a first class degree in music, Grinnell was the organ scholar at Salisbury Cathedral for a year before becoming assistant organist at Winchester Cathedral in 2017. Having served as assistant organist for four years, she became the cathedral's sub-organist in 2021. She had particular responsibility for the girl choristers and also taught at Winchester College.

In 2024 Grinnell became Director of Music at St Edmundsbury Cathedral in Bury St Edmunds, Suffolk. The first woman appointed to the role, she is responsible for the cathedral's five choirs as well as a programme of concerts and recitals.

Preceded by Timothy Parsons	Director of Music, St Edmundsbury Cathedral; 2024−present	Succeeded by
