= Joseph Bottomley =

English musician

Joseph Bottomley (1786–1861), was an English musician. He was born at Halifax in Yorkshire in 1786. His parentage is not recorded, but his musical education was begun at a very early age; when only seven years old he played a violin concerto in public. At the age of twelve he was sent to Manchester, where he studied under John Grimshaw (1765?-1819), organist of St. John's Church, and Watts, the leader of the concerts. Under Watts's direction he at the same time carried on his violin studies with Yaniewicz, then resident in Manchester.

In 1801 Bottomley was articled to David Lawton (d. 1807), the organist of St. Peter's, Leeds, and on the expiration of his term removed to London to study the piano under Wœlfl. In 1807 Bottomley returned to Yorkshire, and obtained the appointment of organist to the parish church of Bradford, but he made Halifax his home, where he had a large teaching connection. In 1820 he was appointed organist of Sheffield parish church, which post he held for some considerable time. The date of his death is uncertain. Bottomley published several original works, including 'Six Exercises for Pianoforte,' twelve sonatinas for the same instrument, two divertissements with flute accompaniment, twelve valses, eight rondos, ten airs variés, a duo for two pianos, and a small dictionary of music (8vo), published in London in 1816.

He died in 1861, Eccleshall Bierlow, Sheffield, Yorkshire citing his profession as a professor of music.
