= Daniel Henstridge =

English organist and composer

- Died: 1736
- Occupations: Organist and composer

Daniel Henstridge (died 1736) was an English organist and composer.

== Biography ==
Henstridge was organist of Rochester Cathedral for some years until 1700, when he succeeded Nicholas Wootton as organist of Canterbury Cathedral. Of his anthems very little besides a few organ parts still exist. Henstridge died in 1736, and was buried on 4 June in Canterbury Cathedral.

In a collection of manuscript anthems made by William Flackton, a Canterbury bookseller, and preserved in the British Museum Library, are several compositions by Henstridge. They include three hymns and an anthem in E minor for three voices, "Hear me when I call" (Addit. MS. 30932, Nos. 100, 101), in the handwriting of the composer; the organ part of his "Morning and Evening Service in D;" and an anthem, "The Lord is King" (Addit. MS. 30933, Nos. 20, 21).
