= Charles Quarles =

Musician (died 1727)

Charles Quarles (died 1727), musician, graduated Mus. Bac. at Cambridge in 1698. He was appointed organist of Trinity College, Cambridge. On 30 June 1722 he succeeded William Davies as organist of York Minster, and died in 1727. "A Lesson for Harpsichord" by Quarles, printed by Goodison about 1788, contains, among others of his compositions, an "exceedingly graceful" minuet in F minor.
