= Charles Francis =

Charles Francis may refer to:

- Charles Spencer Francis (1853–1911), United States ambassador to Greece
- Charles Robert Francis (1875–1946), U.S. Marine private who received the Medal of Honor
- Charles Cooper Francis (1884–1956), cathedral organist, who served at Peterborough Cathedral
- Charles Asa Francis (1855–1934), American politician in New Jersey
- Charles Francis (politician) (1924–2009), Australian politician
- Charles Francis (swimmer) (born 1988), Canadian swimmer
- Charles Francis (cricketer) (1851–1925), English cricketer
- Charlie Francis (Charles Merrick Francis, 1948–2010), Canadian Olympic sprinter and sprint coach
