= Mickey Mouse Weekly =

British Disney comics magazine

Publication information
- Publisher: Willbank Publications; Odhams Press
- Schedule: Weekly
- Format: Ongoing series
- Genre: Action/adventure, humor/comedy
- Publication date: 8 February 1936 – 28 December 1957
- No. of issues: 920
- Main character(s): Mickey Mouse; Donald Duck

Creative team
- Artist(s): Floyd Gottfredson (reprints), Frank Bellamy, Reg Carter, Ron Embleton, Wilfred Haughton, Jim Holdaway, Otto Messmer, Cecil Orr, Basil Reynolds, William A. Ward, Tony Weare

Mickey Mouse Weekly is a 1936–1957 weekly British tabloid Disney comics magazine, the first British comic with full colour photogravure printing. It was launched by Willbank Publications and later continued by Odhams Press. The comics were said to be "drawn in a slick, smooth style which was clearly influenced by American comics."

Mickey Mouse Weekly featured American reprints as well as original British Disney comics material, including the first Donald Duck comic book serial. The magazine also featured reprints of Floyd Gottfredson's Mickey Mouse comic strip continuities in full colour on the back cover.

920 issues of Mickey Mouse Weekly were published between 8 February 1936 and 28 December 1957.

== Publication history ==
Mickey Mouse Weekly was inspired by the 1935 launch of Mickey Mouse Magazine, the first American Disney newsstand publication. It began as a 12-page tabloid, with four pages in colour — the cover pages and the centrefold. The early covers were drawn by Wilfred Haughton — a full-colour comic panel with many characters, with each one saying a joke or a pun.

As the American Mickey Mouse Magazine inspired Mickey Mouse Weekly, the new publication inspired a number of European spinoffs, including Switzerland's Micky Maus Zeitung (1936–37) and Sweden's Musse Pigg Tidningen (1937–38), which used Haughton's covers and other British material.

The magazine ceased production with its 28 December 1957 issue after Odhams lost the rights to the Disney characters. Disney then published Walt Disney's Mickey Mouse with Vernon Holding; the relatively unsuccessful magazine was renamed Walt Disney's Weekly in 1959 and discontinued in 1961. Non-Disney content was continued in Odhams Press' Zip, a 1958 weekly which merged into Swift in 1959.

== Strips ==
=== The De(f)tective Agency ===
The first British Disney serial published in Mickey Mouse Weekly was The De(f)tective Agency — actually "The Defective Agency", but with the F crossed out, and T written in above. This one-page serial began in issue #45 (12 December 1936), and starred Goofy and Toby Tortoise, from the 1935 Silly Symphony short The Tortoise and the Hare, assisted by Pluto. The stories were written and drawn by Wilfred Haughton. The serial had four stories:

- The Disappearing Kids, issues #45–54 (12 December 1936 – 13 February 1937): The detectives investigate the kidnapping of "the famous Mickey quins", finally finding them with Peg Leg Pete, who begs the heroes to take the brats away again.
- Spooky Farm, issues #55–63 (20 February – 17 April 1937)
- A Tropical Trek, issues #68–85 (22 May – 18 September 1937): Goofy and Toby are captured by cannibals in the desert.
- Our De(f)tectives Meet Rivals, issues #86–103 (25 September 1937 – 22 January 1938): Goofy and Toby compete with a rival detective agency headed by Horace Horsecollar and Sammy Skunk.

=== Donald Duck ===
Considered the first Donald Duck comic book serial, originally called Donald and Donna, which began in issue #67 (15 May 1937), drawn by William A. Ward. There were 15 weekly parts of this first serial featuring Donald and his girlfriend Donna, an early version of Daisy Duck. Donna left the series after the first story, which was continued as Donald and Mac, Donald Duck and Donald Duck with Mac for the next three years, ending in issue #222 (4 May 1940). The Donald Duck strip itself continued until the magazine's closure in 1957.

=== Shuffled Symphonies ===
Shuffled Symphonies was an early illustrated text feature by Basil Reynolds, which initially paired a character from the Mickey Mouse cartoons with a character from the Silly Symphony shorts. Over time, it transitioned to stories about Mickey and friends embarking on science-fiction and fantasy-themed adventures, including a story about Donald, Mickey and Mickey's nephews traveling in a time machine to the future. The feature began in issue #1 (8 February 1936), and continued until at least #210 (10 February 1940). Reynolds left Mickey Mouse Weekly in 1940 for military service in World War II. After the war, he returned to the weekly in 1947, contributing off and on until 1954.

A card game called Shuffled Symphonies was produced in 1939 by Pepys Games, based on the title of this weekly feature. The cards featured full-colour images of the Mickey Mouse, Silly Symphony and Snow White cast.

=== Other strips ===
- Billy Brave (Tony Weare, 1950–57)
- Bobby and Chip (Otto Messmer)
- Bongo (Basil Reynolds)
- Danny the Lamb (Basil Reynolds)
- Davy Crockett (Jim Holdaway, 1955–57)
- Doc's Woodland Wonders (Basil Reynolds, 1948–49)
- Donald Duck (William Ward, 1937–57)
- Don o' the Drums (Ron Embleton, 1957)
- Gordon Gale, Air Rover (Stephen Chapman, 1936)
- Ian on Mu (Hugh Stanley White)
- Kidnapped (Joan Martin May, 1948)
- Li'l Wolf (Basil Reynolds)
- The Lone Ranger (reprinted American strip by Ed Kressy)
- Mickey Mouse (Wilfred Haughton, Victor Ibbetson, Ronald Nielsen, Basil Reynolds 1936–57)
- Monty Carstairs, Special Agent (Cecil Orr, Frank Bellamy, 1951–56)
- Mumbles (Basil Reynolds)
- Peter Puppet (Basil Reynolds)
- Robin Alone (E. O., 1950–57)
- Rogers' Rangers (Ron Embleton, 1953)
- Sea Shanties (Reg Carter)
- Secret in the Sands (Frank Bellamy, 1953)
- The Secret Seven (Enid Blyton & George Brook, began 21 July 1951)
- Shuffled Symphonies (Basil Reynolds)
- Skit, Skat and the Captain (Basil Reynolds, 1936–40)
- Strongbow the Mighty (Ron Embleton, 1954–57)
- Troubles of Father (Reg Carter)
- True-Life Adventures (Basil Reynolds)
- Walt Disney's Living Desert (Frank Bellamy, 1953)

== Spin-offs ==
Mickey Mouse Weekly had an annual 64-page December supplement for the first four years – Mickey Mouse Holiday Special in 1936, 1937 and 1938, and Mickey Mouse Christmas Special in 1939.
