= Dean of Derry =

Church of Ireland official

The Dean of Derry is based at St Columb's Cathedral, Derry in the Diocese of Derry and Raphoe in the Church of Ireland.

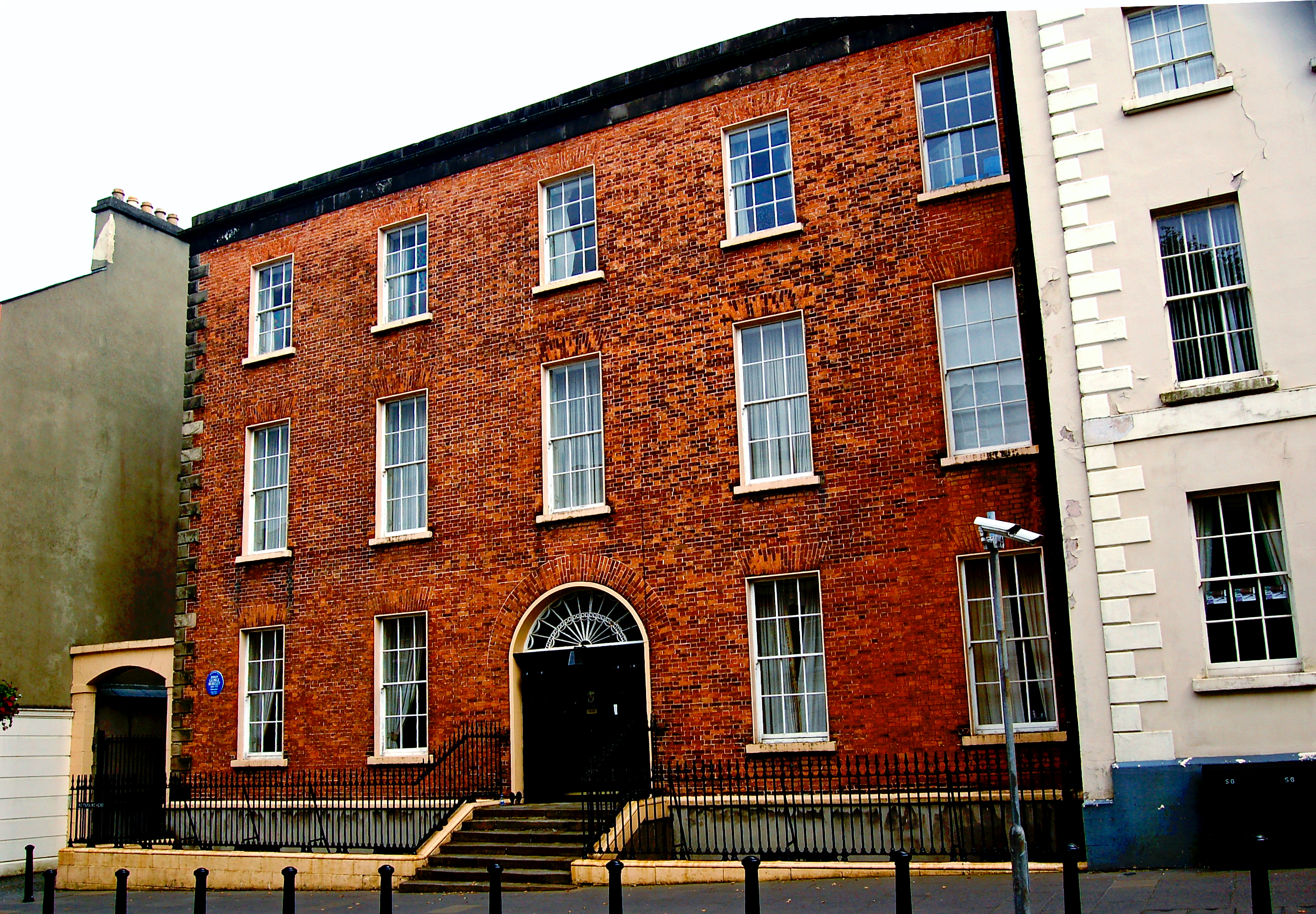
The Deanery

The current Dean of Derry is Raymond Stewart. He was appointed to the cathedral in December 2016 and inaugurated on 28 March 2017 by the Bishop of Derry and Raphoe, Kenneth Good.

Stewart succeeded William Morton who served as Dean of Derry for almost 20 years and then took on role as Dean of St Patrick's Cathedral in Dublin in September 2016.

== Deans of Derry ==
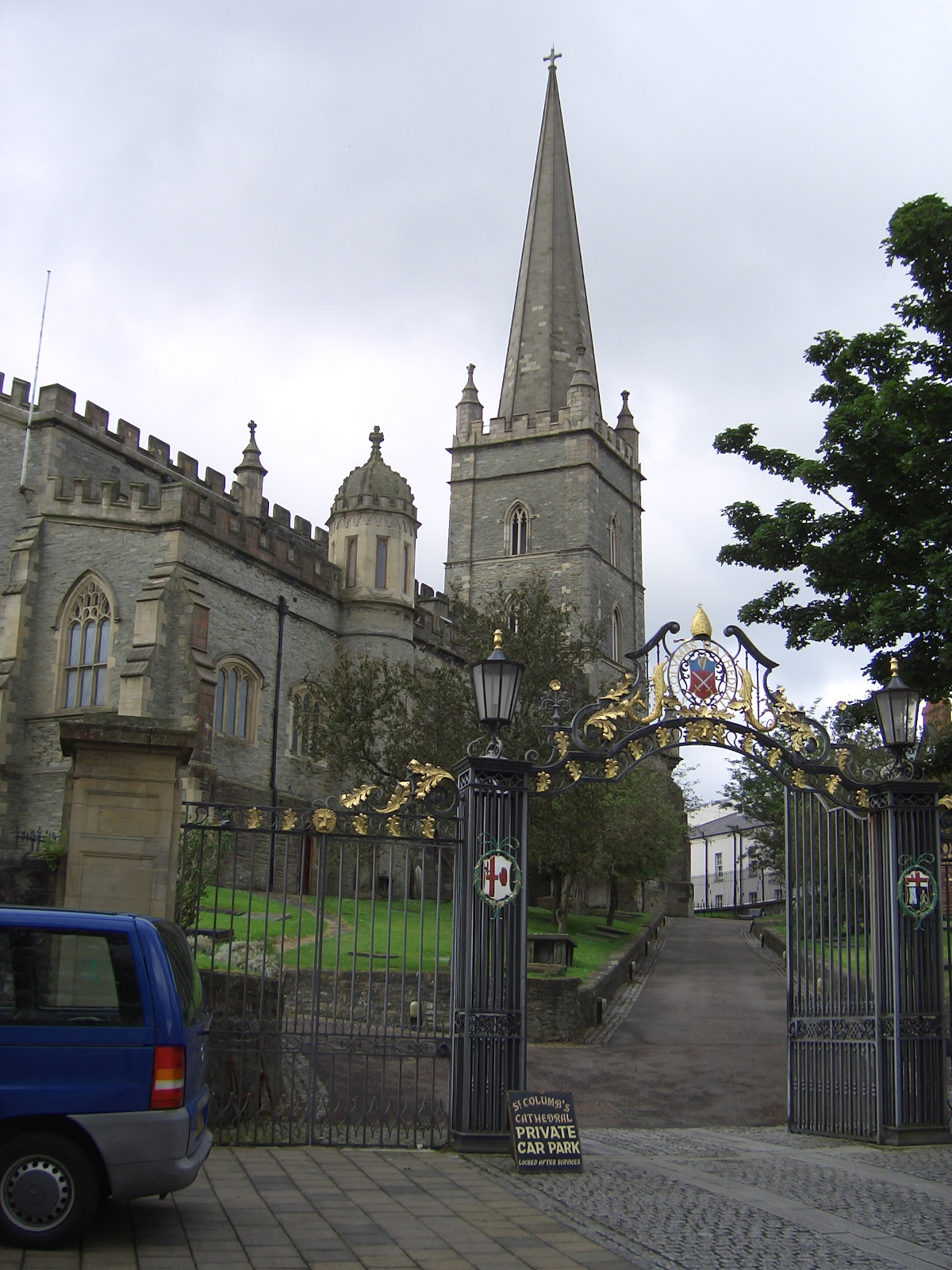
St Columb's Cathedral, Derry

- 1611/2 William Webbe
- 1621–1635 Henry Sutton (afterwards Dean of Limerick, 1635)
- 1635–1637 Michael Wandesford
- 1637/8–1639 James Margetson (afterwards Dean of Christ Church Cathedral, Dublin, 1639)
- 1639/40 Geoffrey Rhodes
- 1661 George Beaumont
- 1663 George Holland
- 1670–1671 William Lightburne
- 1671/2 John Lesley
- 1672 Peter Manby (converted to Roman Catholic but remained dean)
- 1690–1690 Peter Morris
- 1690/1–1695 Thomas Wallis
- 1695–1699/1700 Coote Ormsby
- 1699/1700–1724 John Bolton
- 1724–1733 George Berkeley (philosopher) (afterwards Bishop of Cloyne, 1734)
- 1733/4–1740 George Stone (afterwards Bishop of Ferns and Leighlin, 1740)
- 1740–1744 Robert Downes (afterwards Bishop of Ferns and Leighlin, 1744)
- 1744–1752 Arthur Smyth (afterwards Bishop of Clonfert and Kilmacduagh, 1752)
- 1752–1769 Rt Hon Philip Sydney Smyth (4th Viscount Strangford, afterwards archdeacon)
- 1769–1780 Thomas Barnard (afterwards Bishop of Killaloe and Kilfenora, 1780)
- 1780–1781 William Cecil Pery (afterwards Bishop of Killala and Achonry
- 1781–1783 Edward Emily
- 1783–1808 John Hume
- 1818–1819 James Saurin (afterwards Bishop of Dromore, 1819)
- 1820–1860 Thomas Bunbury Gough, constructed the Deanery on Bishop Street
- 1860–1874 Hugh Usher Tighe
- 1874–1882 Charles Seymour
- 1882–1883 John Gwynne
- 1883–1897 Andrew Ferguson Smyly
- 1897–1901 Thomas Olphert
- 1901–1911 George Galbraith
- 1911–1921 Richard Hayes
- 1921–1946 Richard George Salmon King
- 1946-1967 Leslie Robert Lawrenson
- 1967–1984 George Good
- 1984–1997 David Cecil Orr
- 1997–2016. William W Morton
- 2017- Raymond J Stewart
