= Cecil Orr =

Irish dean (1933–2022)

David Cecil Orr (11 September 1933 – 11 November 2022) was Dean of Derry from 1984 until his retirement in 1997.

Born on 11 September 1933, Orr was educated at Trinity College, Dublin where he met his Dublin born wife Valerie and ordained in 1958. After a curacy at Drumragh he held incumbencies at Convoy, Maghera and Mountfield before his appointment to the deanery.

He was Succeeded by the Rev’d Dr William W Morton as Dean of St Columb's and Rector of the Parish of Templemore.

Church of Ireland titles
Preceded by George Fitzgerald Good	Dean of Derry; 1984–1997	Succeeded by William Wright Morton
