= Richard Hayes (priest) =

Richard Hayes was Dean of Derry from 1911 until 1921.

== Early life and education ==
He was educated at Trinity College, Dublin and ordained in 1882.

== Career ==
Hayes began his ecclesiastical career as a curate at Derry Cathedral. He was Rector of Drumragh from 1893 to 1904; and of Templemore from 1904 until his elevation to the deanery.

== Death ==
He died on 12 November 1938.

Church of Ireland titles
Preceded by George Galbraith	Dean of Derry; 1911–1921	Succeeded by Richard George Salmon King
