= Robert Charles Francis =

Robert Charles Francis may refer to:

- Robert Francis (actor) (1930–1955), American actor
- Bob Francis (referee) (born 1942), New Zealand politician and former rugby union referee

== See also ==
- Charles Robert Francis, U.S. Marine who received the Medal of Honor
