= Leslie Lawrenson =

Leslie Robert Lawrenson (July 25, 1902 - 1978) was Dean of Derry from 1946 until 1967.

== Life ==
Born in 1902, he was educated at Trinity College, Dublin and ordained in 1926. Hayes was a curate at Derry Cathedral, the rector of Donegal from 1930 to 1938 and then of Conwal and Leck until his appointment to the deanery.

Church of Ireland titles
| Preceded by Richard King | Dean of Derry; 1946–1967 | Succeeded by George Fitzgerald Good |
