= Lawrenson =

Lawrenson is an English patronymic surname. Notable people with the surname include:

- Johnny Lawrenson (1921–2010), English rugby league player
- Leslie Lawrenson (1902–1978), Irish Anglican bishop
- Mark Lawrenson (born 1957), English footballer, manager and television presenter
- Mary Lawrenson (1850–1943), English co-operator
- Peter Lawrenson (1933–2017), British electrical engineer
- Robert Lawrenson (born 1971), English actor
