= Richard King (priest) =

Richard George Salmon King (1871–23 October 1958) was the Dean of Derry from 1921 to 1946.

King was educated at Trinity College, Dublin and ordained in 1895. He was a curate at Mullingar and then Holloway before becoming the rector of Drumachose in 1904, a post he held until his appointment to the deanery.

King was an ardent Unionist.

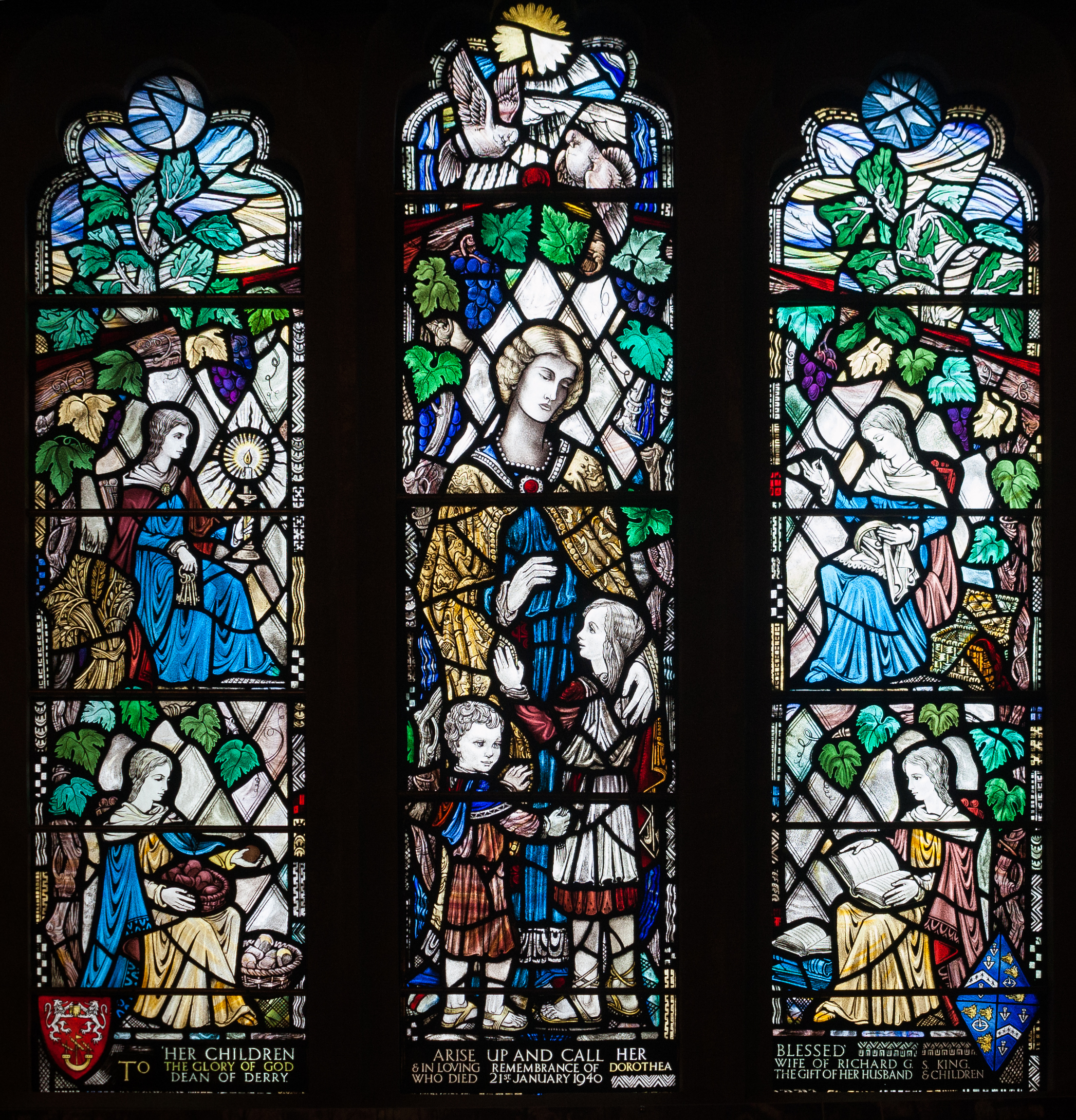
Stained glass window in memory of Dorothea King

King was married with Dorothea King, youngest daughter of Andrew Ferguson Smyly, formerly dean of Derry, and niece of William Alexander. When King refused the offer to become Archbishop of Armagh in 1938, the illness of his wife was one of the reasons. In 1947, a stained glass window was installed in her memory in the baptistery of St Columb's Cathedral.

Church of Ireland titles
Preceded by Richard Hayes	Dean of Derry; 1921–1946	Succeeded by Leslie Robert Lawrenson
