= Sidney Campbell =

English organist

Sidney Scholfield Campbell MVO (born 1909 in London and died on 4 June 1974 in Windsor) was an English organist, composer and music editor. The final 13 years of his career were spent as the organist and Director of Music at St George’s Chapel, Windsor Castle. Campbell previously worked as an organist at parish churches, collegiate chapels and cathedrals, including Canterbury, Ely and Southwark.

Campbell studied organ under Ernest Bullock and Harold Darke. In 1931 he was awarded the FRCO. He was a close friend of Gordon Phillips, instigator and editor of the Hinrichsen Early English Organ Music series Tallis to Wesley. While at Windsor he oversaw the reconstruction of the 18th century Harrison & Harrison organ there, completed in 1965. His extensive collection of organ music remains at Windsor Castle.

His compositions include organ music, choral anthems and fanfares. While at Canterbury he composed a Te Deum for the enthronement of the Archbishop of Canterbury in 1961. At Windsor he composed the anthems Sing we merrily unto God our strength (1962, for the St Albans Festival) and Jubilate Deo, for the opening of St George's Conference House (1966). He published the book Music in the Church in 1951.

== Career ==
He was

- organist of St. Margaret's Church, Leytonstone 1927 to 1929
- organist of Chigwell Parish Church 1929 to 1931
- organist of West Ham Parish Church 1931 to 1937
- organist of St. Matthew's, West Ham 1931 to 1936
- organist of St. Peter's Church, Croydon 1937 - 1943
- organist of St. Peter's Church, Wolverhampton 1943 to 1947
- organist of Ely Cathedral 1949 to 1953
- organist of Southwark Cathedral 1953 to 1956
- organist of Canterbury Cathedral 1956 to 1961
- organist of St George's Chapel at Windsor Castle 1961 - 1974.

Sidney Campbell was also organist of St Clements Church in Sandwich, Kent.

Cultural offices
Unknown	Organist and Master of the Choristers at St. Peter's Collegiate Church, Wolverhampton; 1943-1947	Succeeded by Charles Hutchings
Preceded by Marmaduke Conway	Organist and Master of the Choristers at Ely Cathedral; 1949-1953	Succeeded by Michael Howard
Preceded by Edgar Cook	Organist and Master of the Choristers at Southwark Cathedral; 1953-1956	Succeeded by Harold Dexter
Preceded by Douglas Edward Hopkins	Organist and Master of the Choristers at Canterbury Cathedral; 1956-1961	Succeeded by Allan Wicks
Preceded by William Henry Harris	Director of Music, St George's Chapel, Windsor Castle; 1961-1974	Succeeded by Christopher Robinson
