= Michael Wandesford =

Anglican priest

Michael Wandesford was an Anglican priest in the early seventeenth century.

He was the son of George Wandesford and Catharine Hanby, and the brother of Christopher Wandesford, who was to be Lord Deputy of Ireland in 1640,

Michael Wandsford was appointed Dean of Limerick in May 1635; and Dean of Derry in November 1635.

He died in 1637.

Church of Ireland titles
Preceded by George Andrews	Dean of Limerick; May 1635 – November 1635	Succeeded by Henry Sutton
Preceded by Henry Sutton	Dean of Derry; 1635 – 1637	Succeeded by James Margetson
