= Stanley Vann =

English composer and organist (1910–2010)

Stanley Vann Hon FTCL FRCO ARCM
- Born: William Stanley Vann; 15 February 1910; Leicester, England
- Died: 27 March 2010 (aged 100) England
- Genres: Classical, Anglican church music
- Occupations: Composer, Organist, Choral conductor, Choir trainer, Professor
- Instruments: Organ, Piano
- Years active: 1931–2010

William Stanley Vann Hon FTCL FRCO ARCM (15 February 1910 – 27 March 2010) was an English composer, organist, choral conductor, and choir trainer, primarily in the Anglican cathedral tradition.

== Early life ==
Born in Leicester, he started to learn the piano around the age of six. He turned to the organ in 1927, achieving his ARCM, ARCO and FRCO diplomas by 1930.

== The start of a musical career ==
1931 saw his appointment as Assistant Organist at Leicester Cathedral, whilst still a pupil under the organist George Charles Gray. This was followed by his becoming the Organist at Gainsborough Parish Church in 1933, and then a move to Holy Trinity Church, Leamington Spa to be Organist in 1939. Whilst in Leamington he founded the Royal Leamington Spa Bach Choir and (in 1940) the Warwickshire Symphony Orchestra.

His time at Leamington was interrupted between 1942 and 1946 by service in the Royal Artillery during the Second World War. After his initial service, he was commissioned as a second lieutenant on 17 December 1943, later rising to the rank of captain.

In 1949 he was appointed as Organist of Chelmsford Cathedral and Professor of Harmony and Counterpoint at Trinity College, London. Once in Chelmsford, he started the Essex Symphony Orchestra.

He also acted as Chorus Master for the Leicester Philharmonic for both Sir Henry Wood and Sir Malcolm Sargent.

== Peterborough ==
Sargent had himself been a pupil/assistant organist or 'Articled Pupil' at Peterborough Cathedral in 1909 and it was to Peterborough that Vann moved next, being appointed Master of the Music in 1953. He held this post until his retirement in 1977. Much of his discography comes from this period, and bears witness to the extremely high standard to which he raised the choir. In 1971 he was awarded a Lambeth doctorate by the then Archbishop of Canterbury in recognition of his "eminent services to church music".

Following his retirement, he moved the short distance to Wansford where he ran the parish choir at St Mary's church and continued giving singing lessons to several local singers. He also continued the composition which had always run in parallel with the various posts he held. He composed over 200 items of vocal or choral music, the majority of which could be classified as Anglican church music. There is also a large body of organ music. Larger scale works are chiefly represented by the Billingshurst Mass, for large chorus and orchestra, a concert setting of the mass that also interpolates the Ave Maria into the usual text. Premiered in Chichester Cathedral in 2000, following a commission from the Billingshurst Choral Society (a committee member being a former Peterborough chorister), it was later performed in Peterborough Cathedral. 2000 also marked his 90th birthday, which saw a celebratory concert by the Peterborough Chamber Choir at All Saints' Church, Peterborough, which received favourable reviews in the Church Times.

2002 saw him finally leave the Peterborough area, moving to Richmond, North Yorkshire to be closer to family members.

== Later life ==
In 2005 a collection of his major organ works was published, and a scholarship and trust in his name was founded by Major and Mrs Vernon Yon, an American who heard the Peterborough Cathedral Choir whilst posted to the UK. The object of the Trust is to enhance Anglican choral music by the grant of an annual Scholarship (The Stanley Vann Scholarship) for young choir trainers and directors in the Anglican tradition.

24 September 2006 edition of the Sunday BBC Radio 3 programme The Choir celebrated the forthcoming 80th anniversary of the weekly broadcast of Choral Evensong on BBC Radio. Amongst the items selected from across the 80-year period was a recording of Peterborough Cathedral Choir, under Vann, from 23 November 1962, singing the plainsong hymn O blest creator. This was followed by a series of broadcasts of complete archive editions of Choral Evensong. Peterborough Cathedral Choir was featured on Wednesday 13 December 2006 by the broadcast of a service originally heard on 11 October 1972.

On Monday 15 February 2010 Vann celebrated his 100th birthday. The previous day his family and a few former choristers joined him for lunch. To mark his 100th birthday, Peterborough Cathedral issued a commemorative CD, Harken to the Whispering Angels, with a compilation of recordings by both the current choir and earlier recordings made during his tenure as organist. Excerpts from the CD, and from Vann's recording of Sir John Stainer's The Crucifixion, were broadcast during BBC Radio 3's The Choir on 21 February, along with an interview with his former assistant, Barry Ferguson. On 24 February the cathedral choir again broadcast Choral Evensong live on BBC Radio 3 with music composed by Vann and an anthem composed by Herbert Howells, commissioned by Vann during his time at Peterborough.

Vann suffered a fall at home on 20 March 2010 and broke a hip. Attempts were made to operate, but he suffered a bad reaction to the anaesthetic, and subsequently developed pneumonia. He died one week later, 40 days after his 100th birthday. His funeral was at Peterborough Cathedral on 19 April 2010, and a memorial service was held there on 18 July 2010, and at its conclusion Vann's ashes were interred in the south aisle of the cathedral.

Cultural offices
| Preceded by Roland Middleton | Director of Music of Chelmsford Cathedral; 1949–1953 | Succeeded by Derrick Cantrell |
| Preceded by Douglas Edward Hopkins | Organist and Master of the Choristers of Peterborough Cathedral; 1953–1977 | Succeeded by Christopher Gower |
