= Henry Sutton (priest) =

Irish Anglican priest

Henry Sutton was an Anglican priest in the first half of the seventeenth century.

He was Chaplain to Oliver St John, 1st Viscount Grandison, Lord Deputy of Ireland and Rector of Ardrahan. He was appointed Dean of Waterford on 17 November 1620; Dean of Derry on 3 May 1621 and Dean of Limerick on 9 November 1635, serving until 1640.

Church of Ireland titles
Preceded by Richard Boyle	Dean of Waterford; 1620–1621	Succeeded by Anthony Martin
Preceded by William Webbe	Dean of Derry; 1621 – November 1635	Succeeded by Michael Wandesford
Preceded by Michael Wandesford	Dean of Limerick; 1635–1640	Succeeded by Robert Naylor
