= George Galbraith (priest) =

George Galbraith was Dean of Derry from 1901 until his death in 1911.

Born in 1829, he was educated at Portora Royal School and Trinity College, Dublin. He was ordained in 1852 and began his ecclesiastical career with a curacy at Kilglass. He was Rector of Lower Cumber from 1867 until his elevation to the Deanery.

He died on 3 October 1911.

Church of Ireland titles
Preceded by Thomas Olphert	Dean of Derry; 1901–1911	Succeeded by Richard Hayes
