= Richard Henry Coleman =

Cathedral organist at Peterborough Cathedral

Richard 'Henry' Pinwill Coleman (3 April 1888, Dartmouth – 17 February 1965, Dartmouth) - also known simply as Henry Coleman - was an English composer, author, and organist.

== Career ==
He spent time as a chorister in St George's Church, Ramsgate, Kent, and was later a pupil at Denstone College, Staffordshire.

Coleman was then an articled pupil of Sydney Nicholson at Carlisle Cathedral and Manchester Cathedral where in 1908 he was appointed the Assistant Organist.. While at Carlisle he was also the organist of St Stehen's church.

He also trained with R.J. Forbes, Francis Harford and Paul le Vallon. In 1911 he gained the Fellowship diploma of Royal College of Organists (FRCO). He was then appointed to the post of cathedra organist at Blackburn Cathedral 1912–14.

From 1914 to 1920 he was the organist at St Columb's Cathedral, Derry. It was as a result of his time in Ireland that he acquired the degrees of B.Mus. (1919) and D.Mus. (1924) from the University of Dublin.. On returning to England in 1920 he became director of music of the Chailey Heritage School, near Lewes, Sussex.

From 1921–1944 he was organist at Peterborough Cathedral. From 1944–46 he had the role of music advisor for the county of Staffordshire.

From 1947–48 Coleman was organist of Hatfield Parish Church, Hertfordshire, From 1949–58 he was director of music of All Saints' Church, Eastbourne, Sussex, and from 1959 organist of the Chapel Royal, Brighton.

== BBC Broadcasts ==
- 1932
  - Sunday 26 June, 20h on National Programme Daventry. ' A religious service'. From Peterborough Cathedral.
- 1933
  - Tuesday 28 March 18h30 on Regional Programme Midland. 'An organ recital by Dr Henry Coleman'. Relayed from Peterborough Cathedral.
  - Sunday 30 July, 20h on Regional Programme Midland. 'A religious service'. This is the first Midland Regional broadcast of a service from Peterborough Cathedral. Dr. J. G. Simpson was appointed Dean of Peterborough in 1928. He had previously been a Canon of St. Paul's and Principal of the Leeds Clergy School. This year being the tercentenary of the death of George Herbert , the religious poet and divine (1593-1633), the two hymns at this Service are from his poems. Relayed from Peterborough Cathedral.
  - Sunday 12 November 16h30 on Regional Programme Midland. 'A Programme of Unaccompanied Motets' . Relayed from Peterborough Cathedral.
  - Sunday 10 December, 16h30 on Regional Programme Midland. 'A Motet Recital'. (Eight-part double choir). Relayed from Peterborough Cathedral.
  - Saturday 23 December 20h40 on Regional Programme Midland. 'Carols'. Relayed from Peterborough Cathedral.
- 1934
  - Sunday 23 September 1934, 22h on Regional Programme Midland. 'Old English Organ Music: A Recital by Dr Henry Coleman'. This recital will be preceded by a short description of the Cathedral Song School in the Chapel of St. Thomas à Becket, and of the practice organ. The composers were all bom in the eighteenth century. Stanley was Boyce's successor as Master of the King's Band of Musick. Relayed from The Song School, Peterborough Cathedral.
  - Saturday 10 November 1934, 19h45 on Regional Programme Midland. 'Armistice Eve'. Peterborough Orchestral Society [...] Dr. Henry Coleman, Organist of the Cathedral, [...] succeeded Mr. Armstrong as the Society's Conductor. Relayed from Peterborough Cathedral.
- 1935
  - Wednesday 8 May, 19h30 on Regional Programme Midland. 'Masters of the King's Musick'. Relayed from Peterborough Cathedral.
  - Sunday 14 July, 21h30 on Regional Programme Midland. 'A Recital'. The Choir of Peterborough Cathedral, which listeners last heard in the Masters of the King's Musick from Midland in Jubilee week, has regularly broadcast during the last two years, chiefly in unaccompanied singing. Only three of the nine numbers in the present recital will be unaccompanied, however ; one of these, ' Grant us Grace, Lord ', is by Dr. Alfred Whitehead , organist of Montreal Cathedral, and is dedicated to Dr. Coleman and the Peterborough Choir. Bach's lovely aria and chorale will be sung by the boys alone. Dr. Coleman has been organist at Peterborough Cathedral since 1921. Relayed from Peterborough Cathedral.
  - Saturday 21 December 20h30 on Regional Programme Midland. 'Christmas Music': Again, as a year ago, the programme of Christmas music from Peterborough Cathedral has been chosen by Dr. Henry Coleman, the cathedral organist. It includes representative old English, old German, and old Basque carols. Relayed from Peterborough Cathedral.
- 1936
  - Friday 1 May,19h30 on Regional Programme Midland. 'The Musician at the Gramophone: Henry Coleman'. Dr. Coleman has been organist and Master of Choristers at Peterborough Cathedral since 1921; has conducted a number of choral societies in the Fast Midlands, composed Church music, and written two books on choir training. He has broadcast on several occasions. His recital will provide examples of English Church music, and records will be heard of the choirs of some of our best-known Cathedrals, College chapels, and churches, such as Westminster Abbey, King's College, Cambridge, St. George's Chapel, Windsor, and the Temple Church, London.
- 1938
  - Wednesday 14 December, 19h30 on Regional Programme Midland. 'The Musician at the Gramophone: Henry Coleman'. Dr. Henry Coleman has been organist and Master of the Choristers at Peterborough Cathedral since 1921. He is conductor of several choral societies and was in charge of a performance of Bach's St. Matthew Passion in which representatives of thirty choirs and eight choral societies took part.

== Publications ==
=== Books ===
- 1932/1936 : The Amateur Choir trainer (repr, 1964 as "The Church Choir-trainer").
- Choral Conducting for Women's Institutes.
- 1950 : Youth Club Choirs.
- 1955 : The Amateur Organist.(repr.1968 as "The Church Organist").
- 1962 : Girls' Choirs (with Hilda West).

=== Instrumental ===
- 1921 : A Donegal Air arranged for violin and piano.
- 1929 : 'Drink to me only'. Old English Air, arr for Violin, Violoncello & Piano.
- 1956 : Suite for Oboe and Pianoforte. Arranged from various John Stanley voluntaries for organ or harpsichord.

=== Organ ===
- 1918 : Londonderry Air : Farewell to Cucullain : In Purple Album of Twenty Pieces for the Organ (R. Goss-Custard, ed).
- 1933 : Ten Hymn Tune Voluntaries.
- 1939/1945 : Suite for organ / from the Voluntaries by John Stanley, transcribed and arranged by Henry Coleman.
- 1947 : Rhapsody on "King's Lynn".
- 1949 : A Book of Simple Organ Voluntaries.
- 1950 : Alla Marcia in A Book of Hymn Tune Voluntaries.
- 1956 : Festal Finale.
- 1956: Ten Voluntaries (Set 2) : for organ, without pedals, harmonium, or American organ.
- 1956 : Prelude.
- 1958 : 'Variations on a Bass'. 'Toccata in the French style' in Two Pieces for Organ.
- 1959 : Festival March.
- 1961 : Twenty-four Interludes : based on communion hymn tunes (for manuals only, with optional pedal).
- 1953 : Varied Hymn Accompaniments.
- 1955 : Voluntary in G.

=== Piano ===
- 1924 : Dance-Suite.
- 1924 : School-time sketches.
- 1925 : Holiday Sketches.
- 1928 : Play-time Pieces : for piano or for two pianos.
- 1929 : Gavotte.
- 1929 : Waltz.
- 1930 : Summer Scenes : ten jolly tunes.
- 1947 : Muzio Clementi's Sonata in B flat, for Two Pianos (arr.).
- 1953 : Country Pictures : six pieces for pianoforte.
- 1953 : The Months : six pieces for pianoforte.
- 1956 : The Piano Class. BK.1.

=== Voices ===
- 1920 : Evening Service in D.
- 1925 : Drink to me only. Arr. for male voices.
- 1927 : An Old English Song Cycle, arr. for low voice and piano.
- 1930 : Magnificat and Nunc Dimittis.
- 1930 : Rock of Ages. Hymn anthem. Baritone solo and chorus.
- 1930 : Service of the Holy cothmnnion... in C.
- 1930 : Tunes from the Great Composers ... Material for music appreciation and singing.
- 1930 : When I Survey. Hymn anthem, baritone solo and chorus.
- 1931 : Bread of the World. Introit on a 17th century German tune.
- 1931 : My God, How wonderful Thou art. Hymn-anthem. S.A.T.B.
- 1931 : O God, Unseen Yet Ever Near. For use as an Introit ... on the tune "Irish".
- 1931 : O Food That Weary Pilgrims Love. introit on a tune by Schicht, words from the Latin.
- 1931 : Short Anthems for the Holy Communion, etc.
- 1931 : To Thee, O Lord, Our Hearts We Raise.
- 1932 : All Ye Who Seek for Sure Relief. Anthem, on the tune "St. Bernard".
- 1932 : As Pants the Hart. Anthem on the tune "Martyrdom".
- 1932 : Great God, what do I see... anthem on the tune "Luther".
- 1932 : My God, How Wonderful Thou art.
- 1932 : 'O Worship the King' : anthem, on the tune "Hanover".
- 1935 : I Vow to Yhee, my Country. Hymn, words by Sir Cecil Spring-Rice.
- 1951 : My Bonnie. For youth club choirs.
- 1952 : Loudly Proclaim. Departure of the King.' Traditional Welsh song, with descant].
- 1952 : O Little Pne Sleep. Cradle song on a 17th century German melody.
- 1956 : Communion Service in C.
- 1959 : Gathering Daffodils. Two-part song.
- 1959 : The Keys of Heaven : for duet and chorus (unaccompanied or with piano ad lib.).
- 1959 : Our Father, by whose Servants. (S.A.T.B.).
- 1959 : Praise to the Lord : hymn-anthem on "Lobe den Herrn".
- 1959 : The Oxford Chant Book : for three-part singing.
- 1960 : Five Minutes Weekly : a sight-singing course.
- 1961 : Benedicite, omnia opera : S.A.T.B. / set to well-known chants.
- 1962 : The Cow. Unison song, with optional 2nd treble and optional descant.
- 1964 : Our Homeland. (Unison song).
- 1965 : 26 Hymn tunes, arr. for SSA.
- 1966 : The King of Love. Hymn-anthem on "St. Columba.

Cultural offices
Preceded by Christie Green	Organist and Master of the Choristers of Blackburn Cathedral; 1912–1914	Succeeded by Charles Hylton Stewart
Preceded by Sydney Weale	Organist and Master of the Choristers of St Columb's Cathedral; 1914–1920	Succeeded by John T Frankland
Preceded by Haydn Keeton	Organist and Master of the Choristers of Peterborough Cathedral; 1921–1944	Succeeded by Charles Cooper Francis
