= Charles Cooper Francis =

English cathedral organist

Charles Cooper Francis (1884–1956) was a cathedral organist, who served at Peterborough Cathedral.

== Background ==
Charles Cooper Francis was born on 20 December 1884 in Peterborough.

He was an articled pupil of Haydn Keeton at Peterborough Cathedral.

== Career ==
Assistant Organist of:

- Peterborough Cathedral 1905–1910

Organist of:

- St. Mark's Church, Harrogate 1910–1914
- St. Mary's Church, Peterborough 1914–1920
- Peterborough Cathedral 1944–1946

Cultural offices
Preceded by Richard Henry Coleman	Organist and Master of the Choristers of Peterborough Cathedral; 1944-1946	Succeeded by Douglas Edward Hopkins
