= Douglas Edward Hopkins =

English organist (1902–1992)

Douglas Edward Hopkins FRAM FRCO
- Born: 23 December 1902; London, England
- Died: 1992 (aged 89–90)
- Education: Royal Academy of Music; Guildhall School of Music
- Occupation: Cathedral organist
- Years active: 1920s–1970s
- Employer: Royal Academy of Music

Douglas Edward Hopkins FRAM FRCO (23 December 1902 – 1992) was a cathedral organist, who served at Peterborough Cathedral and Canterbury Cathedral.

== Background ==
Hopkins was born on 23 December 1902 in London.

He studied at the Royal Academy of Music and the Guildhall School of Music and earned a Doctor of Music. He was a professor at the Royal Academy of Music, where he taught organ and choir training.

== Career ==
Sub-organist:

- St Paul's Cathedral (1927–1946)

Organist:

- Peterborough Cathedral (1946–1953)
- Canterbury Cathedral (1953–1955)
- St Marylebone Parish Church (1965–1971)
- Royal Memorial Chapel, Sandhurst (1971–1976)

Cultural offices
Preceded by Charles Cooper Francis	Organist and Master of the Choristers of Peterborough Cathedral; 1946-1953	Succeeded by Stanley Vann
Preceded by Gerald Hocken Knight	Organist and Master of the Choristers of Canterbury Cathedral; 1953-1955	Succeeded by Sidney Campbell
