= Sydney Weale =

English cathedral organist

Sydney Harry Franz Weale (1881–1943) was a cathedral organist, who served in St Columb's Cathedral, Derry and was borough organist for Stoke on Trent.

== Background ==
He was educated at Ludlow in Shrosphire.

== Career ==
Assistant organist of:

- St David's Cathedral 1899 - 1901
- Church of St. Mary Magdalene, Newark-on-Trent 1901 - 1903
- Southwell Minster 1903 - 1904
- St. John's Episcopal Church Perth 1904 - 1909

Organist of:

- M.N.C. Church, Mapplewell 1894 - 1895
- Westgate Church, Barnsley 1895 - 1898
- Conisbrough Parish Church 1898 - 1899
- Barony Parish Church, Glasgow 1909 - 1911
- St Columb's Cathedral, Derry 1911 - 1913
- Bridlington Priory 1914 - 1920
- Borough of Stoke on Trent 1920 - 1943

Cultural offices
Preceded by Daniel Jones	Organist and Master of the Choristers of St Columb's Cathedral; 1911-1913	Succeeded by Richard Henry Coleman
