= E. T. Cook =

British musician

- Born: Edgar Thomas Cook; 18 March 1880; Worcester, England, United Kingdom
- Died: 5 March 1953 (aged 72) England, United Kingdom
- Genres: Classical
- Occupations: Composer, organist
- Instrument: Organ

Edgar Thomas Cook CBE D.Mus. (Cantuar) FRCO FRCM (18 March 1880 – 5 March 1953) was an English organist and composer.

== Biography ==
Edgar Cook was born in Worcester, England. He was sent to the Royal Grammar School Worcester and began his career as a church organist in 1898. In 1904 he became assistant organist of Worcester Cathedral under Sir Ivor Atkins. He won an Organ Scholarship to The Queen's College, Oxford where he studied music and obtained his MMus. In 1909 he became organist of Southwark Cathedral in which position he remained until his death in 1953. He was the cathedral's first organist.

He was one of the first organists to broadcast on radio and he became famous for his lunchtime concerts broadcast on the BBC in the 1930s and 1940s. He was awarded the prestigious Lambeth degree of DMus (Cantuar) by the Archbishop of Canterbury in 1936 and was created Commander of the Order of the British Empire (CBE) in 1949. He composed choral and organ works including an Evening Service in G. Amongst other honours he was a Fellow of the Royal College of Organists, becoming vice-president, and Professor of Music and Fellow of the Royal College of Music.

He died in 1953 shortly before the coronation of Queen Elizabeth II for which he was preparing his choristers.

Cultural offices
Preceded by Alfred Richardson	Organist and Master of the Choristers of Southwark Cathedral; 1908–1953	Succeeded by Sidney Campbell
