= Victor Stacey =

Irish priest (1944–2020)

Victor George Stacey (19 March 1944 – 30 December 2020) was Dean of St. Patrick's Cathedral, Dublin from 2012 until 2016.

Stracey was educated at Kilkenny College, the National University of Ireland, Trinity College, Dublin and Queen's University Belfast; and ordained in 1973. He held curacies at Derriaghy then Knock. He was the incumbent at Ballymacarrett from 1979 to 1986; Santry, 1986 to 1994; and Dún Laoghaire from 1995 until his appointment as Dean.

== Notes ==
Church of Ireland titles
Preceded by Robert MacCarthy	Dean of St. Patrick's Cathedral, Dublin; 2012–	Succeeded by William Morton
