= George Andrews (bishop) =

Irish Anglican priest

George Andrews, MA (1576–1648) was an Anglican priest in the early seventeenth century.

Born in England, he was educated at Magdalen College, Oxford, and was appointed Dean of Limerick and Precentor of St Patrick's Cathedral, Dublin in 1603.

His promotion in 1635 to Bishop of Ferns and Leighlin was reputed a dubious honor, considering the low income of that see. The Lord Deputy of Ireland (the Earl of Strafford) is said to have written to Archbishop Laud: "If your Lordship thinks Dean Andrew hath been to blame, and that you would chastise him for it, make him Bishop of Ferns and Leighlin, to have it without any other commendams; and then, I assure you, he shall leave better behind him than will be recompensed out of that bishopric, which is one of the meanest of the whole kingdom."

He died in October 1648 and is buried at St Clement Danes in the City of Westminster, London.

Church of Ireland titles
Preceded by Denis Campbell	Dean of Limerick; 1603–1635	Succeeded by Michael Wandesford
Preceded by Thomas Ram	Bishop of Ferns and Leighlin; 1635–1648	Succeeded by See vacant
