= Gerald H. Knight =

British musician

Gerald Hocken Knight CBE FRSCM (1908–1979) was a cathedral organist, who served at Canterbury Cathedral.

== Background ==
Gerald Hocken Knight was born on 27 July 1908 in Par, Cornwall, the only son of Alwyne Knight of Par by his first wife Edith Harvey and descended from yeomen, the Knights of Luxulyan. Gerald was educated at Truro Cathedral School and Peterhouse, Cambridge. He was an articled organ pupil of Hubert Stanley Middleton at Truro Cathedral.

Director of the Royal School of Church Music 1954-1973.

He was appointed a Fellow of the Royal School of Church Music in 1964.

== Publications ==
Together with John Dykes Bower, he co-edited the "revised edition" of Hymns Ancient and Modern, which was published in 1950. In addition, he published the following compositions and books:

- The Treasury of English Church Music. Volume one. 1100-1545. Edited by Denis Stevens, etc. 1965
- Accompaniments for unison Hymn-singing. 1971
- Christ whose Glory fills the Skies. [Anthem for treble voices and organ.] Words by Charles Wesley, etc. 1957
- The Coventry Mass. Adapted from medieval sources. Accompaniment by G. H. Knight. 1966
- Incidental Vocal Music to "The Devil to pay," Play by Dorothy L. Sayers. 1939
- Incidental Music to The Zeal of Thy House, Dorothy L. Sayers. 1938
- Twenty Questions on Church Music. Answered by G. H. Knight (Series. no. 3.), 1950
- R.S.C.M. The first forty years. 1968

== Career ==
Organist of:

- St Augustine of Canterbury, Queen's Gate London 1931 - 1937
- Canterbury Cathedral 1937 - 1953

Church of England titles
Preceded by Clement Charlton Palmer	Organist and Master of the Choristers of Canterbury Cathedral; 1937–1953	Succeeded by Douglas Edward Hopkins
Cultural offices
Preceded by Sydney Nicholson	Director of the Royal School of Church Music; 1954–1972	Succeeded by Lionel Dakers
