= William Morton (priest) =

Irish Anglican cleric

William Wright Morton DL has been Dean of St Patrick's Cathedral, Dublin since 2016.

Born in 1956, he was educated at Trinity College, Dublin, and ordained in 1989. After a curacy at Drumachose, he was the incumbent at Conwal before being appointed Dean of Derry in 1997. He remained there for almost 20 years until his appointment to Saint Patrick's Cathedral, Dublin. On Monday 9 May 2016, the chapter of St Patrick's cathedral, Dublin elected him as the new dean of St Patrick's. In June 2018, Ulster University announced it would award him with an honorary degree in recognition of his civic contributions.

Church of Ireland titles
Preceded by Victor Stacey	Dean of St Patrick's Cathedral Dublin; 2016–	Incumbent
