= Haydn Keeton =

British cathedral organist (1847–1921)

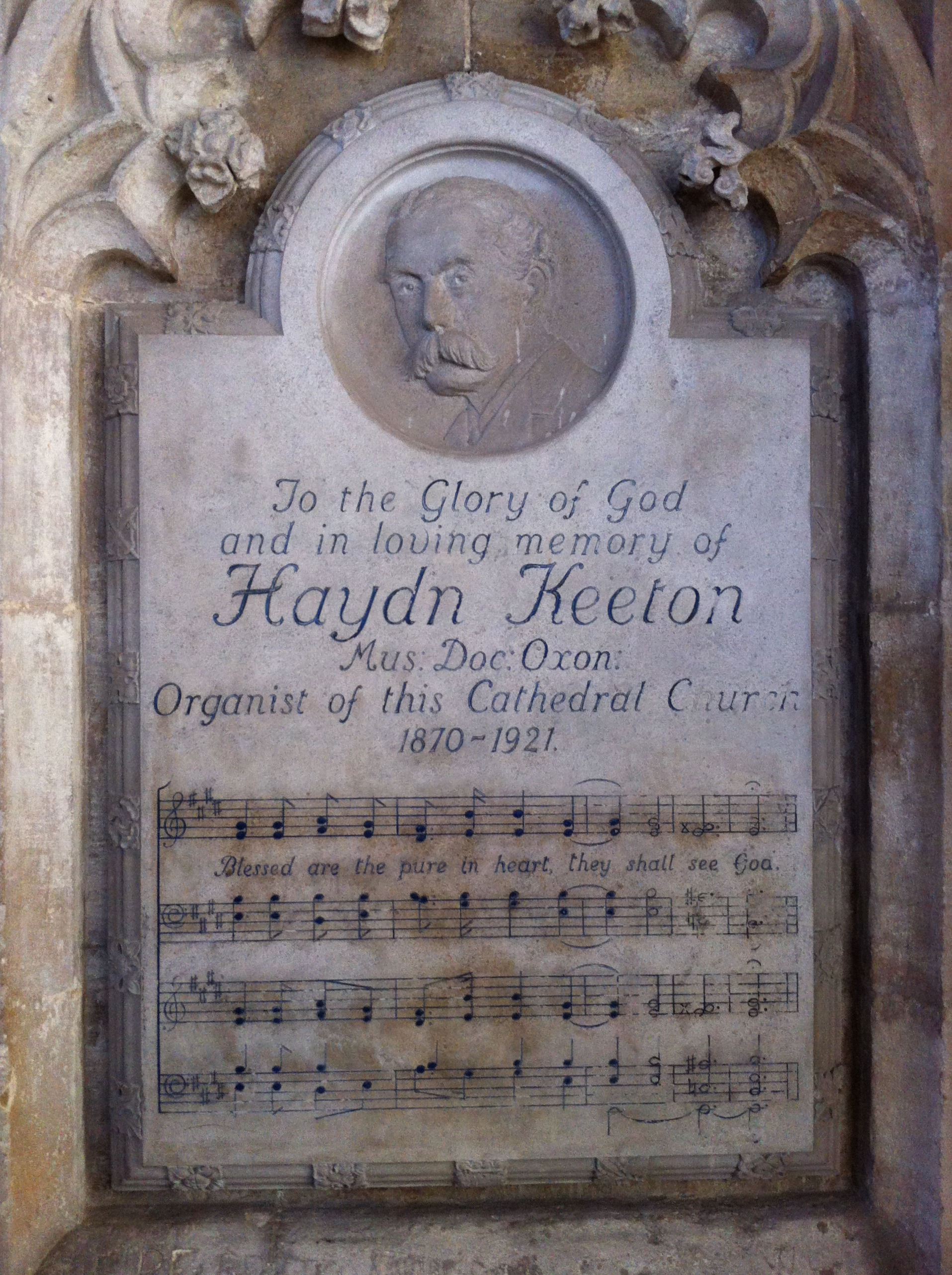
Memorial in Peterborough Cathedral

Haydn Keeton (26 October 1847, in Mosborough – 27 May 1921, in Peterborough) was a cathedral organist, who served at Peterborough Cathedral.

== Background ==
Haydn Keeton was born in Mosborough. His father Edwin Keeton was organist at Eckington Parish Church. He was a chorister at St. George's Chapel, Windsor Castle, where he studied with George Elvey. He graduated at Oxford as B.Mus. (1869) and D.Mus. (1877). He became the organist and choir master at Peterborough in 1870, where he also conducted the local orchestral society for 25 years and the Choral Union for 20 years.

Some of his more famous pupils include Alfred Whitehead, Malcolm Sargent, and Thomas Armstrong.

His compositions include a Symphony for orchestra, organ voluntaries, piano pieces, songs, services, psalm chants, and anthems including "Give ear, Lord, unto my prayer" (Meadowcroft Prize); also wrote a singing method (London, 1892).

He is buried in Peterborough Cathedral.

== Career ==
Organist of:

- Datchet Parish Church 1867 - 1870
- Peterborough Cathedral 1870 - 1921

Cultural offices
| Preceded by John Speechley | Organist and Master of the Choristers of Peterborough Cathedral; 1870-1921 | Succeeded by Richard Henry Coleman |
