= Charles Robert Francis =

United States Marine Corps Medal of Honor recipient

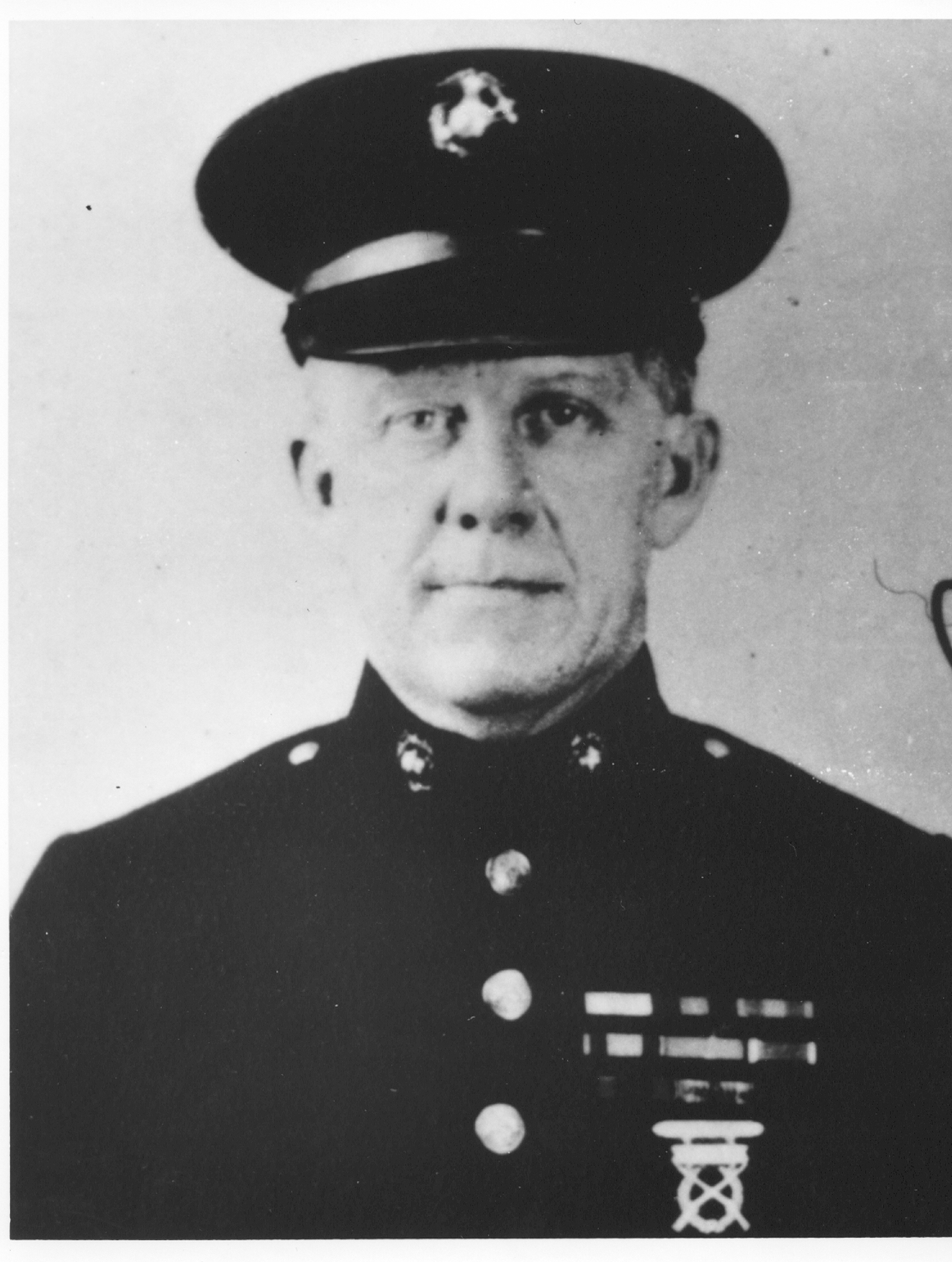
- Charles Robert Francis
- Born: May 19, 1875; Doylestown, Pennsylvania
- Died: July 15, 1946 (aged 71); Santa Monica, California, U.S.
- Burial place: Hollywood Forever Cemetery, Los Angeles, California
- Military career
- Allegiance: United States
- Branch: United States Marine Corps
- Service years: 1898–1923
- Rank: Sergeant Major
- Conflicts: China Relief Expedition
- Awards: Medal of Honor

Charles Robert Francis (May 19, 1875 – July 15, 1946) was a Marine who received the Medal of Honor for actions on June 21, 1900, near Tianjin, China during the Boxer Rebellion.

Francis was born in Doylestown, Pennsylvania, and was a private. He later obtained the rank of sergeant major. Sergeant Major Francis is buried at Hollywood Forever Cemetery.

== Medal of Honor citation ==
Francis, Charles Robert, Private, U.S. Marine Corps, G.O. Navy Department, No.55, July 19, 1901

Citation:

In the presence of the enemy during the battle near Tientsin, China, 21 June 1900, Francis distinguished himself by meritorious conduct.

== See also ==
- List of Medal of Honor recipients
