= George Good =

George Fitzgerald Good (16 June 1919 - 15 March 2010) was Dean of Derry from 1967 until 1984.

Born in 1919, he was educated at Trinity College, Dublin and ordained in 1943. Good began his ecclesiastical career as a curate at Drumglass. He was Clerical Vicar of Christ Church Cathedral, Dublin from 1945 to 1949 after which held incumbencies at Innishkeel and then Raphoe until his elevation to the deanery as Dean of Raphoe from 1962 to 1967. He was then appointed Dean of Derry.

He rented the main part of Foyle Park in Eglinton for 10 years. He then left to live in Portnoo, Donegal. George Good died on March 15, 2010.
