= St Columb's Cathedral =

Coordinates: 54°59′38″N 7°19′23″W

St Columb's Cathedral, Derry
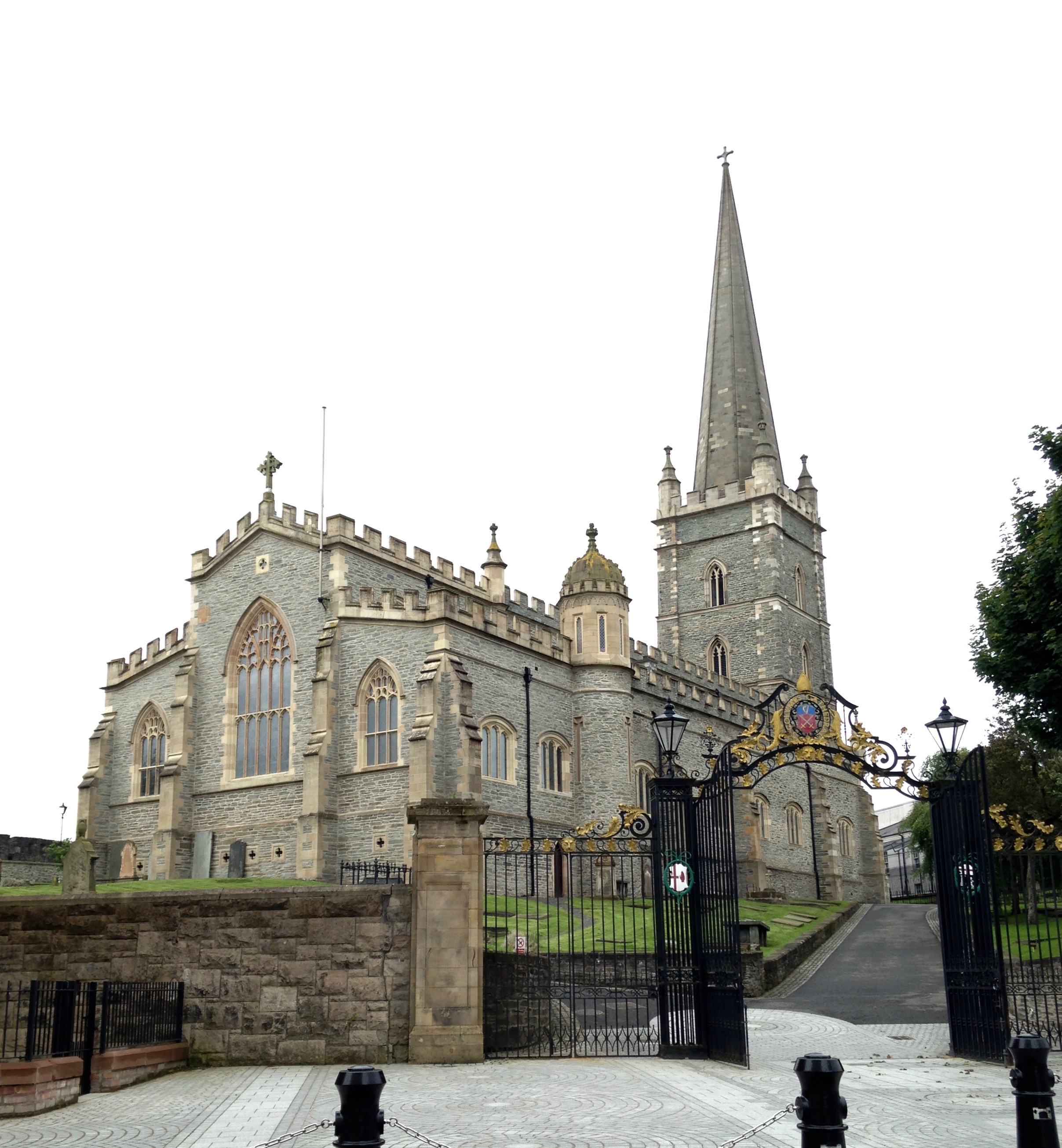
- Cathedral Church of St Columb, Derry City

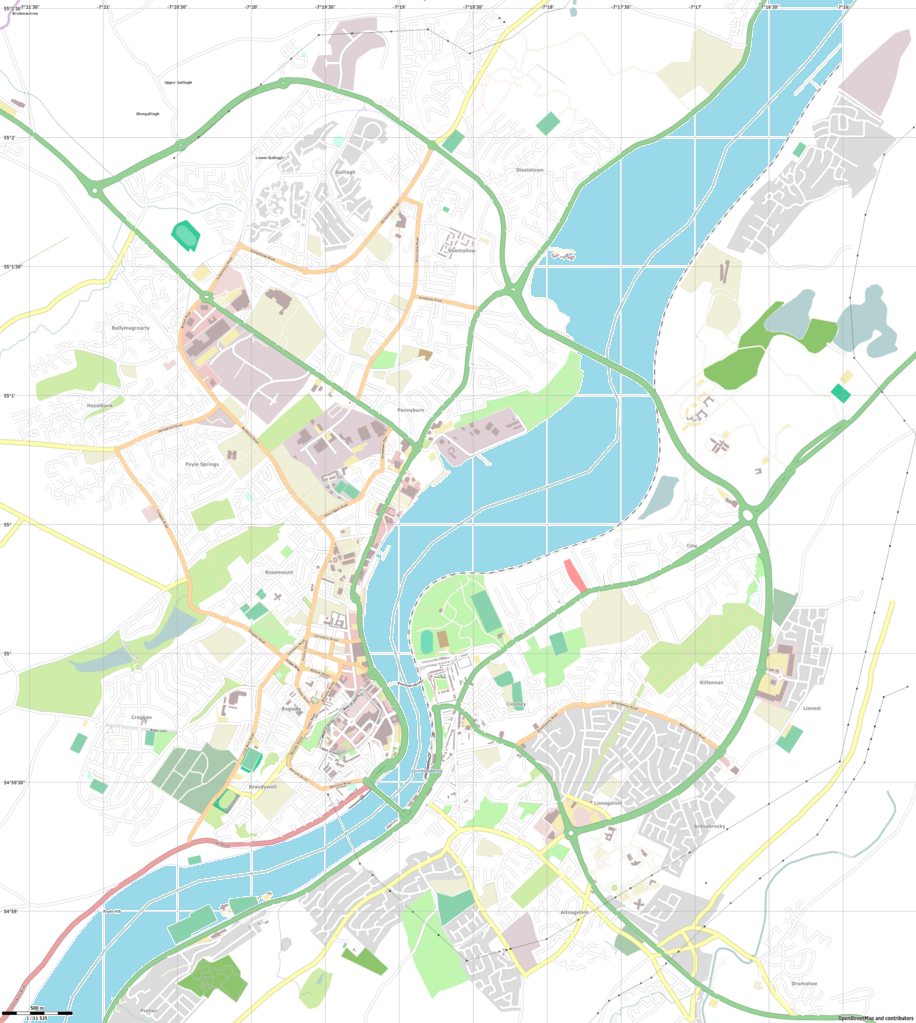
- Shown within Derry
- Location: Derry
- Country: Northern Ireland
- Denomination: Church of Ireland
- Churchmanship: Broad Church
- Website: stcolumbscathedral.org

History
- Dedication: St Columba

Administration
- Province: Armagh
- Diocese: Derry and Raphoe

Clergy
- Bishop: The Right Revd. Dr Andrew Forster
- Dean: Vacant Rev'd Robert Boyd Rev'd Donard Collins Rev'd Peter Ferguson

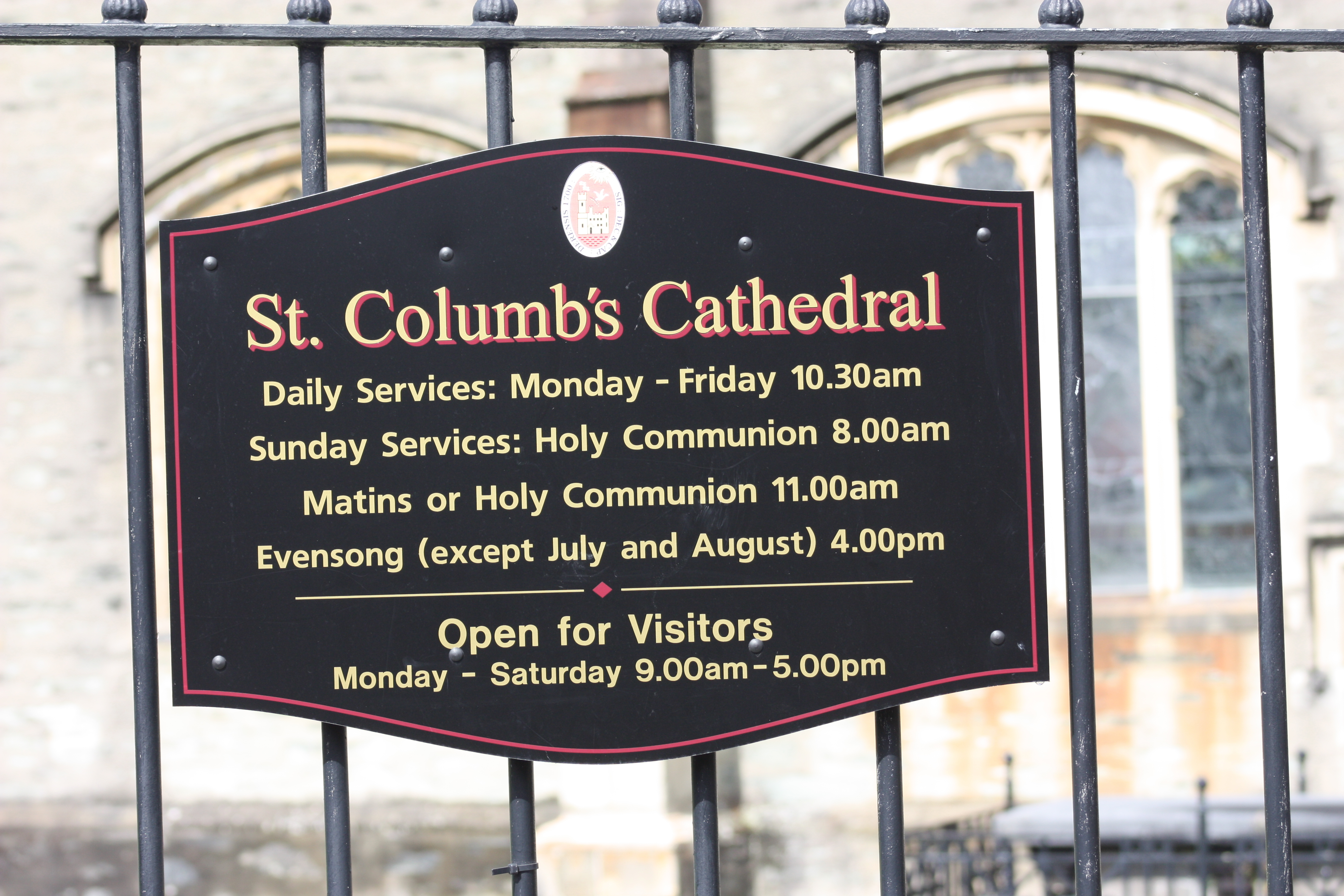
St Columb's Cathedral, August 2009

St Columb's Cathedral in the walled city of Derry, Northern Ireland, is the cathedral church and episcopal see of the Church of Ireland's Diocese of Derry and Raphoe. It is also the parish church of Templemore. It is dedicated to Saint Columba, the Irish monk who established a Christian settlement in the area before being exiled from Ireland and introducing Christianity to Scotland and northern England. Built after the Reformation in Ireland, St Columb's is the first Anglican cathedral to have been built in Britain and Ireland after the Reformation and was the first non-Roman Catholic cathedral to be built in Western Europe.

== History ==
The original site of the diocesan cathedral was in Templemore (Irish: An Teampalll Mór or "the Big Church"). Due to the violence of the Nine Years' War, the church was destroyed. It was first damaged by an accidental explosion on 24 April 1568, the church having been appropriated for the storage of gunpowder. On 16 April 1600, Sir Henry Docwra entered Derry with a force of 4,000 soldiers. He tore down the ruins of the Big Church and used its stones to build the walls and ramparts of the city. A small square stone tablet from An Teampall Mór is today fixed into the porch of the present structure. The Latin inscription reads "In Templo Vervs Devs Est Vere Colendvs" ("The True God is in His Temple and is to be truly worshipped"). The cathedral is located close to the original.

The present church was built by William Parratt, from London, and was consecrated in 1633. It is a good example of "Gothic survival" in the English Gothic architecture of the 17th century, contemporary with the college chapel of Peterhouse, Cambridge. The style has been called "Planter's Gothic". Foundations for a chancel extending the east end were laid in 1633, but the building work advanced no further. In the porch is an inscription:

If stones could speake
then London's prayse
should sound who
built this church and
cittie from the grounde.

After its consecration in 1633, the church was nearly unaltered until the bishop in 1776, Frederick Hervey, 4th Earl of Bristol, extended the total height of the building to 221 feet (67 m) by building up the tower by 21 feet (6.4 m) and adding a very tall spire. This spire lasted only two decades before it threatened to collapse and was dismantled for rebuilding. The tower was finished in 1802, but the replacement spire was built another two decades later. The original south porch, attached to the hitherto unaltered nave, was removed in 1825, and in 1827 the turrets on either side of the east end were remodelled, with their previously crenellated tops rebuilt with domes.

In 1861–1862, the whole interior was remodelled with new woodwork in oak, and the galleries which had previously been in the aisles were removed. Other decorations and furnishings were replaced at the same time. In 1887, in beginning work for a new chancel, the 17th-century foundations were unearthed, and the new chancel was constructed on their plan, completing the church's intended form.

The chapter house was built in 1910.

St Columb's has in its possession many documents dating back from the Siege of Derry. They have portraits of William of Orange and the original keys of the city.

The cathedral also contains a memorial to Valentine Munbee McMaster VC.

== Services ==
The cathedral has three Sunday services, 8:00 am Eucharist, 11:00 am Sung Eucharist (1st and 3rd Sundays of the month), Matins (all other Sundays of the month), 10:00 am Family Service (4th Sunday of the month) and 4:00 pm Choral Evensong.

On weekdays Morning Prayer is celebrated Mondays, Wednesdays, Thursdays and Fridays at 10:30 am and on Tuesdays Holy Communion is celebrated with intercessions for the sick.

The Dean of 19 years, the Reverend William Morton, on 18 September 2016 and was appointed dean of St Patrick's Cathedral, Dublin. In the transition period, before the appointment of a new dean, the Bishop of Derry and Raphoe, Ken Good, appointed the Reverend Canon Mervyn T. E. Peoples to assist the cathedral's curate, the Reverend Canon John Merrick.

On 4 December 2016, Bishop Good appointed the Reverend Canon Raymond Stewart as the new dean of Saint Columb's Cathedral and rector of the Parish of Templemore. Canon Stewart was inaugurated on 28 March 2017 at the cathedral by Bishop Good and succeeded the Rev William Morton.

Dean Stewart has announced his intention to stand down as Dean of St. Columb's Cathedral and Rector of the parish of Templemore and retire from full-time ministry after almost 9 years of service as Dean and 47 years in active ministry in the Diocese of Derry and Raphoe. After several battles of ill health. The Dean has said his time in active ministry is becoming outdated and looks forward to spending a healthy retirement with his family after almost half a century in active ministry. A date for his departure is due to be scheduled by the end of 2025.

On Sunday 26 April 2026, it was confirmed by the Diocese of Derry and Raphoe that the Reverend Nigel Cairns will become the new Dean of Derry which will now encompass not only St Columb's Cathedral but also St Augustine's Church, located on the City Walls of Derry, not far from the cathedral. Reverend Cairns is the current rector of St Augustine's, and this will be the first time that the two churches will now be united under the leadership of one rector. It is expected that a Service of Installation will be held in early summer 2026 at which the Dean-elect will formally succeed Very Rev Raymond Stewart who retired at the end of last year.

== Organists ==
- 1873-1878 James Turpin
- 1878-1911 Daniel Jones
- 1912-1914 Sydney Weale
- 1914-1921 Richard Henry Coleman
- 1921-1948 John T Frankland
- 1948-1968 Michael H Franklin
- 1968-1971 Neil Wade
- 1971 Ian Barber
- 1972-1980 Michael Hoeg
- 1981-1982 Marc Rochester
- 1982-1988 William West
- 1988-1990 Alexander Best
- 1990-1991 William West
- 1991-2001 Timothy Allen
- 2002-2004 Jonathan Lane
- 2005-2018 Ian Kenneth Mills
- 2018-2024 Derek Collins
- 2024- Nicky Morton

== Burials ==
- William Nicolson, Bishop of Derry (1718–1727)
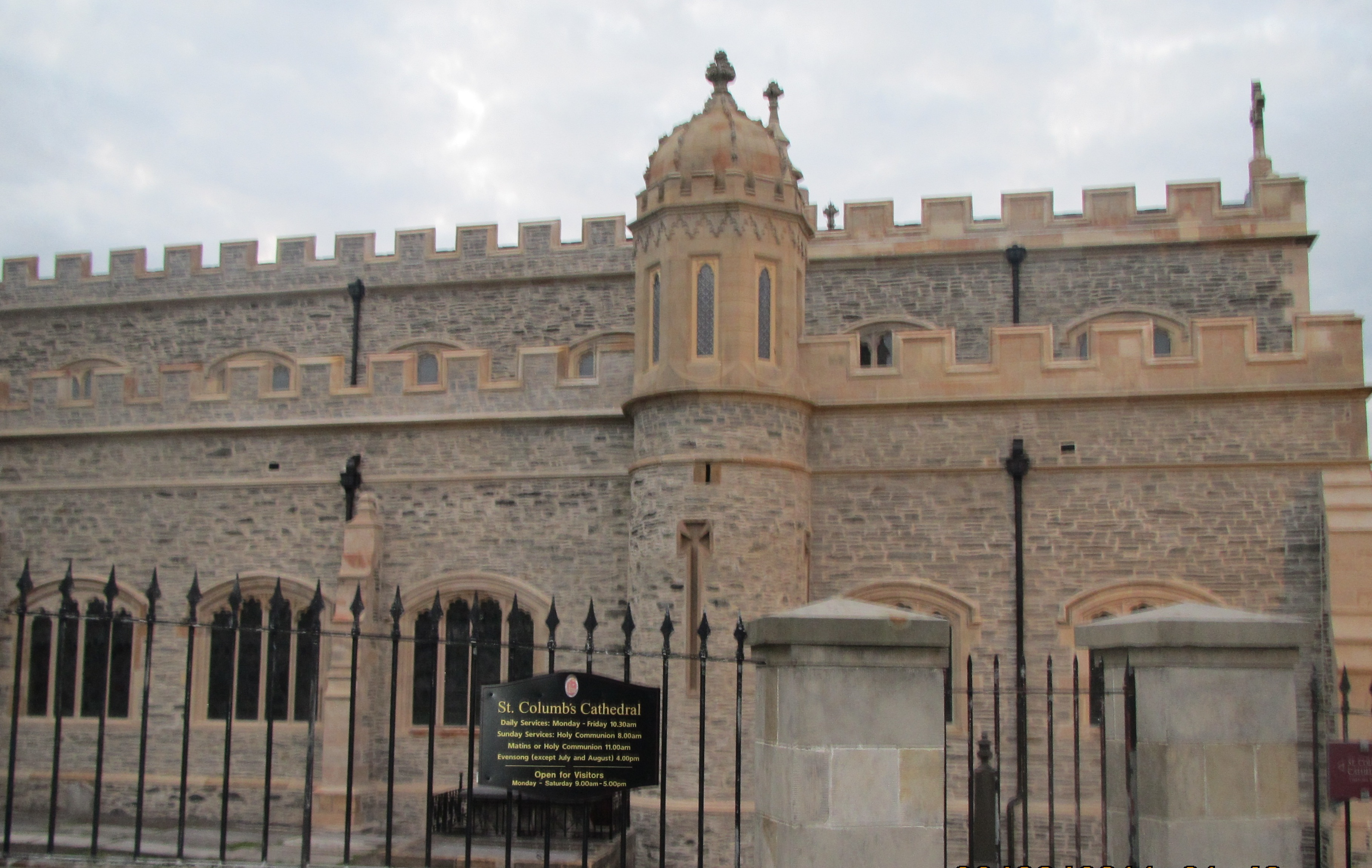

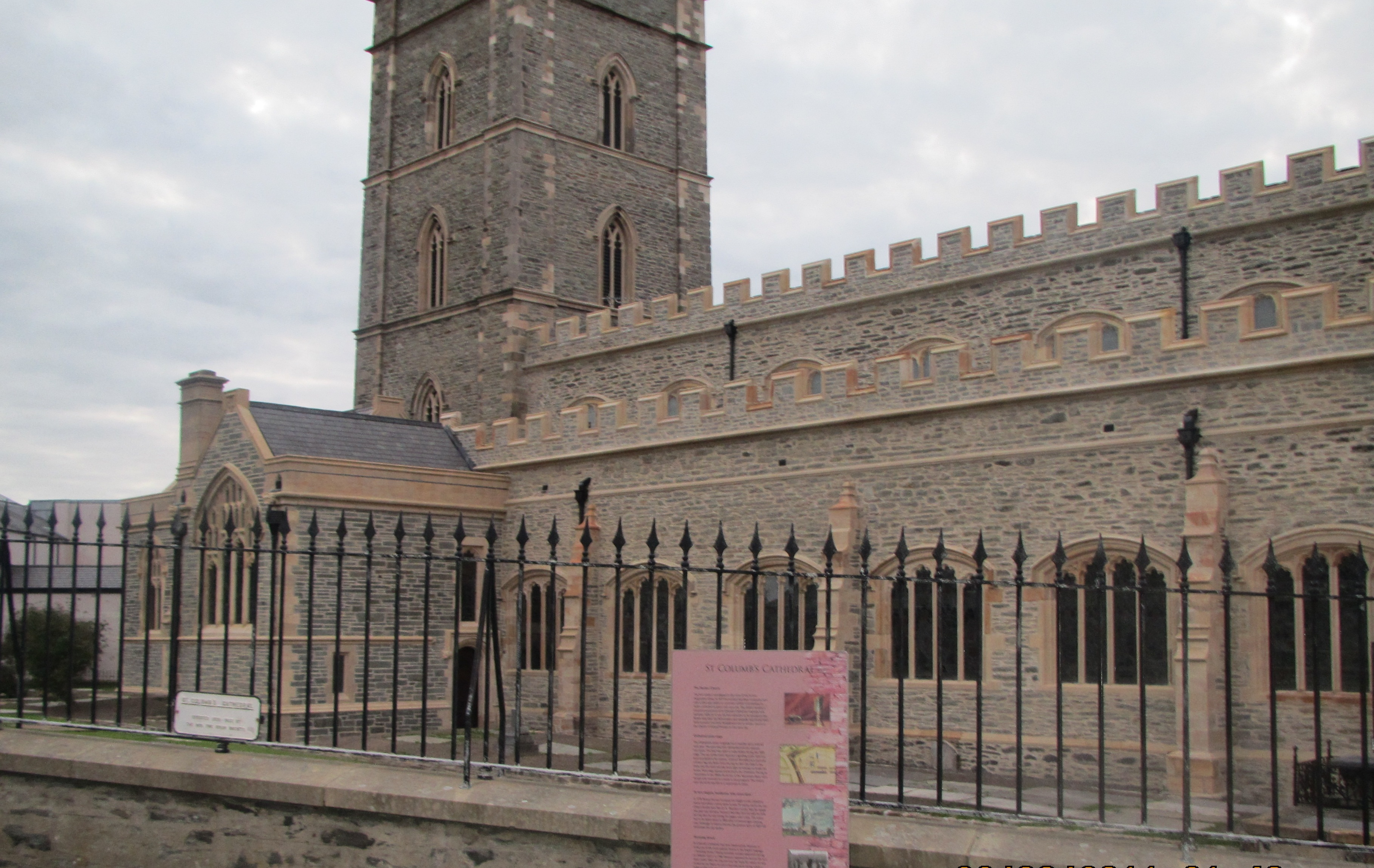

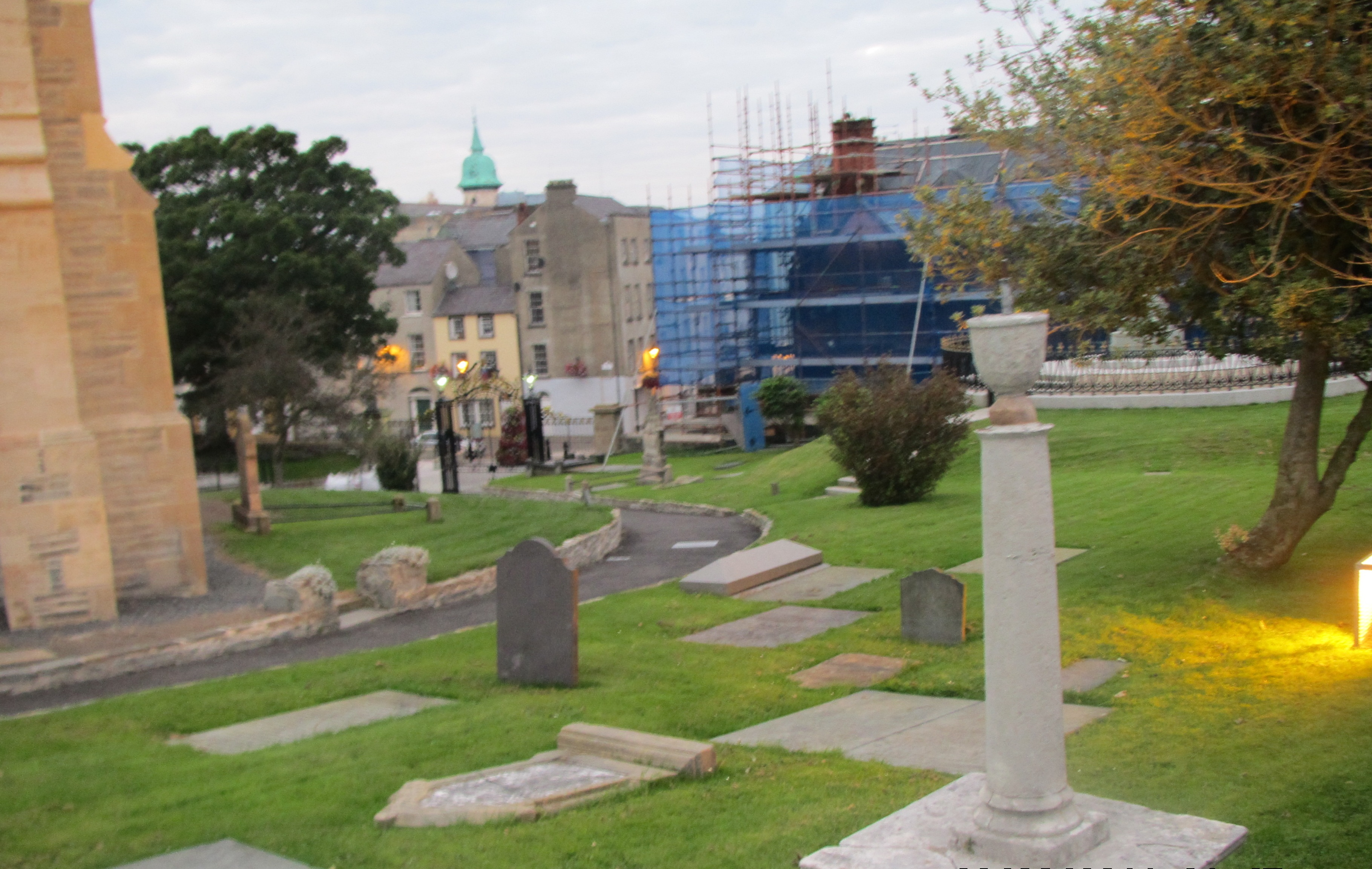

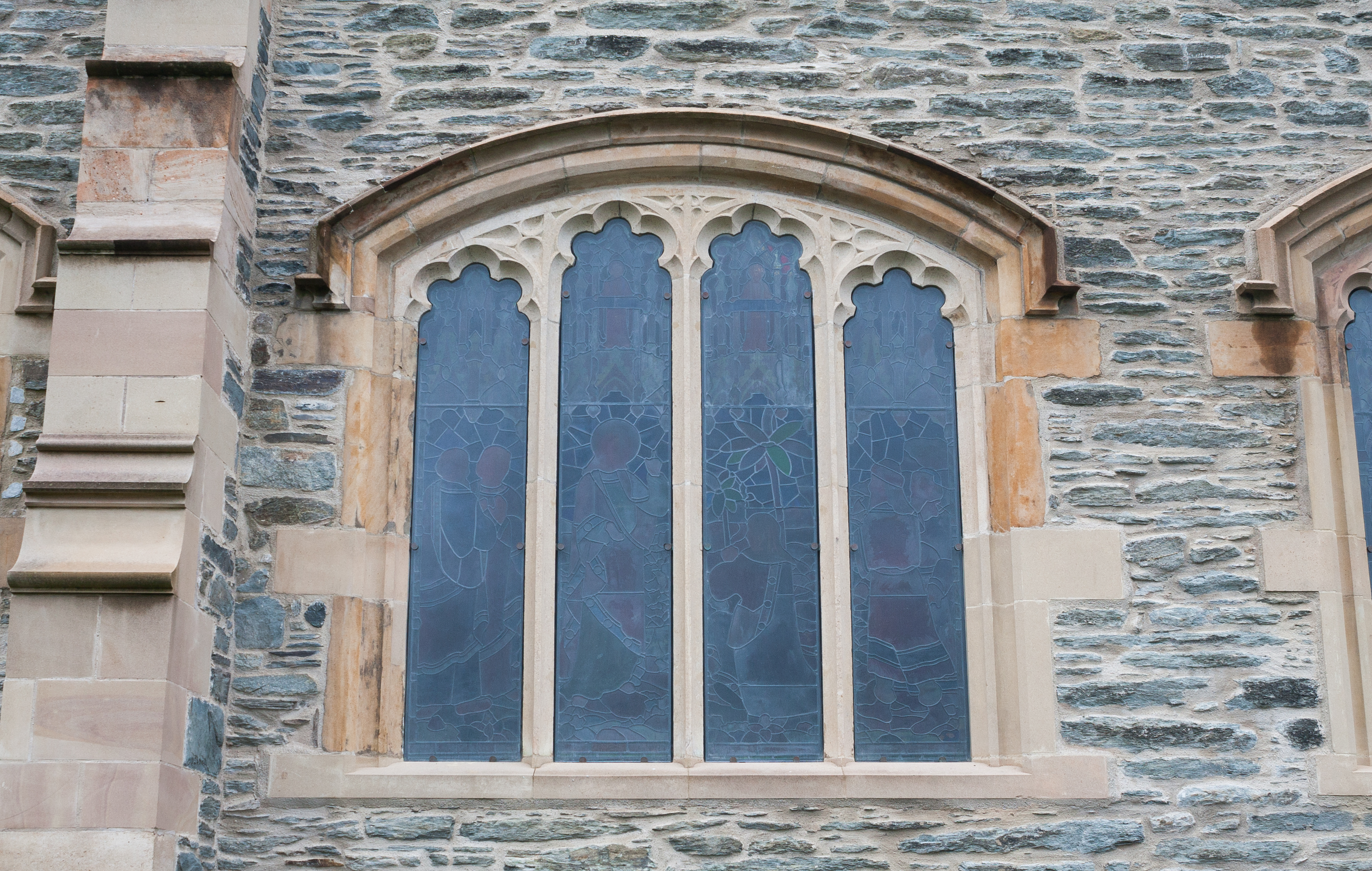
Perpendicular Gothic tracery

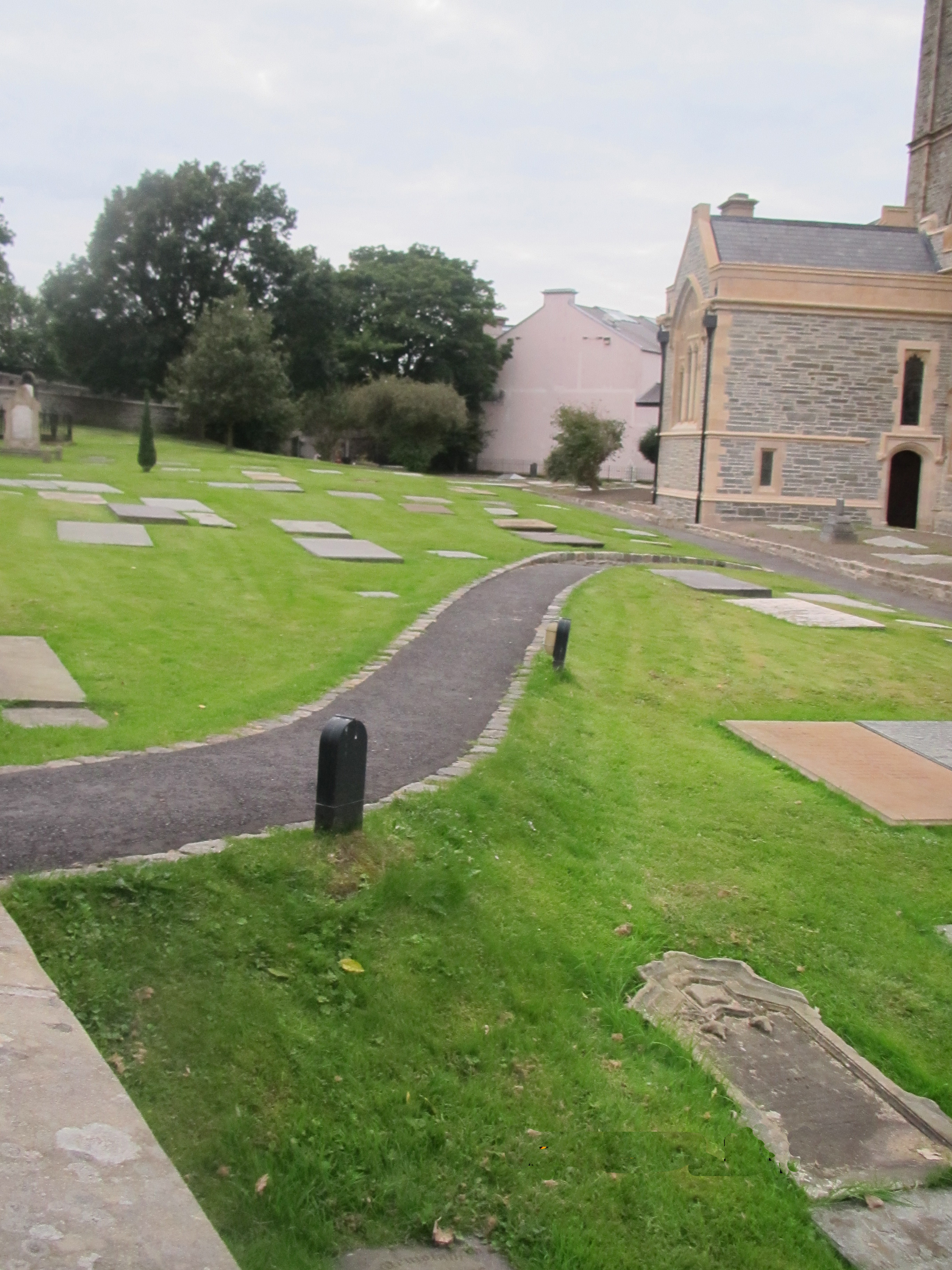

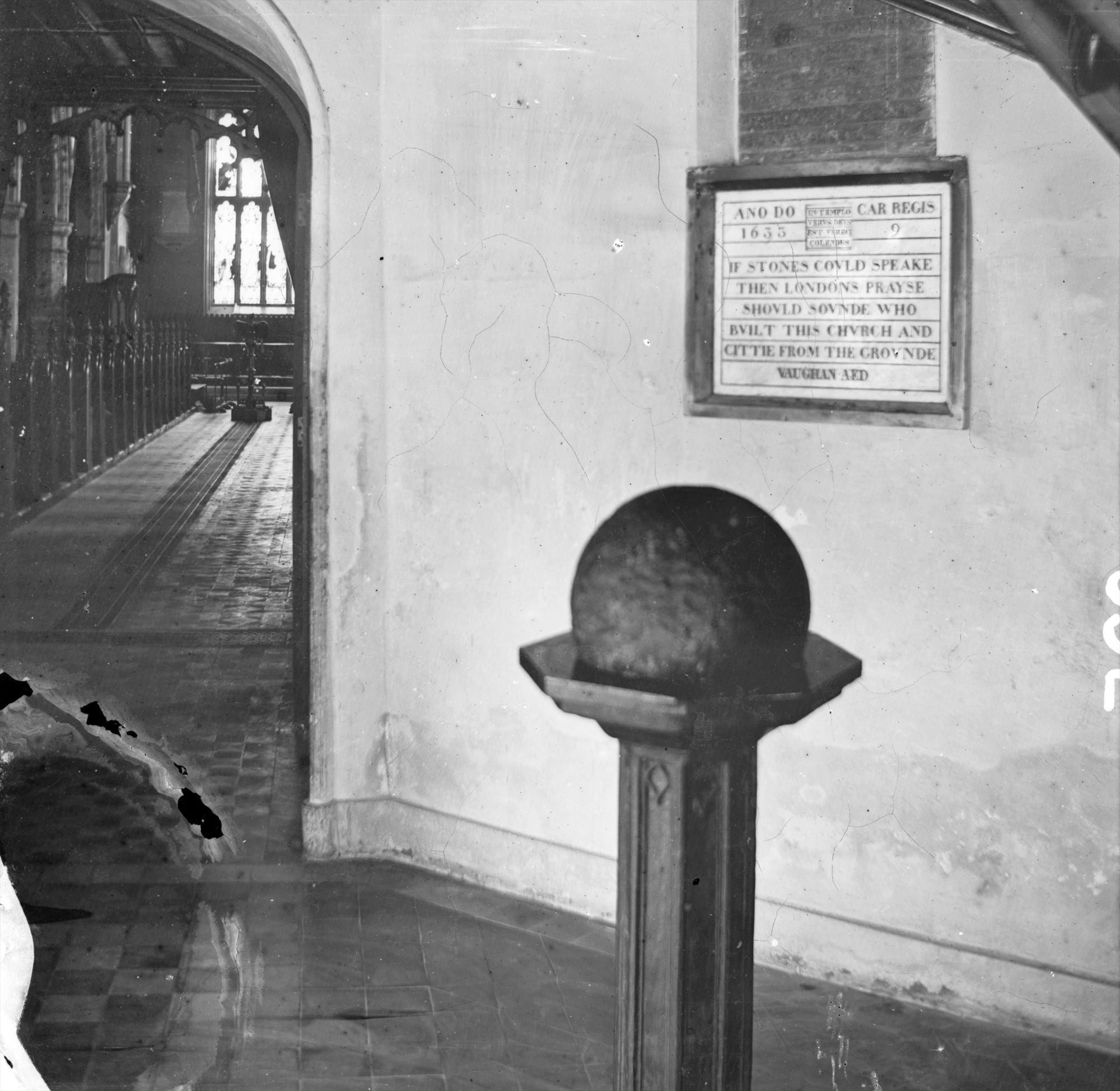
The Bomb Font (A cannonball) inside the Cathedral

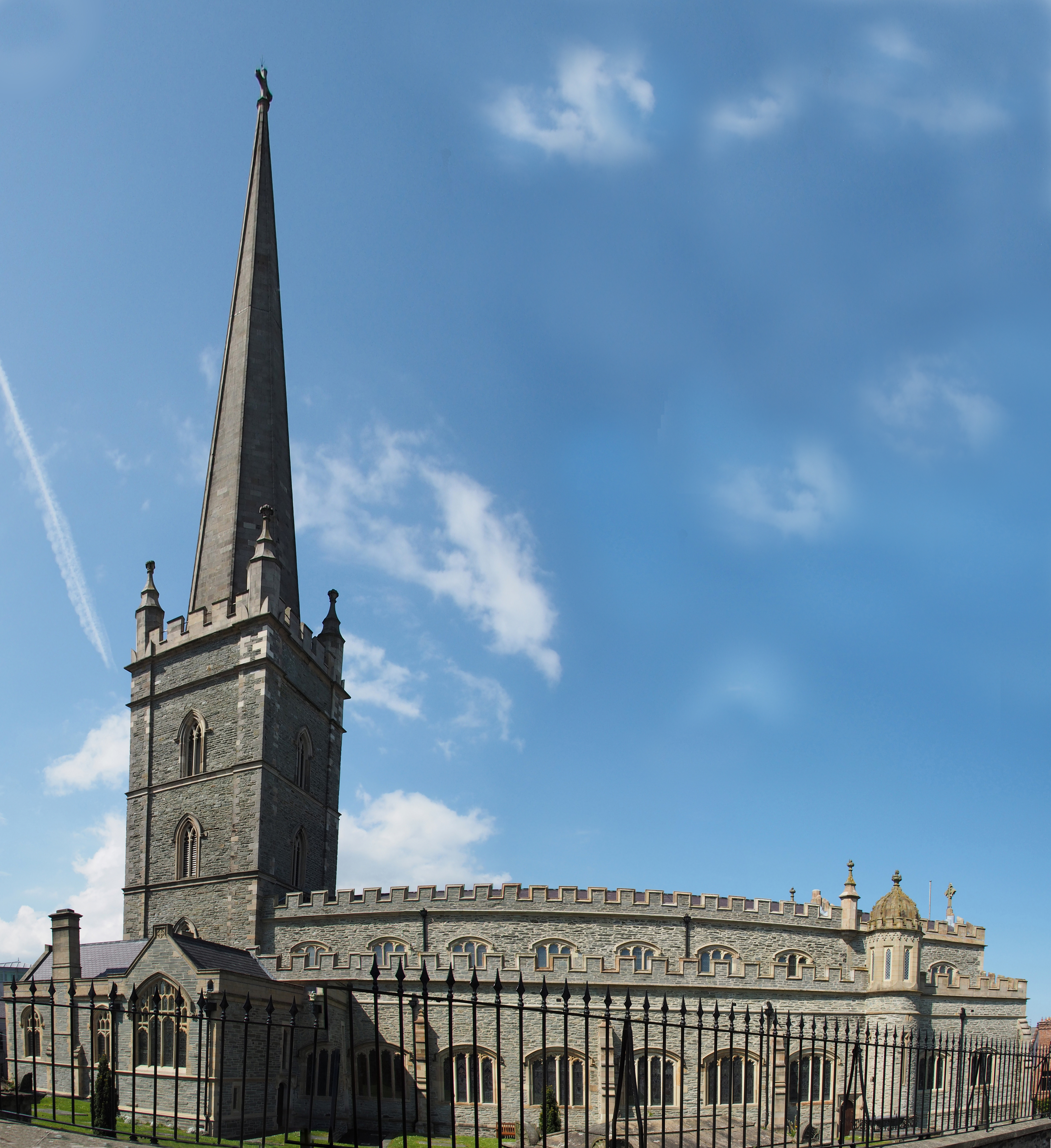
South elevation

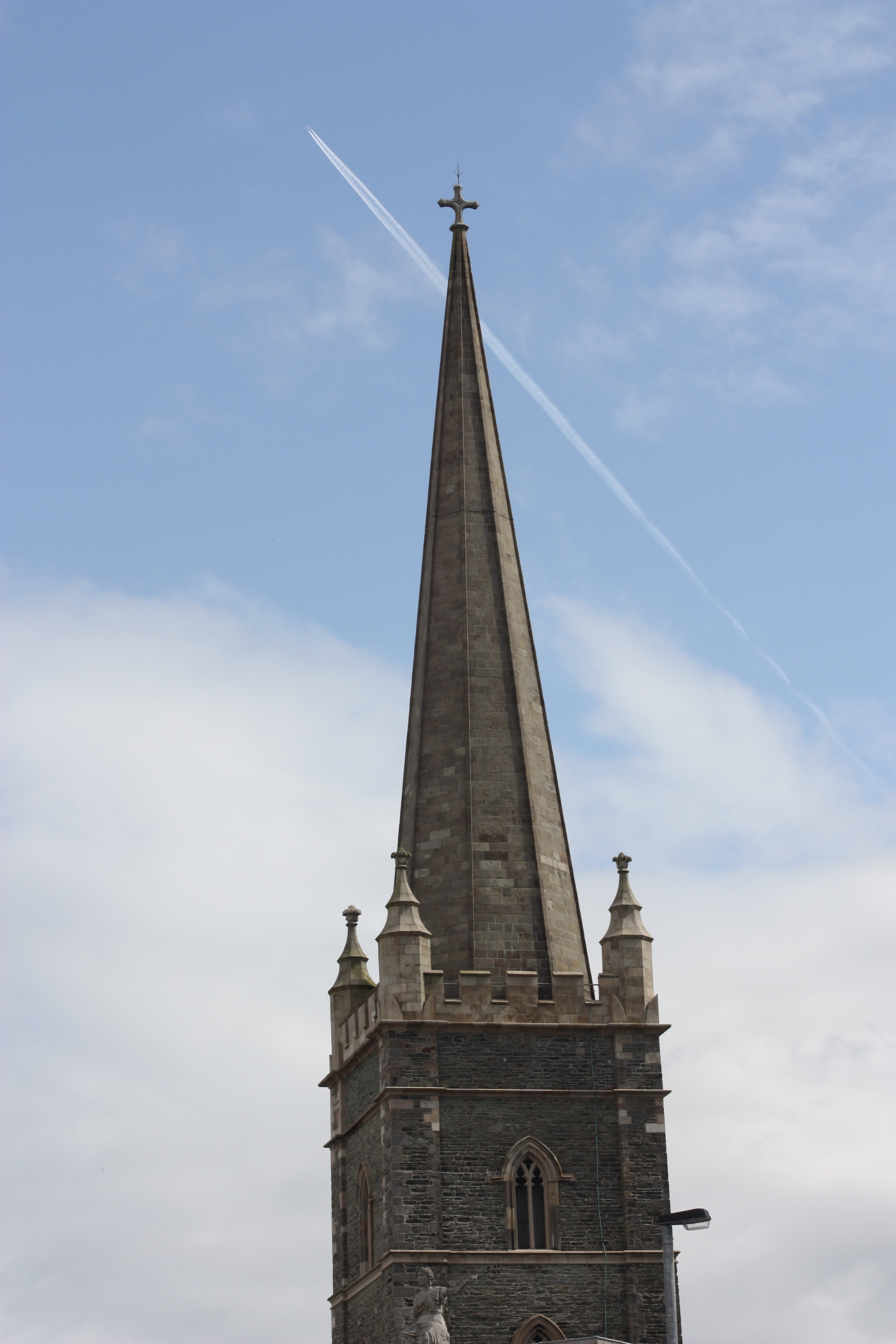
19th-century tower and spire

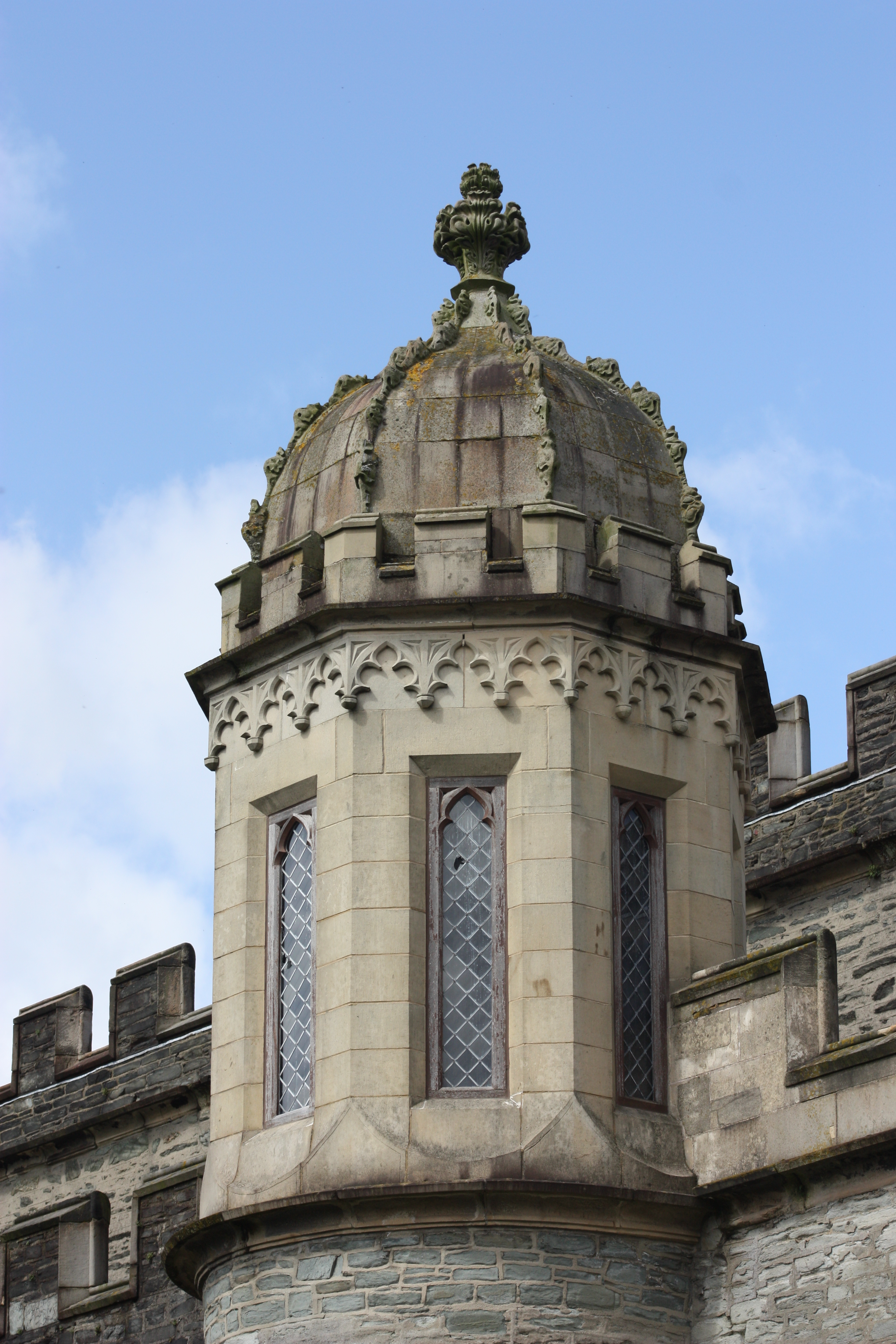
Dome

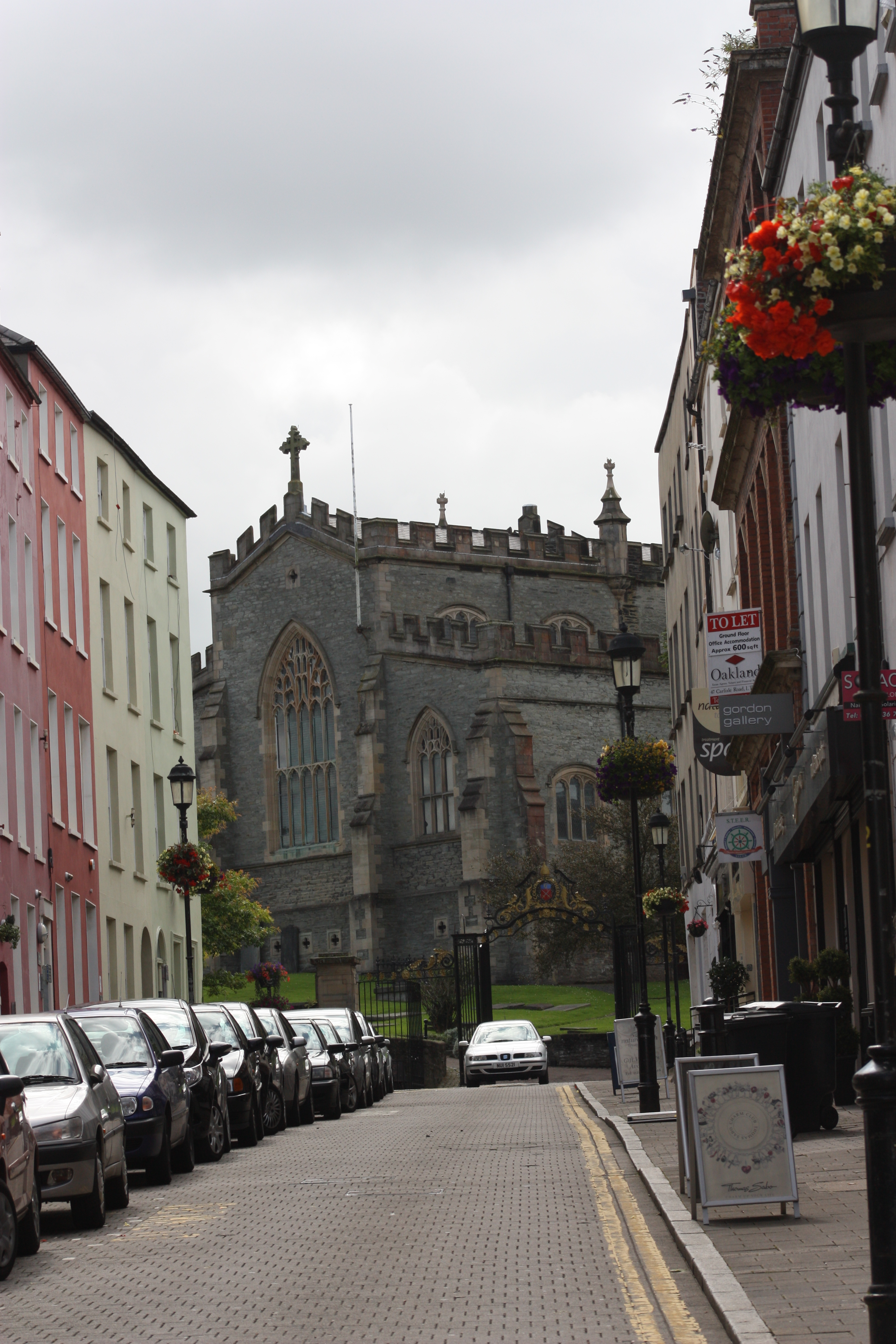
19th-century chancel

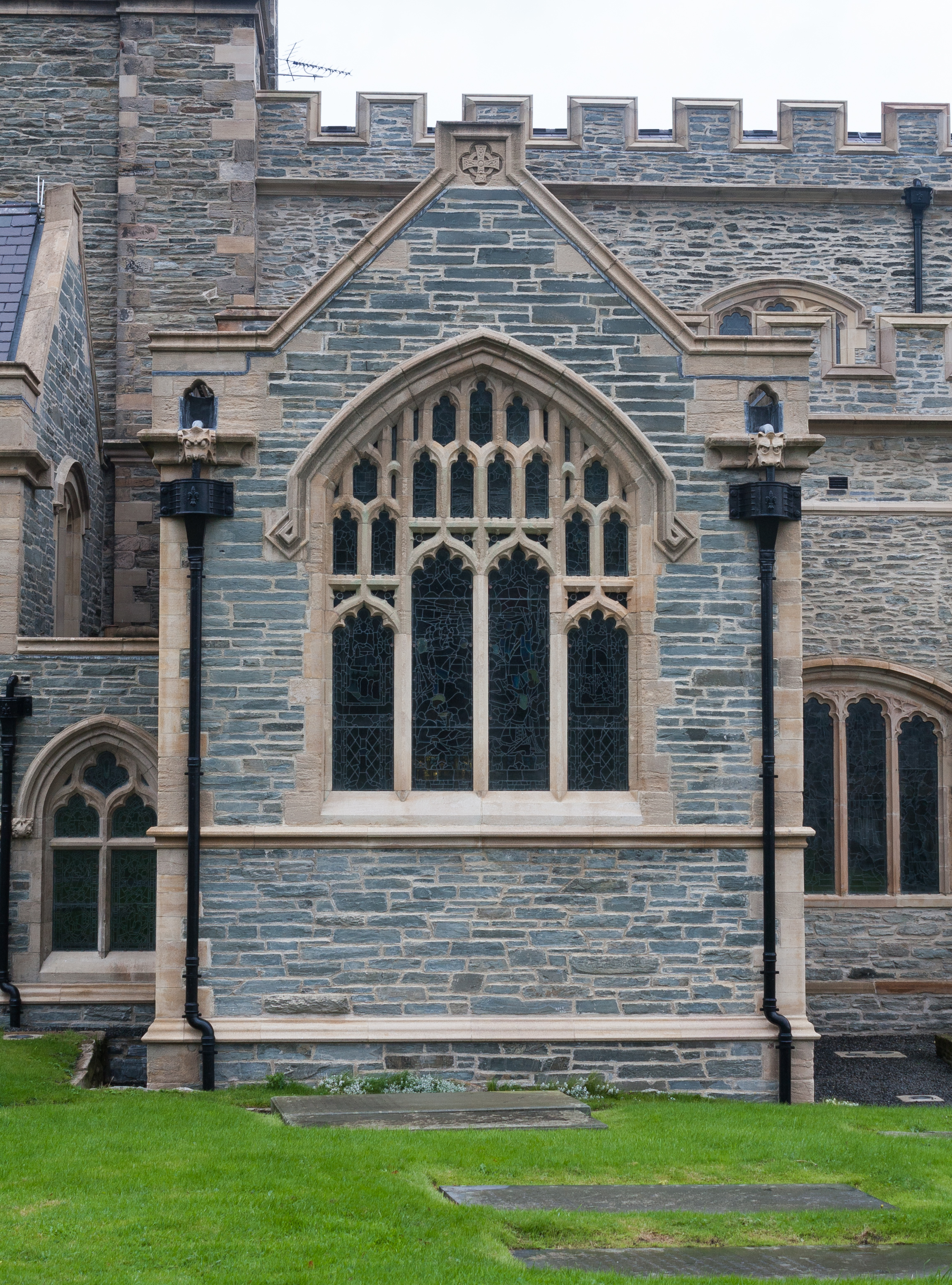
20th-century chapter house, Perpendicular Gothic tracery

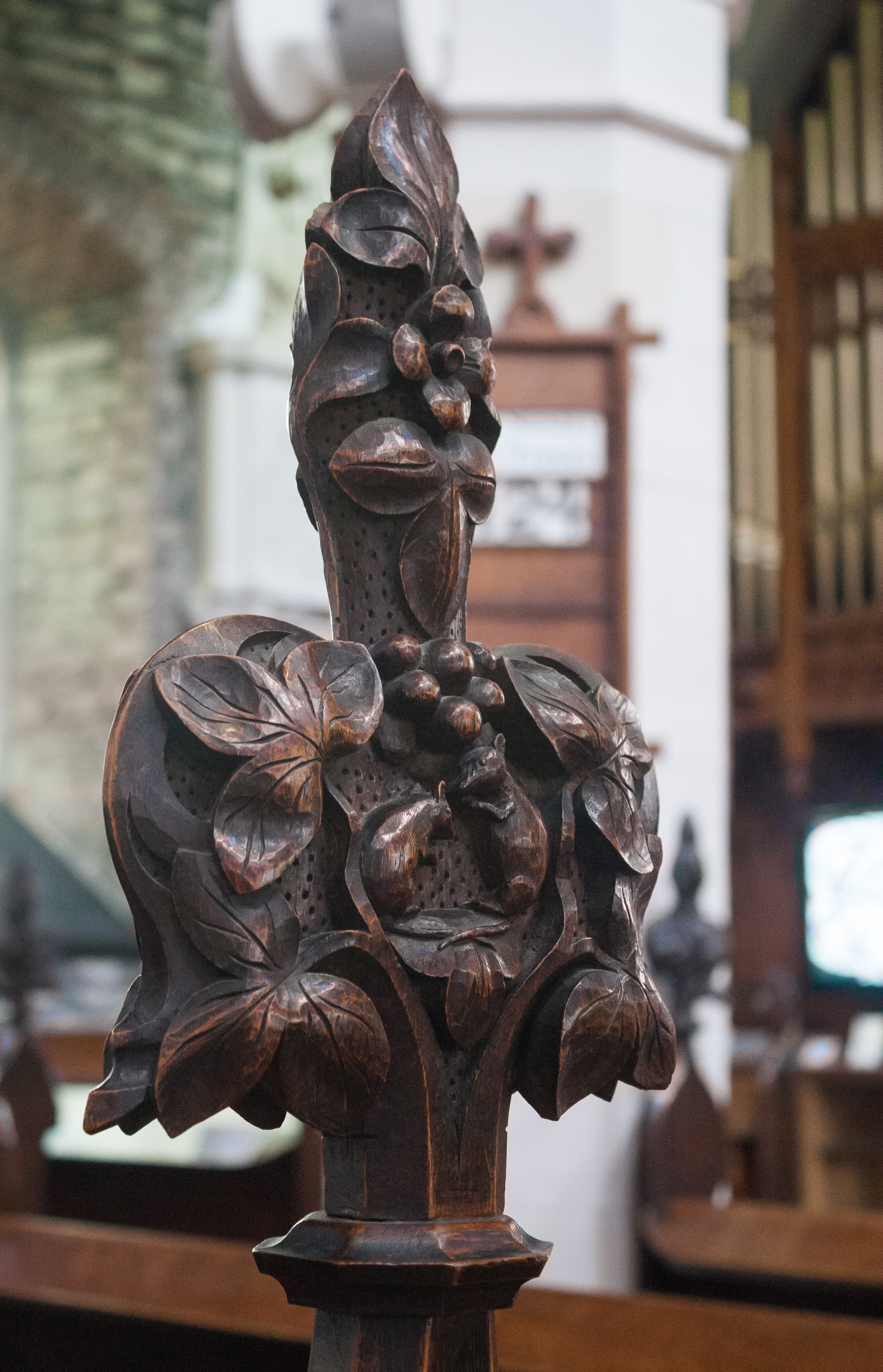
Decorative finial with mice on a 19th-century pew

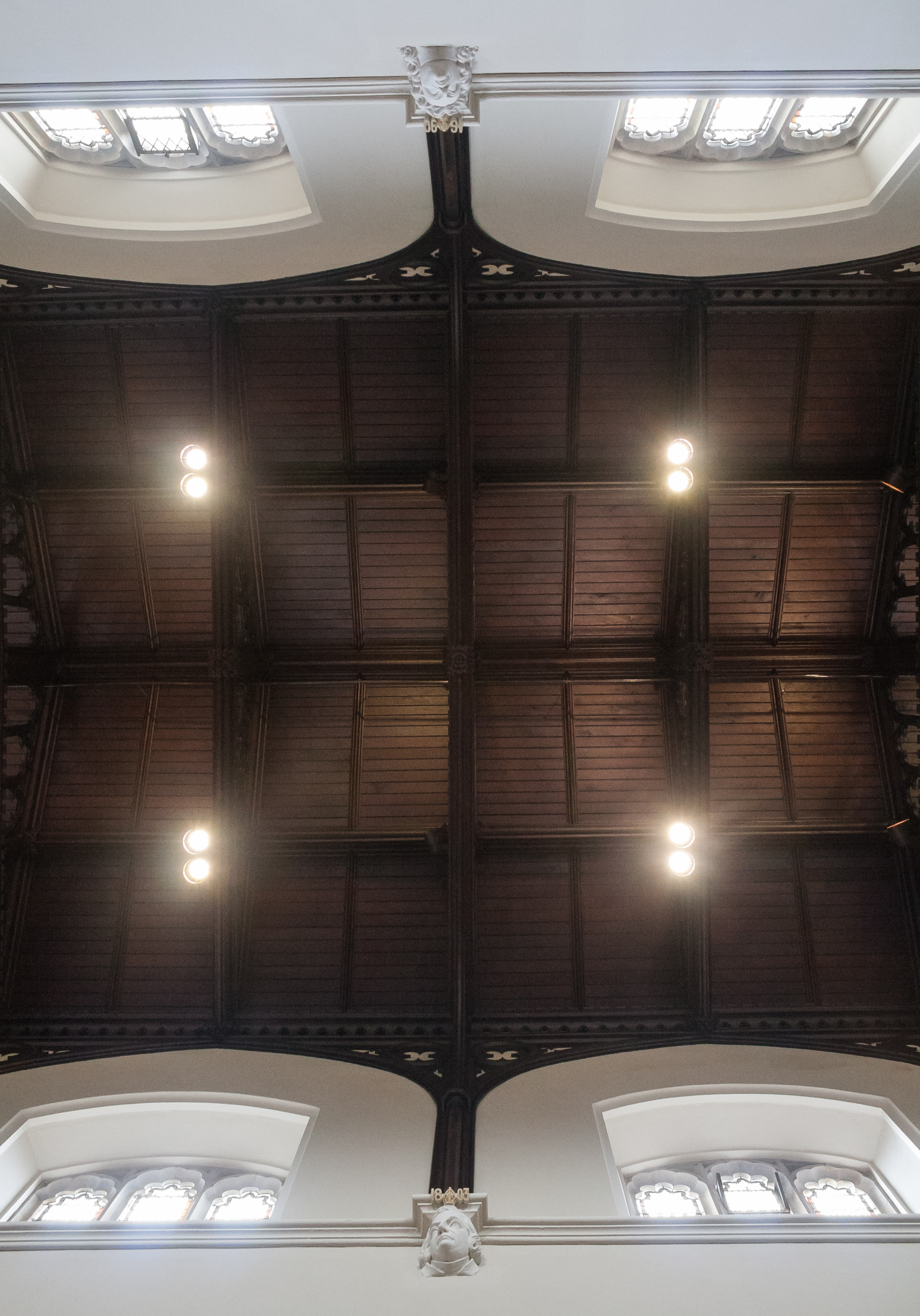
Timber ceiling

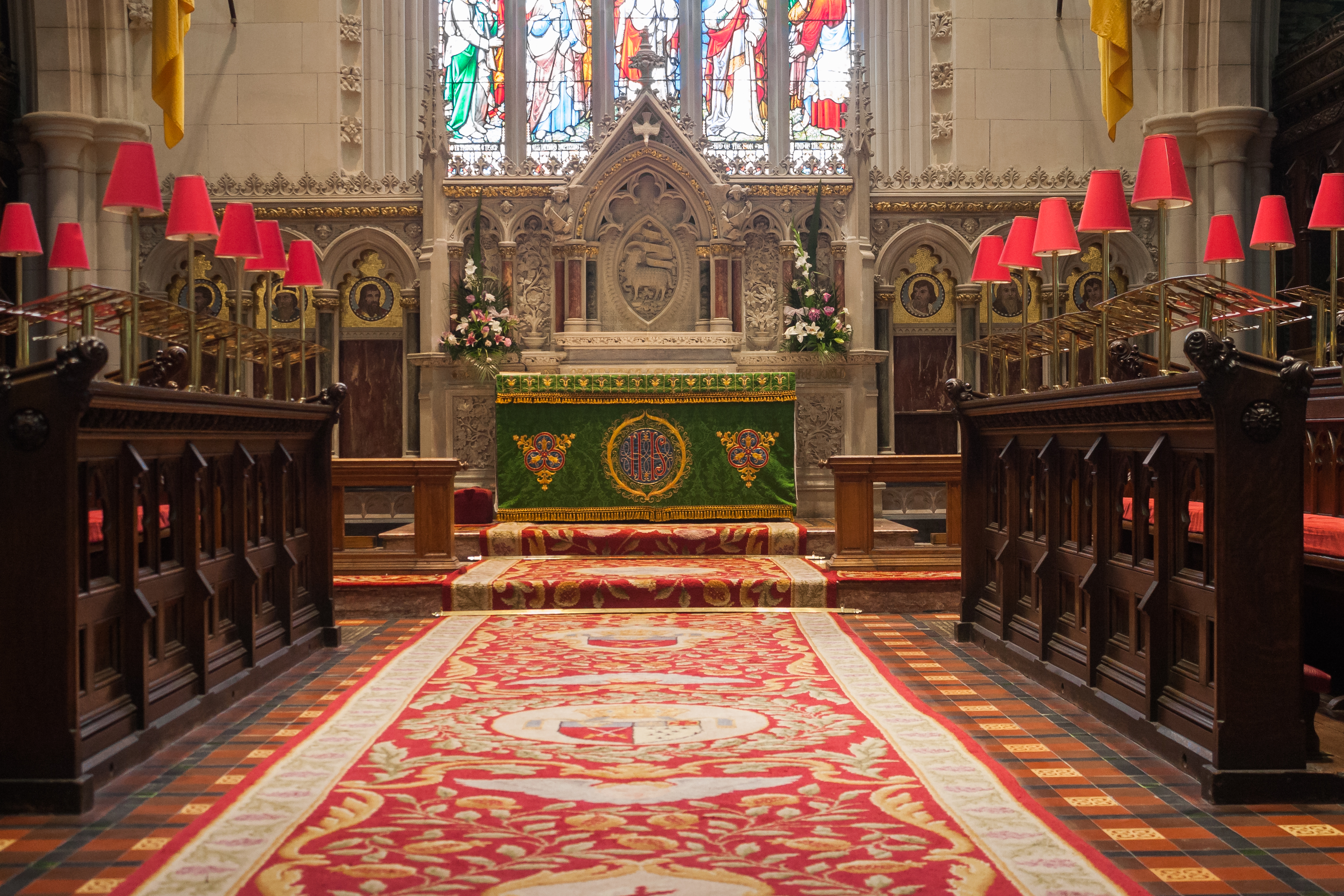
High altar and choir stalls in the chancel

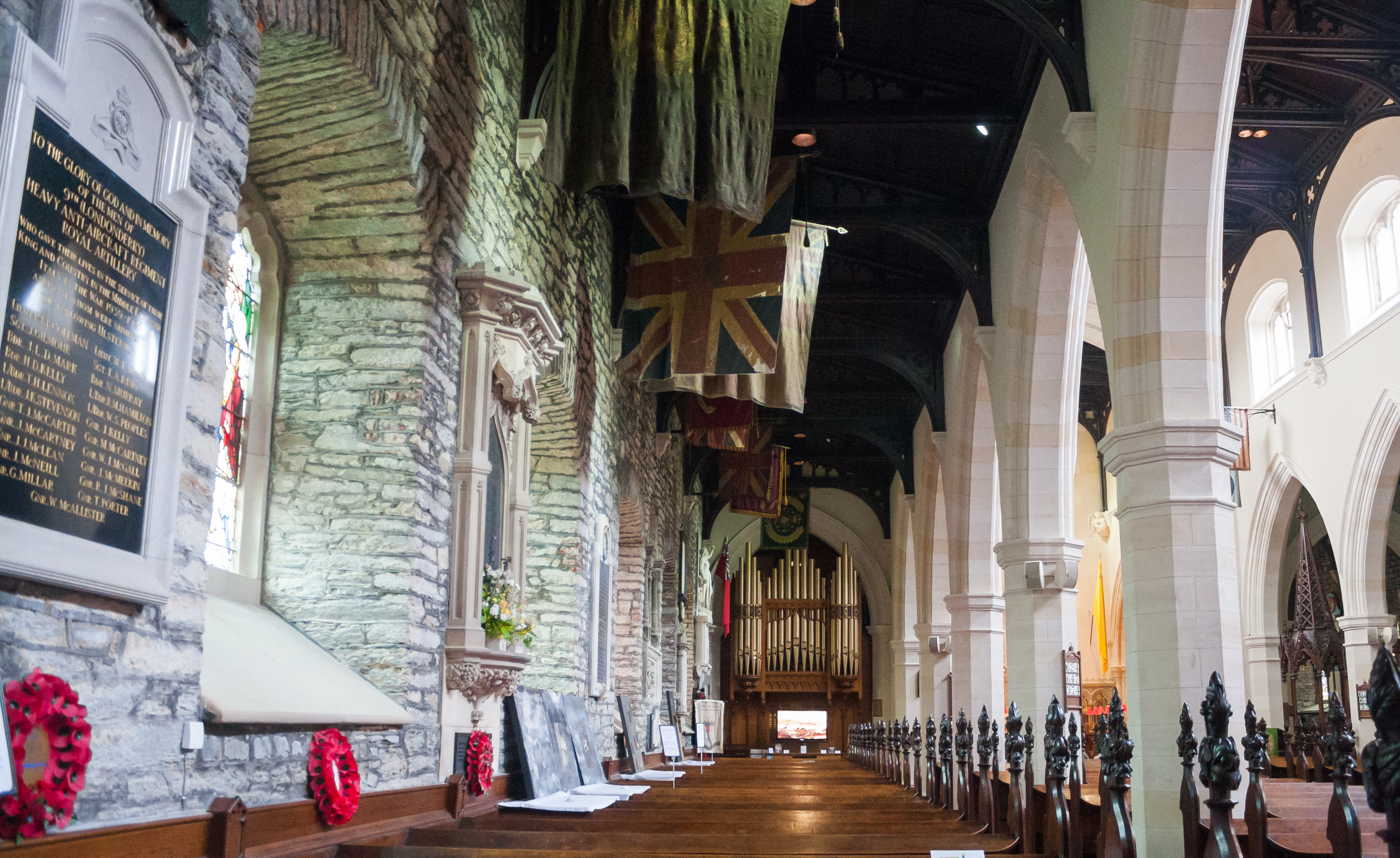
North aisle

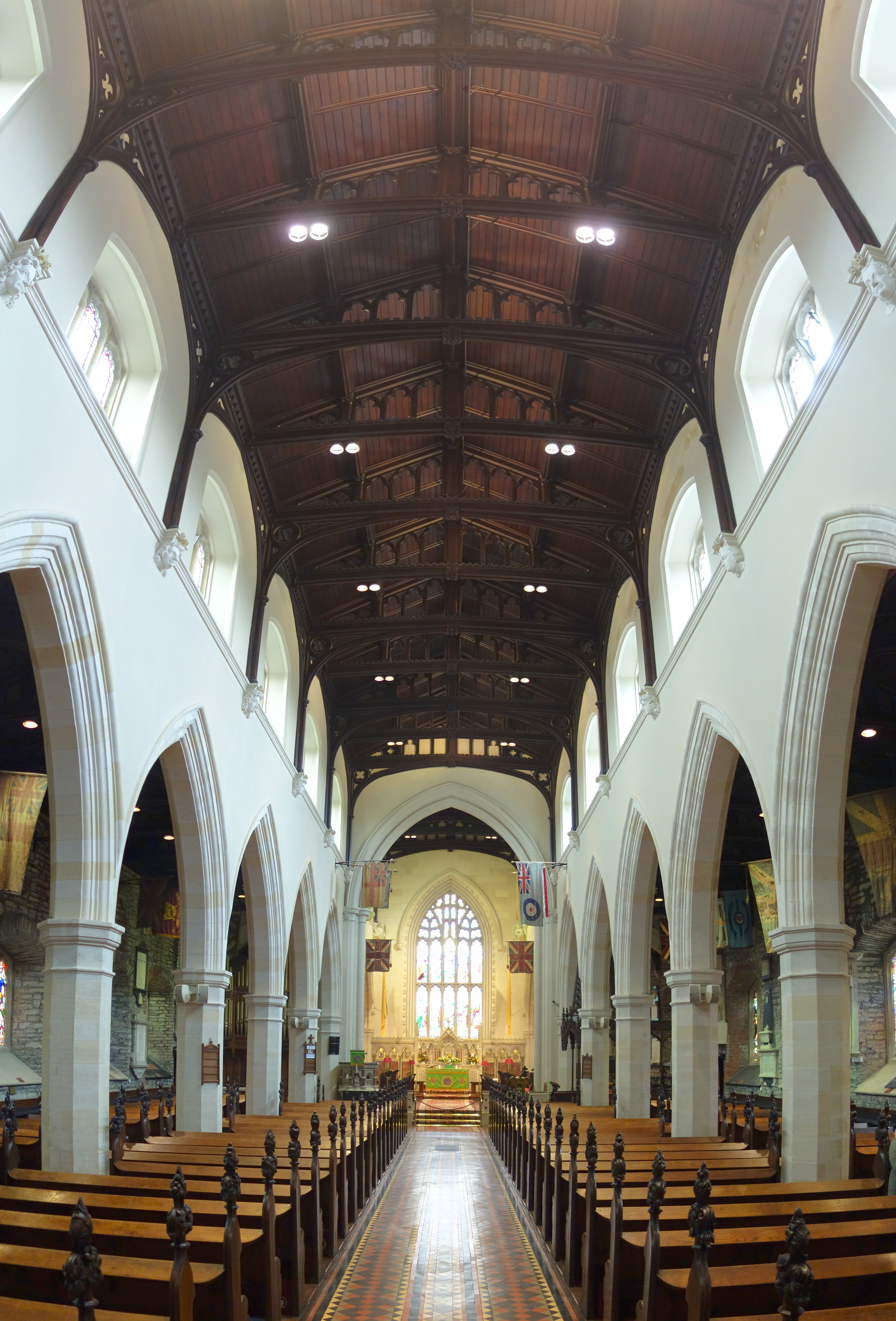
Nave, looking east

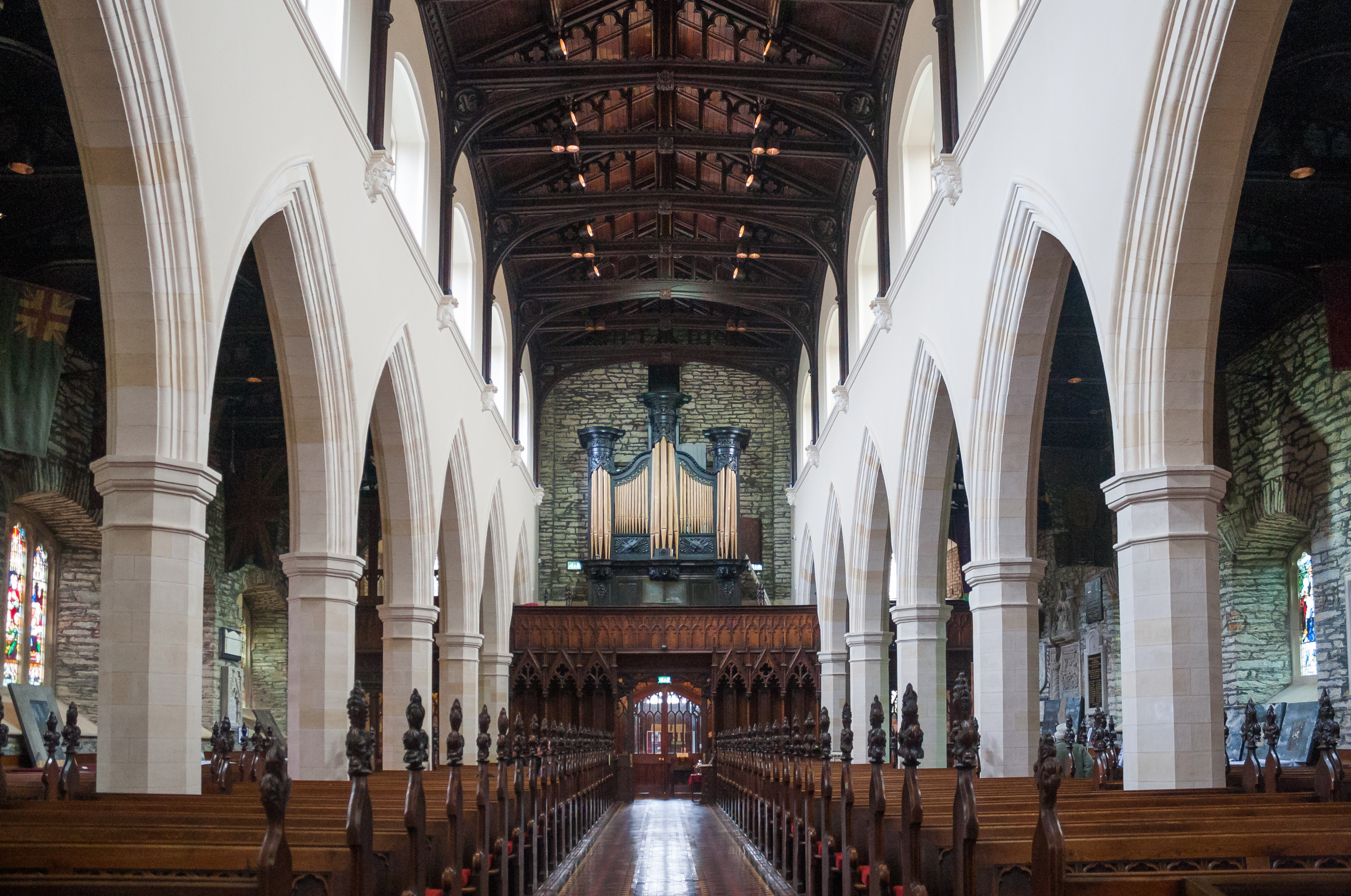
Nave, looking west

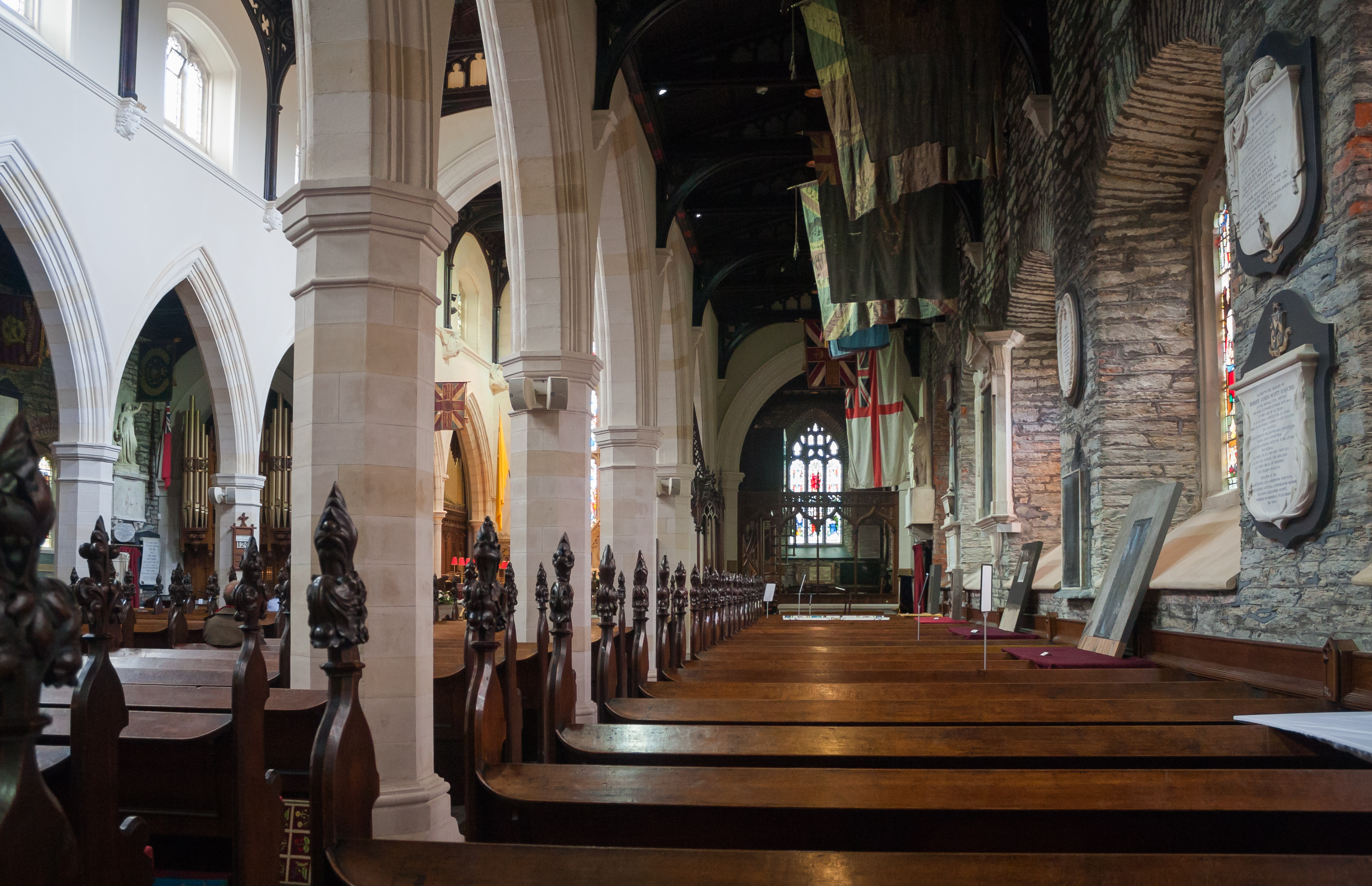
South aisle

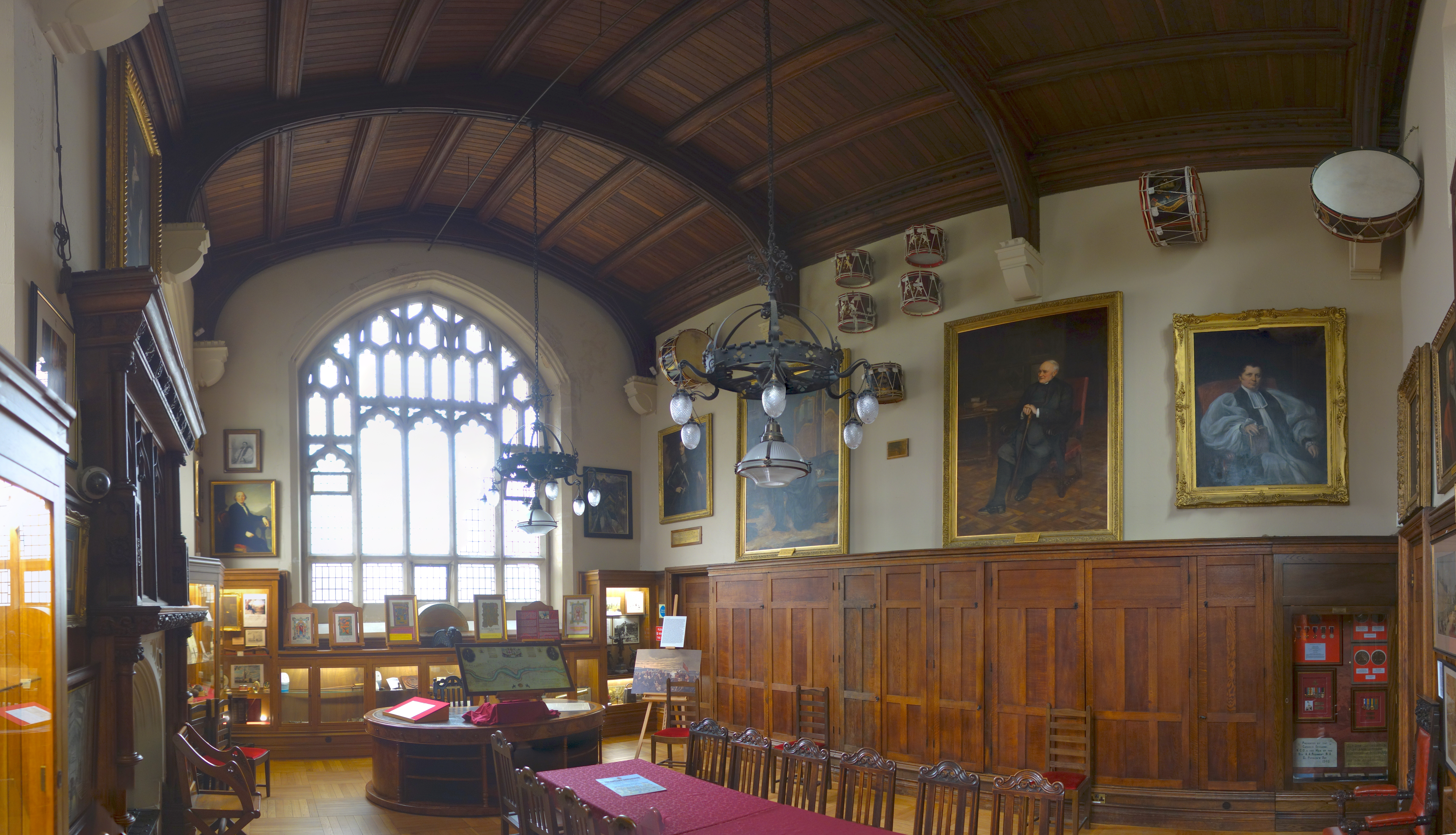
Chapter House interior

== See also ==
- St Eugene's Cathedral in the Roman Catholic Diocese of Derry
