= Roy Massey (organist) =

British organist and conductor (born 1934)

Roy Cyril Massey MBE (born 9 May 1934) is a British organist and conductor.

== Early life and education ==
Born in Birmingham, Massey was educated at Moseley Grammar School and the University of Birmingham, where he was awarded the degree of Bachelor of Music (BMus). He also holds the diplomas of FRCO(CHM) and the Archbishop's Diploma in Church Music (ADCM).

== Career ==
Massey served as organist of St Alban-the-Martyr, Bordesley (1953–1960), and of St Augustine's Church, Edgbaston (1960–1965), before becoming warden of the Royal School of Church Music and organist of Croydon Parish Church (1965–1968).

From 1968 to 1974 he was organist of St. Philip's Cathedral, Birmingham, and director of music at King Edward's School, Birmingham. He was elected Fellow of the Royal School of Church Music (FRSCM) in 1972 and Fellow of St. Michael's College, Tenbury, in 1975.

From 1974 to 2001 he was Organist and Master of the Choristers at Hereford Cathedral. During this time, he was conductor-in-chief of the Three Choirs Festival for nine seasons, for which he commissioned and conducted the premieres of several works by British composers.

== Later life ==
Following his retirement from Hereford Cathedral, Massey became President of the Royal College of Organists (2003–2005). He remained active as a concert organist, and gave the opening recital on the newly rebuilt organ at Hereford Cathedral in 2005.

He was awarded the Lambeth degree of Doctor of Music (DMus) in 1990 and appointed a Member of the Order of the British Empire (MBE) in 1997.

His arrangement of the Ukrainian melody 'Long the Night', was included in the carol anthology Noel!, published by Novello in 2000.

In 2021 Massey published his autobiography, An Organist Remembers: Memories of a Life in Cathedral Music.

Cultural offices
Preceded by Derek Holman	Organist and Director of Music, Croydon Parish Church; 1965-1968	Succeeded by Michael Fleming
Preceded by Thomas Tunnard	Organist and Master of the Choristers of St. Philip's Cathedral, Birmingham; 1968-1974	Succeeded by David Bruce-Payne
Preceded by Richard Lloyd	Organist and Master of the Choristers of Hereford Cathedral; 1974-2001	Succeeded by Geraint Bowen
