= Bishop Simms =

English organist and composer

- Born: 1767
- Died: 30 January, 1829 (aged 61–62)
- Occupations: Composer
- Instruments: Organ

Bishop Simms (1767 – 30 January 1829) was an English organist and composer.

== Background ==
He was born in 1767, the eldest son of John Simms of Staffordshire. Many of his siblings were also musicians in the Midlands.

He was appointed as organist of St Philip's Church, Birmingham in succession to Joseph Harris who was appointed to Worcester Cathedral. Bishop Simms was also organist of St. Mary's Chapel in Birmingham

He was a violinist, and one of the orchestra at the Birmingham Festivals from 1805.

In 1809 he gave the opening recital on the new Elliot organ in the Church of St John the Baptist, Bromsgrove. His brother, James Simms, was then the organist at this church for some 45 years.

He died in Birmingham in 1829, and his post at St Philip's Church, Birmingham was filled by his nephew.

== Appointments ==
- Organist of St. Mary's Chapel, Birmingham
- Organist of St Philip's Church, Birmingham 1803 - 1829

== Compositions ==
In 1810 he published an adaptation of Haydn's chorus, The Heavens are Telling, from his oratorio, The Creation.

Cultural offices
Preceded by Jeremiah Clarke	Organist and Master of the Choristers of St. Philip's Church, Birmingham; 1803-1829	Succeeded by Henry Simms
