= Ryde School with Upper Chine =

Ryde School

Location
- Queens Road; Ryde, Isle of Wight, PO33 3BE; United Kingdom

Information
- Type: Private school Co-educational school Day and boarding school
- Motto: Ut Prosim (Latin- "That I may be of service")
- Religious affiliation: Church of England
- Established: 1921
- Department for Education URN: 118223 Tables
- Headmaster (Senior): William Turner
- Gender: Co-educational
- Age: 2 to 18
- Houses: Chine, Hanover, Seaford, Trinity
- Colours: Navy Blue + Red + Gold
- Head (Prep): Matt Thomas
- Head (Nursery & Pre-Prep): Matt Thomas
- Fees (Senior School): £21,477 pa (tuition) £32,835 pa (tuition + board)
- Website: http://www.rydeschool.org.uk/

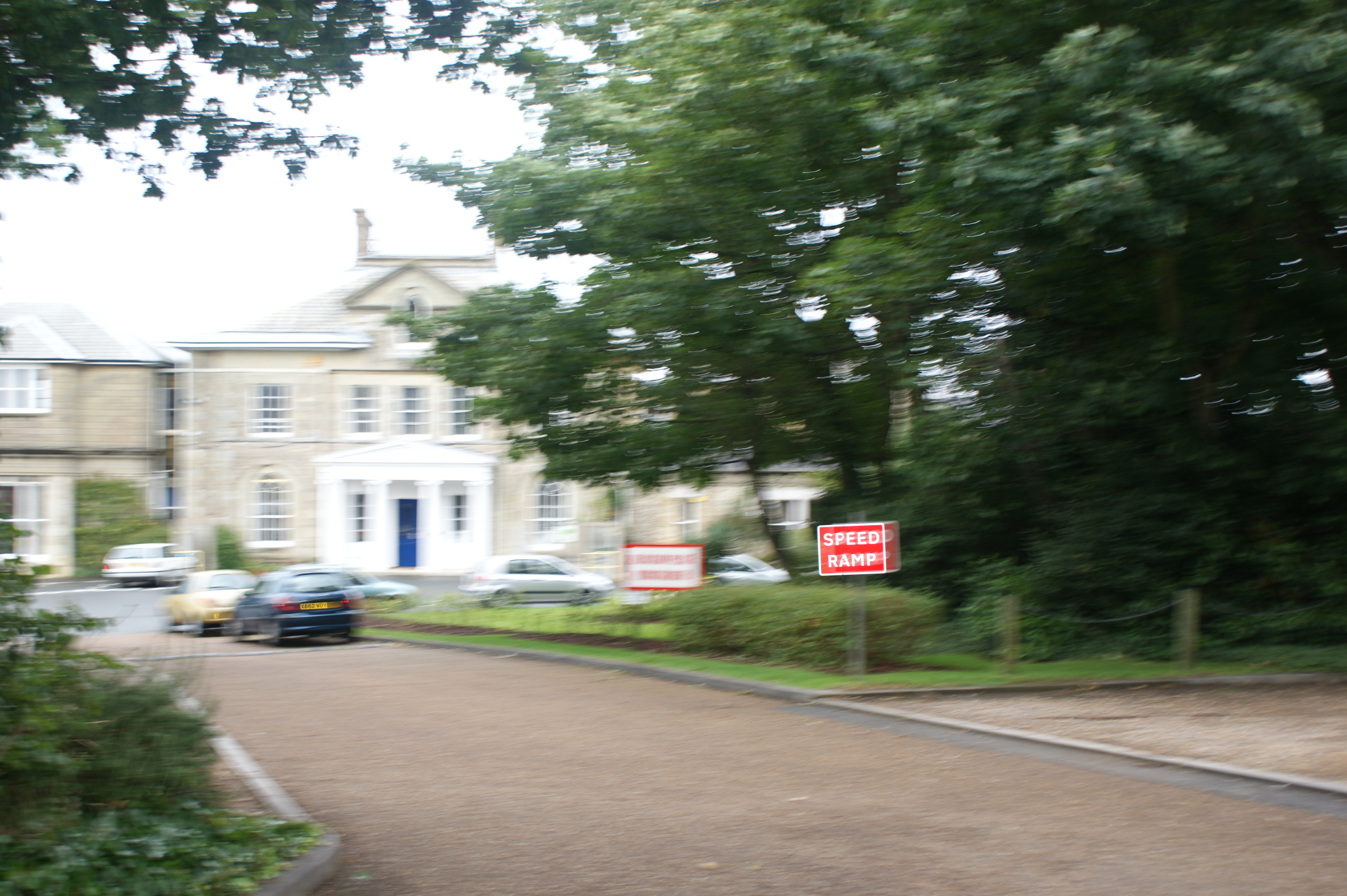
Westmont House c.2010.

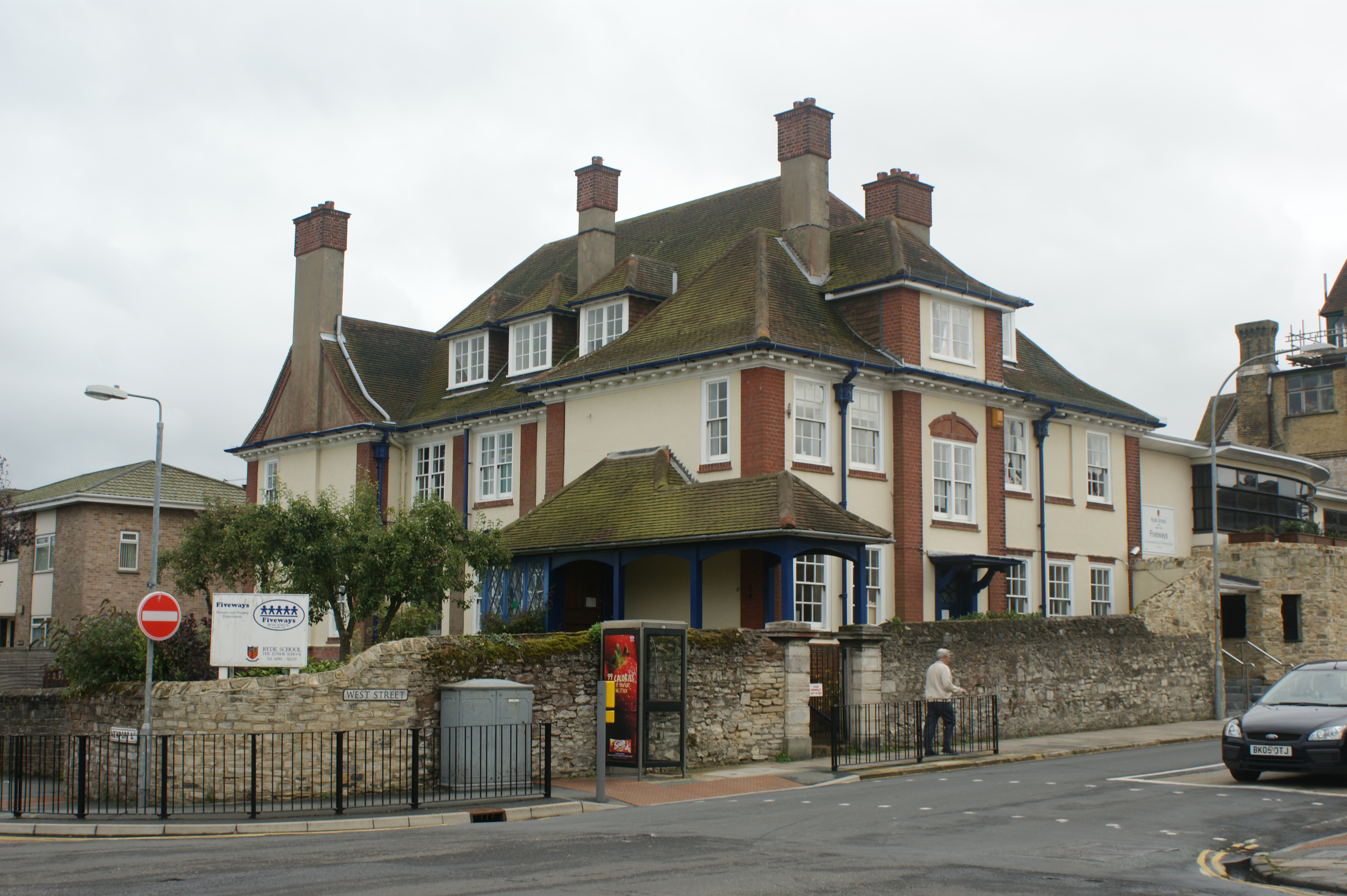
The Fiveways building of Ryde School.

Ryde School with Upper Chine (referred to as “Ryde School”) is a co-educational private boarding and day school in Ryde, on the Isle of Wight. The school, founded in 1921, is a member of the HMC (Headmasters’ and Mistresses’ Conference).

It is the Island's only boarding school, and is an amalgamation of three Island schools: Ryde School (whose name it retains), Bembridge School, and Upper Chine. All girls school Upper Chine merged with Ryde School in 1994.

Alumni are referred to as “Old Rydeians”. As of January 2023, fees for tuition and full boarding were £32,835.

== History ==
Ryde School was founded by William and Constance McIsaac as Ryde Grammar School on 25 April 1921. The school was opened by the mayor of Ryde with 46 day boys, who were put into three houses, Britons, Celts and Romans. William McIsaac is quoted as saying "boys would endeavour to be useful to God to whom they owed their existence and that they would use God's gifts for others first and themselves last."

Within a year, numbers increased to 78 and in 1923, the numbers further increased to 103 with the school divided into prep, junior and senior for ages 5 to 8, 8 to 11 and 11+ respectively.

In September 1972, the school's headmaster, Keith Symons, admitted the first girls into the sixth form.

In 1994, Upper Chine School for Girls, established in 1914, merged with the school, with the combined institution becoming known as Ryde School with Upper Chine. The new joined school gained a new logo, with the cornflower that was the symbol of Upper Chine School for Girls was incorporated into the old Ryde School badge. The Upper Chine Old Girls' Association continues to operate, as does The Old Rydeians' Association. In 1995, Ryde School took over Bembridge School and this became Bembridge Boarding Campus. In 2021 two new boarding houses were opened in the school grounds of Ryde: Millfield and Centenary House and now all boarding is on the school site in Ryde.

In 1999, a shield was dedicated to May Stacey, who worked on the domestic side of the school for 44 years with close association with the founding family and boarding, awarded annually to pupils in forms 1 to 5 for contributing most to doing good for others.

In summer 2002, Roy McIsaac, the son of the founders, headmaster from 1954 to 1966 and hereditary governor, died aged 82.

In November 2010, numbers had increased to 62 boarders and 703 day pupils, with Ofsted praising the school's accommodation, caring attitude of staff to boarders and was judged outstanding in helping children to be healthy, achieve well and enjoy what they do, make a positive contribution, protecting children from harm or neglect and helping them stay safe. They also rated "good" in achieving economic wellbeing.

On 16 September 2011, the school hosted BBC Radio 4 Any Questions live with chairman Jonathan Dimbleby and panellists Hilary Benn, Simon Heffer, Chris Huhne, Sally Hunt and Victoria Wakely.

In late 2012, Nicholas England was announced as a Deputy Lieutenant of the Isle of Wight for Queen Elizabeth II and his replacement following his retirement in the summer of 2013 was announced as Mark Waldron, the head of The English College in Prague.

Currently, the school operates as Fiveways for ages 2_{1/2} to 7 in West Street; the prep school for ages 8 to 11 and the senior school (and sixth form) for ages 11 to 18, both on the Westmont site.

The 2012 pass rates for the school were 96% 5+ A*-C including English and maths with 52% at A* to A for GCSE and 100% pass rate with 91% A* to C and 42% A* to A for A Level.

== Location ==
The school was originally located in Hanover House in George Street, Ryde, which also served as the home of headmaster William McIsaac, his wife, Constance and his son, Roy. Owing to increased numbers of pupils, extra buildings were purchased, as well as an extension to Hanover House, within a year of opening.

Boarders were introduced in 1922 and housed in Trinity House, Dover Street, where the family also moved to allow more classrooms in the original school building. In 1923, the school leased Seaford Lodge for a boarding house run by Constance McIsaac.

The school moved to its current location - less than a mile away from its original location - Westmont in Queen's Road, Ryde, in 1928. Westmont is a Grade II listed building, including the Victorian greenhouse and wall, Further buildings were purchased around the school since, including a number of houses on West Street, Oxford Lodge, bought in 1972, Hollymount, Hermitage and Highclere. A more recent extension houses a two-storey classroom block, sports hall and the junior school, which shares the main Westmont site with the senior school. The primary school, Fiveways, is on a separate site opposite the main campus.

The boarding campus is located at the site of Bembridge School. On the site, New House is classified as a listed building. Bembridge School Chapel, a Grade II Group Value listed building, is used by Kingswood. The listed building includes panelling, pews and an Edward Woore stained glass.

The school purchased 11 and 15 Queens Road and sought planning permission to demolish them in 2008 and 2009. A glass building was designed by Walters and Cohen including new teaching facilities for art, design and technology and ICT, a reception and a dining area and kitchens, relocated from Westmont, alongside alterations to existing buildings, including library and study facilities for the sixth form in Westmont and modern languages moving to art, design and technology, and changes to the site. After two refusals, the application was approved on appeal. The foundation stone for the building, named the Bembridge Building, was placed by Major General Martin White, Lord Lieutenant of the Isle of Wight on 17 November 2010. In Autumn 2011, the Earl of Wessex officially opened Bembridge Building and Wessex Quadrangle.

In 2015 Isle of Wight Council authorised Ryde School with Listed Building Consent and planning permission to alter 16/17 Lind Street in Ryde to provide a new boarding house for sixth formers, "Spinnaker House". In 2017, the school applied for planning permission to construct a new boarding house for 68 pupils on the main campus.

The school's current facilities include a shooting range (.22) used by the CCF (Combined Cadet Force), three sports pitches for rugby, football, cricket and hockey, a sports hall, gym and table tennis area. The school also has astroturf at Smallbrook Stadium.

In 2014, Independent Schools Inspectorate, ISI, inspected Ryde School With Upper Chine. As part of its report, it gave a positive write-up to Bembridge Boarding Campus with its friendly atmosphere and many opportunities for recreational activities.

In 2026, Ryde School moved their nursery, "Fiveways" from opposite All Saints Church to the old Oxford Lodge building, linked to the main school itself. Oxford lodge building was Ryde School's music department until early 2026, where it was closed and moved into the Prep school. Oxford lodge went under heavy renovations and was transformed into the new Fiveways in October 2026.

== Curriculum and extra-curriculum ==
The school fields teams for rugby, hockey, cricket, netball, tennis, golf and athletics, among others. Duke of Edinburgh's Award Bronze, Silver and Gold are also offered as are the Royal Navy and Airforce sections of the Combined Cadet Force (CCf). Sailing is a big part of Ryde with sailing on the curriculum in the Prep School and dinghy and keelboat sailing in the Senior School.

The music department is located in Oxford Lodge in West Street, Ryde. In 2020, pupil Thomas Luke won the BBC Young Musician Award (Keyboard).

== Awards ==
In 1978, the school was involved in the National Trust Isle of Wight Youth Group, volunteering at the restoration of The Needles Batteries, owned by the National Trust and were introduced to Prince Charles at the official opening of Needles Old Battery in 1982.

In 2002, the school won in all three categories at the Isle of Wight final for Rotary Youth Speaks Competition and the intermediates came second in the district final. They also won in 2000 at the national level.

== Notable former pupils ==
- Catherine Arnold – British diplomat
- Seb Clover - world's youngest successful single-handed cross-Atlantic sailor (until 2005)
- Guy Mankowski- author
- Philip Norman - author of Babycham Night and Beatles biographer
- Sarah Close - musician
- Nicholas Percy - athlete
- George Gribble - flying ace of the Second World War (1919–1941, 21 aged)

=== Upper Chine School (to 1994) ===
- Lucy Meacock - longstanding ITV Granada TV news presenter of ITV News Granada Reports (1988—)
- Jane Birkin - actress and singer (1946–2023)
