= David Bruce-Payne =

British organist (born 1945)

David Malcolm Bruce-Payne (born 8 August 1945) is an English cathedral organist. He served at St Philip's Cathedral, Birmingham. Born in Banbury, Oxfordshire. He was a chorister at King's College, Cambridge under Boris Ord and Sir David Willcocks.

He studied the organ at the Royal College of Music and became Assistant Organist at Westminster Abbey and Master of Music at Westminster Abbey Choir School in 1968.

In 1974, he was appointed Organist and Master of the Choristers at Birmingham Cathedral and Head of Music at King Edward's School, Birmingham. He later became a Senior Lecturer and teacher of organ at Birmingham Conservatoire until moving to Weymouth in 2003. He continues to be active as a conductor, organist, composer and teacher.

== Career ==
Organist of:

- St. Philip's Cathedral, Birmingham 1974–1977
- St. George's Church, Edgbaston 1977–2003

Cultural offices
Preceded by Roy Massey	Organist and Master of the Choristers of St. Philip's Cathedral, Birmingham; 1974-1977	Succeeded by Hubert Best
