= Rye Town Hall =

Rye Town Hall may refer to the following town halls:

- Rye Town Hall, East Sussex, England
- Rye Town Hall (New Hampshire), United States

== See also ==
- Ryde Town Hall, Isle of Wight, England
