= St George's Church, Edgbaston =

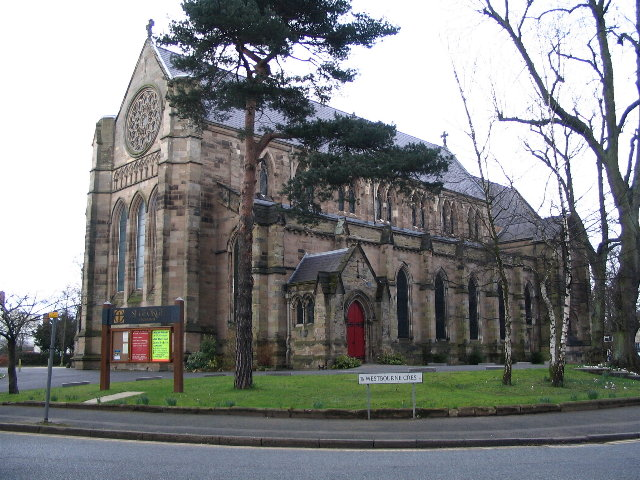
- St George's Church, Edgbaston
- 52°28′05″N 01°55′21″W
- Denomination: Church of England
- Churchmanship: Liberal Catholic
- Website: www.stgeorgesedgbaston.org.uk

History
- Dedication: St. George

Administration
- Province: Canterbury
- Diocese: Birmingham
- Parish: Edgbaston

Clergy
- Vicar: Fr. Sam Gibson

St George's Church, Edgbaston, is a parish church in the Church of England in Edgbaston, Birmingham.

== History ==
It was built in 1836–38 as a chapel-of-ease to St Bartholomew's Church, Edgbaston.

The original building consisted of a nave and two aisles, with galleries. The architect was Joseph John Scoles.

In 1856 the church was enlarged with the addition of a chancel, to a design by the architect Charles Edge.

The building was transformed in 1884-5 by the addition of the existing spacious and lofty nave, chancel and south aisle by the leading Birmingham architect J. A. Chatwin. The old nave became the north aisle, and the old chancel the Lady Chapel.

"Extensive alterations and restorations in the interior of the church" were carried out to the designs of architect Arthur Edwards of Birmingham in 1899. Edwards was also the churchwarden for St George's.

On 21 January 1970, it was made a Grade II listed building.

== Fittings ==
The interior has fine woodwork by Bridgeman of Lichfield to the design of J. A. Chatwin or P. B. Chatwin. This includes

- Clergy and choir stalls and parclose screen (1885)
- Organ case (1890)
- Reredos (1903)
- Lady Chapel screen (1906);

== Stained glass ==
There is late Victorian stained glass: by Burlison and Grylls, Heaton, Butler and Bayne, Hardman & Co. of Birmingham and most particularly a Jesse tree in the Lady Chapel by Charles Eamer Kempe.

== List of vicars ==
- Isaac Spooner 1837–1848
- Edward Lillingston 1848–1864
- George Lea 1864–1883
- Charles Mansfield Owen 1883–1903?
- Arthur William Thomson Perowne 1904-1913
- Edgar Basil Turbeville Farncombe
- William James Hughes 1951–1953

George Browning MC

- Arthur Lewis Burrell
- Donald John Walter Bradley 1971-1984
- Robert William Grimley 1984–1997
- Simon Thorburn 1997–2009
- Julian Francis 2011-2019
- Samuel Gibson 2020-

== Organ ==
The organ was built by Brindley & Foster in 1890 and is now defunct. A specification of the organ can be found on the National Pipe Organ Register.

=== List of organists ===
- Mr. Evans ???? - 1864 - 1865 - ???? (later organist of St Mary's Church, Selly Oak
- Charles John Blood Meacham 1888 – 1930 (formerly organist of St. Philips' Church, Birmingham)
- Leonard Norman Gibbons (formerly organist of St. Mary's Church, Selly Oak and deputy organist at St. Philip's Cathedral) 1930-1948
- David Bruce-Payne 1978 – 2003 (formerly organist of St. Philip's Cathedral, Birmingham)
- Philip Ypres Smith 2003 – present
