= Marcus Huxley =

English cathedral organist

Marcus Huxley (born 11 December 1949) is an English cathedral organist, who served in St. Philip's Cathedral, Birmingham between 1986 and 2017.

== Background ==
Marcus Richard Huxley was born in Chelmsford, Essex, England. He was educated at Pembroke College, Oxford, and was organ scholar at Worcester College, Oxford, from 1972 to 1974, and studied organ under Marie-Claire Alain

He was conductor of the Ilkley and Otley Choral Society from 1980 to 1984. He was Director of the York Early Music Choir from 1980 to 1986.

He won joint 2nd prize and Audience Prize at the Interpretation Competition at the St Albans International Organ Festival in 1977.

He was an organ tutor at Birmingham Conservatoire.

A CD featuring sacred choral works by Huxley, performed by the choir of St Philip's Cathedral, was released in 2010 on Regent Records. In addition to staples of the Anglican repertoire such as the Mass, the Magnificat and Nunc Dimittis, and a setting of the Passion according to St Luke, it is notable for featuring a full setting of the alternative form of Evening Prayer authorised in the year 2000 as part of the Common Worship series, using considerably more modern language than the 1662 Book of Common Prayer which forms the basis of traditional Evensong and Evening Prayer services.

== Career ==
Assistant Organist of :

- Ripon Cathedral 1974 - 1986

Organist of:

- St. Philip's Cathedral, Birmingham 1986 - 2017

Cultural offices
Preceded by Hubert Best	Organist and Master of the Choristers of St. Philip's Cathedral, Birmingham; 1986-2017	Succeeded by David Hardie
