= Henry Simms (organist) =

English organist and composer

Henry Simms (1804 – 1 May 1872) was an English organist and composer.

== Background ==
Henry Simms was born in 1804, the son of Jesse Simms. He studied pianoforte under Ignaz Moscheles.

He was chorus master for the Birmingham Choral Society from 1842, following in the place of the late George Hollins. He was famous as an extempore player, and widely known as a teacher of pianoforte and singing.

He had two sons, both of whom were also organists:

- Robert Henry Simms (1829-1856)
- Edward Bishop Simms (1833-1913)

He died on 1 May 1872.

== Appointments ==
- Organist of Holy Trinity Church, Bordesley 1825 - 1872
- Organist of St Philip's Church, Birmingham 1829 - 1871

== Compositions ==
His compositions were chiefly teaching pieces for pianoforte and songs; but he also wrote a Communion Service.

Cultural offices
| Preceded by Bishop Simms | Organist and Master of the Choristers of St. Philip's Church, Birmingham; 1829 - 1871 | Succeeded by Charles John Blood Meacham |
