= Hubert Best =

English cathedral organist

Hubert Best (born 1952) was an English cathedral organist, who served in St. Philip's Cathedral, Birmingham.

== Background ==
Hubert Best was born on 24 March 1952 in Durban, South Africa. He was educated at Rhodes University.

He studied organ at the Royal Academy of Music.

== Career ==
Assistant Organist of :

- St. Philip's Cathedral, Birmingham

Organist of:

- St. Philip's Cathedral, Birmingham 1978 - 1985
- Lutheran Church of the Redeemer, Jerusalem
- St. James' Church, Muswell Hill

Cultural offices
Preceded by David Bruce-Payne	Organist and Master of the Choristers of St. Philip's Cathedral, Birmingham; 1978-1985	Succeeded by Marcus Huxley
