= Charles John Blood Meacham =

English organist and composer

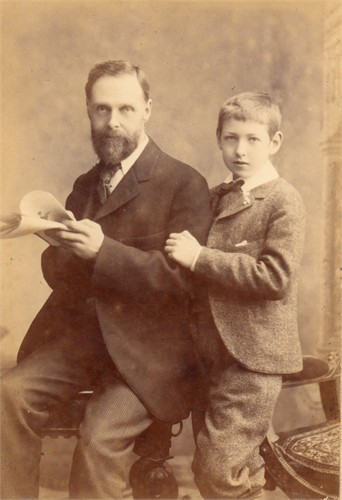
The organist Charles John Blood Meacham and his son John. Photograph from ca. 1890.

Charles John Blood Meacham (20 December 1850 – 16 January 1930) was an English organist and composer.

== Education ==
Charles John Blood Meacham, was born on 20 December 1850 and baptised on 2 February 1851. He was the son of John Meacham (1819–1887) and Elizabeth Blood (1814–1877). He was educated at St John’s College, Cambridge where he was awarded Mus.B. in 1871. He then trained at Ely Cathedral.

He married Eliza Melson on 28 August 1877 in Lapworth Parish Church. They had one son, Hugh St. Alban Meacham (1881–1967).

He died on 16 January 1930 in Edgbaston, Birmingham. A legacy from his estate was used to create The C J B Meacham Trust, which is now administered by the Diocese of Coventry. It provides credit to the Diocesan stipends fund.

== Appointments ==
- Organist of St Philips Church, Birmingham 1871–1888
- Organist of St George's Church, Edgbaston 1888–1930

== Compositions ==
He wrote

- Song: Oh lady, leave they silken thread 1878
- Song: Lead kindly light 1879
- Anthem: Come unto me 1883
- Benedictus and Agnus Dei 1886
- Song: England’s Glory 1889
- Solemn Processional March 1893.
- Andante Religioso 1894
- Anthem: It is a good thing to give thanks 1896
- Magnificat and Nunc Dimittis in F 1896
- Anthem: The Lord is my Shepherd

Cultural offices
Preceded by Henry Simms	Organist and Master of the Choristers of St. Philip's Church, Birmingham; 1871–1888	Succeeded by Richard Yates Mander
