= Frank Gillingham =

English cricketer (1875–1953)

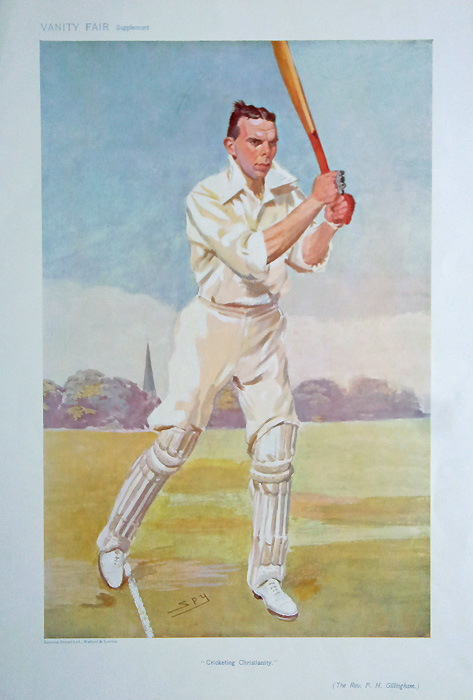

Personal information
- Full name: Frank Hay Gillingham
- Born: 6 September 1875; Tokyo, Japan
- Died: 1 April 1953 (aged 77); Monaco
- Batting: Right-handed
- Role: Wicket-keeper

Domestic team information
- Years: Team
- 1903–1928: Essex

Career statistics
Competition	FC
Matches	210
Runs scored	10050
Batting average	30.64
100s/50s	19/-
Top score	201
Balls bowled	8
Wickets	0
Bowling average
5 wickets in innings
10 wickets in match
Best bowling
Catches/stumpings	111/1
- Source: Cricinfo, 23 July 2013

Frank Hay Gillingham (6 September 1875 – 1 April 1953) was an English cricketer. He played for Essex between 1903 and 1928.

Born in Tokyo to John Rowley Gillingham and his wife Sarah (nee Archer), he was educated at Dulwich College and Durham University. He worked in the City of London for a while but, after training for ordination at the London College of Divinity, was ordained as a deacon in 1899 and priest in 1900 and became curate of Leyton (1899-1905). He later became an army chaplain with the 2nd Battalion, South Wales Borderers at Tidworth from 1905 to 1907 then again a curate at St James-the-Less, Bethnal Green, (1907-1910). He was then successively Vicar of Holy Trinity Church, Bordesley (1910-1914), Rector of St Mary Magdalen Bermondsey (1914-1923), Rector of St Margaret's, Lee (1923-1940). and Rector of St Stephen Walbrook (1940-1953). He was a Temporary Chaplain to the Forces during the First World War. He was a Chaplain to the Royal Household from 1940 to 1953.

As an amateur cricketer he was a member of the Essex XI who in 1905 beat the Australians at Leyton by 19 runs. He went on to tour Jamaica with the Hon. L H Tennyson's team in 1927. That year he also made the first ball-by-ball cricket commentary for the BBC, speaking for a total of 25 minutes over four sessions. He was reportedly fired by BBC chairman Lord Reith for reading advertisement placards out on air to fill time during a rain break.
