= St John the Baptist's Church, Leamington Spa =

Church in Warwickshire, England

Coordinates: 52°16′39.78″N 01°31′51.35″W

St John the Baptist's Church
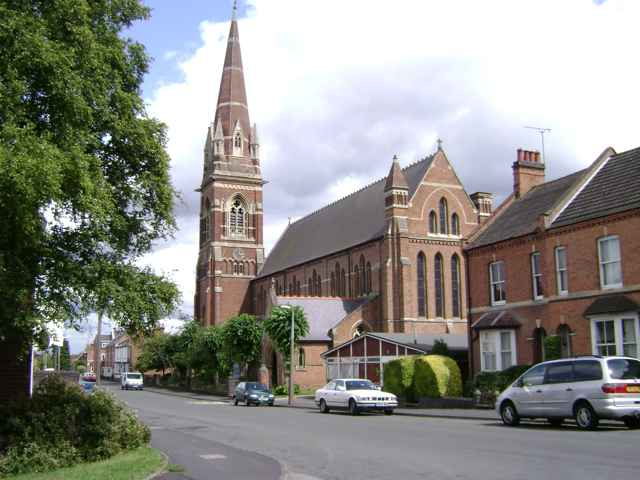
- St John the Baptist's Church
- Denomination: Church of England
- Churchmanship: Traditional Catholic
- Website: https://www.stjohnsleamingtonspa.org.uk/

History
- Dedication: Saint John the Baptist

Administration
- Province: Canterbury
- Diocese: Coventry
- Deanery: Leamington & Warwick
- Parish: Leamington Spa

Clergy
- Bishop: Rt Revd Paul Thomas SSC (AEO)
- Vicar: Fr Stephen Charles Parker SSC

Listed Building – Grade II*
- Official name: Church of St John the Baptist
- Designated: 25 March 1970
- Reference no.: 1381539

St John the Baptist's Church is an Anglo-Catholic parish church in Leamington Spa, England. The historic structure is Grade II* listed.

== History ==
The church of St John the Baptist was built between 1877 and 1878 to designs by the architect John Cundall of Leamington.

It was recently reroofed at a cost of £250,000 by Brown Matthews Architects.

It is a parish of the Society of St Wilfrid and St Hilda under the care of the Bishop of Oswestry.

== Organ ==
The church has a two-manual pipe organ built by Henry Jones which dates from 1878. A specification of the organ can be found on the National Pipe Organ Register.

=== Organists ===
- 1880–1888: Richard Yates Mander
