= George Gribble (RAF officer) =

British WWII flying ace (1919–1941)

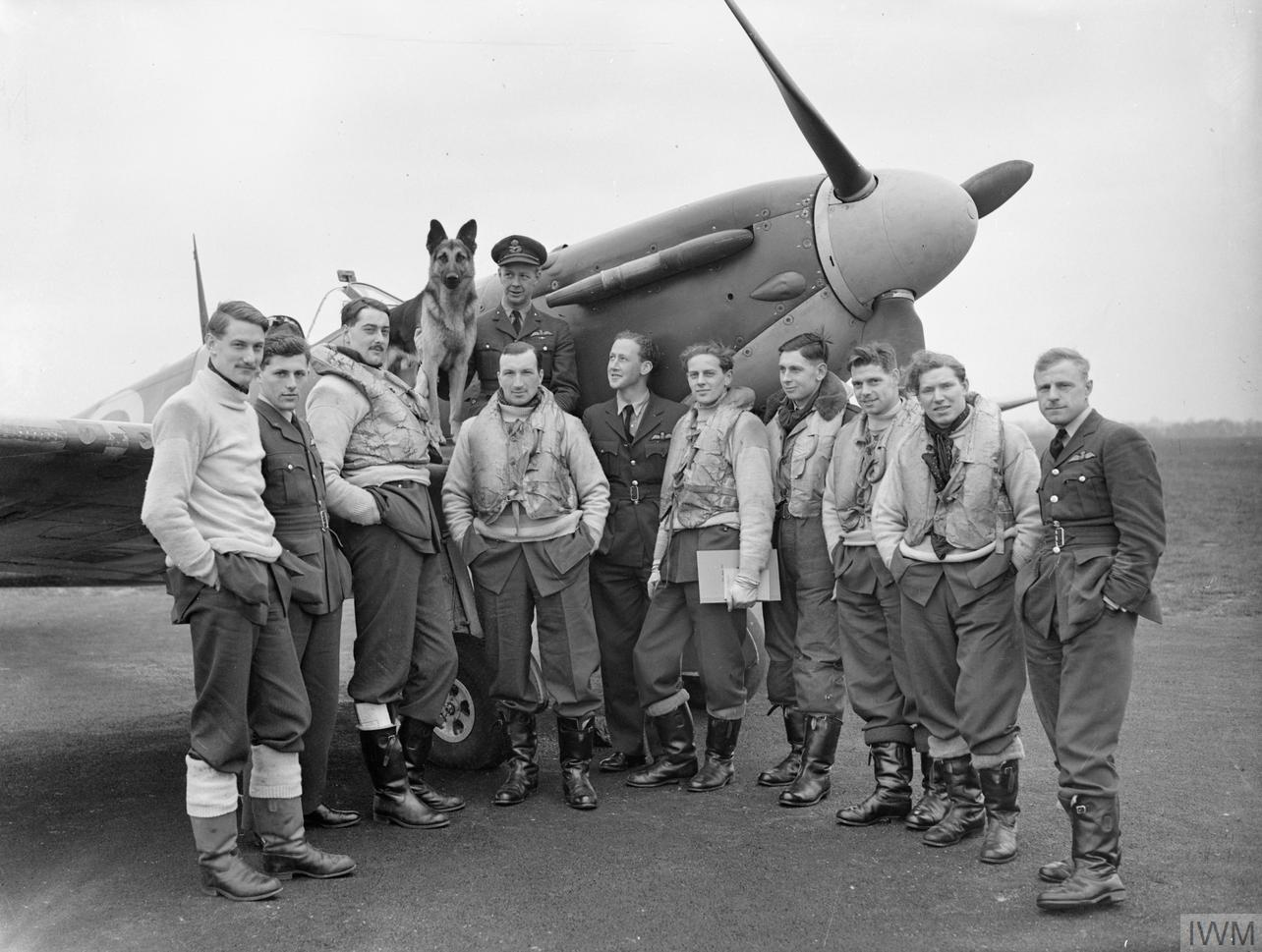
- Pilots of 54 Squadron gathered round a Supermarine Spitfire Mk IIa in May 1941; Gribble stands at the centre, looking upwards
- Born: Dorian George Gribble; 18 June 1919; Hendon, United Kingdom
- Died: 4 June 1941 (aged 21); Off the coast of England
- Military career
- Allegiance: United Kingdom
- Branch: Royal Air Force (1938–1941)
- Rank: Flight Lieutenant
- Unit: No. 54 Squadron
- Conflicts: Second World War: Battle of France; Battle of Britain; Channel Front (MIA)
- Awards: Distinguished Flying Cross

George Gribble, DFC (18 June 1919 – 4 June 1941) was a British flying ace of the Royal Air Force (RAF) during the Second World War. He was officially credited with the destruction of at least six German aircraft.

Born in Hendon, Gribble joined the RAF in 1938 and was posted to No. 54 Squadron. During the Second World War he flew Supermarine Spitfires extensively during the Battle of France and the subsequent Battle of Britain, shooting down a number of German aircraft. He was awarded the Distinguished Flying Cross in August 1940. The following year, he was promoted to flight lieutenant and flew several operations on the Channel Front. During a dogfight with German fighters on 4 June, his Spitfire was damaged and he bailed out over the English Channel. Despite search efforts he was never found.

== Early life ==
Dorian George Gribble, known as George Gribble, was born on 18 June 1919, the son of David Curle Gribble and his wife Gladys E. J. Gribble. Although his place of birth was Hendon, in the north of London, United Kingdom, he was raised on the Isle of Wight and was educated there, at Ryde School. In March 1938, he applied to join the Royal Air Force (RAF) on a short service commission. His application was successful and he was granted his RAF commission, initially as an acting pilot officer on probation, with effect from 7 May 1938. Proceeding to No. 11 Flying Training School at Shawbury, in December he was posted to No. 54 Squadron.

At the time of Gribble's arrival, No. 54 Squadron operated Gloster Gladiator fighters from the RAF base at Hornchurch. However in March the following year it began reequipping with the Supermarine Spitfire fighter. His acting rank was made permanent in March 1939.

== Second World War ==
Following the outbreak of the Second World War, No. 54 Squadron carried out patrols and the occasional interception mission but otherwise saw little action until May 1940, when the Germans invaded France and the Low Countries. It then began to fly sorties over France as the British Expeditionary Force (BEF) retreated to Dunkirk. Gribble's first flight to the Low Countries was on 16 May, patrolling over Ostend. On 24 May, when the squadron engaged a large group of Luftwaffe fighters near Calais, he shot down a Messerschmitt Bf 109 fighter. The next day, his Spitfire was damaged in another encounter in the area and he force landed near Dunkirk. He was able to return to the United Kingdom on a steamer. During Operation Dynamo, the evacuation of the BEF and French troops from Dunkirk, No. 54 Squadron flew patrols over the area. At the end of the month, the squadron shifted north to Catterick for a rest.

=== Battle of Britain ===
On 4 June, No. 54 Squadron returned to Hornchurch. It became fully engaged in the Battle of Britain the following month, regularly flying from Rochford and Manston in the southeast of England. On 25 July, Gribble claimed to have shot down two Bf 109s over North Foreland, although these were unconfirmed. Two days later the squadron returned to Catterick for another rest period. By this time Gribble was a flight commander. Another pilot in the squadron, Alan Deere, a New Zealand flying ace, described him as the "squadron joker".

No. 54 Squadron was back at Hornchurch by early August and resumed flying in the ongoing battle over Britain. On 13 August 1940, Gribble's award of a Distinguished Flying Cross (DFC) was announced; the citation, published in the London Gazette, read:

Since the outbreak of war, this young officer has taken part in most of the offensive patrols carried out by his squadron, including operations over the Low Countries and Dunkirk, and intensive air fighting over the Channel. Pilot Officer Gribble has led his section, and recently his flight, in a courageous and determined manner. On one offensive patrol, having expended his ammunition, he did not hesitate to lead two other pilots of his section, under severe cross-fire, in an attack against a formation of six Dornier 17's. As a result the effective bombing of an important convoy was prevented. This officer has personally destroyed three Messerschmitt 109's, and damaged many others.

— London Gazette, No. 34920, 13 August 1940

Two days after the announcement of his DFC, Gribble damaged a Junkers Ju 87 dive bomber, one of 30 that were intercepted over Dover by No. 54 Squadron. Later in the day he destroyed a Bf 109 and damaged a bomber, a Dornier Do 17, over Maidstone. He damaged another Bf 109 the next day. On 18 August he shot down a Bf 109, damaged a Messerschmitt Bf 110 heavy fighter and damaged two Heinkel He 111 bombers. In an engagement near Deal on 22 August, he claimed a Bf 109 as probably destroyed. Flying over Dover two days later, he encountered and damaged a Bf 110. In a subsequent patrol the same day, he destroyed a Bf 109, seeing it crash near Faversham in Kent. He shot down two Bf 109s on 28 August; the first was in the morning, part of the fighter escort for a group of Do 17s that was targeting the RAF airfield at Rochford. The second was in the afternoon, one of several Bf 109s and Bf 110s engaged by the squadron. On the last day of the month Hornchurch was bombed while the squadron was taking off on a sortie. Four aircraft were lost but with the assistance of his wingman, Gribble was able to shoot down a Bf 109 at low level.

The first few days of September proved to be busy, with a number of sorties being flown. Gribble claimed a Bf 109 as probably destroyed on 2 September and the following day was promoted to flying officer. The same day he went to Buckingham Palace, where he was presented with his DFC by King George VI. The squadron was shifted to Catterick shortly afterwards for a rest. Despite the move north, it was still called upon for interception missions, and on 27 October, Gribble was credited with damaging a Junkers Ju 88 bomber. He damaged another bomber, a He 111, to the southeast of Catterick on 6 November.

=== Channel Front ===
No. 54 Squadron was transferred back to Hornchurch in February 1941. Now equipped with the updated Spitfire Mk IIa, it regularly flew across the English Channel to the Low Countries, carrying out offensive sweeps and escorting bombers. On 4 June, and by this time a flight lieutenant, he was leading a section of Spitfires that were escorting bombers when they encountered a pair of Bf 109s. Attempting to engage these, he in turn was intercepted by other Luftwaffe fighters and the engine of his Spitfire was apparently damaged. He bailed out and came down in the sea, about 12 miles (19 km) from the English coast. Despite a search by Air and Sea Rescue vessels he was unable to be found and was presumed to have died.

At the time of his presumed death, Gribble was the last pilot still flying with No. 54 Squadron who had been part of its pre-war establishment. He had the sole credit for destroying six German aircraft, with a share in another aircraft shot down. He had two unconfirmed aerial victories, plus two probably destroyed. He also was credited with damaging at least nine enemy aircraft. He has no known grave and is commemorated on the Runneymeade Memorial.

His medals which, in addition to the DFC, included the 1939–45 Star with Battle of Britain Clasp, the Air Crew Europe Star, and the War Medal 1939–1945, came up for auction in September 2007. They sold for £35,000. The medals are presently owned by Lord Michael Ashcroft.
