= Holy Trinity Church, Bordesley =

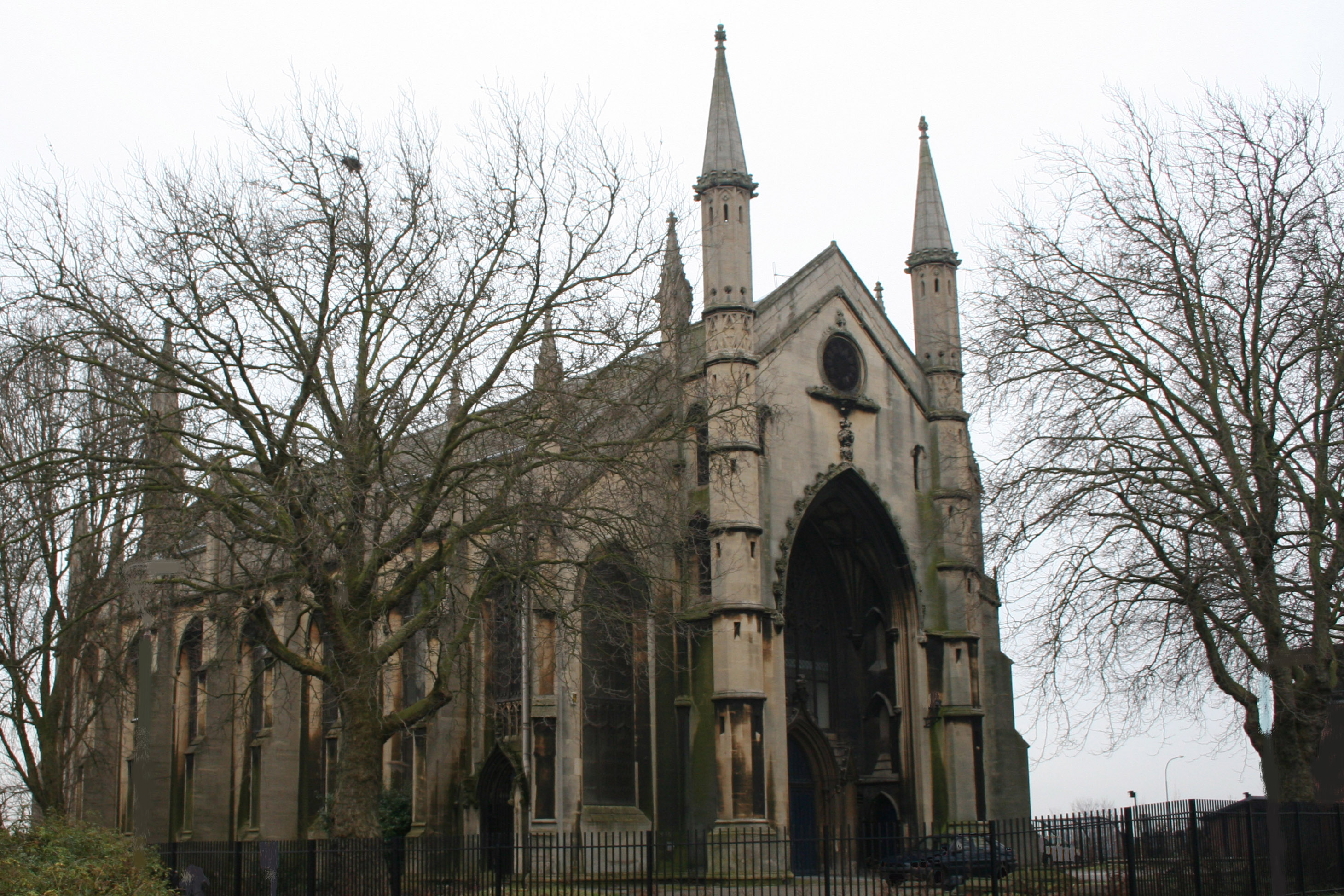
- Holy Trinity Church, Bordesley
- Holy Trinity Church, Bordesley
- 52.4705°N 1.8776°W
- OS grid reference: SP 08413 85848
- Location: Birmingham
- Country: England
- Denomination: Church of England

Architecture
- Architect: Francis Goodwin
- Groundbreaking: 1820
- Completed: 1822
- Construction cost: £14,235
- Closed: 1971

Specifications
- Capacity: 1821 persons
- Length: 135.5 feet (41.3 m)
- Width: 75.8 feet (23.1 m)
- Height: 45 feet (14 m)

Administration
- Diocese: Anglican Diocese of Birmingham

Holy Trinity Church, Bordesley is a Grade II listed former Church of England parish church at Camp Hill, Bordesley, Birmingham, England.

== History ==
An example of a Commissioners' church the church was built between 1820 and 1822 by the architect Francis Goodwin in the gothic revival style at an expense of £14,235, raised by subscription of the inhabitants, aided by a grant from the Parliamentary Commissioners. The church, said to have been modelled on King's College Chapel, Cambridge, was consecrated on 23 January 1823 by James Cornwallis the Bishop of Lichfield and Coventry. A parish was assigned out of St. Peter and St. Paul, Aston, the living, being a perpetual curacy in the gift of the Vicar of Aston, was called a vicarage from 1872; the patronage of which was transferred to the Aston Trustees in 1884. St Alban the Martyr, Birmingham Bordesley (Conybere St, originated as a building in Leopold Street, which was licensed as a mission of Holy Trinity, Bordesley, in 1865.

This former church has an exceptionally good interior with all its fittings and galleries. It has a rectangular plan with shallow canted apse, faced in Bath stone. The exterior is enlivened by pinnacled buttresses dividing the windows and octagonal pinnacled turrets holding the corners whilst a larger pair flank the recessed full height entrance arch under the parapeted gable. The soffit has a lierne pattern of ribs over the large decorated west window, with tracery of cast iron. The porch proper is shallow and contained within the recess, a tripartite composition with an ogee arch to the central doorway with an ornate finial. This composition was characteristic of Goodwin and may have been inspired by the 13th century front of Peterborough Cathedral. The east end above the apse and a cast iron tracery rose. The coved ceiling still partially remains but the decoration of a high standard for the period, has been stripped and a floor inserted.

Holy Trinity was also important in reflecting the High Church movement of the Anglican Church at the time. The first vicar was succeeded by Rev Dr Joseph Oldknow who was Birmingham's first Ritualist priest. Oldknow was buried here and the Latin inscriptions which can be seen on the gravestones gives a clue to the church's Anglo-Catholic history. He in turn was succeeded in 1874 by Richard William Enraght who was imprisoned in 1880 when the church became the centre of a battle over high church practices. Enraght was prosecuted in 1880 in a trial which was known nationally as the Bordesley Wafer Case.

Enraght was an Anglo-Catholic who burnt candles and incense, used wafers at the Eucharist, wore a chasuble and alb and mixed water with the communion wine. In addition, he did such things as making the sign of the cross towards the congregation. These were not the normal practices of the Church of England at the time and he fell foul of the radical Protestant reaction against ‘ritualism’. He was put on trial in 1879: a trial he refused to attend. He was convicted under the Public Worship Regulation Act 1874, a new law pushed through the Commons by influential Evangelicals in a bid to put an end to ‘Romish’ practices in the church, and finally imprisoned at Warwick. He was released after 49 days and a considerable national uproar, but his career never recovered.

Enraght's licence was eventually revoked and he was replaced in 1883 by the Rev Alan H Watts, against the wishes of the congregation and an account of their displeasure was reported in London Evening News for 12 March 1883. "A scene of an extraordinary nature was witnessed at Holy Trinity Church, Bordesley, Birmingham, yesterday morning, owing to the attempt of the Rev. A. H. Watts, who has been appointed vicar in place of the Rev. R. W. Enraght, to read himself in. The church was crowded, and there was a large number of police present. Just before the service the two churchwardens went to the vestry, being loudly applauded on their way thither. They were met by the vicar, who offered his hand, but it was declined, and the churchwardens handed him a formal protest to his assuming office. When Mr. Watts entered the church there were loud groans, and this was repeated on his reading the first lesson. When he commenced to read himself in there was great turmoil, and the efforts of the police to restore order were futile. The rev. gentleman, however, continued to the end, notwithstanding that his voice was almost inaudible. At the conclusion of the service an angry mob followed Mr. Watts until he entered a cab and drove away. In the evening the church was packed in every part, and the new vicar was slightly hissed as he entered the chancel from the vestry. He preached a sermon, but contrary to anticipation there was no disorder. When he left the church he was soon met by a large and noisy crowd, but no strong force, and the Rev. Gentleman was not molested."

The burial ground was closed in 1873 although family graves continued to be used until 1925. Some remains were removed due to the widening of Sandy Lane/ Bordesley Middleway; and many gravestones were removed after the church was deconsecrated in the late 1960s.

In autumn 1875 a group of cricketers from the church formed an Association football team, Small Heath Alliance, which became Birmingham City F.C.

The church was closed in 1968. It was initially proposed to be converted to an arts centre. but this did not come to fruition and, instead, for some years it was used as a shelter for homeless people until c 1999. It currently remains empty. In the late 1970s there were proposals for demolition. However, these were not implemented. In 2014 it was marketed for a residential conversion.

== Vicars ==
- Samuel Crane, 1823–41
- Joseph Oldknow, 1841–74
- Richard William Enraght, 1874–83
- Alan Hunter Watts, 1883–87
- Henry Sutton, 1887-95
- G.C. Williamson, 1897-1902
- Frank Trevelyan Snow, 1904-10
- Frank Hay Gillingham, 1910–14, Essex county cricketer
- Stephen Harold Wingfield-Digby, 1914-16
- Frederick Arthur Redwood ?-1926
- Norman Campbell Orr, 1926-36
- James France Hinett, 1936-41
- Edgar Francis Andrew Morgan, 1941-50
- Henry Raveley Guest MC, 1951–61. Guest disappeared in 1961, abandoning his car on cliffs in Anglesey.

== Organ ==
The organ in the church was built by Banfield in 1847. There were several modifications over the years. A specification of the organ from towards the end of its life can be found on the National Pipe Organ Register. The Register states that the organ was removed, but does not give any more details.

=== Organist ===
- Henry Simms 1825 – 1872
- Mr. A. Tricker, F.C.O. 1883
- Dr William Thomas Belcher 1884 – 1905 (formerly organist at St Mary's Church, Handsworth)
