= Richard Yates Mander =

English organist and composer

Dr. Richard Yates Mander FRCO LRAM (1862 - 31 March 1917) was an English organist and composer.

== Education ==
He was born in 1862 in Leamington Spa, son of Richard Mander and Esther Evans. His father was a band master.

In 1879 he passed the senior examination of Trinity College of Music, when it was held in Leamington Spa. He was awarded his ARCO in 1883 and his FRCO some time later. He graduated B.Mus (1896) and D.Mus (1902) at Queen's College, Oxford.

In September 1885, he married Elizabeth Catherine Taylor. The children from this marriage were:

- Richard Noel Mander, b. 1886
- Ester Maud Mander, b. 1887
- Catherine Mary Mander, b. 1889
- Lucy Evelyn Mander, b. 1891

He died in Ryde, Isle of Wight, on 31 March 1917 and is buried in Ashey Cemetery.

== Appointments ==
- Organist and choir master of St. John’s Church, Leamington Spa 1880 – 1888
- Organist of the St Philips Church, Birmingham 1888 - 1898
- Organist of All Saints' Church, Ryde 1898 - 1917
- He also served as music master of the College of the Blind, Worcester, and of the Royal Naval College at Osborne, Isle of Wight.
- He was teacher and organist of the Birmingham and Midland Institute of Music (1892-95) and organist to Ryde Corporation (from 1899).

== Compositions ==
- A Harvest Anthem, Thou Shalt Shew Us Wonderful Things.
- "Glory to Thee, my God, this night" (submitted as his B.Mus exercise).

Cultural offices
Preceded by Charles John Blood Meacham	Organist and Master of the Choristers of St. Philip's Church, Birmingham; 1888-1898	Succeeded by A. G. Thompson
