= Ryde =

Town on the Isle of Wight, England

Coordinates: 50.7271°N 1.1618°W

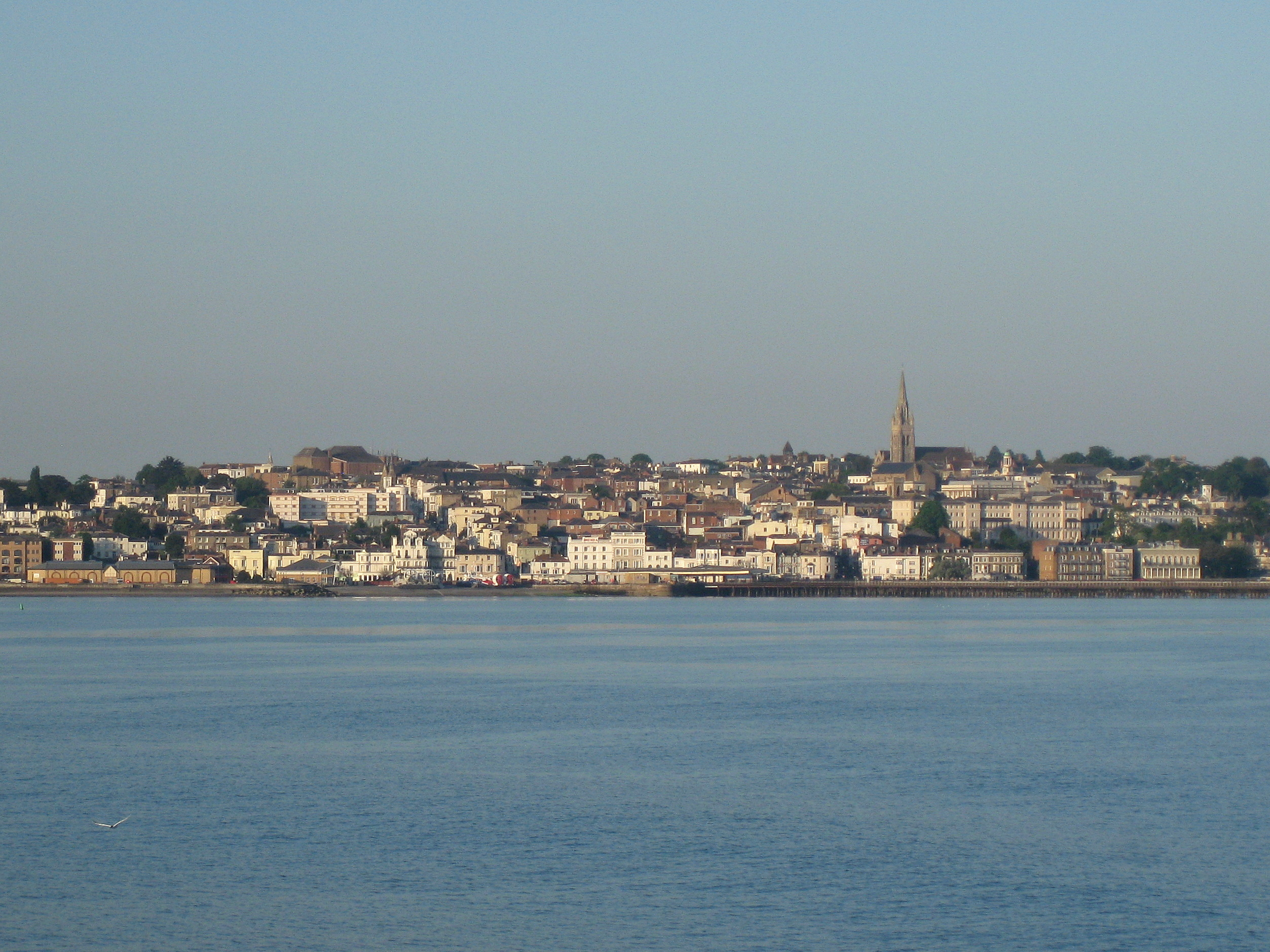
- Ryde viewed from the Solent

- Location within the Isle of Wight
- Population: 24,096 (2021 Census)
- OS grid reference: SZ591923
- Civil parish: Ryde
- Unitary authority: Isle of Wight Council
- Ceremonial county: Isle of Wight
- Region: South East
- Country: England
- Sovereign state: United Kingdom
- Post town: RYDE
- Postcode district: PO33
- Dialling code: 01983
- Police: Hampshire and Isle of Wight
- Fire: Hampshire and Isle of Wight
- Ambulance: Isle of Wight
- UK Parliament: Isle of Wight East

Ryde is a seaside town and civil parish on the north-east coast of the Isle of Wight, England. The parish area had a population of 24,096 according to the 2021 Census. Its growth as a seaside resort came after the villages of Upper Ryde and Lower Ryde were merged in the 19th century, as can still be seen in the town's central and seafront architecture. The resort's expansive sands are revealed at low tide. Their width means the regular ferry service to the mainland requires a long listed pier – the fourth longest in the United Kingdom, and the oldest surviving.

== Name ==
The name Ryde derives from the Old English rīð meaning '(the place at) a small stream'.

1257: la Ride

1265: Ride

1274: la Ryde

1420: Ryde

== History ==
The first mentions of Ryde were in 1300 as a fishing village along the coast.

In 1377, most of it was burnt down and destroyed during the French invasion.

Ryde was separated into Upper Ryde, a farming hamlet, and Lower Ryde. They were linked by a road or track, roughly where St Thomas's Street is.

On 20 July 1545 the Mary Rose sank at the Spithead.

In 1656, Upper and Lower Ryde had a population of around 220.

In 1782 numerous bodies of men, women and children from HMS Royal George, which sank suddenly at Spithead, were washed ashore at Ryde. Many were buried on land that is now occupied by the Esplanade. A memorial to them was erected in June 2004.

In 1811, the population of Ryde was 1,601.

There are a series of Regency and Victorian buildings in the town with important buildings such as All Saints' Church, designed by the eminent George Gilbert Scott, and Ryde Town Hall, which was completed in 1831. Up until the pier was opened in 1814, ferry passengers landing at low tide were brought almost half a mile into the shore by horse and cart.

In 1821, the population was 2,363.

In 1841, its population was 5,840.

Ryde was bombed many times during World War II.

== Governance ==
Ryde's motto is 'amoenitas salubritas urbanitas'.

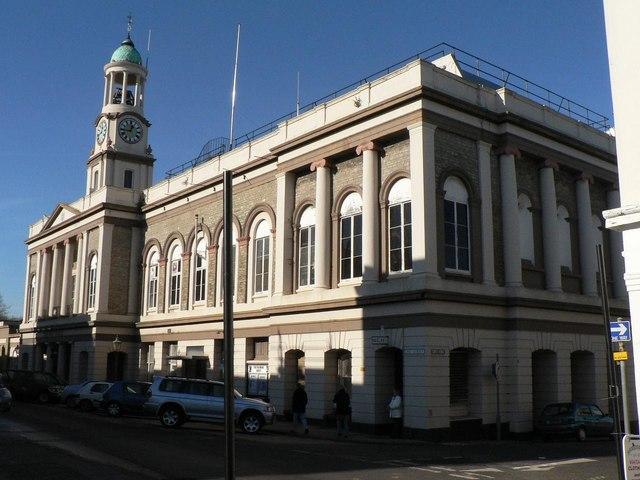
Ryde Town Hall

Ryde Town Council represents the residents of Ryde. Ryde Town Council is a statutory consultee in planning matters regarding Ryde. Their views are taken into account by the local planning authority, Isle of Wight Council.

Ryde residents are represented by Ward Councillors on the Isle of Wight Council.

In 1868 Ryde became a municipal borough which became part of the administrative county of Hampshire in 1889 and became part of the administrative county of the Isle of Wight in 1890 while still part of the ceremonial county of Hampshire. After 1894 the district contained only the parish of Ryde. In 1933 the urban district of St Helens was abolished and merged with Ryde, with the district also expanded by including part of the Isle of Wight Rural District.

On 1 April 1974 the district and parish were abolished and became part of Medina non-metropolitan district in the non-metropolitan and ceremonial county of the Isle of Wight. No successor parish was formed so it became unparished. In 1985 the parish of St Helens was formed from part of the unparished area; on 1 April 1989 Seaview was formed from part of the unparished area and renamed to "Nettlestone and Seaview" on 11 May 1989.

In 1995 Medina district was merged with South Wight and Ryde became part of the Isle of Wight unitary authority area. In 2006 the parishes of Fishbourne and Havenstreet and Ashey were formed from part of the unparished area; in 2008 the rest of the unparished area was parished as Ryde.

== Transport ==
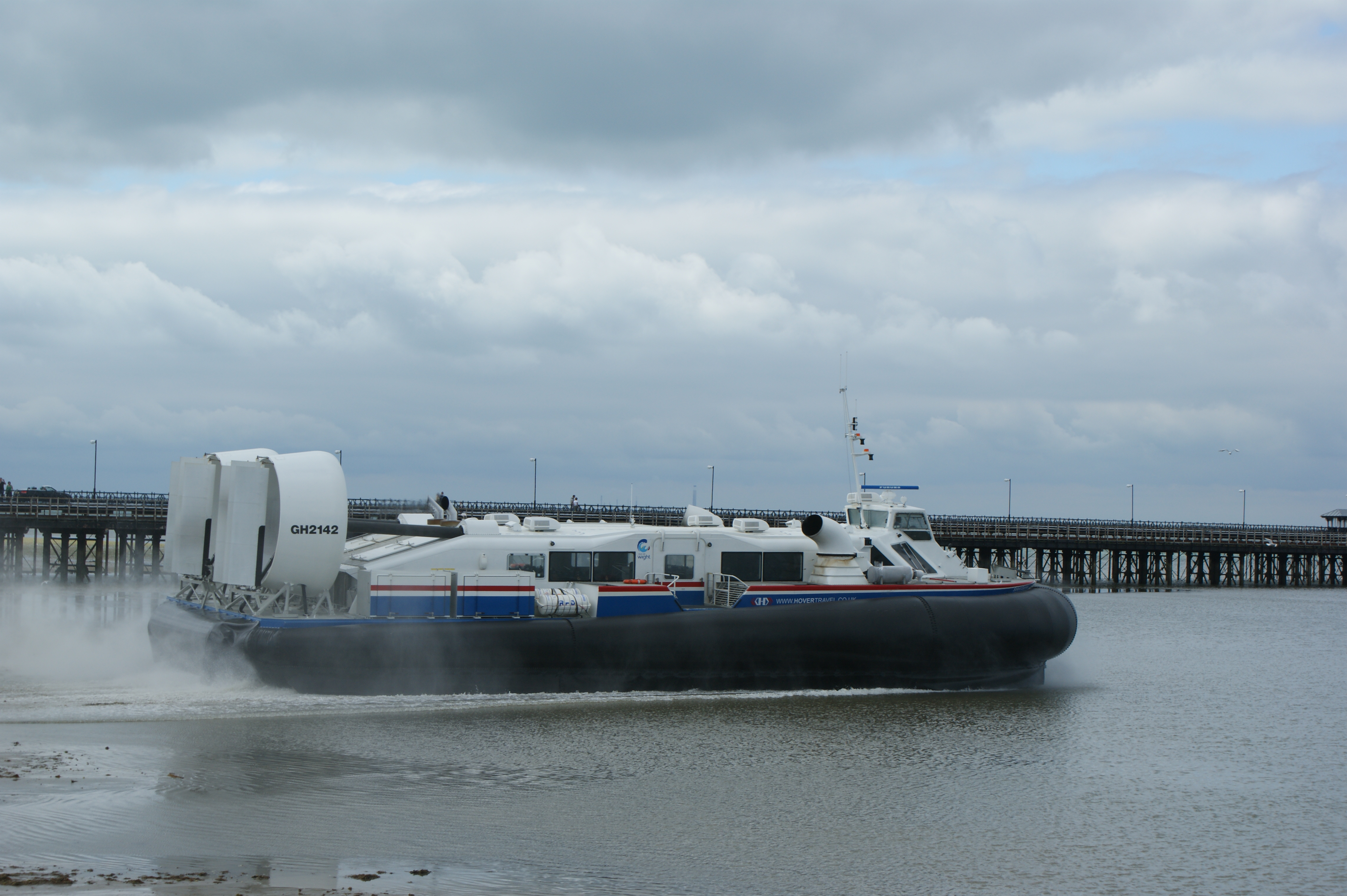
Hovercraft leaving Ryde

There is a hovercraft service to Southsea, which takes nine minutes. It is operated by Hovertravel near the Esplanade close to Ryde Esplanade railway station and the bus station. A catamaran service run by Wightlink operates from Ryde Pier to Portsmouth Harbour, which connects with both Island Line trains and mainland trains to London Waterloo.

The Island Line Trains service runs from Ryde Pier Head via Ryde Esplanade to Shanklin, a distance of 8.5 miles (14 km). Ryde St John's Road railway station lies further south in the town.

The bus interchange lies between Ryde Pier and the Hover Terminal on the Esplanade. Ryde is the second busiest stop in the Southern Vectis network after Newport. The busiest route is No. 9 to Newport, running every 10 minutes in the daytime. Other bus services include Nos. 2, 3, 4 and 8 and local route 37. Night buses run on some services on Fridays and Saturdays. Destinations served include Bembridge, Brading, Godshill, Sandown, Shanklin, and Ventnor. An open-top bus service, The Downs Breezer, runs in the summer. Another summer-only service is the Island Coaster, which connects Ryde with the main communities on the eastern and southern coasts and a variety of tourist attractions, including Blackgang Chine, Isle of Wight Pearl, and Alum Bay.

== Amenities ==
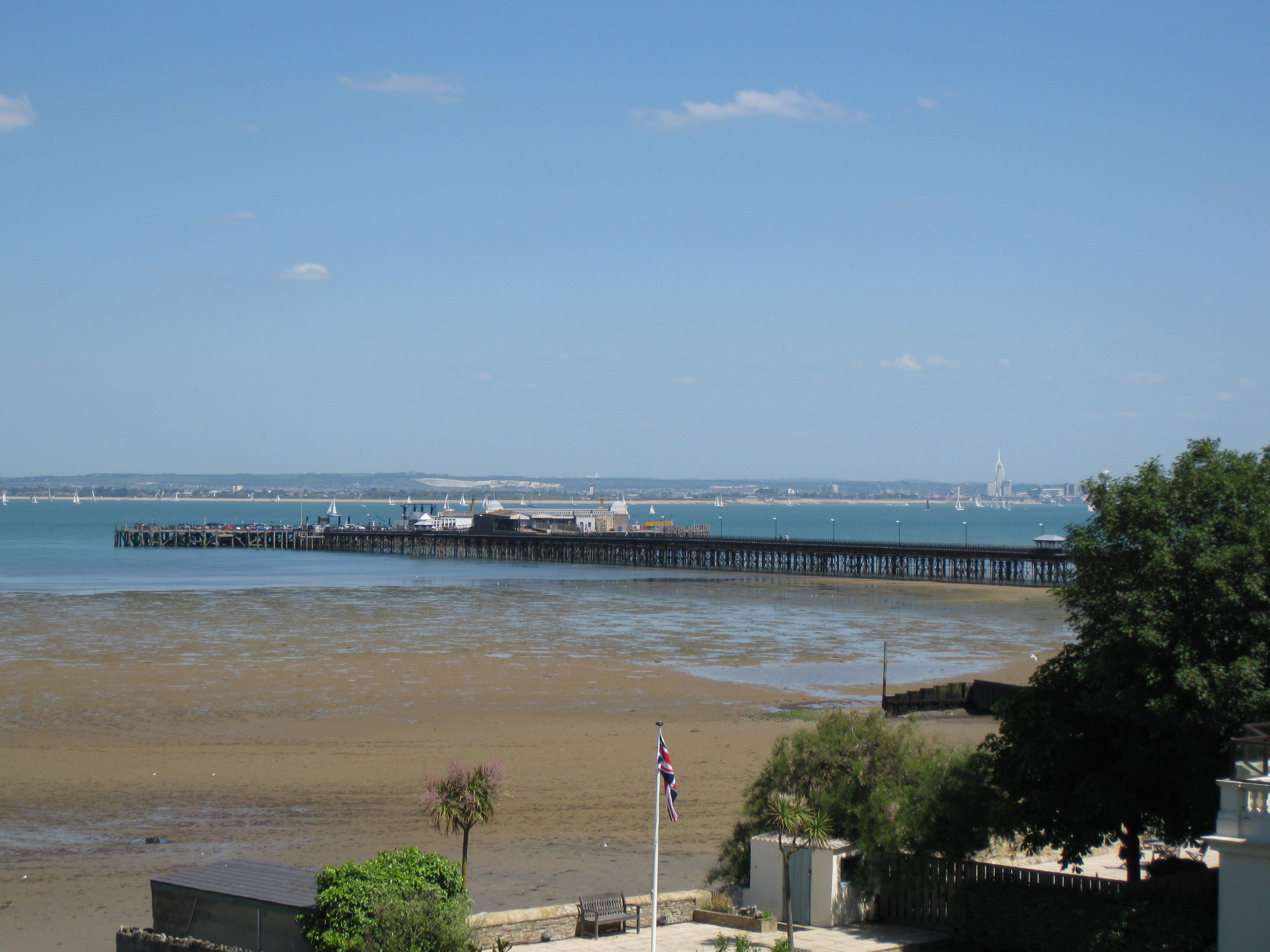
Ryde Pier seen from Ryde

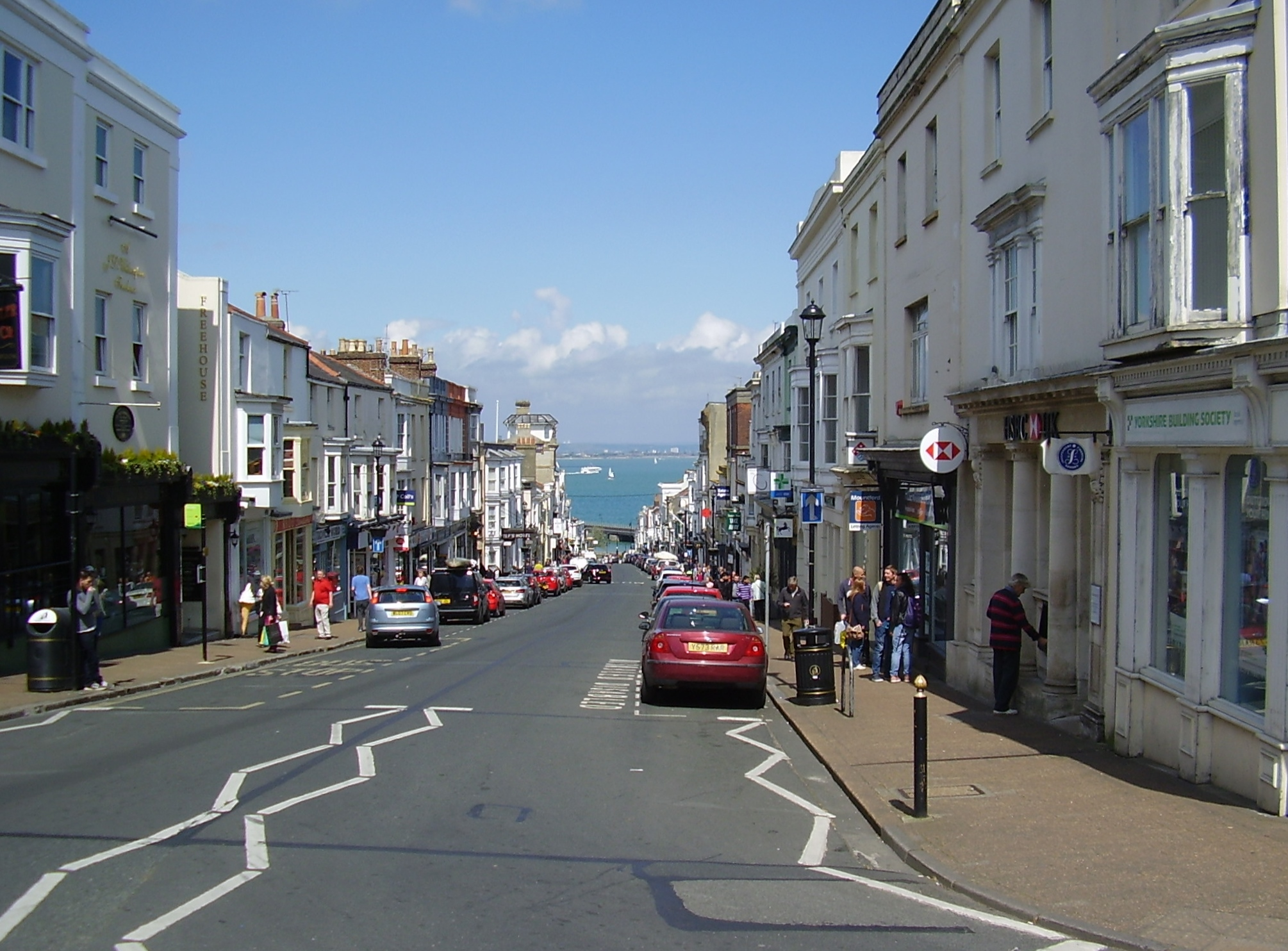
Union St

The town's large and long esplanade area has always been an attraction for tourists, especially those day-tripping from the mainland, as the amenities are all available by walking from the pier. A swimming pool, bowls club, bowling alley, and boating lake are among the attractions, and there are various children's playgrounds, amusement arcades and cafés.

Ryde has few large public open spaces beyond the esplanade, but areas for public recreation include Appley Park, Puckpool Park, Vernon Square, Simeon Street Recreation Ground, St John's Park, St Thomas' churchyard, Salter Road recreation ground, and Oakfield Football Club.

At one time Ryde had two separate piers; the other being the Victoria Pier, no longer in existence. Ryde has its own inshore rescue service, which mostly deals with people stranded on sandbanks as the incoming tide cuts them off from the shore. The pier is also a feature on the 67-mile (108 km) Isle of Wight Coastal Path, which is marked with blue signs bearing a white seagull.

Ryde has a small marina located to the east of Ryde Pier. It is tidal and dries out at low water, hence it is more suitable for smaller sailing (bilge keel) and motor cruisers. It has provision for up to 200 boats, either on floating pontoons or leaning against the harbour wall. It has a full-time harbour master, who posts information outside the harbour office, including weather reports, tide times, cruise-liner movements and anniversary events.

The town centre is on a hill, with local shops and chain retailers.

== Buildings ==
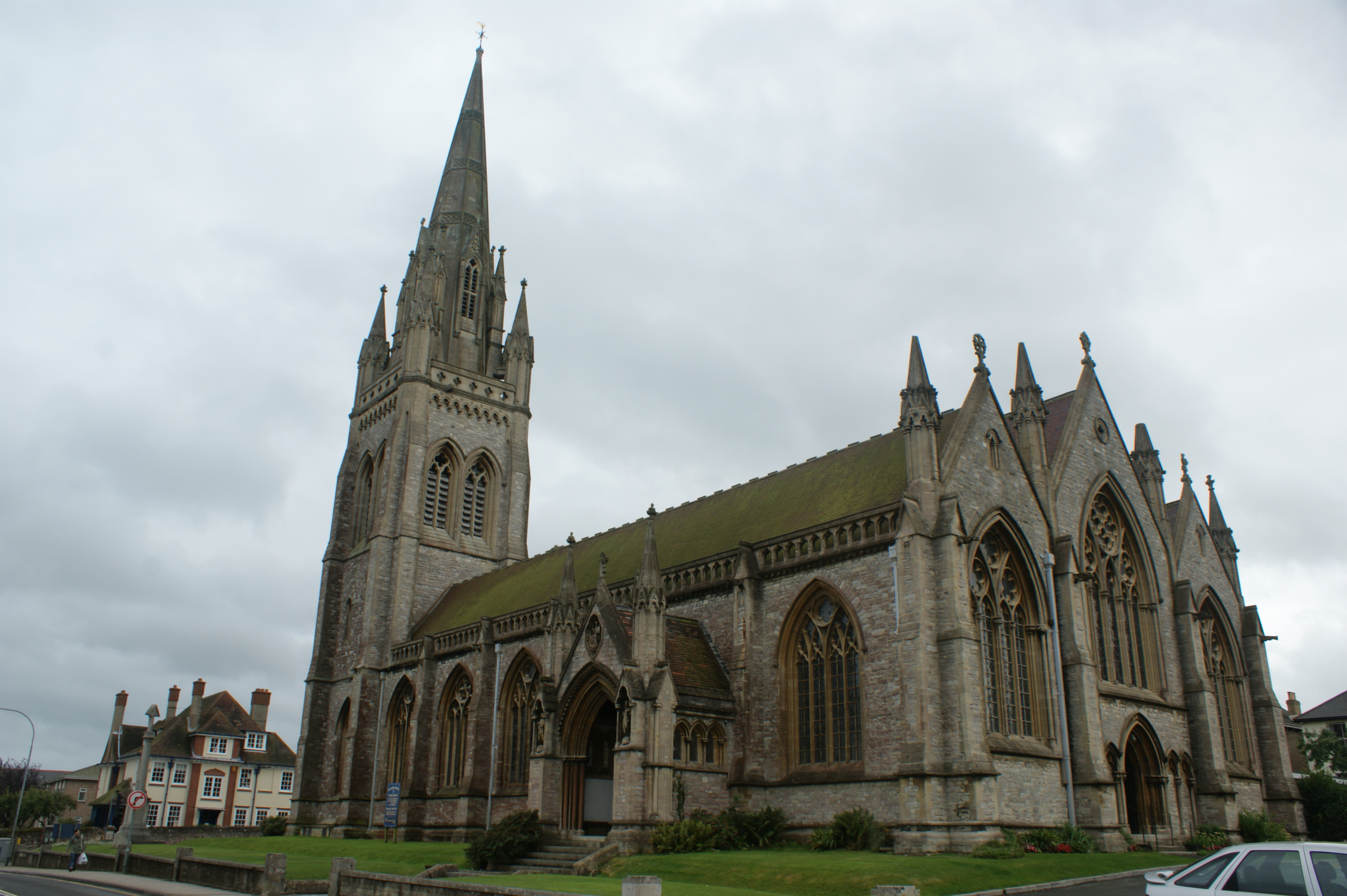
All Saints' Church

The twin church spires visible from the sea belong to All Saints' (the taller) and Holy Trinity churches. All Saints' Church is located in Queens Road on a road junction known as Five Ways. It was designed by George Gilbert Scott and completed in 1872. The spire is 177 feet (54 m) tall. Holy Trinity Church is in Dover Street. It was designed by Thomas Hellyer and completed in 1845. Holy Trinity Church closed in January 2014 and the building became the Aspire Ryde community centre.

St James' is a further Church of England church in the centre of Ryde, on Lind Street. It was constructed in 1827 as a proprietary chapel and continues to be active, with services at 10:30am and 6:30pm each Sunday and a range of youth and mid-week groups.

The town's Roman Catholic church, St Mary's in High Street, was built in 1846 at a cost of £18,000, provided by Elizabeth, Countess of Clare. It was designed by Joseph Hansom, inventor of the hansom cab. Other churches include the Anglican St James Church and St. Michael and All Angels, Swanmore. There are also Baptist, Methodist, United Reformed and Elim churches in the town.

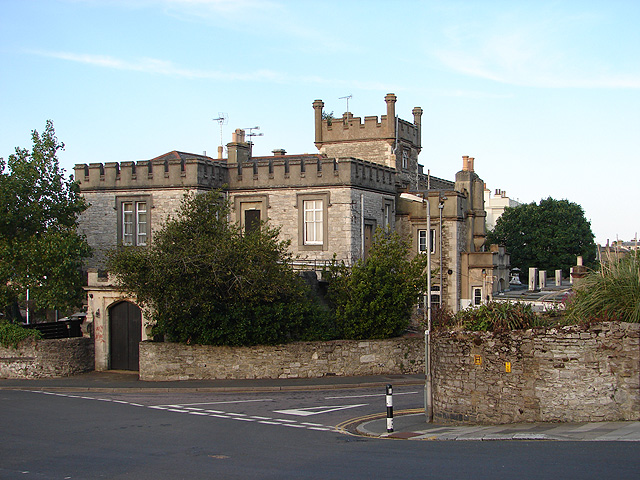
Ryde Castle

Ryde Castle, situated on the Esplanade, was built about 1840 as a private house in crenellated style and is now a hotel. It was heavily damaged by a fire in 2012 and underwent major restoration in 2013.

Beldornie Tower on Augusta Road was at one point a property of the Earl of Yarborough. Dating back to the 16th or early 17th century, the house was virtually rebuilt about 1840 in Gothic-Jacobean style. A west wing was added in 1880.

Ryde School With Upper Chine stands opposite All Saints' Church. The chief building, Westmont, is Grade II listed.

== Entertainment ==
Sited on the Esplanade are an ice rink and a pavilion. The former is no longer open to the public, and the Isle of Wight's ice-hockey team, the Wightlink Raiders, has disbanded. The pavilion houses a bowling alley and night club.

The town's local football team, for many years Ryde Sports F.C., has given way to Ryde Saints F.C. and Ryde F.C.

Speedway is staged just south of the town at Smallbrook Stadium. The Isle of Wight Islanders started as members of the Conference League before moving up to the Premier League.

=== Carnivals ===
Ryde has five carnivals in a typical year: the Mardi Gras in June (known as the Arts Parade from 2003 to 2012), Children's, Main and Illuminated processions at the end of August, and a Lantern Parade in December. The Carnival at Ryde is England's oldest.

== Notable residents ==
- Raymond Allen (1940–2022), a TV screenwriter (Some Mothers Do 'Ave 'Em), attended Ryde Secondary Modern School.
- Iris Brooke (1905–1981), artist and author, was born in Ryde.
- Sam Browne (1824–1901), the soldier after whom the belt was named, lived the last years of his life in a house called Argosy in East Hill Road.
- Sir Charles Clifford, 4th Baronet (1821–1895), barrister and Liberal member of Parliament, lived at Westfield House.
- Seb Clover (born 1987), sailor, was educated at Ryde School with Upper Chine.
- Melvyn Hayes (born 1935), actor, currently lives in Ryde.
- Cornelius Jabez Hughes (1819–1884), a Victorian photographer and daguerreotypist, worked and died in Ryde.
- William Hutt (1801–1882), a colonial administrator, was educated in Ryde and resided at Appley Towers.
- David Icke (born 1952), conspiracy theorist, broadcaster and author, lives in Ryde.
- Mark King (born 1958), a Level 42 musician originally from Gurnard, opened a pub in Union Street in the 1980s.
- Sir Charles Locock (1799–1875), obstetrician to Queen Victoria
- F. G. Loring (1869–1951), writer and naval officer, was born in Ryde.
- Karl Marx (1818–1883) and his wife Jenny Marx (1814–1881) visited Ryde for health reasons in the summer of 1874, staying in Nelson Street.
- Anthony Minghella (1954–2008), Hollywood director, was born in Ryde.
- Nicholas Morrill (born 1957), cricketer, was born in Ryde.
- Philip Norman (born 1943), writer, attended Ryde School and has written of his childhood in the town.
- Adam Pacitti (born 1988), internet personality, grew up in Ryde.
- Kieran Page (born 1983), professional road and track cyclist
- A. C. Pigou (1877–1959), economist, was born in Ryde.
- Wilf Pine (1944–2018), English music manager, record producer and gangster
- Albert Pollard (1869–1948), historian, was born in Ryde.
- Michael Sheard (1938–2005), actor (Mr Bronson in Grange Hill; Star Wars), lived in Ryde and died there.
- Walter Toogood (1874–1914), a professional golfer, was born in Ryde.
- M. J. Trow (born 1949), military historian and detective fiction writer, taught history and politics at Ryde High School.
- Edward Vernon Utterson (1775/1776–1856), lawyer and one of the Six Clerks in Chancery, literary antiquary, collector and editor, moved in 1840 from Newport to Beldornie Tower, Pelham Field, Ryde, and set up the Beldornie Press there. Has a memorial tablet in St Thomas's Church.
- Sarah Elizabeth Utterson (1781–1851), translator and author, moved in 1840 from Newport to Beldornie Tower, Pelham Field, Ryde. Has a memorial tablet in St Thomas's Church.

== See also ==
- Ryde Lifeboat Station
