= All Saints' Church, Ryde =

Church on the Isle of Wight, England

Coordinates: 50°43′38″N 01°10′01″W

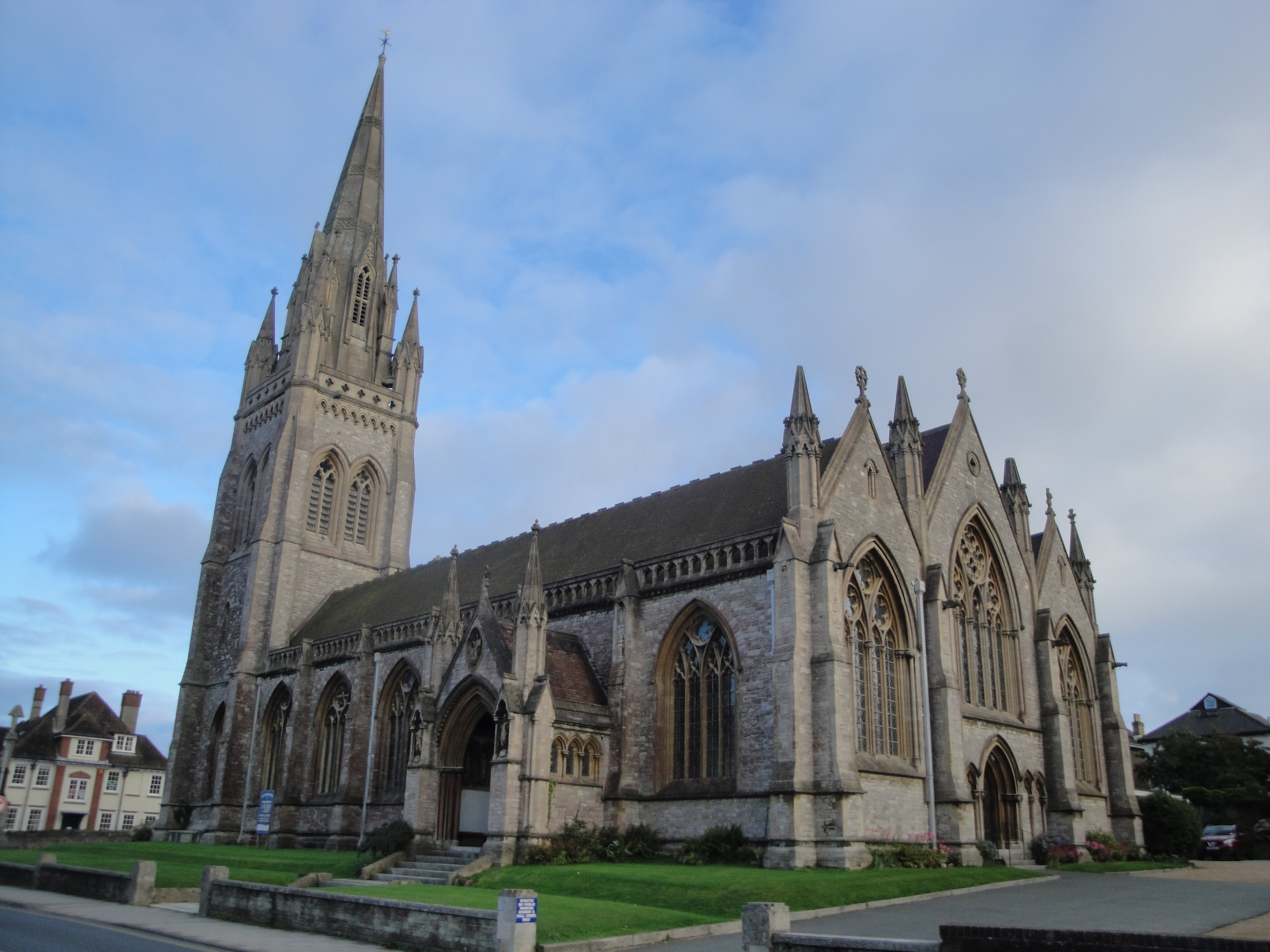
- All Saints' Church, Ryde
- All Saints' Church, Ryde
- Denomination: Church of England
- Website: http://www.rydeallsaints.co.uk/

History
- Dedication: All Saints

Administration
- Province: Canterbury
- Diocese: Portsmouth
- Archdeaconry: East Wight
- Parish: Ryde

All Saints' Church, Ryde is a parish church in the Church of England located in Ryde, Isle of Wight. The building is a landmark of the island, the spire being visible from many places around the Isle of Wight and from the mainland, projecting beyond the skyline. All Saints' is sometimes referred to as the "Cathedral of the Island" It is a Grade II* ecclesiastical listed building.

== Architecture ==
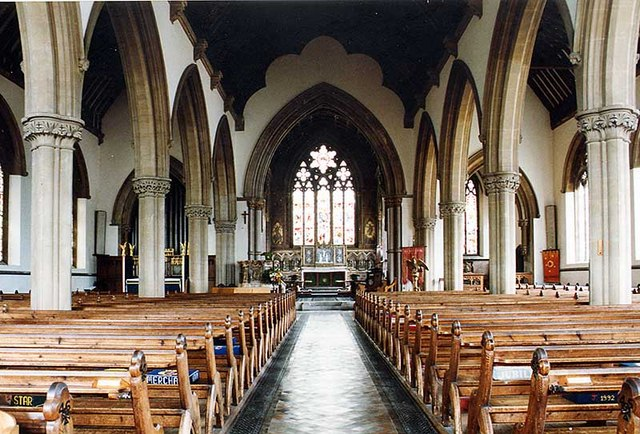
The interior of All Saints, designed 1868-1872 by George Gilbert Scott

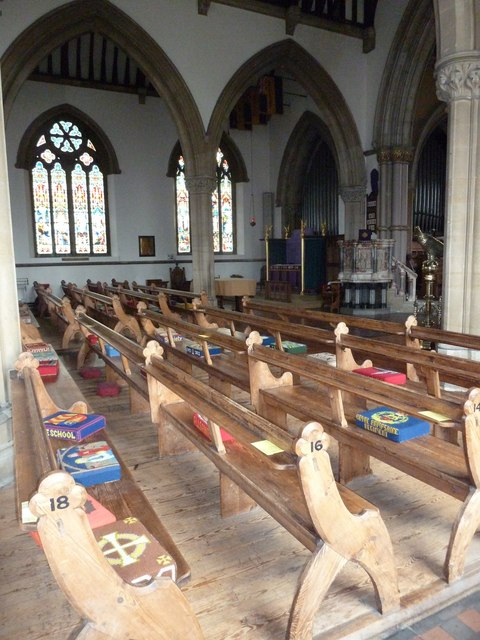
Original wooden benches specified by Scott

The church was built between 1868 and 1872 by the architect George Gilbert Scott. The spire was an addition of 1881/82. A previous tradition saw the spire climbed early on the Feast of the Ascension to sing an Ascension hymn.

All Saints' is listed as a 'large' church in ornate Second Pointed style, constructed of stone-rubble with ashlar dressings. There are six bay-pointed arcades with naturalistic capitals. The chancel walls were painted by Clayton and Bell. The vestry - now the choir song school - was added by C Pemberton-Leach in 1891.

There are two side chapels: The Warrior Chapel in the north aisle - which is a memorial chapel - and The Chapel of The Good Shepherd in the south aisle, which was the original sacristy. The pulpit, reredos and font are all typical Scott features, The pulpit is made of Derbyshire alabaster on polished marble columns, and appeared in The Great Exhibition of 1851, winning 1st prize in its class.

The tower contains a ring of eight bells cast by Messrs Taylor and Co of Loughborough in 1866.

There are some fine examples of stained glass windows but these are mostly confined to the north aisle and sanctuary areas, the other windows having been destroyed by enemy action during the Second World War. The window in the Chapel of the Good Shepherd is dedicated to the memory of Samuel Poole (d 1872).

On the north east corner of the church boundary is a Calvary cross war memorial.

A renovation plan was unveiled in 2024 to re-order the church interior. The scheme includes replacing the Victorian tiled floor with concrete and removing the wooden benches. The Victorian Society have objected to the scheme.

== Services and worship ==
Usual Sunday services: Sunday Services: Traditional Service (9.30am) a one-hour reflective Church of England service, with organ music, robed clergy and servers. Contemporary Worship Service (11am) The service includes a band-led worship, a short talk and prayer ministry. Kid's church runs at this service. Mid-Week Services Celtic Prayer (Thursdays at 9am) BCP Service (Fridays at 4pm) Communion Service (First Thursday of the month at 12pm) Special services and events can be found on the church website www.ryde.church

All Saints was selected in 2023 for a church planting project, with the aim of increasing the number of worshippers by introducing a more Evangelical style of contemporary worship.

== Choir ==
Until recently, an established choir existed at All Saints' which has been tradition since its consecration. The choir used to sing at all main services as well as the additional services listed above and at weddings and funerals. A new choir is currently in formation and will be singing again at services soon.

For many years, the choir has been affiliated to the Royal School of Church Music (RSCM) and the younger choristers were once trained using the RSCM 'Voice for Life' programme and also occasionally trained with other professionals.

In previous services, music sung ranged from Tallis and Byrd to more modern composers - communion settings by Kenneth Leighton and Grayston Ives and anthems by Malcolm Archer, Colin Mawby, Alan Ridout and Paul Edwards.

Prior to 2016, the choir sung evensong at the cathedrals of Portsmouth, Salisbury, Winchester and Chichester.

== Organ ==
The organ is by Henry Willis dating from 1874. A specification of the organ can be found on the National Pipe Organ Register.

== Organists and Directors of Music ==
- Sidney M. Lake 1864–1872
- W.B. Souter 1872–1874
- Frank H. Simms 1874–1889 (afterwards organist of St. Paul's Church, New Orleans, United States of America)
- W. Warden Harvey (FRCO) 1889–1894
- Rev. J. Godfrey Luard M.A. 1894–1896 said to have been organist at St Andrews, president of the Jeu de Paume de Parc Beaumont in Pau, France (1910–1919)
- Edmund Goldsmith 1896–1898
- Richard Yates Mander Mus. Doc. FRCO 1898–1913 (previously organist of St. Philip's Cathedral, Birmingham)
- Ernest G. Welsh (ARCO) 1913–1929 (previously organist at All Saints' Church Hessle)
- D J Bevan (ARCO) 1929–1932
- Osborne Edward Weare (FRCO) 1932–1934
- Earnest G. Welsh (ARCO) 1934–1946
- Wilfrid L. Reed 1946–1970
- John Lea BA Mus (Hons) LTCL 1970–1976
- John Flower 1976 (ARCO) subsequently Assistant from 1977 to 1995
- Derek Beck LRAM 1977–1984
- W W L Baker (FRCO - chair) LRAM 1984–1988
- R Weir BA LTCL 1988–1991
- John Lea (Director of Music) 1992–1996
- Andrew Cooper (Organist) 1995 onward
- Robert Weir (Director of Music) 1996–1998
- John Lea (Director of Music) 1998–2003
- Godfrey Davis MA ARCO (Director of Music) 2003–2010
- John Lea (Director of Music) 2010–2011
- Graeme Martin (Director of Music) 2011–2012
- John Lea (Director of Music) 2012 and, subsequently, esteemed Director of Music Emeritus
- Simon Jarvis BSc (hons), PGCE (Director of Music) 2013–2017
- Andrew Cooper Organist and Director of Music 2017–2020
- Alan Finch (Director of Music) 2020-

== Performances ==
The church's acoustic makes it a popular venue for various visiting performers and it hosts the choral section of The Isle of Wight Music, Dance and Drama Festival.

== Vicars of Ryde ==
- [William] Harding Girdlestone DD 1867–1868
- Alexander Poole MA 1868–1891
- John Shearme MA 1891–1905 [Hon. Canon of Winchester Cathedral]
- Albert Gossage Robinson MA 1905–1908 [Hon. Canon of Winchester Cathedral]
- Hugh Le Fleming MA 1908–1927
- George Alexander Johnstone MA 1927–1932 [Hon. Canon of Portsmouth Cathedral]
- William Neville Martin MA 1932–1936
- Reginald Stuart Moxon DD 1937–1946
- Alexander Cory MA 1946–1952 [Hon. Canon of Portsmouth Cathedral]
- Ralph Harry Bassett MA 1953–1962
- Ronald Harry Granger 1963–1970 [Hon. Canon of Portsmouth Cathedral]
- Patrick Connor Magee 1970–1972
- Douglas John Turner 1972–1981
- Ernest James Green 1982–1991
- David William Dale 1992–1998
- David Blair Foss 1999–2001
- Jonathan Francis Redvers Harris 2003–2011
- Graham Edwin Morris 2012–2018
- Interregnum 2019
- Samantha Martell 2020–2021
- Heath Monaghan (Rector) 2024 -
- Oliver Mitchelmore (Team Vicar) 2024-
- David Morgan (Team Vicar) 2024-
