= Ryde Town Hall =

Municipal building in Ryde, Isle of Wight, England

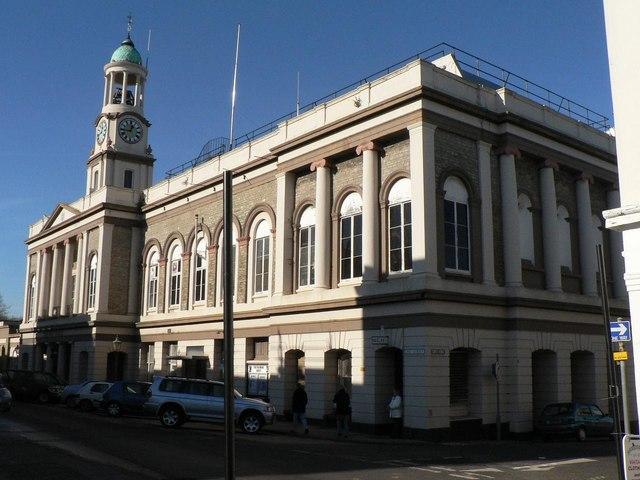
- Ryde Town Hall

- Shown on the Isle of Wight
- 50.7300°N 1.1645°W
- Location: Lind Street, Ryde

History
- Built: 1831

Site notes
- Architect: James Sanderson
- Architectural style: Neoclassical style

Listed Building – Grade II
- Official name: The Town Hall
- Designated: 18 May 1972
- Reference no.: 1217046

Ryde Town Hall is a municipal structure in Lind Street in Ryde, Isle of Wight, England. The town hall, which was the headquarters of Ryde Borough Council, is a Grade II listed building.

== History ==
The foundation stone for the building was laid by the physician, Dr John Lind, on 14 May 1830. It was designed by James Sanderson of London in the neoclassical style, built in coursed stone and opened as the local market hall in 1831. The original design was arcaded on the ground floor, so that markets could be held. It included a symmetrical main block with five bays facing onto Lind Street; the central section of three bays, which was recessed on both floors, featured a tetrastyle portico with Doric order columns supporting an entablature on the ground floor and a similar portico but with Ionic order columns supporting a pediment on the first floor. There were three round headed sash windows at the rear of the first floor portico and iron railings bearing the town's coat of arms at the front. The end bays of the main block contained archways on the ground floor and round headed sash windows flanked by pilasters on the first floor. There were single-storey wings of eight bays each to the east and the west of the main block. Internally, the principal rooms included the council chamber, committee rooms and a public hall on the first floor, with a magistrates' court and various offices below.

In 1867 a three-stage clock tower was erected on top of the central block of the building; designed by Thomas Dashwood, it was topped with a cupola, a dome and a weather vane. The chiming clock, by Moore & Sons of Clerkenwell, was given by Miss Player, the lady of the manor; it sounded the Westminster Quarters on a set of hemispherical bells in the cupola. Following significant population growth, partly due to the number of boatyards in the town, the area became a municipal borough in 1868. At around this time the east wing was increased in height to two storeys to a design by a local architect, Francis Newman. The expansion created a new assembly hall, capable of seating 750 people, which was formally opened on 14 April 1869; it backed on to the original public hall and the two could be combined when required to create a larger space. The new hall was augmented when an organ was installed to celebrate Queen Victoria's Diamond Jubilee in the late 19th century. The building was badly damaged in a major fire in 1933 but subsequently restored.

The building continued to serve as the headquarters of Ryde Borough Council for much of the 20th century but ceased to be the local seat of government after the enlarged Medina Borough Council was formed in 1974. A programme of works, to a design by the council surveyor, Nigel Hayton, to convert the first floor of the building into a theatre was completed in March 1991. The theatre incorporated a balcony and featured extensive decorative plasterwork and a proscenium arch. After the theatre closed in February 2005, the facility was used as a music venue: performers at the town hall included the rock band, The Stranglers, in July 2009. The venue closed completely in April 2010 and the building was sold to a developer in January 2013. However, by October 2020, the development had not progressed and the building was badly vandalised. In November 2020 Ryde Town Council decided to take a three-year lease on the building with a view to raising the finance to acquire and restore it.
