= St Philip's Cathedral, Birmingham =

Birmingham Cathedral
- Cathedral Church of Saint Philip, Birmingham
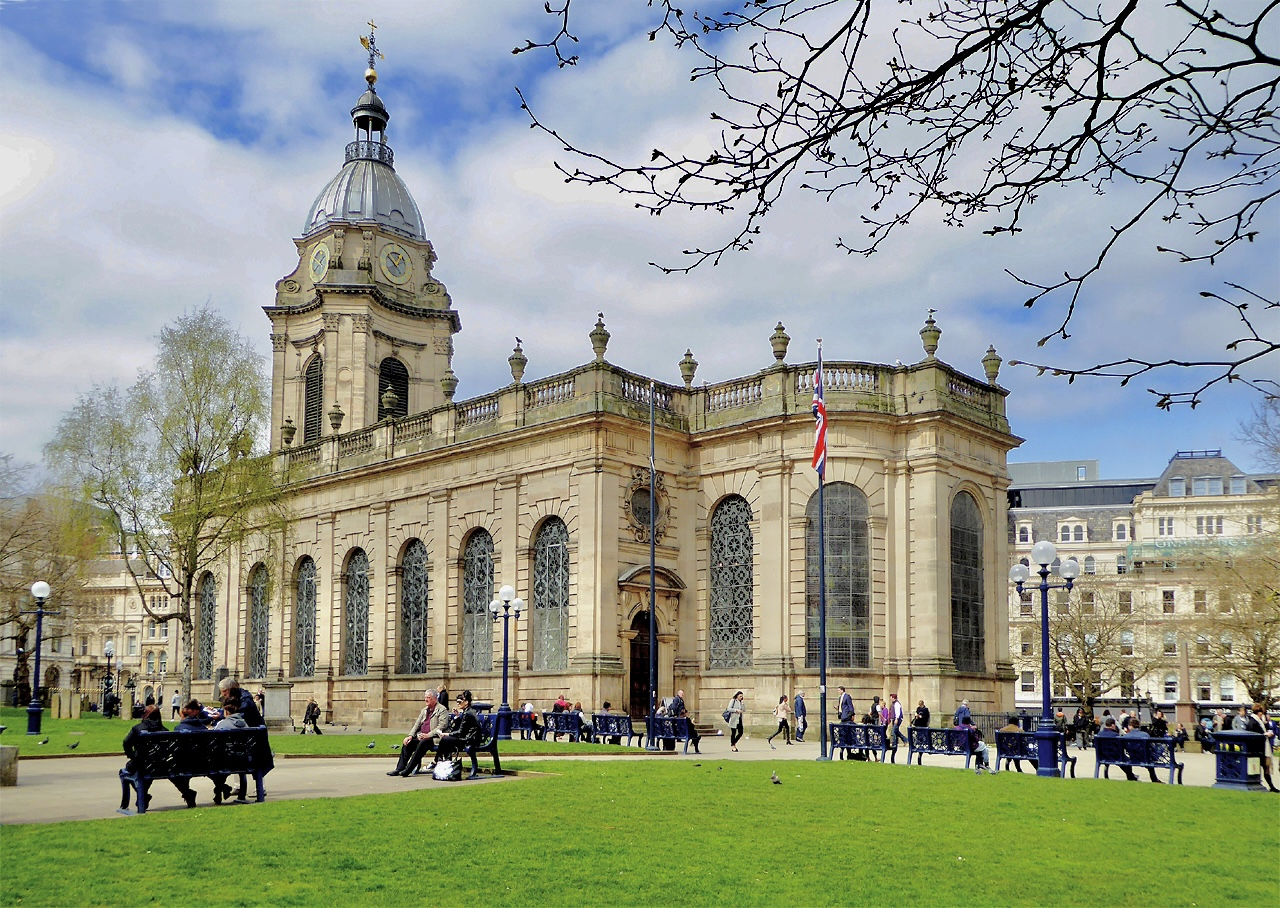
- The cathedral viewed from the south
- Birmingham Cathedral
- 52°28′52″N 1°53′56″W
- OS grid reference: SP 06963 87032
- Location: Birmingham
- Country: England
- Denomination: Church of England
- Tradition: Anglo-Catholicism
- Website: birminghamcathedral.com

Architecture
- Architect: Thomas Archer
- Style: Baroque
- Years built: 1710-1725

Administration
- Province: Canterbury
- Diocese: Birmingham

Clergy
- Bishop: Michael Volland
- Dean: Matt Thompson

The Cathedral Church of Saint Philip, also called the Birmingham Cathedral, is a Church of England cathedral and the seat of the Bishop of Birmingham. Built as a parish church in the Baroque style by Thomas Archer, it was consecrated in 1715. Located on Colmore Row in central Birmingham, St Philip's became the cathedral of the newly formed Diocese of Birmingham in 1905. The cathedral is a Grade I listed building.

== History ==
=== Founding ===
St Philip's Church was planned when the nearby medieval church of St Martin in the Bull Ring became insufficient to house its congregation because of the growing population of Birmingham. The land, previously named the Barley Close, was donated by Robert Philips in 1710. It is one of the highest points in the district and is said to be at the same level as the cross on St Paul's Cathedral in London. Following an Act of Parliament, construction commenced in 1711, to the design of Thomas Archer, and was ready for consecration in 1715, when it was dedicated to the Apostle Philip as a tribute to the benefactor Robert Philips. It appears to have been Archer's first church, apart from a rebuilt chancel at Chicheley attributed to him. Construction was estimated to cost £20,000, but the final figure was only £5,012. (equivalent to £950,000 in 2025). This was because many of the materials were donated and transported to the site at no cost. St Philip's served as a Parish church from 1715 to 1905.

The church contained St. Philip's Parish Library, which was bequeathed to the church by William Higgs. In 1792, a library room was constructed next to the parsonage house by Spencer Madan and was named the Parochial Library.

=== Cathedral ===
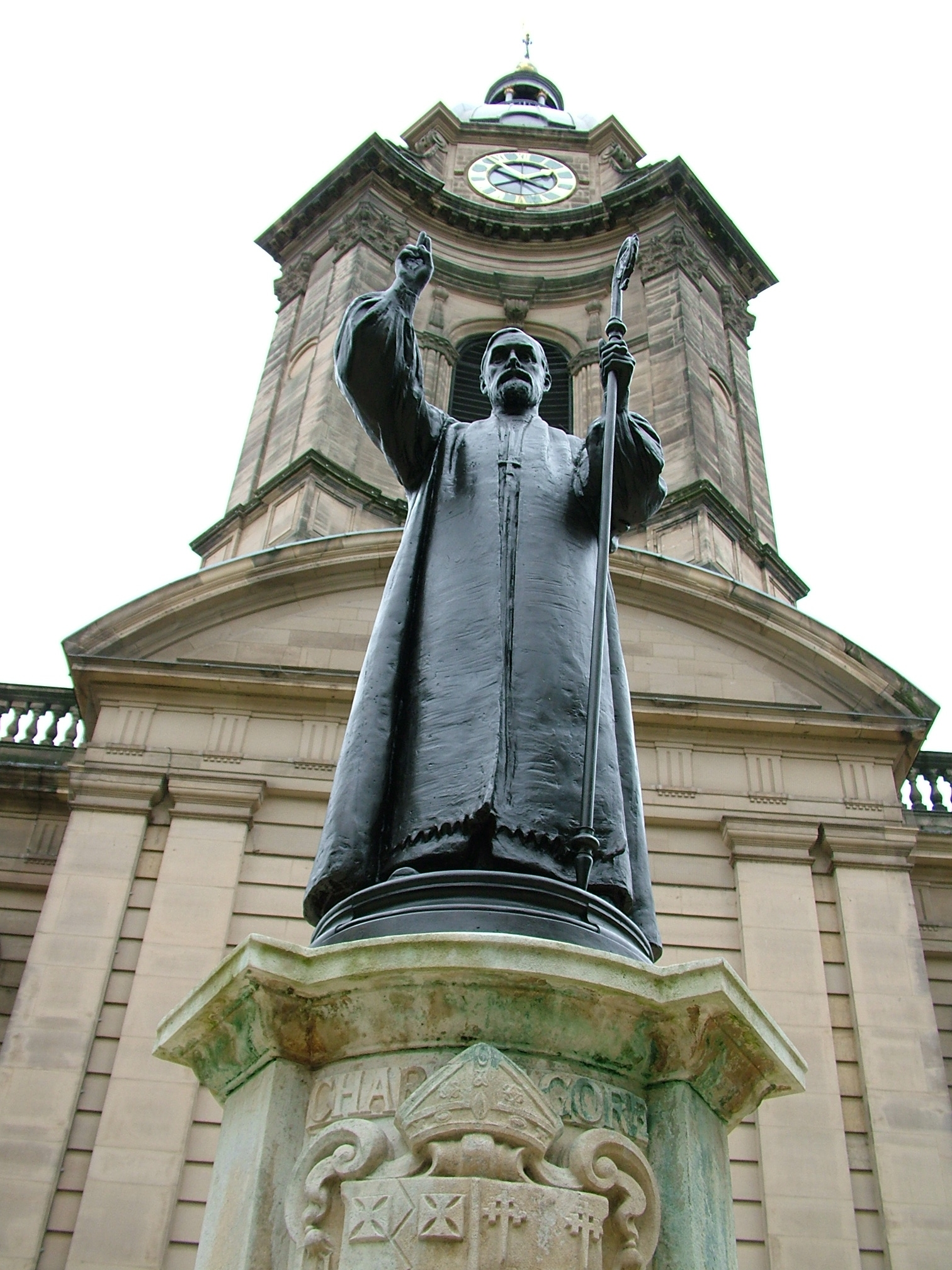
Statue of Charles Gore, the 1st Bishop of Birmingham, by Thomas Stirling Lee

With the growth of industrial towns in the 18th and 19th centuries, there was a consequent growth in the number of parishes, and a need for new administrative centres. Birmingham became a city in 1889. While the cities of Liverpool and Truro constructed new cathedrals, in a number of other cities existing churches and ancient abbeys were raised to the administrative status of cathedrals. Through the actions of the statesman Joseph Chamberlain and the Bishop of Worcester, Charles Gore, St Philip's became the Cathedral of Birmingham in 1905, with Charles Gore as its first bishop.

=== World War II ===
During World War II, the cathedral was bombed and gutted on the 7 November 1940. Its most significant treasures, several windows by Edward Burne-Jones, had been removed in the early stages of the war by Birmingham Civic Society, and were replaced, unharmed, when the building was restored in 1948.

== Architecture ==
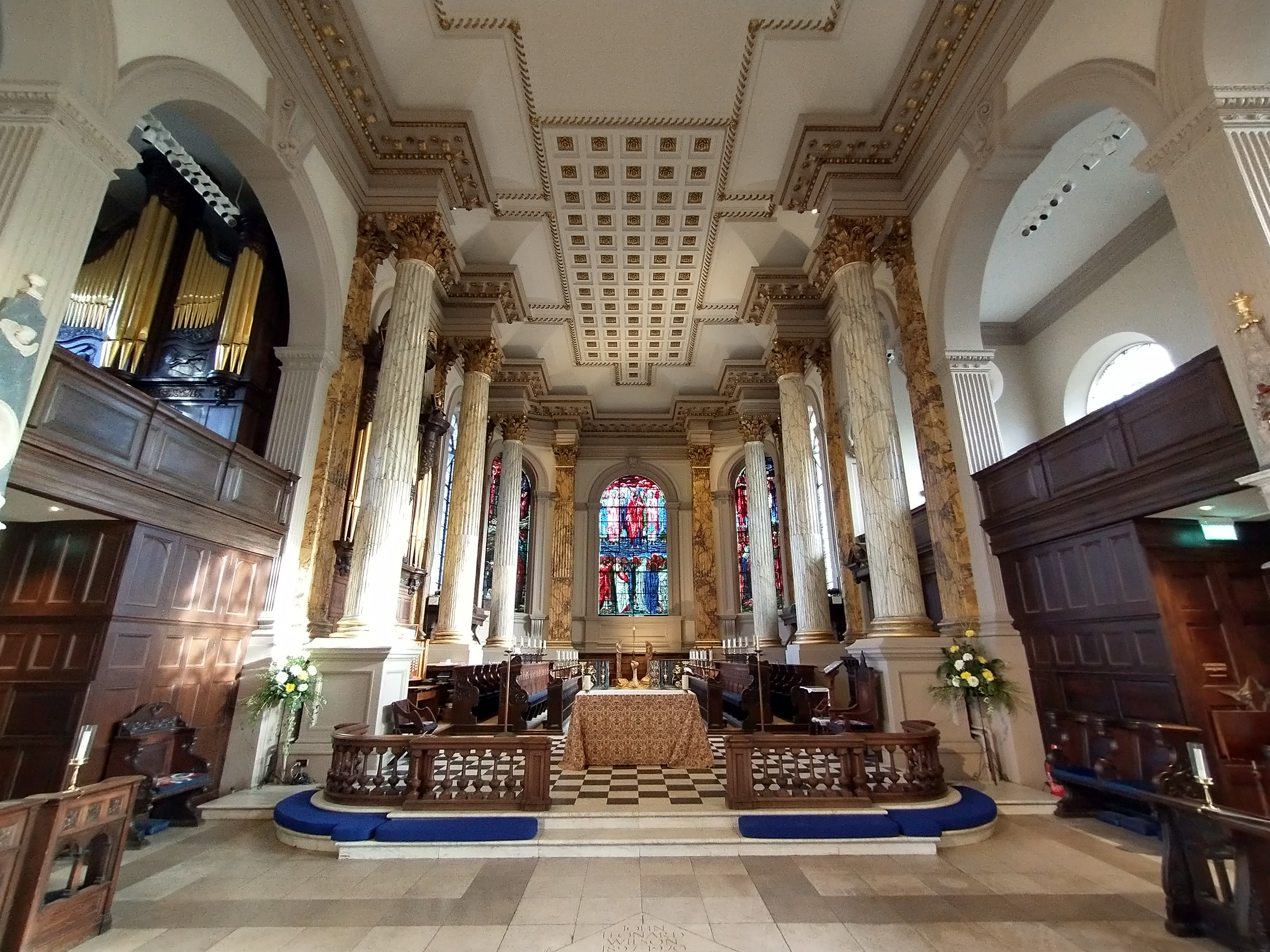
The Altar

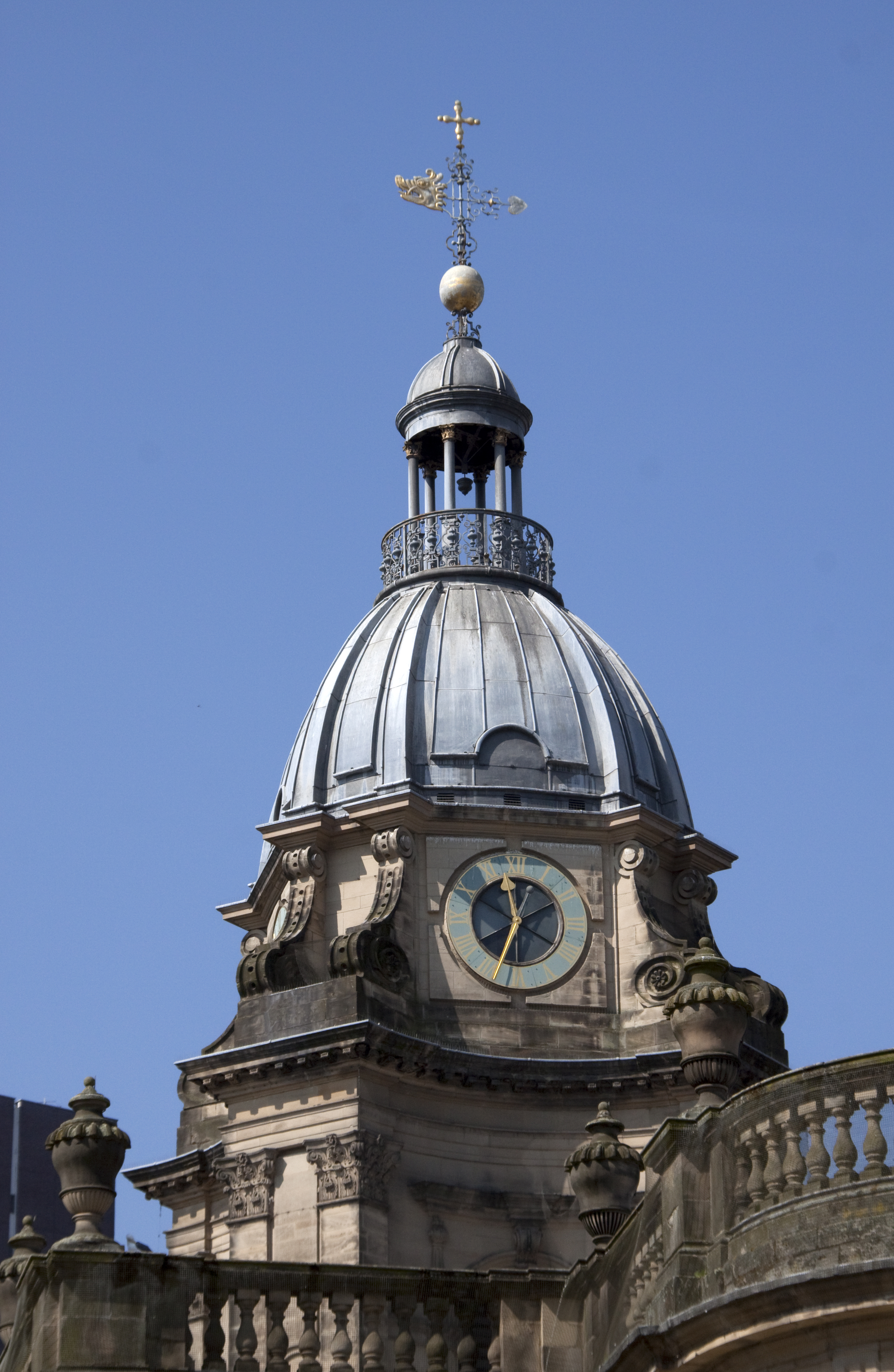
The dome of the western tower

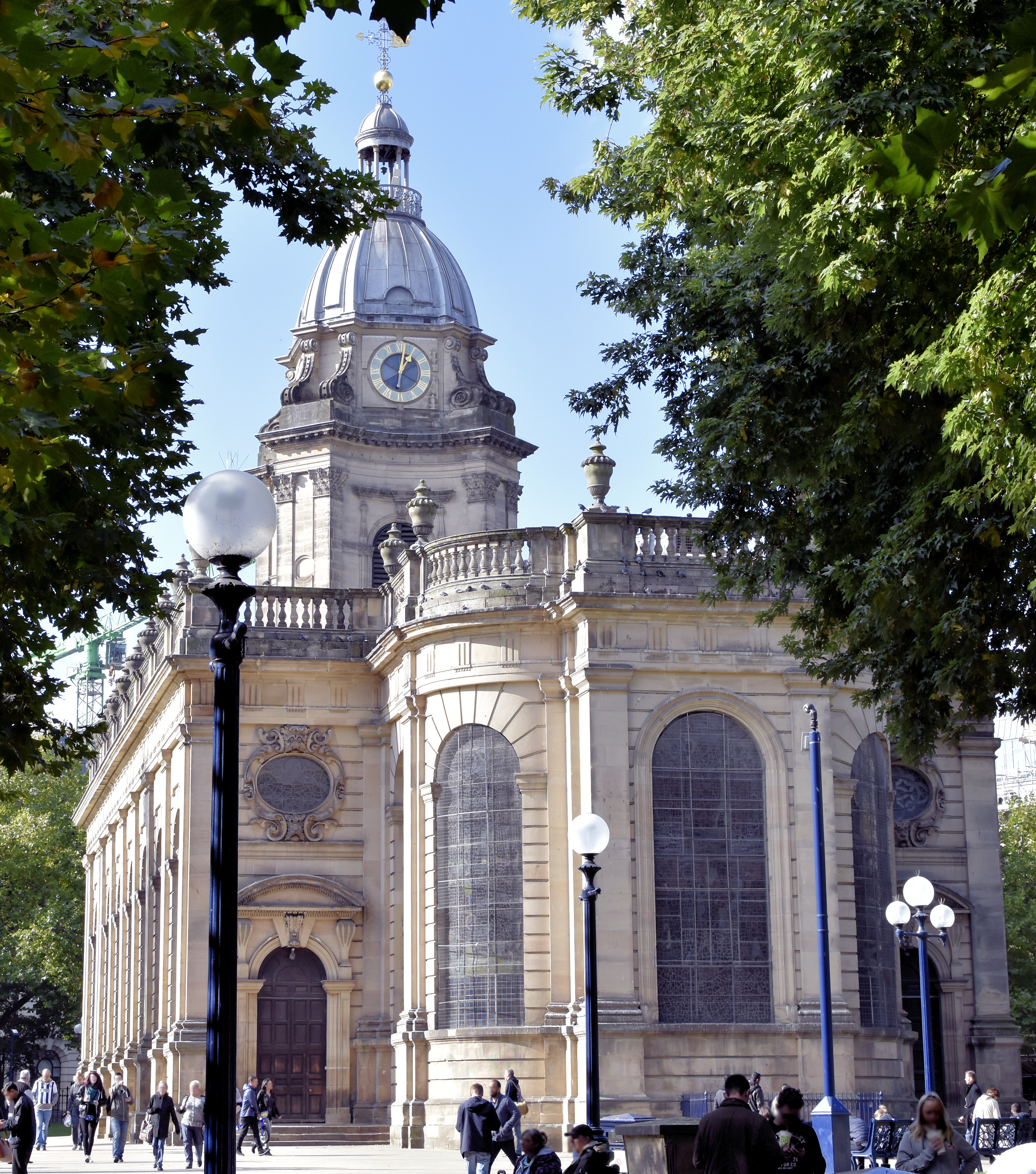
An exterior view of the cathedral in Birmingham

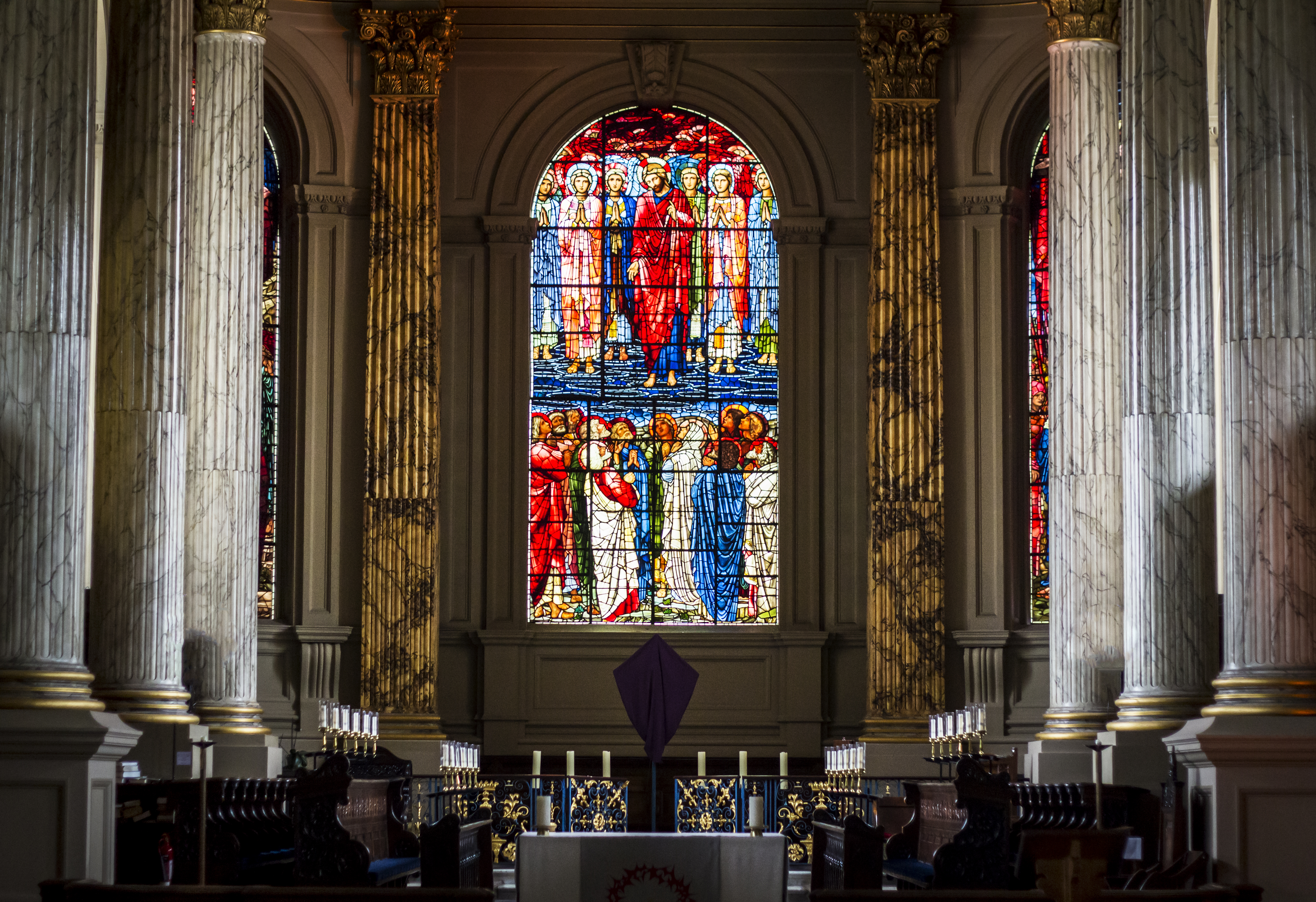
The chancel, which features stained glass by Edward Burne-Jones

St Philip's was designed by Thomas Archer and constructed between 1711 and 1715. The tower was complete by 1725, and the urns on the parapet were added in 1756. Archer had visited Rome and his design, in the Baroque style, is influenced by the churches of Borromini, being rather more Italianate than churches by Christopher Wren. The rectangular hall church interior has aisles separated from the nave by fluted pillars of classical form with Tuscan capitals supporting an arcade surmounted by a heavily projecting cornice. Wooden galleries are stretched between the pillars in a manner typical of English Baroque churches.

Outside the cathedral, tall windows are interspaced by pilasters in low relief, supporting a balustrade at roof level with an urn rising above each pilaster. The western end is marked by a single tower which rises in stages and is surmounted by a lead-covered dome and a delicate lantern. The building is of brick and is faced with stone quarried on Archer's estate at Umberslade.

The original shallow eastern apse was extended in 1884–88 by J. A. Chatwin into a much larger chancel, articulated by strongly projecting Corinthian columns. This bold design is made richer by the marbled surfaces of the columns and pilasters, the gilding of capitals and cornice and the ornately coffered ceiling. Chatwin also refaced the exterior of the building because the stone from the original quarry was very soft. The tower was refaced in 1958–59.

Edward Burne-Jones, who was born in nearby Bennett's Hill and baptised in the church, added to the enhancement of St Philips by the donation of several windows, of which three are at the eastern end. The west window, also by Burne-Jones, was dedicated in memory of Henry Bowlby in 1897.

Six of the monuments have heritage listings, including one commemorating two men who died during the construction of Birmingham Town Hall and a memorial to the victims of 1974's Birmingham pub bombings. Thomas Stirling Lee's statue of Charles Gore, vested in convocation robes with his right hand raised in blessing, is located at the West entrance.

== Grounds ==
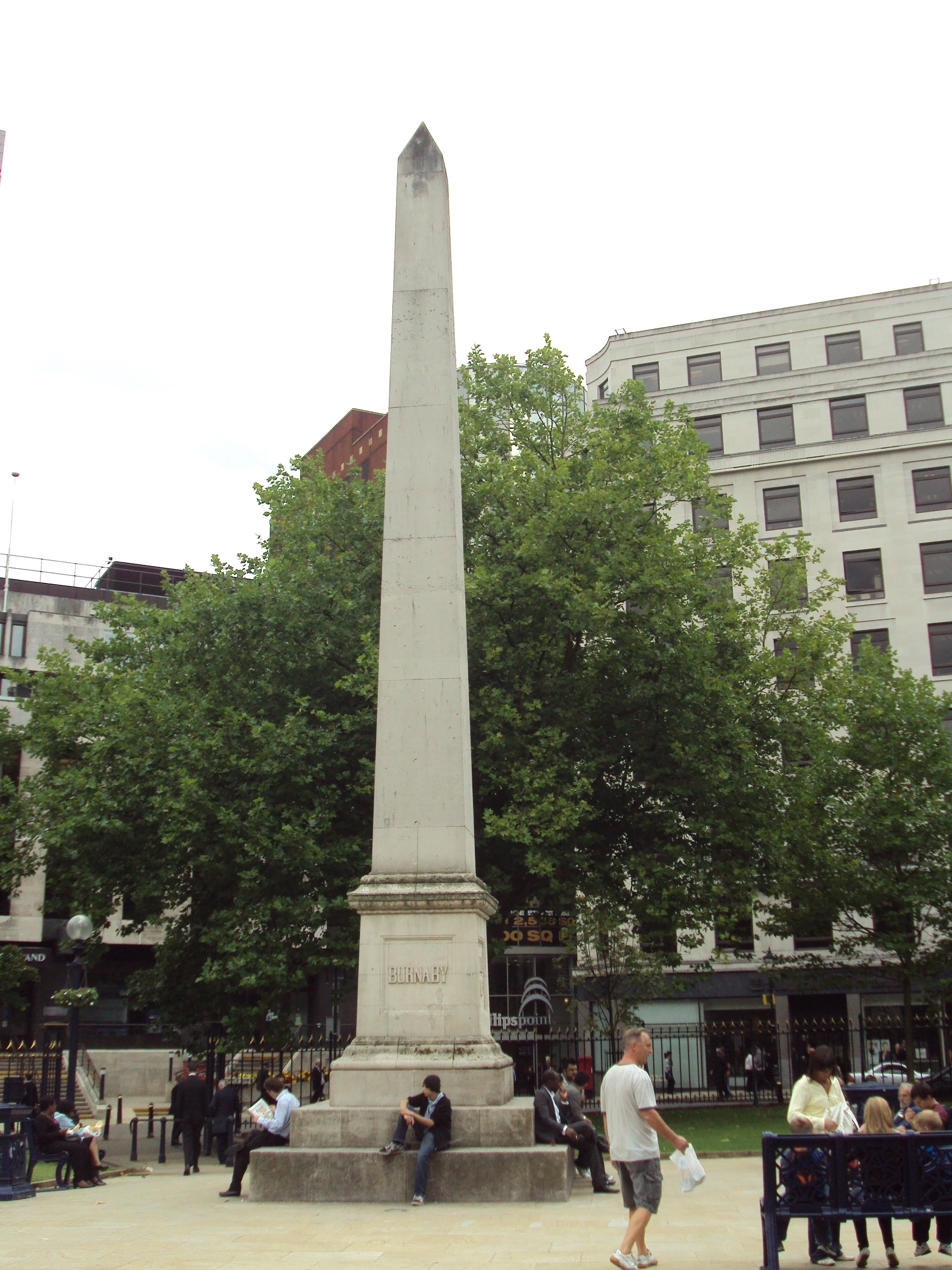
The Burnaby obelisk

Outside the Cathedral, a large Portland stone obelisk commemorates Frederick Gustavus Burnaby. Besides Burnaby's bust, in relief, it carries only the word "Burnaby", and the dated place names "Khiva 1875" and "Abu Klea 1885". These refer to the Khanate of Khiva and Battle of Abu Klea, respectively; he was killed at the latter. The obelisk was unveiled by Lord Charles Beresford on 13 November 1885. An earlier red marble was erected in 1857 to commemorate the life and death of Lieutenant-Colonel Thomas Unett, who died leading his men during the Siege of Sevastopol. Upon completion of the Burnaby building, it was decided to prohibit monuments from being added to the interior.

There is a small weathered grave marking the burial of Nanette Stocker, an actress who toured the country. Of Austrian origin, she was a dancer and musician that gained a large following and passed away at the age of 39 on 4th May 1819 during her headline act at the Onion Fair carnival in Aston. Her grave reads "In Memory of Nanetta (sic) Stocker who departed this Life May 4th 1819 Aged 39 Years The smallest Woman ever in this Kingdom possessed with every accomplishment only 33 Inches high a native of Austria.

The grounds are known colloquially as "Pigeon Park".

== Dean and chapter ==
- Dean – Matt Thompson (since 30 September 2017 installation)
- Canon Precentor – Nathan Mulcock (since 2 March 2025 installation)
- Canon Missioner – Andy Delmege (since 26 July 2020 installation)

== Music ==
=== Organ ===
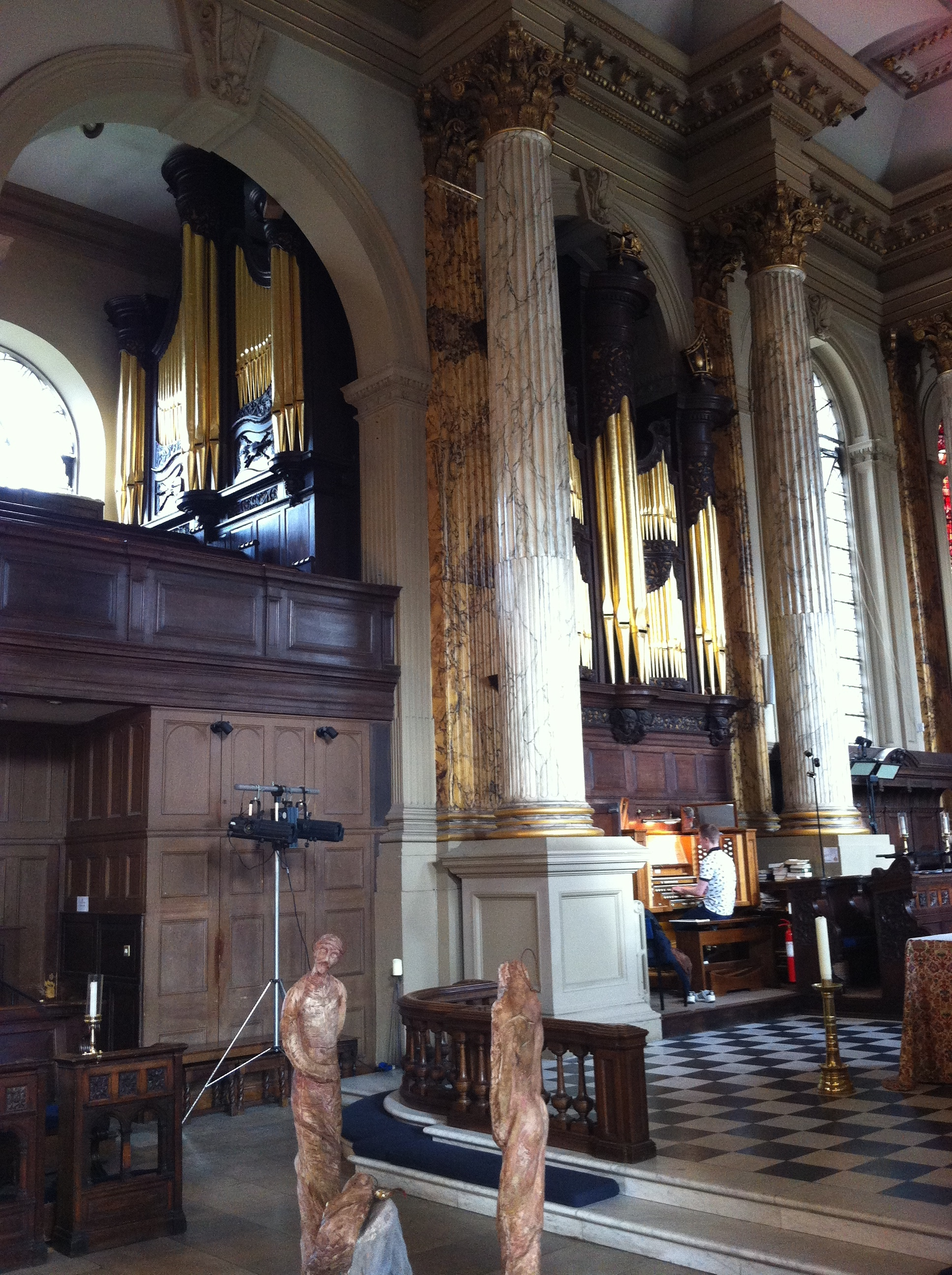
The cathedral's organ

The organ, originally built by Thomas Swarbrick, still dates in part from 1715. It underwent repairs during the late 19th century and was moved from its original position in the gallery. It has been restored, enlarged and modernised several times, most recently by Nicholson's in 1993. Details of the organ can be found at the National Pipe Organ Register.

=== Organists ===
Directors of Music and assistant organists at St Philip's Cathedral, Birmingham, have included composers Charles John Blood Meacham, Richard Yates Mander, and Rupert Jeffcoat. Until 2018, the Director of Music was Marcus Huxley, and the Head of Music is now David Hardie with Ashley Wagner as the Assistant Head of Music.

== Bells ==
Following the completion of the tower in 1725 Joseph Smith of Edgbaston provided a ring of eight bells which were subsequently augmented to ten, the tenor weighing approximately 26 cwt (1,320 kg). These bells were to prove unsatisfactory for in 1751 the vestry resolved to have them recast by Thomas Lester of the Whitechapel Bell Foundry in London. The new bells were slightly larger than the previous, with a tenor weighing 29 long cwt 0 qr 18 lb (3,266 lb or 1,481 kg) in the key of D—a total weight of 125 long cwt 3 qr 1 lb (14,085 lb or 6,389 kg), and hung in a wooden frame.

Throughout the late 18th and 19th centuries, the bells were well used, however, from 1906, the bells had become unringable, due in part to concerns about the safety of the tower. Ringing was briefly revived in 1921 but when the Coronation of 1937 provided the impetus to restore the bells they had been unringable again for several years.

The 1937 restoration was carried out by the Croydon bell founders, Gillett & Johnston, the bells being recast and hung in a cast-iron frame at the base of the large louvre windows. The same foundry cast two additional treble bells in 1949, given by Frank B Yates, to complete the ring of twelve bells that exists today. The tenor bell weighs 31 long cwt 21 lb (3,493 lb or 1,584 kg) and is in the key of D.

In 2004, the Whitechapel Bell Foundry carried out rehanging and refurbishment of the frame and fittings, including further strengthening work to the upper frame and the installation of a viewing gallery, accessed from the original belfry doorway. Brian Yates, grandson of the above Frank Yates, was the principal donor for this project.

== Clock ==
The tower clock was built by John Moore & Sons of Clerkenwell and installed in 1851 at a cost of £400 (equivalent to £48,300 in 2025).

== See also ==
- St Philip
- List of cathedrals in the United Kingdom
- St Chad's (Catholic)
- Dormition of the Mother of God and St Andrew (Greek Orthodox)
- Provosts of Birmingham Cathedral
