= Organs and organists of Chichester Cathedral =

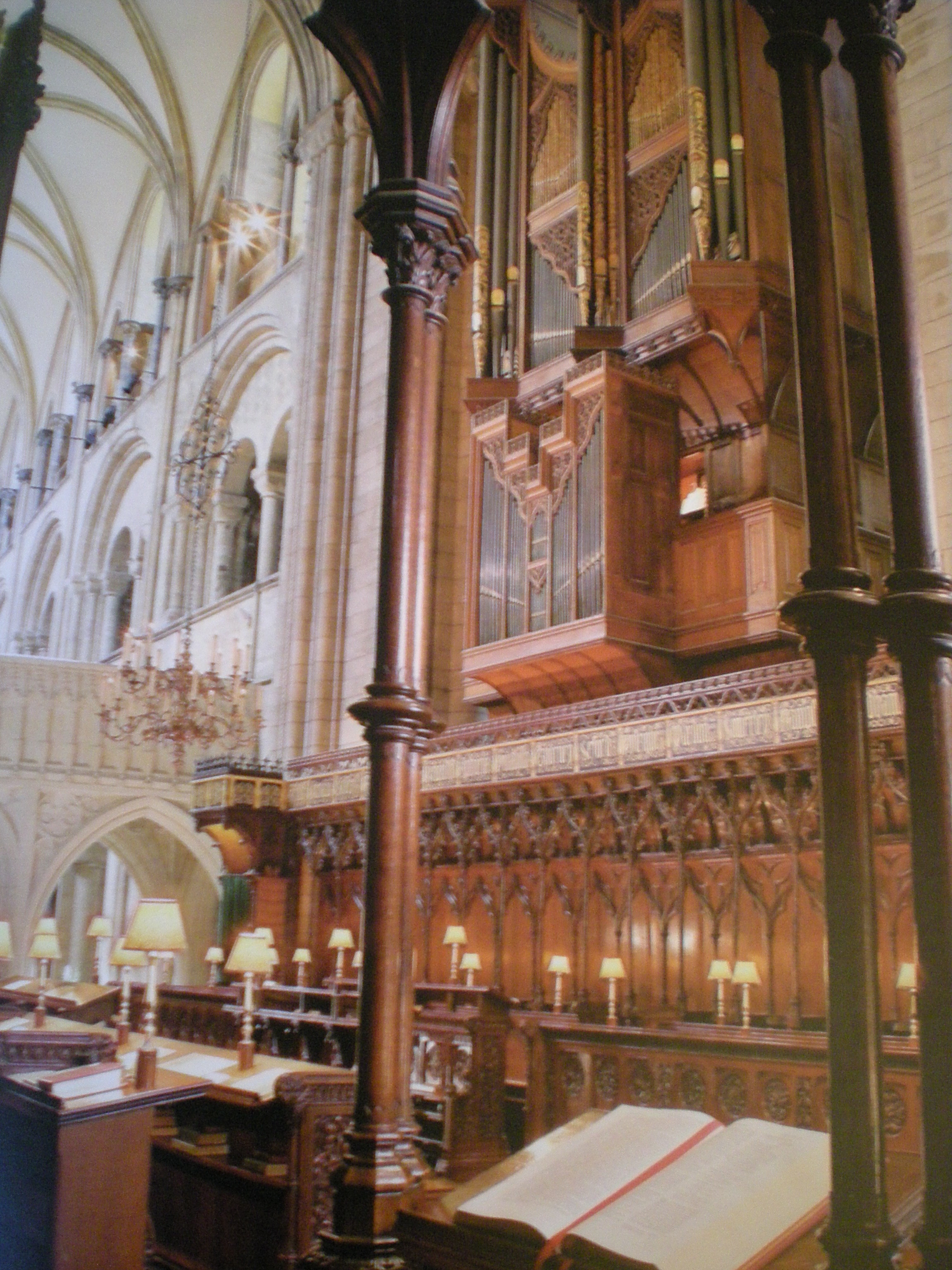
The Main Organ, in its current position in the quire

The organs of Chichester Cathedral are the major source of instrumental music at the cathedral, being played for daily services and accompanying the choir, as well as being used for concerts and recitals. There has been organ music at Chichester Cathedral almost continuously since the medieval period, with a break in the mid-17th century during the Commonwealth period.

There are now five pipe organs at Chichester Cathedral, with pipes of the main organ dating to the Restoration, the Hurdis Organ to the late 18th century and the three most recent organs dating to the late 20th century.

The earliest recorded Organist of Chichester Cathedral is William Campion in 1543, and the earliest recorded Master of the Choristers is Richard Martyn in the 1550s. The role of "Organist" has been combined with that of "Master of the Choristers" since 1801 – the first Organist and Master of the Choristers was James Target. Since the 1870s there has been an official appointment of an "Assistant Organist".

Several well-known composers, including Thomas Weelkes and John Reading (snr), have served as cathedral organist. Anne Maddocks (Assistant Organist, 1942–49) was the first woman in the country to hold such a post in a cathedral, and Sarah Baldock (Organist and Master of the Choristers, 2008–14) was the second woman, after Katherine Dienes at Guildford Cathedral, to hold the most senior musical post in a Church of England cathedral.

== Organs ==
=== Main Organ ===
Great
Double Open Diapason	16'
Open Diapason I	8'
Open Diapason II	8'
Stopped Diapason	8'
Principal	4'
Suabe Flute	4'
Twelfth	2^{2}/_{3}'
Fifteenth	2'
Flageolet	2'
Tierce	1^{3}/_{5}'
Full Mixture III
Sharp Mixture II
Trumpet	8'
Clarion	4'

Choir
Stopped Diapason	8'
Dulciana	8'
Principal	4'
Flute	4'
Fifteenth	2'
Nineteenth	1^{1}/_{3}'
Mixture II
Tremulant

Swell
Double Diapason	16'
Open Diapason	8'
Stopped Diapason	8'
Salicional	8'
Vox Angelica	8'
Principal	4'
Flute	4'
Fifteenth	2'
Mixture III
Fagotto	16'
Cornopean	8'
Hautboy	8'
Clarion	4'
Tremulant

Solo
Wald Flute	8'
Flauto Traverso	4'
Cornet III-V
Cremona	8'
Posaune	8'
Tremulant

Pedal
Open Diapason	16'
Violone	16'
Bourdon	16'
Quint	10^{2}/_{3}'
Principal	8'
Fifteenth	4'
Mixture IV
Contra Fagotto	32'
Trombone	16'

Nave
Open Diapason	8'
Stopped Diapason	8'
Principal	4'
Flute	4'
Fifteenth	2'
Mixture IV

Pedal (Nave)
Subbass	16'

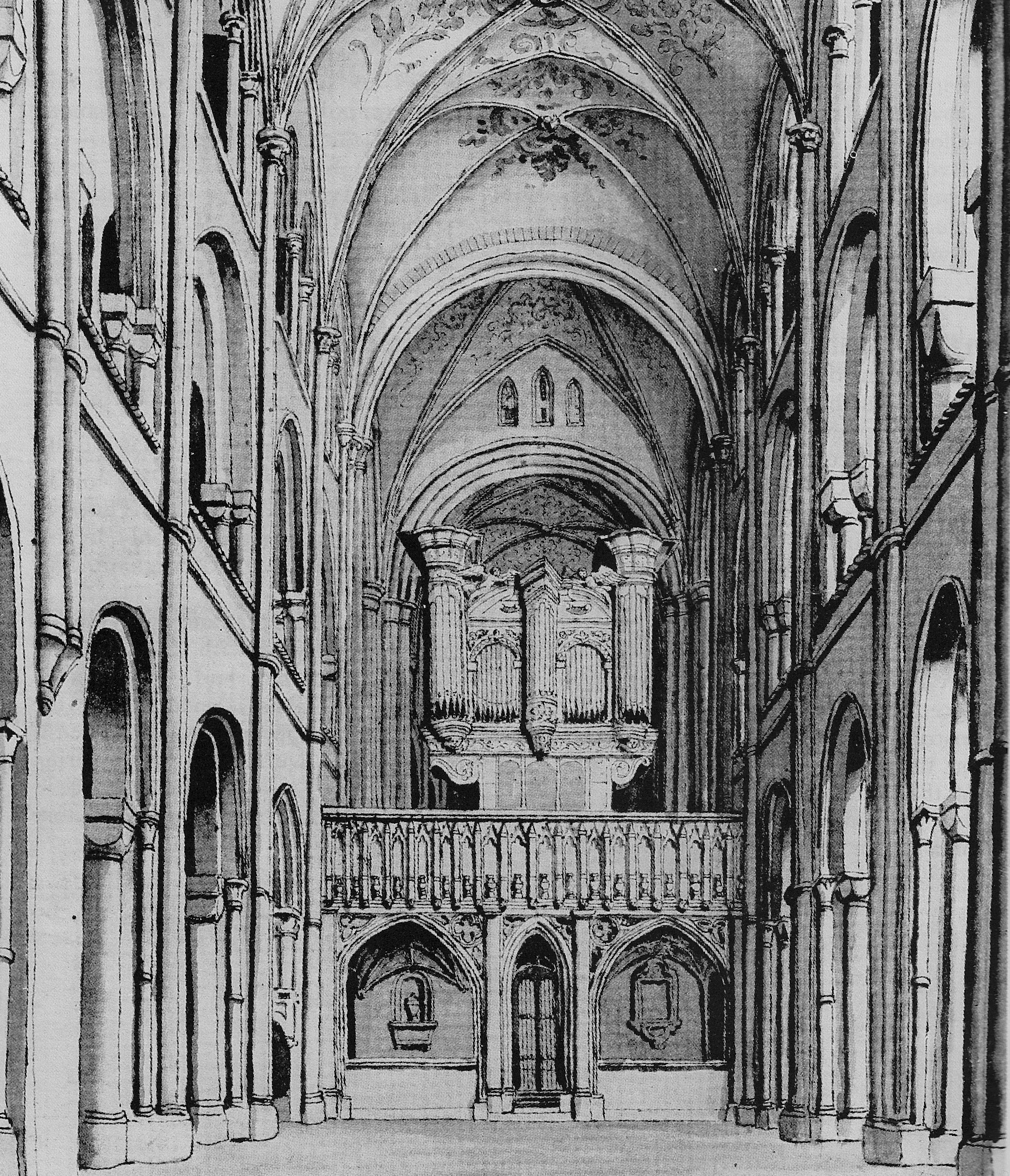
View of the Harris organ, from the nave, c.1780

The earliest organs in the cathedral were destroyed by the forces of Colonel Waller during the period of the Commonwealth. Following the Restoration of the Monarchy, Renatus Harris built a one-manual organ on the screen in 1678; the pipes of the organ still form the heart of the present instrument. In 1725, John Byfield added the Choir Organ and Thomas Knight added the third keyboard, the swell, in 1778. Further additions were made in the 19th century by George Pike England (1806) Henry Pilcher & Sons (1829) before, in 1859, the great Victorian organ builder William Hill was employed to move the organ from the screen to its present position. The collapse of the tower and spire in 1861 left the organ a mid-19th century instrument, as all the money that could be raised at the time was spent on the building and furnishings rather than on the organ. The organ was restored further by Hele of Plymouth in 1904, but neglect dictated by financial constraints meant that in 1972 its working mechanism was in such a parlous state that the organ had to be abandoned as unplayable. After a silence of fourteen years it was eventually restored by Mander in 1984–86. Today it is widely regarded as a very special part of the heritage of English organs and it is the only surviving example of an English classical, rather than romantic, cathedral instrument.

=== Nave Organ ===
Source: Details of the Nave Organ from the National Pipe Organ Register

The Nave Organ was a gift of the Poling Charitable Trust, the Nave Organ was built by Mander as part of the organ project in 1986. With one manual of six stops, plus a single pedal stop, the Nave Organ is designed to reinforce the presence of the main organ in the nave, or for use in its own right for in the "nave-only" services. The Nave Organ can be played either from its own console downstairs, or direct from the main organ.

=== Walker Organ ===
Source: Details of the Walker Organ from the National Pipe Organ Register

The Walker Organ, built in 1980, is a continuo instrument of one manual (no pedals) containing six stops and an integral blower. It is usually housed in the Lady chapel, and accompanies services held in that part of the cathedral. It is, however, readily moveable and is frequently used for concerts of baroque music in the nave.

=== Hurdis Organ ===
Source: Details of the Hurdis Organ from the National Pipe Organ Register

The Hurdis Organ was built c.1780 at least partly by the Reverend James Hurdis, who was headmaster of the Prebendal School who went on to be Professor of Poetry at Oxford University. In 1947, the Hurdis family gave the organ to the Prebendal School who, in turn deposited it on loan to the cathedral. It is currently housed in the retrochoir, where it is regularly used to accompany services at the Shrine of St. Richard.

=== Allen Organ ===
The Allen Organ was brought into the cathedral in 1972, at the time when the main organ was abandoned, and was used to accompany all main services until 1986 when the main organ came back into use. Thereafter, the Allen Organ was repositioned in the triforium at the west end of the cathedral as a concert organ. It is one of the earliest digital electronic organs in this country and continues to play an important part in the provision for musical events in the cathedral.

== Organists ==
The Organist and Master of the Choristers is responsible for overseeing the music of the cathedral, including the training and direction of the cathedral choir. The Assistant Organist accompanies the choir and is required to deputise the responsibilities of the Organist and Master of the Choristers. Despite the title which implies that they assist an organist, the Assistant Organist spends the most time at the organ console. In common with nearly all cathedrals in the UK, Chichester appoints an organ scholar each year to take a share of the playing of services in the cathedral and the training of the probationers in the Prebendal School. The organ scholarship is a one-year non-renewable post usually held by someone in their gap year between school and university, or in the first couple of years after graduation.

=== Organists and Masters of the Choristers ===
Organist (1545–1801)

- 1545 William Campion
- 1550 Thomas Coring
- 1560 Edward Piper
- 1561 Thomas Coring
- 1565 Michael Woods
- 1571 Clement Woodcock
- 1589 ?
- 1599 Jacob Hillarye
- 1602 Thomas Weelkes
- 1623 William Eames
- 1636 Thomas Lewis
- 1642 None (Note: The sacking of the cathedral in December 1642 caused all cathedral services to be suspended. They were not resumed until the restoration of the monarchy in 1661. The choir was re-formed in the same year, but the appointment of a new organist did not occur until 1668)
- 1668 Bartholomew Webb
- 1673 Thomas Lewis
- 1675 John Reading
- 1677 Samuel Peirson
- 1720 Thomas Kelway
- 1744 Thomas Capell
- 1776 William Walond Jr.

Master of the Choristers (1550s – 1801)

- 155? Richard Martyn
- 1558 William Payne
- 1562 Edward Piper
- 1568 William Payne
- 1571 Clement Woodcock
- 1580 Christopher Paine
- 1589 Clement Woodcock
- 1590 John Cowper
- 1597 Thomas Lambert
- 1599 Jacob Hillarye
- 1602 Thomas Weelkes
- 1617 John Fidge
- 1642 None
- 1661 John Floud
- 1662 George Hush
- 1668 Bartholomew Webb
- 1673 John Turner
- 1675 John Reading
- 1677 ?
- 1732 Thomas Capell
- 1771 Thomas Tremain
- 1775 William Walond Jr.
- 1794 Thomas Barber

Organist and Master of the Choristers (1801 – present)

- 1801 James Target
- 1803 Thomas Bennett
- 1848 Henry R. Bennett
- 1861 Philip Armes
- 1863 Edward Thorne
- 1870 Francis Edward Gladstone
- 1873 James Pyne
- 1874 Charles Henry Hylton Stewart
- 1875 Daniel Wood
- 1876 Theodore Aylward
- 1887 Frederick Read
- 1902 Frederick Crowe
- 1921 Frederick Read
- 1925 Marmaduke Conway
- 1931 Harvey Grace
- 1938 Horace Hawkins
- 1958 John Birch
- 1980 Alan Thurlow
- 2008 Sarah Baldock
- 2014 Charles Harrison

=== Assistant Organists ===
- 18?? Wharton Hooper
- 1864 ?
- 1876 Edward Bartlett
- 1887 Hugh Percy Allen
- 1892 Percy Algernon Whitehead
- 1908 William Herbert H. Lambert
- 1911 R. Swanborough
- 1915 Cyril Herbert Stone
- 1920 ?
- 1931 John Edward Snelling-Colyer
- 1932 Leonard Fergus O’Connor
- 1936 Claude Appleby
- 1942 Anne Maddocks
- 1949 ?
- 1961 Richard Seal
- 1968 Michael Davey
- 1971 Nicholas Cleobury
- 1973 Ian Fox
- 1978 Richard Cock
- 1980 Kenneth Sweetman
- 1981 Jeremy Suter
- 1991 James Thomas
- 1997 Mark Wardell
- 2010 Timothy Ravalde

=== Organ Scholars ===
- 1977 Richard R. Webster
- 1979 Kenneth Sweetman
- 1982 Simon Dinsdale
- 1988 Andrew Johnstone
- 1992 Mark Purcell
- 1993 Neil Cockburn
- 1994 Benjamin Nicholas
- 1995 David Soar
- 1996 Nicholas Chalmers
- 1997 Christopher Denton
- 1998 Luke Bartlett
- 1999 Marcus Wibberley
- 2000 Deirdre Comerford
- 2001 Edmund Aldhouse
- 2002 Ian Roberts
- 2003 Jamie Hutchings
- 2004 Sebastian Thompson
- 2005 Matthew Pitts
- 2006 John Mountford
- 2007 Colin Gray
- 2008 Julian Haggett
- 2009 John Dilworth
- 2010 Paul Manley
- 2011 Alex Goodwin
- 2012 Ben Cunningham
- 2013 Leonard Sanderman
- 2014 Tomek Pieczora
- 2015 Laura Erel
- 2016 George Barrett
- 2017 Kyoko Canaway
- 2018 Mitchell Farquharson
- 2019 Harry Spencer
- 2020 Thomas Howell
- 2022 Tim Stewart
- 2023 Thomas Simpson
- 2024 Stephanie Gaunt
- 2025 Ben Tanner
- 2026 Christopher Reid

== See also ==
- Chichester Cathedral
- List of musicians at English cathedrals
- Choir of Chichester Cathedral

== Sources ==
- N. Plumley and J. Lees, The Organs and Organists of Chichester Cathedral (Phillimore, 1988)
- W. B. Henshaw, Biographical Dictionary of the Organ 2003–2012
- ExLibris, Early English Musick 1385–1714 1998–2008
