= William Walond =

William Walond may refer to:

- William Walond Sr. (1719–1768), English composer and organist
- William Walond Jr. (1750–1836), English organist
