= Kenneth Sweetman =

Kenneth Jay Sweetman (born 1953) is an organist currently based in the United States. He was born in Paterson, New Jersey, and graduated from Calvin College and the University of Michigan.

== Career ==
Sweetman became Assistant Organist of Chichester Cathedral in 1980, working with both John Birch and his successor, Alan Thurlow. He left Chichester in 1981. He has been Director of Music of Mariners' Church, Detroit, Michigan since 1982. Sweetman has also given numerous recitals in churches across Michigan and in the Great Lakes region of the Midwestern United States, in addition to many recitals around the UK.

In addition to his work as an organist, choir director and recitalist, Sweetman has also worked with the Toledo Ohio firm of D.F. Pilzecker and Company, Organ Builders, participating in the building or rebuilding of several important organs the Detroit area.

== See also ==
- Organs and organists of Chichester Cathedral

Cultural offices
Preceded by Richard Cock	Assistant Organist of Chichester Cathedral; 1980-1981	Succeeded by Jeremy Suter
