= Stuart Nicholson =

Stuart Nicholson may refer to:

- Stuart Nicholson (footballer) (born 1987), English footballer
- Stuart Nicholson (jazz historian) (born 1948), British jazz historian, biographer, music journalist, music critic, and academic
- Stuart Nicholson (organist) (born 1975), English organist
- Stuart Nicholson (Royal Navy officer) (1865–1936), Royal Navy officer who achieved the rank of Admiral
- Stuart Nicholson (singer), English singer with the progressive rock band Galahad

== See also ==
- Wilmot Stuart Nicholson (1872–1947), Royal Navy officer who became Chief of the Submarine Service
