= Heyshott =

Village and parish in West Sussex, England

Coordinates: 50.95563°N 0.72392°W

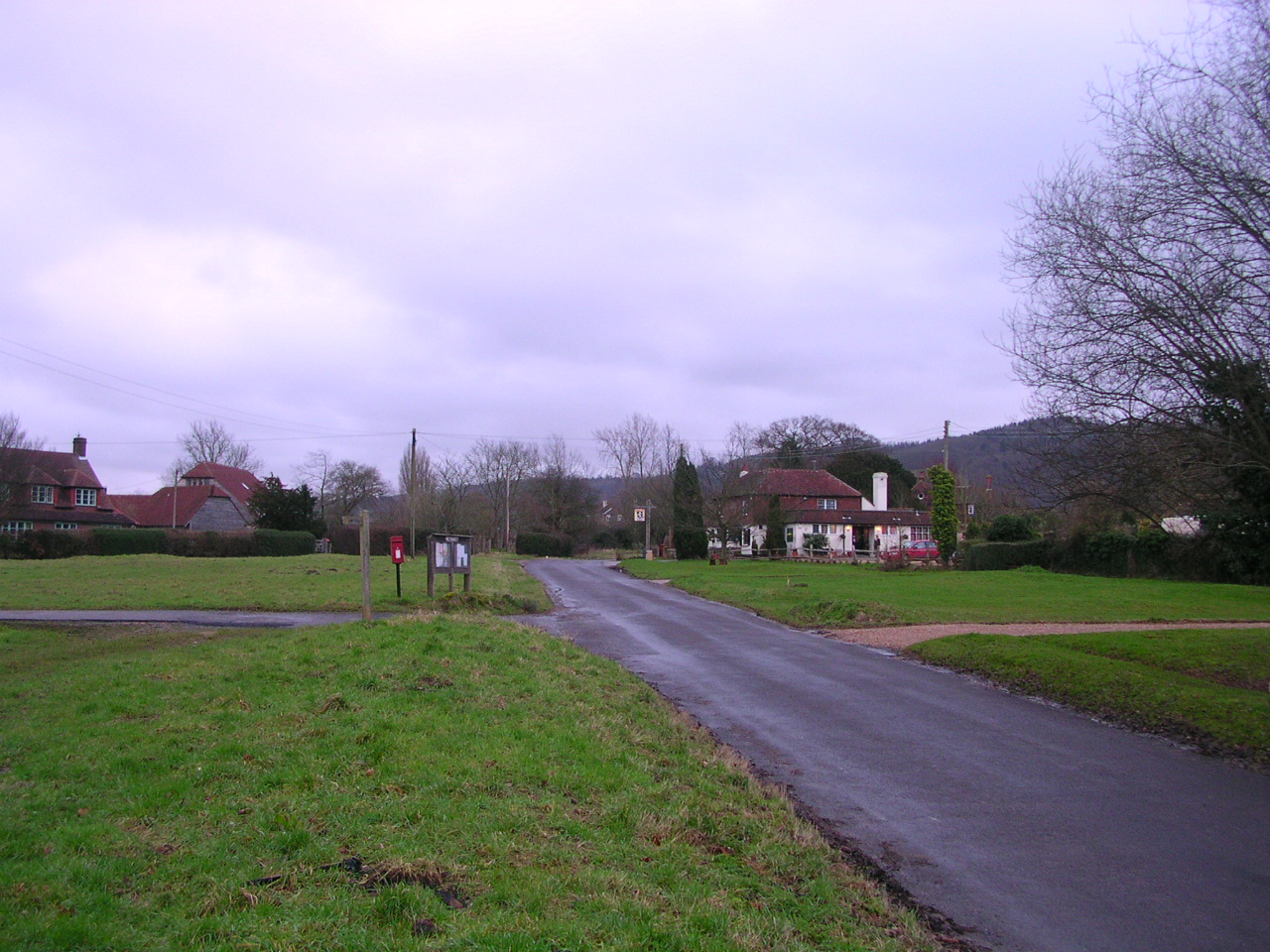
- Heyshott Green and the Unicorn Inn

- Location within West Sussex
- Area: 9.38 km^{2} (3.62 sq mi)
- Population: 270. 2011 Census
  - Density: 33/km^{2} (85/sq mi)
- OS grid reference: SU897181
  - London: 46 miles (74 km) NE
- Civil parish: Heyshott
- District: Chichester
- Shire county: West Sussex
- Region: South East
- Country: England
- Sovereign state: United Kingdom
- Post town: MIDHURST
- Postcode district: GU29
- Dialling code: 01730
- Police: Sussex
- Fire: West Sussex
- Ambulance: South East Coast
- UK Parliament: Chichester

Heyshott is a village, Anglican parish and civil parish in the Chichester district of West Sussex, England. It is approximately three miles south of Midhurst and lies within the South Downs National Park. Like many villages it has lost its shop but still has one pub, The Unicorn Inn. The hamlet of Hoyle is to the northeast of the village.

== History ==
In the reign of Henry VIII (1509-1547), the manor was associated with Petworth, and in the 19th century was the property of Lord Leconfield.

== Civil parish ==
In the 2001 census the parish covered 938 hectares (2316 acres) and had 131 households with a total population of 309 of whom 137 residents were economically active. The 2011 Census population was 270.

== Anglican parish ==
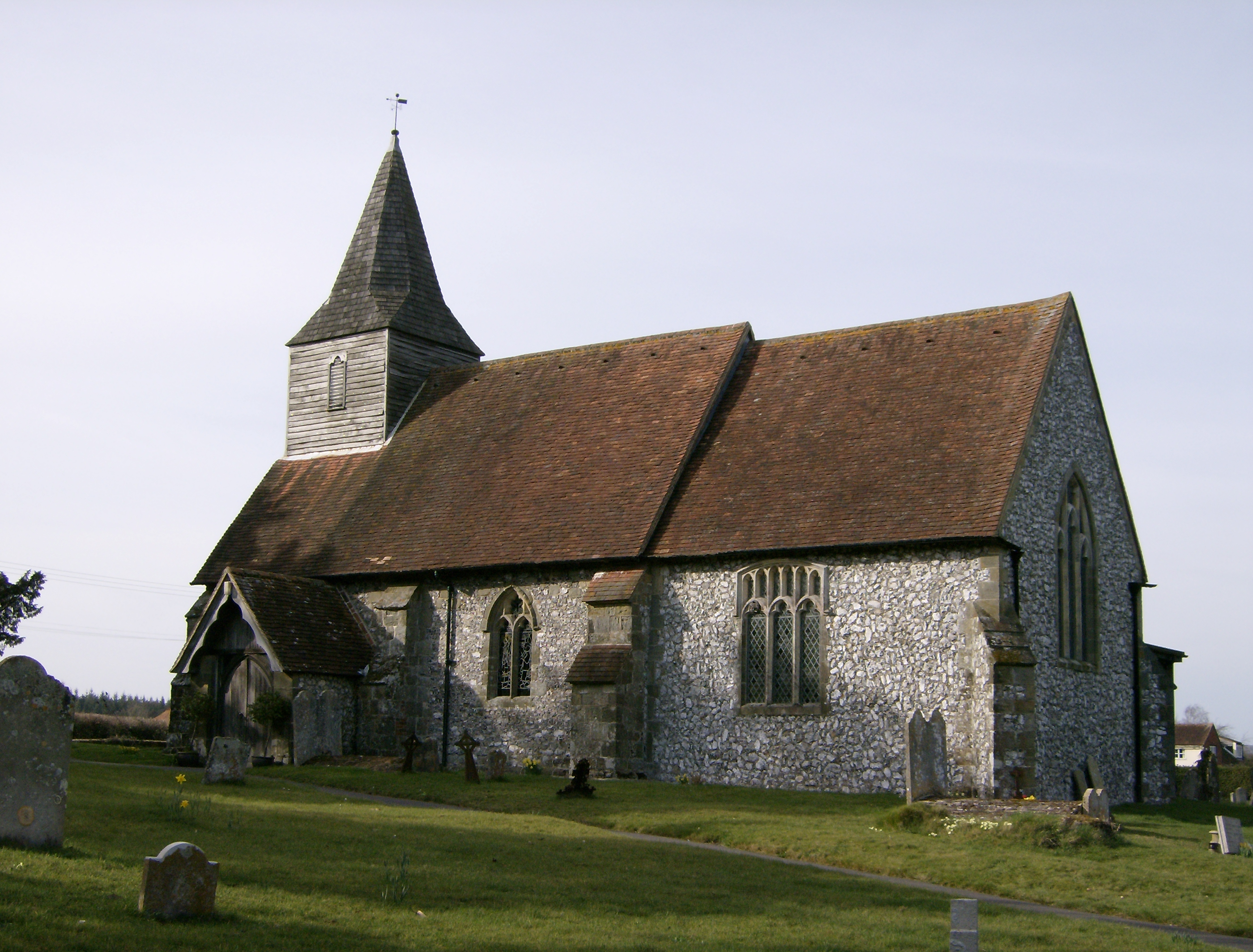
St James's Church

The Anglican parish church is dedicated to St James the Great. Bishop Morris Maddocks is buried at the local church, alongside his wife Anne.

Parish records date back to 1690.

The area of the parish in the mid-19th century was 2,171 acres (879 ha) and the parish population was 396.

== Features and events ==
Heyshott holds an annual bonfire and firework display, which is held on a Saturday evening close to 5 November, from 7pm.

It also gives its name to the nearby site, "Heyshott Down Nature Reserve" - which is found just to the south of the village. The reserve is an SSSI (site of special scientific interest) containing neolithic and Bronze Age earthworks on a chalk grassland. The reserve offers a view over the village and a large portion of the south-western Weald.

There is a large number of listed buildings in and around the village, including the church, many cottages and a telephone kiosk.

== Notable people ==
- Richard Cobden (1804-1865), English manufacturer, politician and trade activist, lived at Dunford House, a Grade II listed building; a former pub in Cocking was named after him.
- Anne Maddocks (1911-2006), organist
- General Frank Messervy (1893-1973), general in the British Army in WW2
