= Battle of Muster Green =

Battle of the First English Civil War

Coordinates: 50.9998°N 0.1092°W

- Part of the First English Civil War
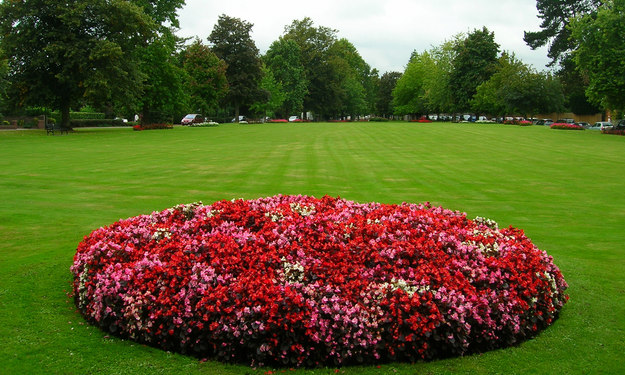
- Muster Green (the site of the battle) in 2007
Date	First week of December 1642
Location	Muster Green, Haywards Heath, West Sussex
Result	Parliamentarian victory

Belligerents
Royalists	Parliamentarians

Commanders and leaders
Edward Ford; Earl of Thanet	Herbert Morley

Strength
~ 1,000 foot 100 dragoons	~ 250 foot and horse

Casualties and losses
200 killed, wounded, or captured	Unknown (Note: It could be assumed that the Parliamentarian casualties were much less than that of the Royalist casualties due to the approximate size of the parliamentarian army being almost the same size as the total number of Royalist casualties.)

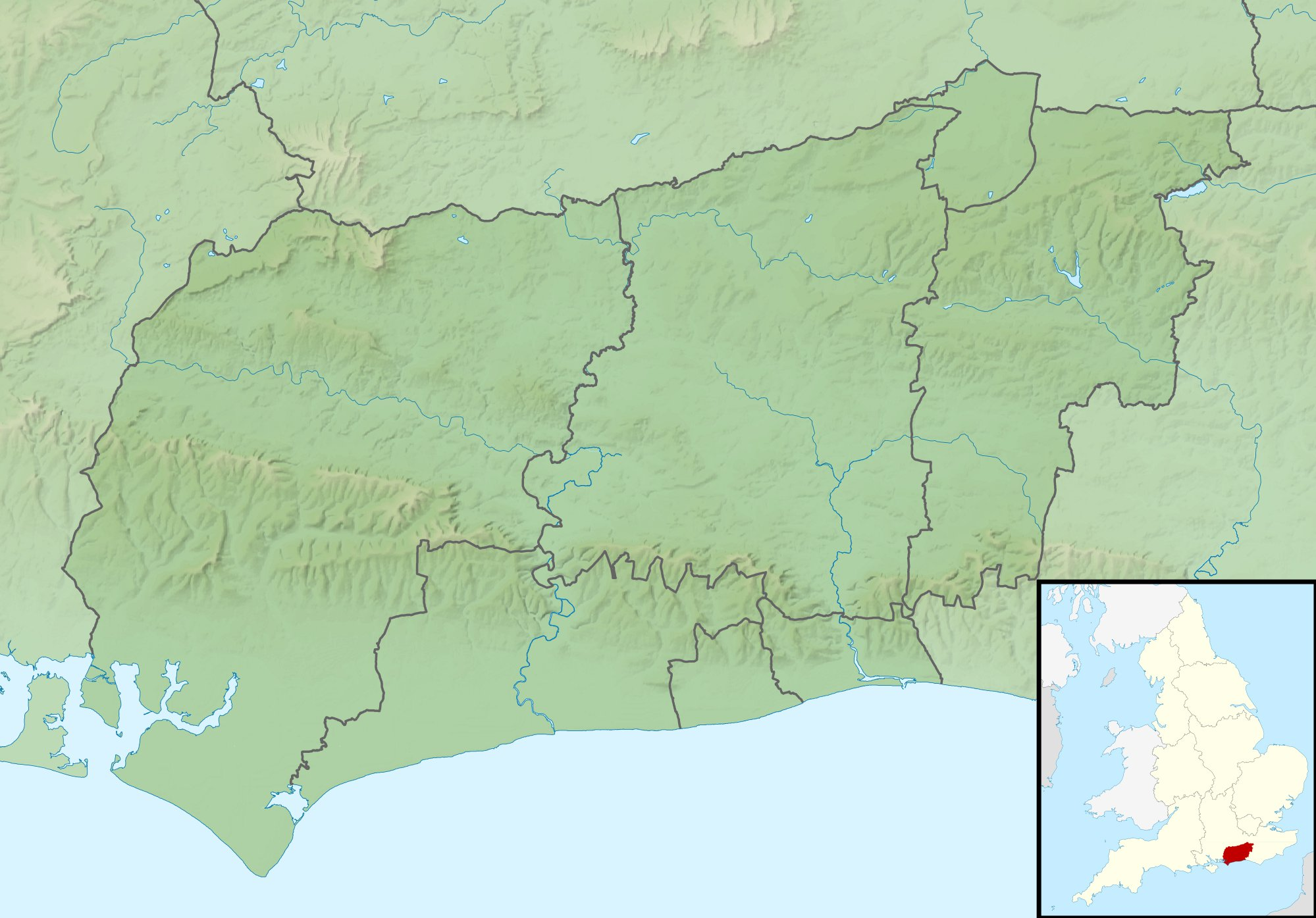
Battle site (in yellow) in relation to Chichester, Wiston House, Cuckfield, and Lewes, within Sussex

The Battle of Muster Green (also known as the Battle of Haywards Heath) was a minor battle of major significance that took place during the first week of December 1642 on and around the then much larger Muster Green in Haywards Heath during the first year of the First English Civil War. A Royalist army under Colonel Edward Ford, High Sheriff of Sussex, marching from Chichester to seize Lewes for the King encountered a smaller but more disciplined Parliamentarian army under Colonel Herbert Morley waiting for them on Muster Green.

After Royalist musketeers fired "some" volleys, Morley's cavalry broke through the Royalist's advanced guard and, with the Parliamentarian infantry charging simultaneously, fought hand-to-hand; at least an hour of fighting ensued in which 200 Royalists were killed, wounded, or captured, resulting in the surviving Royalist forces' routing and the Parliamentarians emerging victorious, saving Lewes from a Royalist assault, and pushing back Ford's 1642 Royalist invasion of Sussex. The battle site of the Battle of Muster Green became and remained the furthest any large Royalist force advanced through Sussex during the English Civil Wars.

== Background ==
At the beginning of the First English Civil War there was no obvious distinction by location, occupation, or social class that outlined who would declare their support for the Royalists and who would declare support for the Parliamentarians in Sussex. Although historians have tried to characterise the eastern half of the county as "staunchly Parliamentarian" and western parts as more sympathetic to the Royalist cause, this broad distinction obscures many localised variations, particularly in downland areas and some urban areas. For example, in Chichester, the church, gentry, and upper classes made clear their support was for Charles I while the rising merchant classes showed their sympathies lay with the Parliamentarians. The people of poorer standing, while making up the majority of the population, were much less eager to take up the cause of either side.

It was soon clear that neither Royalists nor Parliamentarians would have control of Sussex without the use of force via a military campaign through the county. Sussex was of strategic and industrial importance to both sides during the war due to the cannon foundries and ironworks making up the Wealden iron industry in the High Weald, controlling which would have given a logistical advantage to the side that controlled them, and also because the Sussex coastline was one of the shortest routes to France – potentially a source of smuggled arms, gunpowder, troops, and bullion, as well as other equipment and materials required to wage and win a civil war. The proximity to France also meant the county could be used as an escape route by the King – another factor which made Sussex "a region that Parliament needed to keep under firm control".

In wider context, when the King fled to Oxford in August 1642 after he raised his royal standard in Nottingham and officially started the First English Civil War, he held the north of England, most of the Midlands, the south west of England, and Wales. This meant that it was mostly obvious where strong Royalist support began and ended and, with Sussex, part of this 'front line' was at the boundary with itself and Hampshire (even though Hampshire was mostly sympathetic to Parliament, the Royalists held many isolated strongholds in the county such as Portsmouth, Basing House, and Winchester). Edward Ford, the Royalist leader at the battle, had been given a colonel's commission at the outbreak of war by Charles, who also made Ford the High Sheriff of Sussex in 1642. Ford offered his majesty "a thousand men, and to undertake the conquest of Sussex, though sixty miles in length" and began to raise forces accordingly. On 18 November 1642, Ford marched his Royalist army from Hampshire across the border with, and into, Sussex, whereupon he seized Chichester for the King. Ford then set his eyes on Lewes.

== Prelude ==
Ford decided that he would lead his forces eastwards through Sussex and seize the important Sussex town of Lewes for the King. Ford marched his forces in a broad sweep of Sussex – not heading directly along the coast from Chichester to Lewes but instead heading in a north-east direction to then move on Lewes from the north. Why Ford did this is unknown but it could have been to deliberately prolong his advance through Sussex and to Lewes to allow Ford to forcibly conscript more locals along the way, with the use of threats and force if need be, in order to swell his army (albeit with untrained rural folk) for his assault on Lewes. Either way, this decision eventually led Ford and his army to Cuckfield (roughly 11 miles (18 km) to the north west of Lewes) where he and his army set up camp. During the first week of December, Ford led his army out of Cuckfield and continued eastwards (probably marching down the modern Cuckfield-Haywards Heath route consisting of Broad Street, Tylers Green, and the B2272) and towards Haywards Heath.

Haywards Heath would have been very different then from what it is today, as Haywards Heath as a large settlement is a relatively modern development kickstarted by the arrival of the London & Brighton Railway in 1841. In 1642, Haywards Heath mostly consisted of enclosed fields and copses with only a few houses and farms present being dotted about the landscape. There may well have been a small handful of buildings involved in the battle, including a building adjacent to the westernmost point of Muster Green called "Hen Davis House" in 1638. On arriving at the western outskirts of Haywards Heath, Ford and his army were met by resistance in the form of a much smaller but more disciplined Parliamentarian force led by Colonel Herbert Morley, which was waiting for them on Muster Green.

== Battle ==
The exact size of the Royalist army is unknown, however, Ford offered to fight for the King with "a thousand men, and to undertake the conquest of Sussex" so it is possible that the size of the Royalist army at Muster Green could have been circa 1,000 in size. The exact size of the Parliamentarian army is also unknown, although, it is known that they were outnumbered by at least four to one by the royalist army meaning that the Parliamentarian force possibly numbered at circa 250 – what Morley's men lacked in numbers however, they made up for in discipline, being therefore a more effective fighting force than that of Ford's. Later research by historians has pointed to the fact that neither side possessed any artillery at the battle. A recorded Parliamentarian perspective of the battle survives, likely being from the "news" that reached London on 8 December of Morley's victory at Haywards Heath:

The fight was performed with their muskets at first, and after some volleys our horse broke into their van, our footmen just at that instant charging courageously into their quarters.

The Parliamentarians fought with "great fierceness" in bloody hand-to-hand combat inflicting heavy casualties on the less disciplined Royalists; Morley then sent his reserves up to exploit this and completed the rout of Ford's army. The fighting lasted for roughly an hour and resulted in at least 200 Royalists killed, wounded, or captured, while the figure for the Parliamentarian casualties is unknown. Ford's forcibly conscripted locals, recruited during Ford's broad sweep of Western Sussex, broke first, threw down their arms, and dispersed into the surrounding countryside; Ford and Thanet soon fled with their cavalry back to Chichester, leaving their surviving infantry (who had now scattered) to fend for themselves. The battle ended with the Royalists routed, retreating and dispersing from the battlefield – the Parliamentarians had decisively won the battle and spared Lewes from a Royalist assault.

== Aftermath ==
=== Subsequent events ===
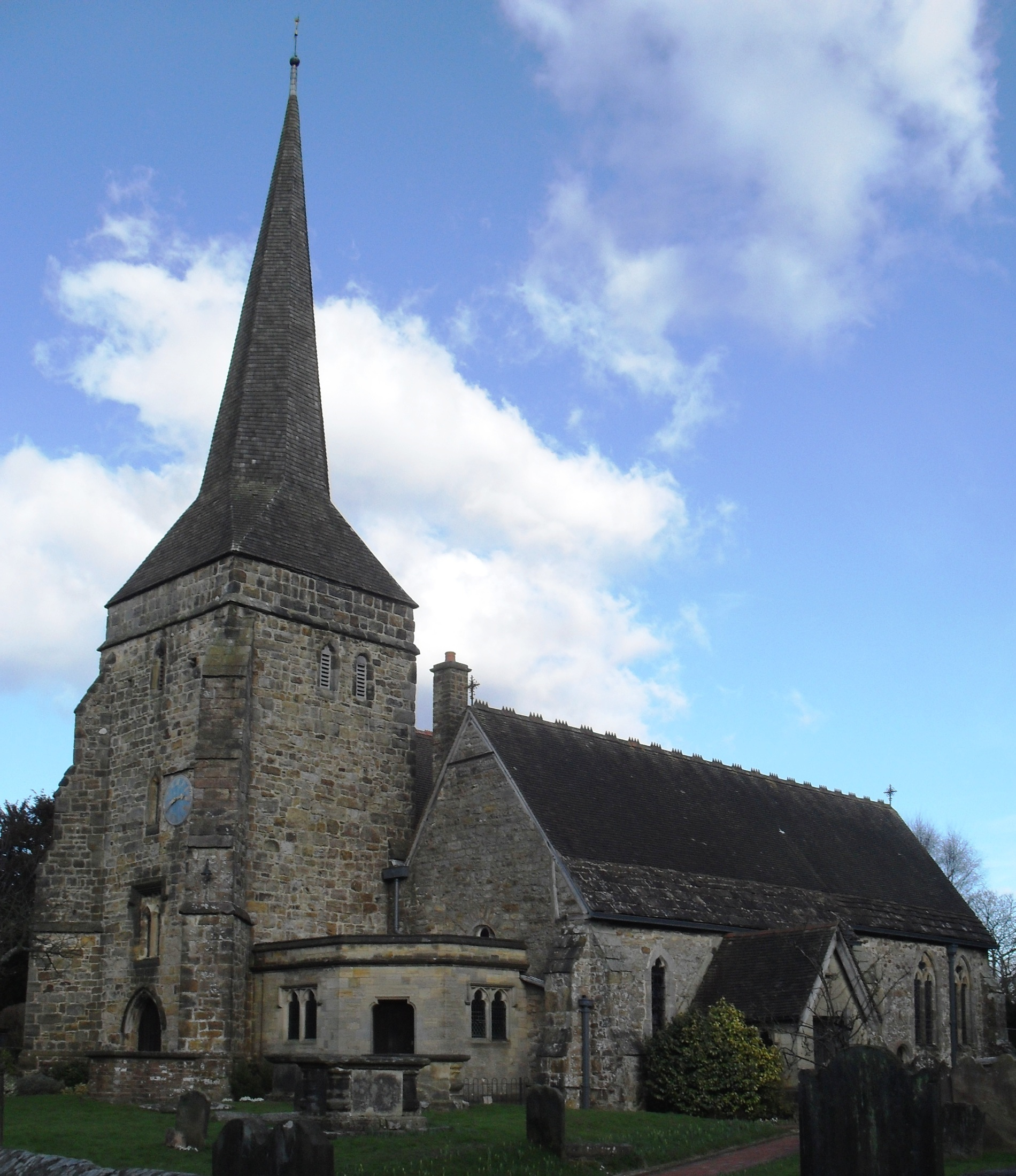
St Margaret's Church, West Hoathly, it is hypothesised that after the battle a routed group of Royalists fled into this church while under fire

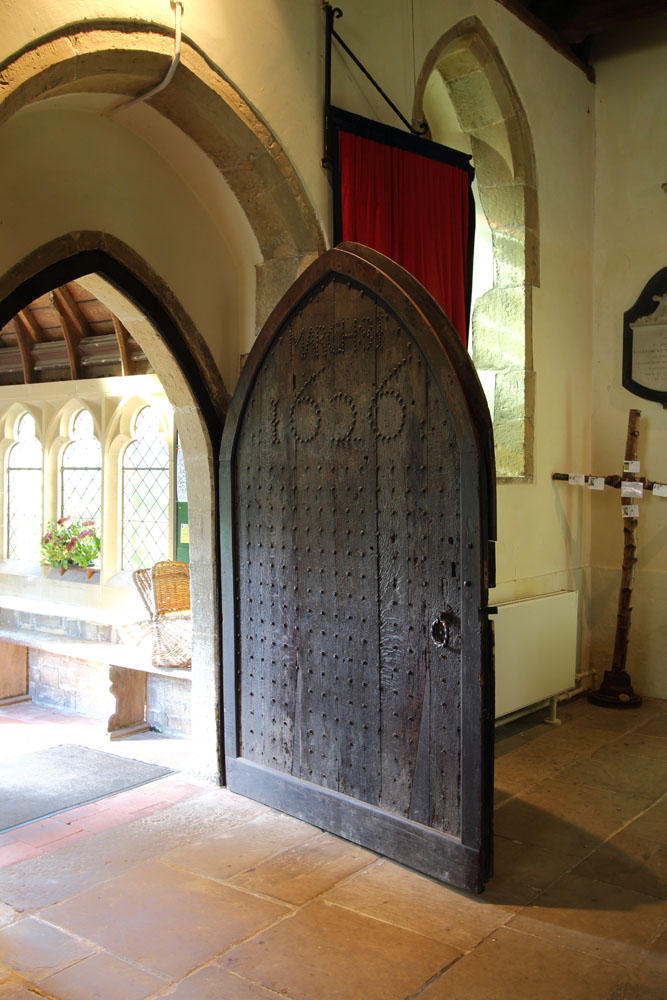
The door in St Margaret's Church ridden with suspected musket ball holes

After the battle, the Royalists were routed and driven from the battlefield – the battle site of the Battle of Muster Green became and remained the furthest a Royalist army advanced through Sussex during the First English Civil War. The forcibly conscripted locals were the first to break and were routed, fleeing southwards to Ditchling, Hurstpierpoint, and other neighbouring villages. Concurrently, the defeated Ford "conveyed himself away and left his men in the lurch to shift for themselves", then Ford in the company of Thanet, his officers, and their cavalry "flying with all speed up to the not distant downs, and so to Wissum ("Wissum" being a misspelling of Wiston) to the Earl's house", ("the Earl's house" being Wiston House which was later occupied by Royalist forces and then by Parliamentarian forces) and then from there back to the previously captured city of Chichester, where they, among others, were later besieged that December during a siege by the Parliamentarians under Sir William Waller and taken prisoner after the Royalist resistance surrendered on 27 December 1642. News of the Parliamentarian victory at Haywards Heath reached London on 8 December.

It is hypothesised by historian Philip Pavey, based on a local oral tradition his father had heard, that a group of routed Royalist stragglers retreated in a north easterly direction while being pursued by Parliamentarians and ended up 6 miles (9.7 km) north east of Muster Green in West Hoathly. Here, Pavey describes how the retreating Royalists fled for safety into St Margaret's Church whereupon slamming the door shut behind them, they came under fire from Parliamentarian musketeers – the lead musket balls impacted the heavy wooden door to the church leaving half a dozen semiglobular impact marks "roughly about the size of Maltesers" and are still visible on the outside facing surface of the door today, although smoothed and shined with age like the rest of the door, and are the basis of this hypothesis along with the oral tradition. What happened to these Royalists inside St Margaret's Church if they were ever there is not known, however the impact marks on the door suggests that the Royalists were unwilling to immediately surrender, but the lack of greater documentation surrounding this event also suggests they eventually would have without further violence, probably being given quarter as was the custom at the time and thus sparing a massacre in the church. It is therefore theoretically not hard to believe that such a contemporarily un-notable event would only survive through oral tradition rather than being documented at the time.

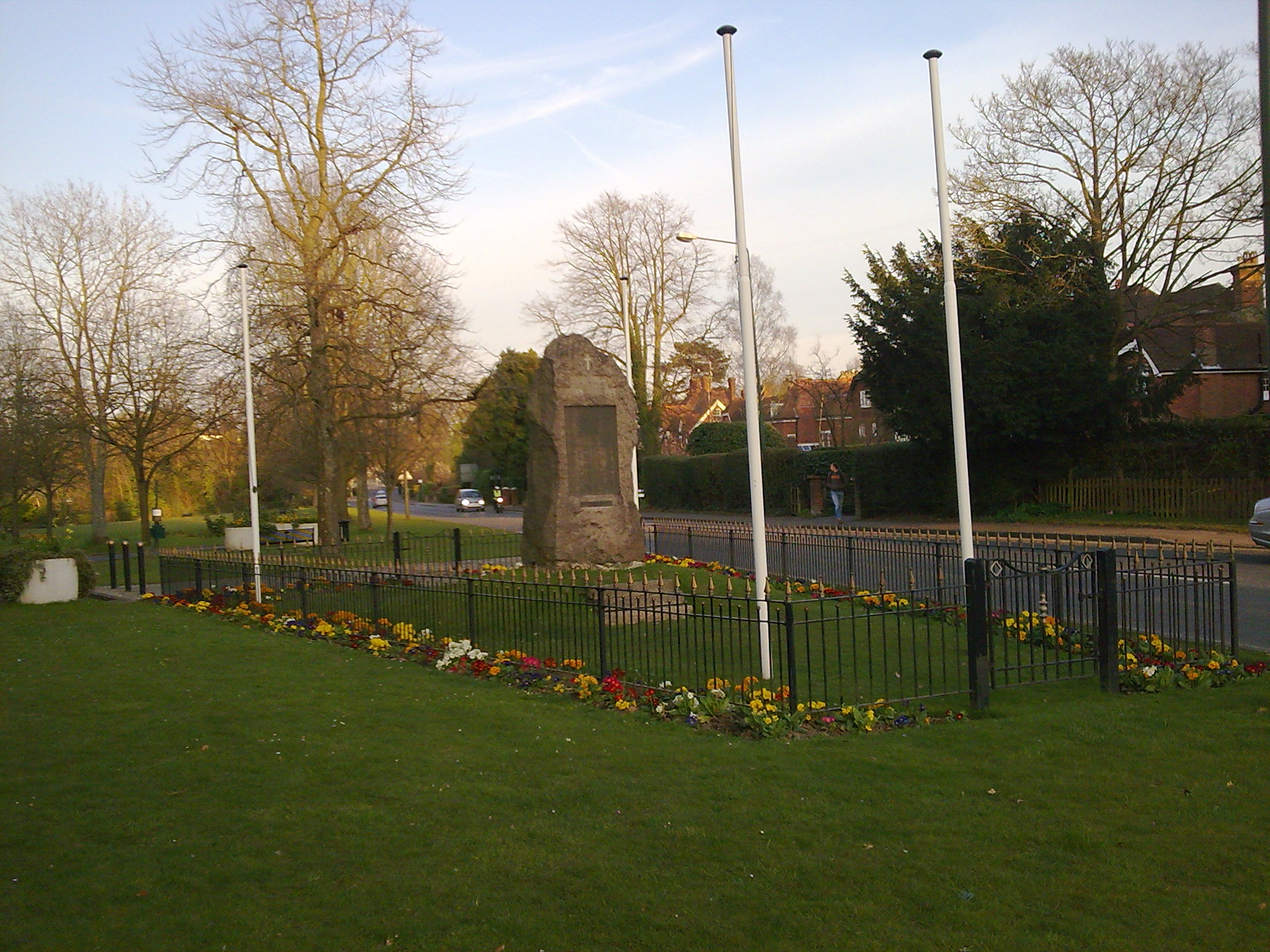
Haywards Heath war memorial in 2009, situated on the westernmost edge of Muster Green, the direction from which Ford's Royalist army approached

=== Battle site today ===
The surrounding area of the site of the battle has changed and developed significantly since the time of the battle in 1642. Muster Green can be made out on the 1638 Manorial Map of Great Haywards Demesne and is surrounded by fields but little development. With the coming of the London & Brighton Railway in 1841, Haywards Heath began to urbanise exponentially and Muster Green saw itself slowly encroached upon by newer and newer buildings. Today, Muster Green is completely enveloped by urban sprawl, however, its shape has not changed as historically it was a green space between two diverging roads (the B2272 in the south and Muster Green North in the north). Muster Green nowadays is a well maintained village green and has been awarded the Green Flag Award numerous times for being "one of the very best in the world". Haywards Heath war memorial is also located on the westernmost point of the green. An informative and commemorative plaque on a lectern is situated on the easternmost point of the green describing the Battle of Muster Green. This was installed by the local council at the recommendation of historian Philip Pavey in June 2015, although, the plaque commemorates the Battle of Muster Green as the Battle of Haywards Heath.
