= Thomas Lewis (organist) =

English organist

Thomas Lewis (died 1674) was an English organist.

== Career ==
Lewis succeeded William Eames as Organist of Chichester Cathedral in 1636. After a five-day siege in December 1642, Cicestrian cavaliers surrendered to William Waller's forces. As the city had fallen to the puritan movement sweeping the country during the First English Civil War, all choral services were suspended. Lewis did not resume his post at the Restoration in 1661 - Bartholomew Webb became Organist in 1668.

Lewis succeeded Webb in 1673, after a one-year probationary period. He died in the following July.

== See also ==
- Organs and organists of Chichester Cathedral

== Notes ==
- The sacking of the cathedral in December 1642 caused all cathedral services to be suspended. They were not resumed until the restoration of the monarchy in 1661. The choir was re-formed in the same year, but the appointment of a new organist did not occur until 1668, when Bartholomew Webb took up the post.

Cultural offices
| Preceded by William Eames | Organist of Chichester Cathedral; 1636-1643 | Succeeded by None^{a} |
| Preceded by Bartholomew Webb | Organist of Chichester Cathedral; 1673-1674 | Succeeded by John Reading |
