= Bartholomew Webb =

English organist

Bartholomew Webb (born 1650) was an English organist.

== Career ==
Webb was a chorister at Winchester Cathedral until 1666. He was appointed Organist of Chichester Cathedral in August 1668. He was also Master of the Choristers two months later.

== See also ==
- Organs and organists of Chichester Cathedral

== Notes ==
- The last appointment as Organist prior to the suspension of cathedral services was Thomas Lewis

Cultural offices
Preceded by None^{a}	Organist of Chichester Cathedral; 1668-1673	Succeeded by Thomas Lewis
Preceded by George Hush	Master of the Choristers of Chichester Cathedral; 1668-1673	Succeeded by John Turner
