= Thomas Coring =

English organist

Thomas Coring (dates unknown) was an English organist.

== Career ==
Coring was a Lay Vicar of Chichester Cathedral. He was employed as the Organist from midsummer 1550 and is thought to have been replaced by 1557, as the cathedral records list him as a singer. He resumed his position in 1561.

== See also ==
- Organs and organists of Chichester Cathedral

Cultural offices
Preceded by William Campion	Organist of Chichester Cathedral; 1550-1557	Succeeded by Edward Piper
Preceded by Edward Piper	Organist of Chichester Cathedral; 1561-1565	Succeeded by Michael Woods
