= Thomas Capell =

English organist

Thomas Capell (died 1776) was an English organist.

== Career ==
Capell was master of the choristers of Chichester Cathedral during Thomas Kelway's tenure as organist, since 1732. Following Kelway's death in 1744, Capell was admitted organist on probation – he resigned the position of master of the choristers in the same year and was confirmed officially in October 1747.

Due to failing health, Capell deferred his duties to his deputy organist: Richard Hall in 1765, Thomas Tremain in 1771 and William Walond Jr. in 1775. However, he retained his title and stipend as organist until his death.

== See also ==
- Organs and organists of Chichester Cathedral

Cultural offices
Preceded by Thomas Kelway	Organist of Chichester Cathedral; 1744-1776	Succeeded by William Walond Jr.
Preceded by ?	Master of the Choristers of Chichester Cathedral; 1732-1744	Succeeded by Thomas Tremain
