= A Healing House of Prayer =

- Author: Morris Maddocks
- Genre: A Selection of Daily Readings
- Publisher: Hodder & Stoughton
- Publication date: 1987
- Publication place: United Kingdom
- ISBN: 0-340-41036-1 (Hardback reprint); ISBN 978-0-340-41036-3 (Hardback 1st ed)
- OCLC: 59145685
- Followed by: Prayers for the sick

A Healing House of Prayer contains daily readings for a month, each day covering a different theme. In addition readings for feast days and holy days are included with a number devoted to various aspects of healing.

An example:

C. S. Lewis said:

'Praise is inner health made audible'
