= Jacob Hillarye =

English organist

Jacob Hillarye (died 1632) was an English organist.

== Career ==
Hillarye was a Lay Vicar at Chichester Cathedral from 1590. He was appointed to the office of both Organist and Master of the Choristers in 1599. He was succeeded by Thomas Weelkes in 1602. He remained a choirman until at least 1616 and was landlord of the King's Head public house (now called Trents) in South Street, Chichester.

== See also ==
- Organs and organists of Chichester Cathedral

Cultural offices
Preceded by Thomas Lambert	Master of the Choristers of Chichester Cathedral; 1599-1602	Succeeded by Thomas Weelkes
Preceded by ?	Organist of Chichester Cathedral; 1599-1602	Succeeded by Thomas Weelkes
