= Morris Maddocks =

English Anglican bishop

Morris Maddocks

Morris Henry St John Maddocks (28 April 1928 – 19 January 2008) was a bishop in the Church of England.

He was a leading proponent of healing ministry and an assistant bishop in the Diocese of Chichester from 1987. He died on 19 January 2008.

Morris served in parishes in London and York before being consecrated as a bishop and founding the Acorn Christian Healing Trust, now the Acorn Christian Healing Foundation, with his wife Anne. He was the author of The Christian Healing Ministry, published in 1981.

== Life ==
Morris Henry St John Maddocks was born in 1928, the son of a West Yorkshire priest. He was educated at St John's School, Leatherhead, and gained an MA at Trinity College, Cambridge.

A keen sportsman, his military service was in the Duke of Wellington's Regiment, Royal Signals and Royal Army Service Corps. Rugby and cricket were his great interests.

He trained for the ordained ministry at Chichester Theological College in 1952, then was ordained a deacon in 1954 and priest in 1955, serving curacies at St Peter's Church, Ealing and in Uxbridge up to 1958.

He married Anne Sheail at Chichester Cathedral, where she was the assistant organist, on 22 September 1955. Anne was such a support in her husband's work that some priests would pray for "Morris and Anne, our Bishop."

He then moved to York, where he was Vicar of Weaverthorpe, Helperthorpe, and Luttons Ambo. From 1961 to 1971 he was Vicar of St Martin-on-the-Hill, Scarborough. During this time he served as chaplain to the Black and White Minstrels and made many other visits to the Futurist Theatre. Nine members of the cast of the Black and White Minstrels were confirmed at the church and George Mitchell, who looked after the Minstrels, went to have tea at the vicarage. Around that time, Songs of Praise was broadcast live from St Martin's.

In 1972, Morris was appointed the suffragan Bishop of Selby, where he remained until 1983. He was known during this time for, among other things, ministering in the Selby coalfields.

His experience in the church began when five laypeople visited him at St Martin's, Scarborough, in 1963 and together they prayed for the healing of the sick. His key understanding of Christian healing was, "Jesus Christ meeting you at the point of your deepest need."

His first book, The Christian Healing Ministry, was published in 1981. Others followed, including Journey into Wholeness (1986), Questions about Healing (1988), A Healing House of Prayer (1987), and The Vision of Dorothy Kerin (1991).

Morris and Anne found themselves overwhelmed with requests to preach about Christian healing after the publication of The Christian Healing Ministry, and the Archbishop of York sent Morris on sabbatical, but on their return to work, he was given an unpaid appointment as special adviser on health and healing to the Archbishop of Canterbury, and the Archbishop of York from 1983 to 1995.

In 1983, Morris was appointed as assistant bishop to the Bishop of Bath and Wells, a post he held up to 1987.

It was around this time that the couple were offered a building – Whitehill Chase in Bordon, Hampshire – plus annual funding for the work of Christian healing. This saw the genesis of the Acorn Christian Healing Foundation. The foundation, co-founded by Morris, now operates remotely across the UK with Acorn Christian Healing Hubs.

After his retirement, the couple returned to Chichester, living in the cathedral's close and attending cathedral worship every day. Morris was invited to be an honorary assistant bishop in 1987. He was also a canon and prebendary of the cathedral (Bracklesham) from 1992 to 2003.

Anne died in October 2006 after a marriage of 51 years. The couple had no children. Bishop Morris continued to live in Canon Lane, and died in Southampton Hospital after complications following major heart surgery.

In paying tribute to his life and work, Bishop John William Hind, Bishop of Chichester commented:

Bishop Morris was like the apostle Barnabas – always an encourager. I thank God for his long, distinguished, and varied ministry. May he rest in peace.

The Dean of Chichester, the Very Revd Nicholas Frayling, added:

It is hard to imagine the Cathedral without Bishop Morris, with his gentle smile and faithful presence. He was one of the great figures in the Church of England in the 20th century.

Morris's funeral took place at Chichester Cathedral on 1 February 2008.

Church of England titles
Preceded by Douglas Noel Sargent	Bishop of Selby; 1972–1983	Succeeded by Clifford Conder Barker
