= Michael Woods (organist) =

English organist

Michael Woods (dates unknown) was an English organist.

== Career ==
Woods' musical career was centred at Chichester Cathedral where he served as Organist for four years, between 1565 and 1569. When he was succeeded by Clement Woodcock, he was admitted as a lay clerk. A number of manuscripts kept at the British Library and Royal College of Music are ascribed to 'Woods'.

== See also ==
- Organs and organists of Chichester Cathedral

Cultural offices
Preceded by Thomas Coring	Organist of Chichester Cathedral; 1565-1569	Succeeded by Clement Woodcock
