= Adrian Jack =

British composer (1943–2026)

Adrian Frederick Joseph Jack (16 March 1943 – June 2026) was a British composer.

== Life and career ==
Adrian Jack was born in Datchet, near Slough, Buckinghamshire, England, on 16 March 1943. He was educated at Merchant Taylors' School, Northwood (1954–1960), and began composing at the age of 13. At the Royal College of Music, London (1961–1964) he studied composition with Peter Racine Fricker, fugue and orchestration with Gordon Jacob, piano with Antony Hopkins and organ with John Birch. His contemporaries there included Roger Smalley and John White. From 1967 to 1969 he studied composition and electronic music with Włodzimierz Kotoński at the State Higher School of Music in Warsaw, Poland.

The main conscious influence at that time was Messiaen. Hearing Boulez's "Le marteau sans maitre" brought a new atonal complexity to his music, replaced by an austere paring-down following his discovery of Edgard Varèse. He actually wrote to Varèse to ask if he could study with him in New York and received a letter of refusal, not very long before Varèse died in November 1965.

He lectured at the Royal College from 1969 to 1977, then he joined BBC Radio 3 as a script-writer for music programmes. He left the BBC in 1993 and for the next ten years was active as a freelance music critic and producer. He devised and presented several radio programmes on music and architecture for BBC Radio 3 with the producers Tim Thorne and Antony Pitts. These included two sets of short documetaries on music theory (A Series of Intervals, 1996 and The Harmonic Series, 1998), as well as two notable examples of radiogenic work, "Chromatic Fantasy" (1994) and "From the Diary of a Fly" (1997).

He wrote about music regularly from 1970 for most of the quality national papers, notably The Guardian and, later, The Independent. His other main activity was as director of a series at the Institute of Contemporary Arts (ICA) in London, devoted to new music. It ran from 1978 to 1995.

== Composition ==
Jack composed somewhat intermittently from the 1960s into the 1980s. His works during this period include "Holly Bush", written in Poland and given a public rehearsal by the London Sinfonietta under Roger Norrington at the Queen Elizabeth Hall, London; a piano concerto for Roger Woodward (never performed); a monodic piece for any instruments or voices, "You told me so yourself", which received performances by different soloists and groups both in England and abroad; and "A piece for learning" – a "variable" score performed under Richard Bernas's direction at the Dartington Summer School.

In 1986 the American pianist Yvar Mikhashoff requested a tango ("Tin-Pan Tango") to perform at the Almeida Festival in London. This kick-started a revival in Jack's composition. Reacting against his own earlier music and most of the experimental or avant-garde music he promoted at the ICA, Jack now wrote music which was, broadly speaking, tonal, and in which the emphasis was on continuity and a sense of line. the ensemble pieces"Jigsaw" and "Notelette" were commissioned and performed by Sounds Positive, while "Zigzag" was requested and performed (including a broadcast on Radio 3) by Cambridge New Music Players (now known as "New Music Players"). His "Piano Trio" (the first of three works for the medium) was originally requested and performed by London New Music. Jack's first two string quartets were played and broadcast by The Smith Quartet, and the third, fourth, fifth and sixth recorded by the Arditti Quartet for the Deux-Elles.

Of over 50 solo piano pieces, many have been performed and broadcast by Noriko Kawai and Iain Burnside, and all of Jack's music for piano duo has been performed by the Danish-based duo, Ingryd Thorson and Julian Thurber. Many of his scores are lodged with the British Music Information Centre (BMIC) and recordings at the British Library Sound Archive.

== Final years ==
Owing to ill health Jack no longer composed in later years and withdrew from making public appearances. He died in June 2026, aged 83.
