= Clement Woodcock =

English organist and composer (1540–1590)

Clement Woodcock (died 1590) was an English organist.

== Career ==
After some years as a lay clerk of King's College, Cambridge between 1562 and 1563, Woodcock was a singer at Canterbury Cathedral before being appointed Organist of Chichester Cathedral from 1570. He was appointed Master of the Choristers in November 1571 and led a recruitment drive for new choristers. By April 1574, Woodcock was in Holy Orders. In 1580, he resigned the Mastership of the Choristers in favour of Christopher Paine; however, he returned to the post in the last year of his life.

== Compositions ==
Woodcock composed a total of five instrumental pieces of music (quintets for viols), four of which are dated 1578, in Chichester. They are pioneer compositions in the style later cultivated by William Byrd and other Tudor and Jacobean composers. He wrote three settings of In Nomine, one of which is found in the Dow Partbooks.

== List of works ==
- 1. Hackney a5
- 2. Browning my dear a5
- 3. In Nomine 1 a5
- 4. In Nomine 2 a5
- 5. In Nomine 3 a5

== See also ==
- Organs and organists of Chichester Cathedral
- 3 In Nomines

Cultural offices
| Preceded by Christopher Paine | Master of the Choristers of Chichester Cathedral; 1589-1590 | Succeeded by John Cowper |
| Preceded by William Payne | Master of the Choristers of Chichester Cathedral; 1571-1580 | Succeeded by Christopher Paine |
| Preceded by Michael Woods | Organist of Chichester Cathedral; 1570-1589 | Succeeded by ? |
