= Richard Seal =

English organist and conductor (1935–2022)

- Born: 4 December 1935
- Died: 19 July 2022 (aged 86)
- Genres: Classical
- Occupations: Organist, conductor

Richard Godfrey Seal (4 December 1935 – 19 July 2022) was an English organist and conductor. From 1968 to 1997 he served as organist and master of the choristers at Salisbury Cathedral, which in 1991 established a separate girls choir in addition to the existing boys cathedral choir, the first cathedral to do so.

== Family and education ==
Seal was born Banstead, Surrey, and was a boy chorister at New College, Oxford, under Herbert Kennedy Andrews. He continued his education at Cranleigh School in Surrey and was an organ scholar at Christ's College, Cambridge. This was followed by a year's study at the Royal College of Music in London, while also serving as assistant organist at Kingsway Hall.

In 1975 he married Dr. Sarah Hamilton, with whom he had two sons.

== Career ==
After completing National Service in Malaya, Seal was briefly assistant organist at St Bartholomew-the-Great in Smithfield, London (1960–1961), before serving as assistant organist to John Birch at Chichester Cathedral (1961–1968).

In 1968 he took up the post of organist and master of the choristers at Salisbury Cathedral, a position which he held until 1997. In 1991 he established a separate girls’ choir in addition to the existing boys' cathedral choir, the first English cathedral to do so. A controversial move at the time, it led to a transformation in Anglican choral singing. The girl and boy choristers usually sing separately.

While at Salisbury, Seal made many recordings and broadcasts with the cathedral choir.

He was also conductor and president of the Salisbury Orchestral Society from 1969 to 1994.

== Awards and later life ==
In recognition of his distinguished service to English cathedral music Seal was awarded the Lambeth degree of Doctor of Music in 1992.

Seal retired to Bishopstone, near Salisbury, and continued to play the organ at services in local churches. He died on 19 July 2022 at the age of 86.

Cultural offices
Preceded by ?	Assistant Organist of Chichester Cathedral; 1961–1968	Succeeded by Michael Davey
Preceded by Christopher Hugh Dearnley	Organist and Master of the Choristers of Salisbury Cathedral; 1968-1997	Succeeded by Simon Lole
