= Edward Piper (organist) =

English organist

Edward Piper (dates unknown) was an English organist.

== Career ==
Piper was paid as Organist in the 1560-1 accounts of the Chichester Cathedral treasury. He was also a Lay Vicar in the cathedral and was appointed Master of the Choristers in 1562. His short tenure as Organist was to fill a one year interim role for Thomas Coring, who resumed his position in 1561.

== See also ==
- Organs and organists of Chichester Cathedral

Cultural offices
Preceded by Thomas Coring	Organist of Chichester Cathedral; 1560-1561	Succeeded by Thomas Coring
Preceded by William Payne	Master of the Choristers of Chichester Cathedral; 1562-1568	Succeeded by William Payne
