= Thomas Tremain =

English organist (1737–??)

Thomas Tremain (born 1737) was an English organist.

== Career ==
Tremain had been an articled pupil of Thomas Capell for seven years from 1751. In 1765, he unsuccessfully applied for the post of Organist at St Stephen's Church, Walbrook in the City of London. He became Capell's second Deputy Organist (of Chichester Cathedral) in 1771, following the dismissal of Richard Hall due to his 'neglect of duty'. Tremain was also Master of the Choristers at Chichester, but was dismissed from both posts in favour of William Walond Jr.

He continued his organist career in Andover in the 1780s, during which time he published two collections of church music.

== See also ==
- Organs and organists of Chichester Cathedral

Cultural offices
Preceded by Richard Hall	Deputy Organist of Chichester Cathedral; 1771-1775	Succeeded by William Walond Jr.
