= Organ Concerto (Poulenc) =

Organ concerto composed by Francis Poulenc

Concerto pour orgue, cordes et timbales Organ Concerto
- by Francis Poulenc
- Poulenc in 1922
- Key: G minor
- Catalogue: FP 93
- Composed: 1934–38
- Scoring: organ; timpani; string orchestra

The Concerto pour orgue, cordes et timbales (Concerto for organ, timpani and strings) in G minor, FP 93, is an organ concerto composed by Francis Poulenc between 1934 and 1938. It has become one of the most frequently performed pieces of the genre not written in the Baroque period.

== History of composition ==
The organ concerto was commissioned by Princess Edmond de Polignac in 1934, as a piece with a chamber orchestra accompaniment and an easy organ part that the princess could probably play herself. The commission was originally given to Jean Françaix, who declined, but Poulenc accepted. Poulenc quickly abandoned this idea for something much more grandiose and ambitious; his earlier harpsichord concerto and double-piano concerto were simpler, more light-hearted pieces. As he wrote in a letter to Françaix, "The concerto...is not the amusing Poulenc of the Concerto for two pianos, but more like a Poulenc en route for the cloister." The death of a colleague and friend, the young critic and composer Pierre-Octave Ferroud, in the spring of 1936 made Poulenc go on a pilgrimage to the Black Virgin of Rocamadour, where he rediscovered his Christian faith. This new religious conviction not only nurtured an interest in religious music, which he began to compose, but also highly influenced his incomplete Organ Concerto. Indeed, Poulenc referred to it as being on the fringe of his religious works.

Poulenc himself had never actually composed for the organ before, and so he studied great baroque masterpieces for the instrument by Johann Sebastian Bach and Dieterich Buxtehude; the work's neo-baroque feel reflects this. Poulenc was also advised about the instrument's registration and other aspects by the organist Maurice Duruflé.

Duruflé was also the soloist in the private premiere of the work on 16 December 1938, with Nadia Boulanger conducting, at Princess Edmond's salon. The first public performance was in June 1939 at the Salle Gaveau in Paris, with Duruflé once again the soloist and Roger Désormière conducting. The first British performance was at Chichester Cathedral in 1943 by Anne Maddocks.

== Instrumentation ==
As the full title of the piece denotes, the piece is scored for a solo organ, timpani and a string orchestra. The piece uses such comparatively small forces, relative to Poulenc's other concertos (the Concert champêtre used a full orchestra as accompaniment), so that the piece could be played in a quite small space with an organ, such as Princess Edmond's salon, that were quite popular in France at the time. The piece would have been premiered on a Cavaillé-Coll instrument, as the company supplied many organs to private customers, one of whom was the princess.

== Analysis ==
The piece is just over 20 minutes in duration and consists of a single continuous movement with seven tempo marks. Respectively, these are: Andante, Allegro giocoso, Subito andante moderato, Tempo allegro. Molto agitato, Très calme: Lent, Tempo de l'allegro initial and Tempo d'introduction: Largo. The sections differ substantially in style, tone and texture. For example, the opening sections are loud and quite violent, with substantial organ chords, while the following middle sections are much calmer and softer.

== Selected recordings ==
Organist	Conductor	Record label	Record Release Date
Maurice Duruflé	Georges Prêtre	Angel S-35953 (EMI)	1961
Berj Zamkochian	Charles Munch	RCA Red Seal	1961
Michael Murray	Robert Shaw	Telarc	1990
Peter Hurford	Charles Dutoit	Decca Records	1993
Thomas Trotter	Bernard Haitink	Philips Classics	1993
Simon Preston	Seiji Ozawa	Deutsche Grammophon	1995
Philippe Lefebvre	Jean-Claude Casadesus	Naxos Records	1998
André Isoir	Edmon Colomer	Calliope	1999
Ian Tracey	Yan Pascal Tortelier	Chandos Records	2000
Marie-Claire Alain	Jean Martinon	Apex Records	2001
Gillian Weir	David Hill	Linn Records	2001
Maurice Duruflé	Georges Prêtre	EMI Classics	2003
Olivier Latry	Christoph Eschenbach	Ondine Records	2007
Jan Bartłomiej Bokszczanin	Alexander Anisimov	ARMS Records	2010
Thomas Trotter	Arvo Volmer	Atoll	2011
James O'Donnell	Yannick Nézet-Séguin	LPO	2014
Kåre Nordstoga	Peter Szilvay	LAWO	2019
Cameron Carpenter	Christoph Eschenbach	Sony Classical Records	2019
Iveta Apkalna	Mariss Jansons	BR-Klassik	2020
Karol Mossakowski	Giancarlo Guerrero	CD Accord	2023

== Bibliography ==
- Schmidt, Carl B. (1995). The Music of Francis Poulenc (1899–1963): A Catalogue. Oxford: Clarendon Press. ISBN 9780191585166.
