= William Eames =

English organist (d. 1637)

William Eames (died 1637) was an English organist.

== Career ==
Eames succeeded Thomas Weelkes as Organist of Winchester College in 1604, and was then Organist of Wimborne Minster from 1610–21. In 1624 he was admitted as Organist of Chichester Cathedral. An unknown offence occasioned his expulsion from office in 1635.

Eames is buried at Winchester College.

== See also ==
- Organs and organists of Chichester Cathedral

Cultural offices
Preceded by Thomas Weelkes	Organist of Chichester Cathedral; 1624–1635	Succeeded by Thomas Lewis
