= Clifford Barker =

Clifford Barker may refer to:

- Clifford Barker (bishop) (1926–2017), Anglican suffragan bishop
- Clifford Barker (cricketer) (1917–1942), South African cricketer and South African Army officer
- Cliff Barker (Clifford Eugene Barker, 1921–1998), American basketball player
