= James Target =

English organist

James Target (October 1778 – 15 May 1803) was an English organist, and notably the first Organist and Master of the Choristers of Chichester Cathedral, after the posts of 'Organist' and 'Master of the Choristers' were merged in 1801.

== Career ==
Target had been a chorister at Chichester Cathedral under William Walond Jr. for five years. At the age of 22, he became Organist and Master of the Choristers of the cathedral. The cathedral Chapter records show that Thomas Barber (Master of the Choristers, 1794–1801) was "removed" so that Target could assume both posts.

Target also wrote three anthems that were published locally. He died on 15 May 1803 at the age of 24.

== See also ==
- Organs and organists of Chichester Cathedral

Cultural offices
Preceded by William Walond Jr. (Organist); Thomas Barber (Master of the Choristers)	Organist and Master of the Choristers of Chichester Cathedral; 1801-1803	Succeeded by Thomas Bennett
