= Edward Ford (soldier) =

English soldier and inventor

Sir Edward Ford
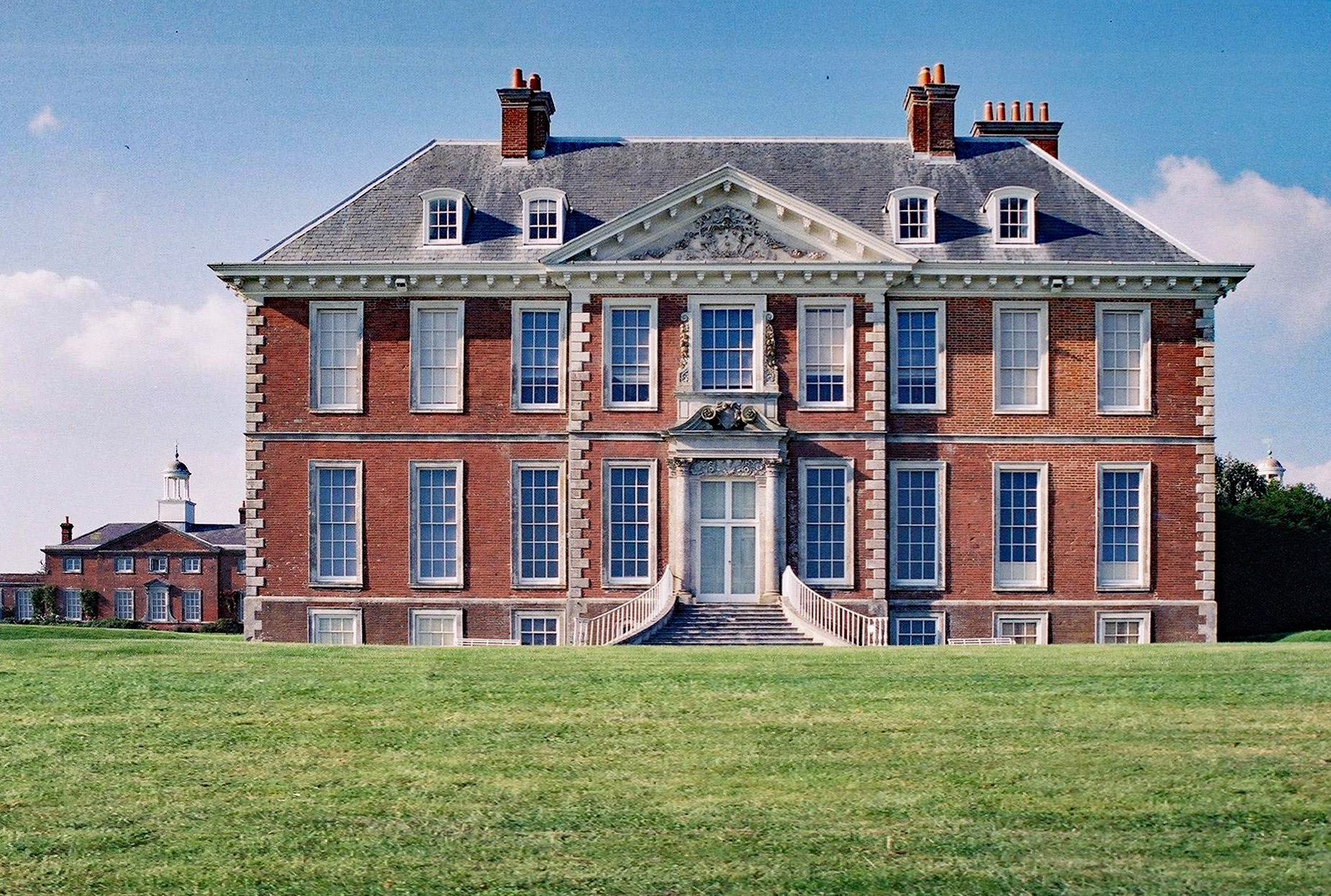
- Uppark House; built by his grandson Ford Grey, 1st Earl of Tankerville

High Sheriff of Sussex
- In office 1642–1643

Personal details
- Born: 22 April 1605 (baptised) Uppark, near Harting, West Sussex
- Died: 3 September 1670 (aged 65) Ireland
- Resting place: St Mary and St Gabriel, Harting
- Spouse: Sarah Ireton
- Children: Katherine
- Education: Trinity College, Oxford
- Occupation: Landowner and inventor

Military service
- Years of service: 1642 to 1646
- Rank: Colonel
- Battles/wars: First English Civil War; Capture of Chichester; Battle of Muster Green; Siege of Chichester; Siege of Arundel; Siege of Winchester Castle

Sir Edward Ford (22 April 1605 – 3 September 1670), was a member of the West Sussex gentry and inventor, who fought for the Royalists in the Wars of the Three Kingdoms. In his "History of the Rebellion", Clarendon judged that while 'a man of honesty and courage', Ford lacked experience of war and was an ineffectual soldier. However, he proved a reliable and trustworthy agent during negotiations between Charles I and Parliament in the period leading up to the 1648 Second English Civil War.

== Personal details ==
Edward Ford was born on the family estates at Uppark, near Harting, West Sussex, eldest son of Sir William Ford (1570- 1653) and Anna Carell (1575-1658). He had an elder sister Magdalen (1604-?), and two younger brothers, John (1606-1681) and William (1608-?).

Sometime before 1634 he married Sarah Ireton, sister of Puritan radical and future Parliamentarian general Henry Ireton. They had one surviving daughter Katherine (1634 to c. 1682).

== Career ==
He became a gentleman-commoner of Trinity College, Oxford, in 1621, but left the university without taking a degree. Charles I gave him a colonel's commission on the outbreak of the war, and in 1642 made him High Sheriff of Sussex. According to Vicars he offered his majesty "a thousand men, and to undertake the conquest of Sussex, though sixty miles in length." He began to raise forces accordingly, and on 18 November 1642 the House of Commons ordered him to be apprehended. After previously capturing the city of Chichester for the King, on the first week of December 1642 on Muster Green in Haywards Heath in Sussex, Ford was the leader of the Royalist army at the Battle of Muster Green, and lost the battle, whereupon he retreated back through Sussex to Chichester. Sir William Waller, after taking Winchester and Arundel Castle, besieged Chichester, which Ford surrendered eight days later (29 December) Ford soon afterwards obtained his release by the interest of his wife, Sarah, with her brother, General Henry Ireton. On 4 October 1643 he was knighted by Charles I at Oxford.

Ford commanded a regiment of horse under Lord Hopton, to whom he proposed the recapture of Arundel Castle. Hopton took it after three days' siege (19 December 1643). Ford was left in command by Hopton, with a garrison of above two hundred men and many good officers, but, Clarendon says, he had insufficient experience, although "a man of honour and courage". After a siege of seventeen days the garrison surrendered "at mercy", Ford and Sir Edward Bishop presenting themselves to Sir William Waller on 6 January 1643–4 as hostages for the delivery of the castle, both thus becoming his prisoners for the second time. They were declared by parliament on 9 October 1644 to be incapable of any employment. Ford was imprisoned in the Tower of London, from which in December he escaped. He then retired to the continent. In 1647 the queen, knowing his relationship with Ireton, sent him to England to join Sir John Berkeley in a futile negotiation with the army.

On 12 November 1647 Ford with others was ordered by the House of Commons into safe custody upon suspicion of being privy to the king's escape from Hampton Court. On 21 March 1648/9 parliament ordered that he should pay for his delinquency one full third of the value of his estate. On 9 July 1649 the house made an order for remitting the remainder of his fine and discharging his sequestration.

In 1656 Ford was employed, with Oliver Cromwell's encouragement, and at the request of the citizens of London, in devising an engine for raising the River Thames water into all the higher streets of the city, a height of ninety-three feet. This he accomplished in a year's time, and at his own expense; and the same "rare engine" was later employed for draining mines and lands. He later, with Thomas Toogood, constructed the water-engine near the Strand Bridge for the neighbourhood. As it obstructed the view from Somerset House, Catherine of Braganza caused it to be demolished; but Ford and Toogood obtained a royal licence to erect other waterworks at Wapping, Marylebone, and between Temple Bar and Charing Cross. After the Restoration he invented a mode of coining farthings. Each piece was to differ minutely from another to prevent forgery. He failed in procuring a patent for these in England, but obtained one for Ireland.

Ford died in Ireland before he could carry out his plans for coins, on 3 September 1670. His body was brought to England, and interred in the family burial-place at Harting.

== Works ==
Ford wrote:

- A Design for bringing a Navigable River from Rickmansworth in Hartfordshire to St. Giles's in the Fields, London, 1641, with an answer by Sir Walter Roberts, printed the same year, and both reprinted in 1720. Ford's pamphlet is also reprinted in the Harleian Miscellany.
- Experimented Proposals how the King may have money to pay and maintain his Fleets with ease to his people. London may he rebuilt, and all proprietors satisfied. Money be lent at six percent, on pawns. And the Fishing-Trade set up, which alone is able and sure to enrich us all. And all this without altering, straining, or thwarting any of our Laws or Customes now in use, London, 1666. To this was added a Defence of Bill Credit.
- Proposals for maintaining the Fleet and rebuilding London, by bills to be made payable on the taxes to be given to the King by Parliament, manuscript in Public Record Office, "State Papers", Dom. Charles II, vol. clxii.
- Letters of intelligence, among the "Clarendon State Papers" in the Bodleian Library at Oxford.

He published in 1644 Observations upon the Dutch Fishing, a tract by John Keymer.

== Family ==
Ford's only daughter, Katharine, married first to Alexander Colepeper, son of John Colepeper, 1st Baron Colepeper by his first wife Philippa Snelling. Alexander was born c. 1629 and died without issue: Katharine was granted administration of his estate in 1660.

By Katharine's second marriage, to Ralph Grey, 2nd Baron Grey of Werke, Up Park became the property of the earls of Tankerville until it was sold in 1745.

== See also ==
- History of Sussex

== Sources ==
- Clarendon, Earl of (2019). The History of the Rebellion and Civil Wars in England. Vol. III (Reprint of 1704 ed.). Wentworth Press. ISBN 978-0469445765.
- Donagan, Barbara (2004). "Ford, Sir Edward (1605-1670)". Oxford Dictionary of National Biography (online ed.). Oxford University Press. doi:10.1093/ref:odnb/9855. (Subscription, Wikipedia Library access or UK public library membership required.)

Attribution

This article incorporates text from a publication now in the public domain: Stephen, Leslie, ed. (1889). "Ford, Edward (1605-1670)". Dictionary of National Biography. Vol. 19. London: Smith, Elder & Co.
