= Richard Hall (organist) =

English organist

Richard Hall (died 1773) was an English organist.

== Career ==
Hall had been a Lay Vicar at Chichester Cathedral since 1746. He was appointed as Thomas Capell's first Deputy Organist of the cathedral in 1765 - however he was dismissed in 1771 due to his 'vicious life and neglect of duty'. Records show that he remained in the choir and is described as 'singing-man' at his burial.

== See also ==
- Organs and organists of Chichester Cathedral

Cultural offices
Preceded by none	Deputy Organist of Chichester Cathedral; 1765 - 1771	Succeeded by Thomas Tremain
