= Text declamation =

Text declamation refers to the manner in which a composer sets words to music. Aesthetically, declamation is conceived of as "accurate" (approximating the natural rhythms and patterns of human speech) or not, which informs perceptions about emotional power as expressed through the relationship between words and music.

== Renaissance composers and word painting ==
Late Renaissance composers in particular were concerned with matching text up with music in such a way that the latter could be said to express the former. Madrigalists used a declamation technique known as word painting (text painting or tone painting) to make musical notes illustrate word meanings, trying literally to paint visual images with sonic materials. Thomas Weelkes' madrigal "As Vesta was from Latmos hill descending" uses word painting throughout to declaim textual meaning:

mm 1-9: "Latmos hill" - "hill" is always set with the highest note in the phrase
mm 8-9: "descending" - uses descending scales and leaps
mm 12-22: "ascending" - uses ascending scales
mm 36-46: "running down amain" - uses quickly descending scales in imitative polyphony
mm 48-49: "two by two" - two voices sing
mm 50-51: "three by three" - three voices sing
mm 51-52: "together" - all six voices sing
mm 56-57: "all alone" - top voice sings alone
mm 84-100: "Long live fair Oriana" - low voice begins with longa, continues with long, sustained notes
