= William Walond Jr. =

English organist

William Walond (bap. 4 January 1750 - 9 February 1836) was an English organist, and the last 'Organist' of Chichester Cathedral before the post was merged with 'Master of the Choristers' in 1801.

== Career ==
Walond was the son of English composer and organist William Walond Sr. (1719-1768). He became the third of Thomas Capell's Deputy Organists at Chichester Cathedral, following Richard Hall and Thomas Tremain. He succeeded Capell following his death in 1776. Walond resigned the role of Master of the Choristers in 1794, and passed it to a Lay Vicar, Thomas Barber, who was paid by Walond out of his own salary.

During Walond's Organistship at Chichester, additions were made to the Cathedral organ by Thomas Knight, including the provision of the third manual (swell organ).

== See also ==
- Organs and organists of Chichester Cathedral

Cultural offices
Preceded by Thomas Capell	Organist of Chichester Cathedral; 1776 - 1801	Succeeded by James Target (Organist and Master of the Choristers)
Preceded by Thomas Tremain	Master of the Choristers of Chichester Cathedral; 1775 - 1794	Succeeded by Thomas Barber
Preceded by Thomas Tremain	Deputy Organist of Chichester Cathedral; 1775	Succeeded by none
