= Richard Cock =

Richard Cock (born 27 July 1949) is a South African musician and conductor currently based in Johannesburg.

== Early life and education ==
Cock was born in Port Elizabeth in 1949 and was educated at Woodridge College in the Eastern Cape, and Diocesan College and the South African College of Music in Cape Town. He was awarded a scholarship to the Royal School of Church Music in 1972.

== Career ==
=== United Kingdom ===
He was an alto lay vicar at Chichester Cathedral before becoming Assistant Organist in 1978. As was customary for the cathedral's assistant organist, he was also Director of Music at Prebendal School, the cathedral choir school. He also established the Chichester Cathedral Choristers' Association (CCCA).

=== South Africa ===
Cock returned to South Africa in 1980. Since then he has been a producer working for the South African Broadcasting Corporation, Music Director of the National Symphony Orchestra of South Africa (1991-1999), Director of Music of St Mary's Cathedral, Johannesburg and the current Artistic Director of the Johannesburg Festival Orchestra He is also acclaimed as South Africa's 'first professional countertenor'.

== See also ==
- Organs and organists of Chichester Cathedral

Cultural offices
| Preceded by Ian Fox | Assistant Organist of Chichester Cathedral; 1978-1980 | Succeeded by Kenneth Sweetman |
