= Clifford Barker (cricketer) =

South African cricketer

Personal information
- Full name: Clifford Mark Barker
- Born: 16 April 1917; Pinetown, Natal, South Africa
- Died: 27 July 1942 (aged 25); Qattara, Egypt

Domestic team information
- Years: Team
- 1938: Transvaal

Career statistics
Competition	First-class
Matches	1
Runs scored	13
Batting average	13.00
100s/50s	0/0
Top score	13
Balls bowled	208
Wickets	2
Bowling average	43.50
5 wickets in innings	0
10 wickets in match	0
Best bowling	2/83
Catches/stumpings	1/0
- Source: Cricinfo, 10 August 2020

Clifford Mark Barker (16 April 1917 – 27 July 1942) was a South African first-class cricketer and South African Army officer.

Born in Pinetown in 1917, Barker appeared in one first-class Currie Cup match for Transvaal against the Orange Free State at the Old Wanderers, Johannesburg, on 21 January 1938. During the match, Barker took 2 wickets and was dismissed both innings.

During the Second World War, Barker served as a lieutenant in the 1st Royal Natal Carabineers. Between 26 and 27 July 1942, the unit was involved in defensive actions at Qattara during the First Battle of El Alamein, during which Barker was killed in action on 27 July. He was buried at El Alamein War Cemetery.
