= Harvey Grace =

English musician

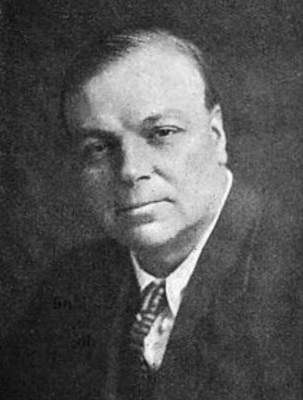
- Born: 25 January 1874; Romsey, Hampshire, England
- Died: 15 February 1944 (aged 70); Bromley, Greater London, England
- Occupations: Composer, conductor, editor, teacher
- Spouse: Dorothy Kirby (m. 1916)
- Children: 2

Harvey Grace (1874–1944) was an English musician: a composer, conductor, editor and teacher, best known for the 26 year period he worked as editor at The Musical Times.

== Early years ==
Harvey Grace was born on 25 January 1874. His music education began as a chorister, alongside his four brothers, in the Abbey church at Romsey, his home town. Here was where he first began to play the organ. Grace continued his practical musical education at Southwark Cathedral under Alfred Madeley Richardson (1868–1949). At the same time his academic music education was undertaken by R. J. Pitcher (sometime organist of St Mary Kilburn and Professor of Singing at the Guildhall School of Music and Drama).

- (date?–date?). Organist of All Saints, Binfield, Berkshire.
- (date?)–1905. Organist of St Alphege's, Southwark, London.
- 1905. Grace passed the examinations to become a Fellow of the Royal College of Organists (FRCO). He would later become a member of the College's Council.

== Later life ==
- 1905–1921. Grace was appointed Organist of St Agnes's, Kennington, London, a post he held until 1921 .
- In 1916 he married Dorothy Kirby, and together they had two children, Dorothy Mary (Molly) and Robert Harvey.
- Between 1918 and 1944 he was editor of The Musical Times. He was one of the longest serving editors there, bringing a new interest in contemporary developments in composition to the publication. He wrote under the pen name 'Feste'.
- 1921–1925. Organist of St Mary Magdalene's, Munster Square, London.
- 1925–1931. Grace held no organist posts, preferring instead to concentrate on his work as a writer and editor, most notably of The Musical Times.
- 1931–1938. Organist of Chichester Cathedral. Grace's years at Chichester saw the introduction there of plainsong (from May 1936) coinciding with a new awareness there of liturgical solemnity.
- 1932. Awarded the Lambeth degree of Doctor of Music.
- 1935. Grace was elected to the Corporation of Trinity College London, becoming a board member and a professor of organ and theory.
- 1937. During this year Grace was Commissioner of the School of English Church Music, resigning at the end of the year.
- 1941–43. organist of East Grinstead parish church.
- Harvey Grace died on 15 February 1944 in Bromley Hospital while awaiting surgery.

== Author ==
- 1917: Music in Parish Churches. A plea for the simple. (London: Church Music Society).
- 1919: French Organ Music, past and present. (Reprinted from the New Music Review.). (New York : H. W. Gray Co.).
- 1920: The Complete Organist (London : Richards Press).
- 1927: Ludwig van Beethoven (London: Kegan Paul).
- 1928: Editor of A Handbook for Choralists. 34 studies by Edward C. Bairstow and others and 6 rounds by Beethoven. [With musical notes.] (London: Novello).
- 1928: A Musician at Large. (London: Humphrey Milford).
- 1936: Music and worship, with Walford Davies. (London: : Eyre & Spottiswoode).
- 1938: Bach (Novello Short Biographies)
- 1938: The Training and Conducting of Choral Societies. (A collation of articles that appeared in The Musical Times in 1930–31. (London: Novello).
- 1937 The Listener's Guide to the Organ Music of Bach. [With musical notes]. (London: Columbia Graphophone Co.).
- 1943: Music (British Council "Britain Advances" series). Longmans.

== Composer ==
=== for chamber ensemble ===
- 1927. J. S. Bach. 'Ich steh' mit einem Fuss im Grabe: (adagio espressivo) from Cantata no. 156 arranged for violin and piano
- 1928. J. S. Bach. Sonatina from the cantata, "'God's time is best/Gottes Zeit is die allebeste Zeit, arranged for violin and piano
- 1928. J. S. Bach. Slumber song 'Schlummert ein' from Cantata no. 82, arranged for violin (or 'cello) and piano (or organ)
- 1930. J. S. Bach. 'Jesu, joy of man's desiring/Wohl mir, dass ich Jesum habe from Cantata 147; arranged for violin (or 'cello) and piano (or organ)
- 1940. J. S. Bach. Sheep may safely graze/Schafe können sicher weiden, arranged for violin, violoncello and piano

=== for choir ===
- 1908/1936. Benedicite, omnia opera
- 1909. Spring (S.S.A)
- 1911. Content (S.S.A.)
- 1912. Fisher-folk lullaby (S.A.T.B.)(op. 18/i)
- 1913. The daffodils; 3-part song (op.5, no.3)
- 1919. The Snowflake; two-part song
- 1925. Henry Purcell: 'An evening hymn (S.A.T.B.); arranged
- 1927. Pioneers! : marching song for unison chorus
- 1930. 24 Studies in sight-singing and interpretation for mixed voices
- 1932. Magnificat and Nunc dimittis in C
- 1936. Magnificat and Nunc dimittis on plainsong tones with faux-bourdon
- 1937. Thomas Kelway. 'Magnificat and Nunc Dimittis in Gmin'; edited from a M.S. in the Library of Chichester Cathedral and an organ part added.
- 1939. The fairy painters: unison song
- 1939. Night : two-part song

=== for organ ===
- 1908. Fantasy after Rheinberger (op. 9)
- 1908. Lament (op. 10)
- 1912. A Christmas Postlude
- 1913. Legend (op. 16)
- 1914. Epilogue
- 1915. Organ Music (op. 17) (v. 1, Rhapsody --v. 2. Three psalm-tune postludes: 1. Martyrs; 2. London new; 3. The old hundredth -- v. 3, Monologues: 1. Meditation (in ancient tonality); 2. Caprice.).
- 1922. Five Pieces (1.; 2.; 3.; 4. 'Reverie, on the Hymn tune "University" (EH 93)'; 5. .)
- 1922. Ten Compositions for Organ (v. 1. Laus Deo; Cradle song; Toccatina; In-voluntary; Scherzo—v. 2. Ostinato; Meditation; Reverie; Plaint; Resurgam.)
- 1926. Henry Purcell. 'A ground (Evening Hymn)'; arranged,
- 1926. J. S. Bach. Ten Transcriptions. v1. Bourree in D - Passepied in E - Aadgio in E-flat - Air in D - Adagio in D minor. v2. Brandenburgische Konzerte, No.1 BWV1046, F major. Minuet and polacca; arr. organ. Arias, Nicht so traurig BWV489. arr. organ. Suites, cello BWV1012, D major. Sarabande; arr. organ

Brandenburgische Konzerte, No.1 BWV1046, Fmajor. Adagio; arr. organ. Suites, orchestra BWV1066, C major. Bourree; arr. organ.)

- 1927. J. S. Bach. 'Jesu, Joy of Man's Desiring': chorale from Cantata No. 147; arranged.
- 1928. Franz Schubert. 'Minuet and Trio'; arranged
- 1934. J. S. Bach. Song tune from the Peasant Cantata; arranged
- 1934. J. S. Bach: Twelve Transcriptions from the Vocal works; arranged.
- 1937. Edward Elgar. 'Solemn prelude, in memoriam' (from "For the Fallen" [op80, no.3]; arranged.
- 1942. Purcell's Trumpet Voluntary; arranged.
- 1950. J. S. Bach. 'Nist du bei mir/Be Thou but near'; arrabged.
- 1950. J. S. Bach. 'Mer hahn en neue Oberkeet'; arranged.

=== for voice ===
- 1912. Songs for Mezzo Soprano (op. 8) (1. 'The Year's at the Spring'; 2. 'A Widow Bird Sat Mourning'; 3. 'A Farewell'; 4. 'There's a Friend for little Children')
- 1923. Henry Purcell: An Evening Hymn for low voice; arranged
- 1925. On a Nankin plate

== Music editor ==
- 1932–1937. The twenty organ sonatas by Josef Rheinberger.
- 1938. Beethoven. Edward C. Bairstow, Harold E. Darke, T. F. Dunhill, Harvey Grace, Julius Harrison, Geoffrey Shaw. 'Thirty-four Studies in Sight-Singing and Interpretation for Mixed Voices [...] and six Rounds
- 1943–1945. The major organ works of César Franck.

Cultural offices
Preceded by Marmaduke Conway	Organist and Master of the Choristers of Chichester Cathedral; 1931–1937	Succeeded by Horace Hawkins
