= Anne Maddocks =

English organist

Anne Maddocks (23 October 1911 – October 2006) was an English organist.

She was born Nellie Anne Sheail in Heyshott, Sussex, where her parents - both enthusiastic amateur violinists - worked for Lord Mersey on his Bignor Park estate. She grew up in Bignor and Sutton. By the age of 14 she was playing the organ for services at two village churches. From 1937 she began taking organ lessons at Chichester Cathedral with Horace Hawkins, a pupil of Widor, who was the cathedral's organist and choir master. She was appointed Assistant Organist there four years later in 1941, the first woman to hold such a post in the cathedral. She had perfect pitch and as Hawkins put it, she played Widor's music "with the master's interpretation". She gave the first British performance of Poulenc's Organ Concerto at the cathedral in 1943. There is a private wax recording of the performance.

1n 1955 she was married to Morris Maddocks, then curate of St Peter's Church, Ealing, later Assistant Bishop of Bath and Wells and Bishop of Selby, in Chichester Cathedral. She changed her name to Anne Maddocks, gave up her organist post and in 1958 moved from Ealing to Yorkshire with her husband, where he was successively appointed vicar of Weaverthorpe with Helperthorpe, Luttons Ambo and Kirby Grindalythe. After that they were ten years (1961-1971) at the Church of St Martin-on-the-Hill, Scarborough where Anne played the church's Henry Willis organ. Maddocks was appointed Bishop of Selby in 1972.

In 1983, she and her husband started the Acorn Christian Healing Trust, now the Acorn Christian Healing Foundation.

On retirement in 1994 Anne and Morris returned to Cathedral Close, Chichester, where they frequently attended Evensong. Anne died in October 2006 and her funeral was in Chichester Cathedral, where Widor's Mass was sung. Her husband died in January 2008.

== See also ==
- Morris Maddocks

Cultural offices
Preceded by Claude Appleby	Assistant Organist of Chichester Cathedral; 1942–1949	Succeeded by ?
