= Horace Hawkins (musician) =

English classical organist

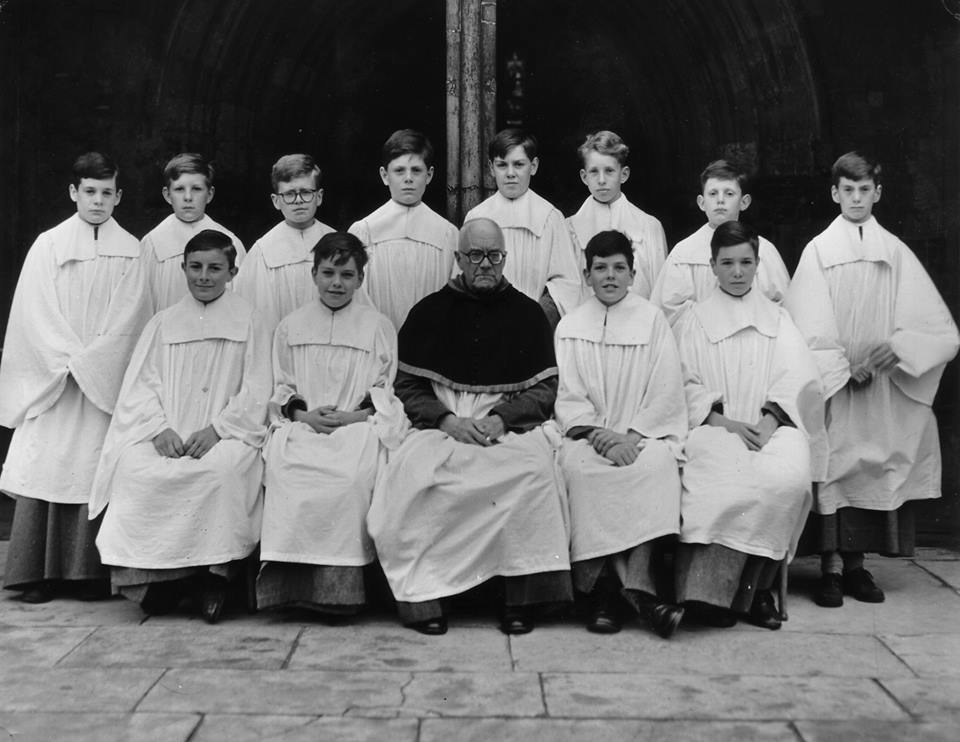
Hawkins with the Choir of Chichester Cathedral, shortly before his retirement in 1958.

Horace Arthur Hawkins (2 November 1880 – 23 January 1966) was an English classical organist. He succeeded Harvey Grace as organist and Master of the Choristers at Chichester Cathedral. The Cathedral Chapter tried to entice the noted musical educator Geoffrey Shaw into the organist's seat, but it was not to be; after a long interregnum, they appointed Hawkins on his retirement from Hurstpierpoint College, where he had been organist for 22 years.

Hawkins was born in Southborough, Tunbridge Wells, Kent. He had been a chorister at King Charles the Martyr Church, Tunbridge Wells, and articled to W. H. Sangster at St. Saviour's, Eastbourne. He was for a time, assistant organist at Winchester Cathedral; eight years at St Andrew's Church, Worthing, were followed by a spell in Paris. Hawkins studied with the Solesmes monks and took lessons with Widor (whose Ave verum, still sung by the Cathedral Choir, is dedicated to Hawkins), as well as being organist of St. George's Anglican Church.

Hawkins totally encompassed the French symphonic style of organ-playing and was noted for his improvisation and liturgical use of the organ. His compositions, which were never published, include a setting of the Te Deum for massed men's voices, four-part choir, brass and organ.

Hawkins held his position at Chichester for 20 years, before being succeeded by John Birch. One of Hawkins' Assistant Organists during this time was Anne Maddocks, whose appointment in 1942 marked the first time a woman held such a post in an English cathedral.

Cultural offices
| Preceded by Harvey Grace | Organist and Master of the Choristers of Chichester Cathedral; 1938–1958 | Succeeded by John Birch |
