= Thomas Barber (musician) =

English musician and singer

Thomas Barber (c.1740 – c.1810) was an English musician and singer. He was the last Master of the Choristers of Chichester Cathedral before the position was merged with the Organist post in 1801.

== Career ==
Barber was a Lay Vicar at Chichester Cathedral in the 1790s under the direction of William Walond Jr. Walond resigned the position of Master of the Choristers in 1794 (but retained the separate position of Organist) – Barber was appointed in his stead, and received his fee from Walond's salary.

In 1801, James Target was appointed Organist and Master of the Choristers of Chichester Cathedral. The cathedral Chapter records indicate that Barber had to be 'removed' in order for Target to assume the newly merged liturgical position.

Cultural offices
Preceded by William Walond Jr.	Master of the Choristers of Chichester Cathedral; 1794–1801	Succeeded by James Target (Organist and Master of the Choristers)
