= Henry R. Bennett =

English organist

Henry Robert Bennett (c. 1819 – c. 1896) was an English organist who held the position of Organist and Master of the Choristers at Chichester Cathedral from 1848 to 1860.

== Career ==
Bennett was a pupil of, and a chorister under his father, Thomas Bennett, at Magdalen College, Oxford. He succeeded his father as Organist and Master of the Choristers at Chichester Cathedral in 1848, spending one year on probation. He was also organist at St John the Evangelist's Church, Chichester in 1849 - again succeeding his father.

== Personal life ==
Henry Bennett's father was Thomas Bennett, and his brother was Alfred Bennett. Alfred was organist at New College, Oxford and was killed after falling from a stage coach en route to the Three Choirs Festival, in 1830.

Cultural offices
Preceded by Thomas Bennett	Organist and Master of the Choristers of Chichester Cathedral; 1848-1860	Succeeded by Philip Armes
