= Thomas Weelkes =

English composer

- Born: Thomas Weeke; Elsted, Sussex, England
- Died: London, England
- Genres: Renaissance music, choral, Anglican church music
- Occupations: Composer, organist, music instructor
- Instrument: Organ
- Formerly of: Chapel Royal
- Spouse: Elizabeth Sandham (m. 1603; d. 1622)

Thomas Weelkes (1576 (?) – November 1623) was an English composer and organist. He became organist of Winchester College in 1598, moving to Chichester Cathedral. His works are chiefly vocal, and include madrigals, anthems and services.

== Life ==
=== Early life ===
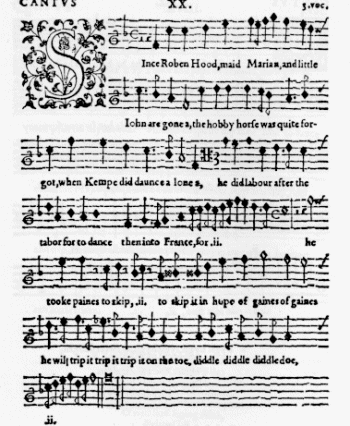
Weelkes madrigal print: Since Robin Hood, Maid Marian and Little John are gone, 1608

There is no documentary evidence about Weelkes's early years. According to the biographer David Brown, circumstantial evidence points to the possibility that Weelkes was a son of John Weeke, rector of Elsted in Sussex and his wife Johanne. If this was so, the boy was the Thomas Weeke baptised at Elsted on 25 October 1576; he had at least five siblings. Brown adds that there is no firmer evidence about Weelkes's childhood and musical training, although one piece of information is found in the preface to Weelkes’s collection Ballets and Madrigals (1598), where he states that he had been in the service of "his master Edward Darcy Esquire, Groom to her Majesty’s Privy Chamber".

=== Early musical career, organist at Winchester College ===
In the preface to his first volume of madrigals (1597) Weelkes states that he was a very young man at the time of their composition – "my yeeres yet unripened" – which, in Brown's view, confirms that he was born in the middle or later 1570s. By 1597 Weelkes, by his own account, had enjoyed the "undeserved love, and liberall good will" of George Phillpot, who lived at Compton, near Winchester. Towards the end of 1598 he was appointed organist of Winchester College at a salary of 13s. 4d. a quarter, with board and lodging.

Weelkes remained at the college for three or four years, and, according to Brown, during this period he composed his finest madrigals. They appeared in two volumes (1598 and 1600); Brown calls the second – works for five and six voices – "one of the most important volumes in the English madrigal tradition."

=== Chichester Cathedral and Gentleman of the Chapel Royal ===
At some time between October 1601 and October 1602 Weelkes joined the choir of Chichester Cathedral as organist and informator choristarum (instructor of the choristers) with, in addition, a well-paid lay-clerkship. He obtained the degree of Bachelor of Music from New College, Oxford in July 1602. On 20 February he 1603 married Elizabeth Sandham, the daughter of a wealthy Chichester merchant; they had at least three children.

On the title page of Weelkes's fourth and final volume of madrigals, published in 1608, he refers to himself as a Gentleman of the Chapel Royal. The records at the Chapel Royal do not mention him, but the musicologist Walter S. Collins observes, "one would hardly dare publish such a claim if it were not true". Brown infers that Wilkes may have been a Gentleman Extraordinary – a temporary rather than a permanent appointment.

=== Poor behaviour ===
While Weelkes was at Chichester members of its choir were often in trouble with the authorities for poor behaviour. As the Oxford Dictionary of National Biography puts it, Weelkes "was not the only disorderly member of the cathedral establishment, though in due course he would become its most celebrated." In 1609 he was charged with unauthorised absence from Chichester, but no mention of drunken behaviour is made until 1613, and in The Musical Quarterly John Shepherd has suggested caution in assuming that Weelkes's decline began before that date.

In 1616 Weelkes was reported to the bishop for being "noted and famed for a comon drunckard [sic] and notorious swearer & blasphemer". The Dean and Chapter dismissed him for being drunk at the organ and using bad language during divine service. He was reinstated and remained in the post until his death, although his behaviour did not improve; in 1619 he was again reported to the bishop:

Dyvers tymes & very often come so disguised eyther from the Taverne or Ale house into the quire as is muche to be lamented, for in these humoures he will bothe curse & sweare most dreadfully, & so profane the service of God … and though he hath bene often tymes admonished … to refrayne theis humors and reforme hym selfe, yett he daylye continuse the same, & is rather worse than better therein.

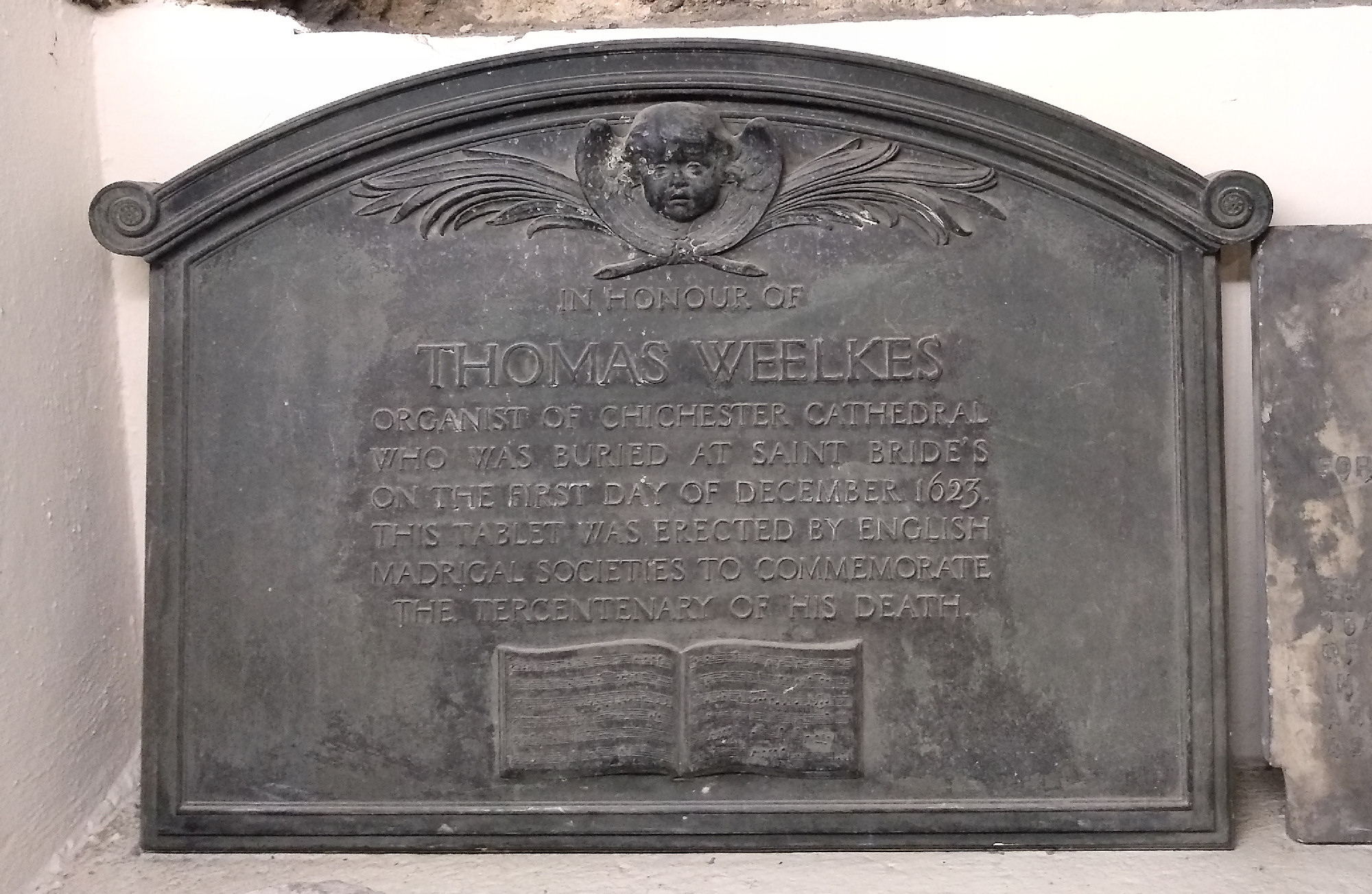
Memorial in St Bride's Church, Fleet Street

== Later years and death ==
In 1622 Elizabeth Weelkes died. Weelkes was, by this time, reinstated at Chichester Cathedral, but appears to have been spending a great deal of time in London. He died in London in 1623, in the house of a friend and was buried on 1 December 1623 at St Bride's Fleet Street. His will, made the day before he died at the house of his friend Henry Drinkwater of St Bride's parish, left his estate to be shared between his three children, with a 50-shilling legacy left to Drinkwater for his meat, drink and lodging.

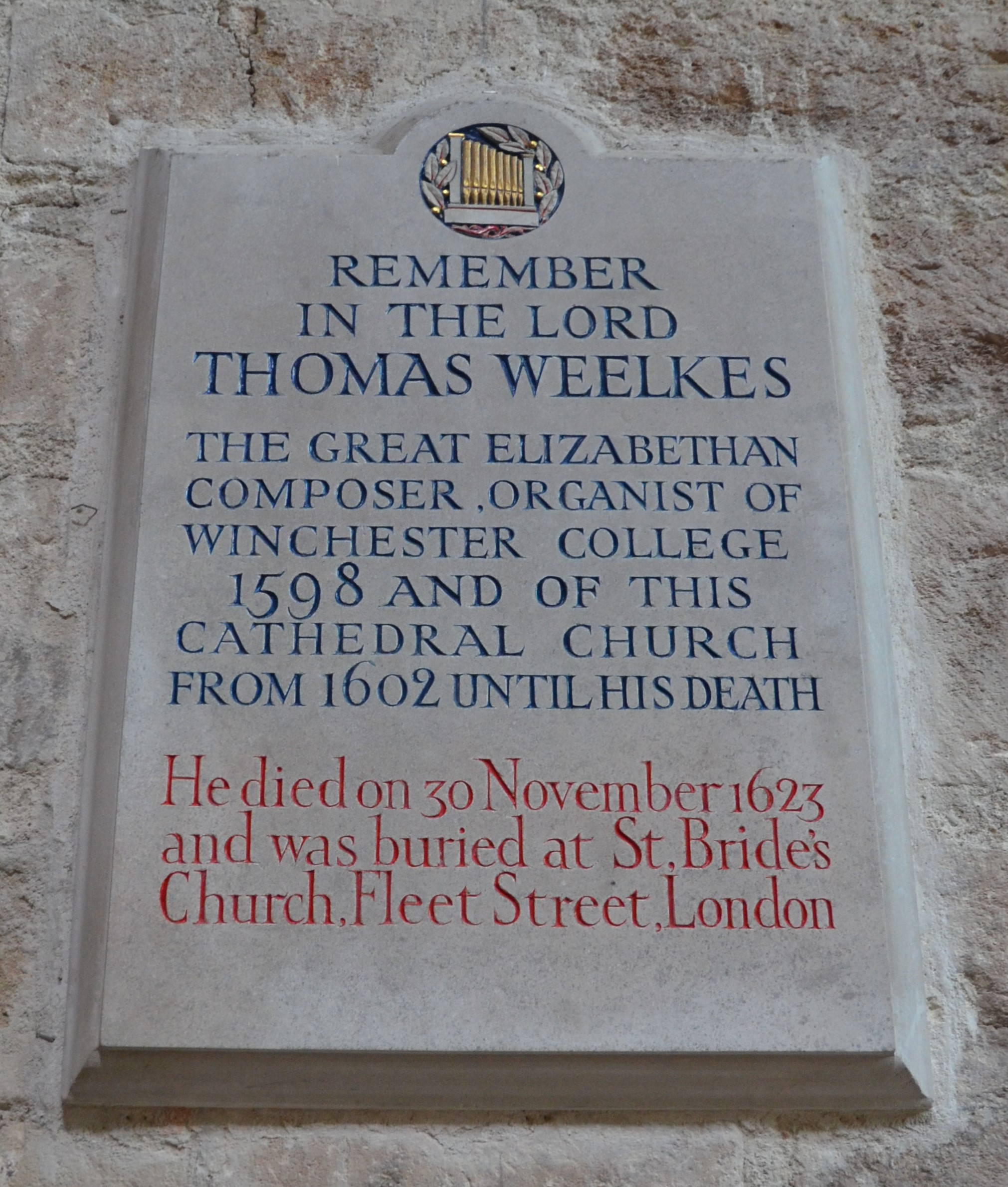
Weelkes' memorial stone in Chichester Cathedral

== Music ==
Weelkes is best known for his vocal music, especially his madrigals and church music. He wrote more Anglican services than any other major composer of the time, mostly for evensong. Many of his anthems are verse anthems, which would have suited the small forces available at Chichester Cathedral. It has been suggested that larger-scale pieces were intended for the Chapel Royal. His coronation anthem, O Lord, grant the King a long life, was performed at the Coronation of Charles III and Camilla in 2023.

Only a small amount of instrumental music was written by Weelkes, and it is rarely performed. His consort music is sombre in tone, contrasting with the often gleeful madrigals.

=== Madrigals ===
Weelkes's madrigals are often compared to those of John Wilbye (who the Dictionary of National Biography described as the most famous of the English madrigalists): it has been suggested that the personalities of the two men - Wilbye appears to have been a more sober character than Weelkes - are reflected in the music. Both men were interested in word painting. Weelkes' madrigals are very chromatic and use varied organic counterpoint and unconventional rhythm in their construction.

Weelkes was friendly with the madrigalist Thomas Morley who died in 1602, when Weelkes was in his mid-twenties (Weelkes commemorated his death in a madrigal-form anthem titled A Remembrance of my Friend Thomas Morley, also known as "Death hath Deprived Me"). Some of Weelkes's madrigals were reprinted in popular collections during the eighteenth and nineteenth centuries, but none of his verse anthems were printed until 1966, since when he has become recognised as one of the most important church composers of his time.

Cultural offices
Preceded by Jacob Hillarye	Organist of Chichester Cathedral; 1602–1623	Succeeded by William Eames
Preceded by Jacob Hillarye	Master of the Choristers of Chichester Cathedral; 1602–1623	Succeeded by ?
