= Francis Edward Gladstone =

English organist

Francis Edward Gladstone (2 March 1845 – 6 September 1928) in Summertown, Oxford, was an English organist. He was related to the politician William Ewart Gladstone.

== Career ==
He was a pupil of Samuel Sebastian Wesley at Winchester Cathedral. He earned his Mus.Doc. at Cambridge University.

He was

- Organist of Holy Trinity Church, Weston-super-Mare 1864-66
- Organist of Llandaff Cathedral 1866-70
- Organist of Chichester Cathedral 1870-73
- Organist of St Patrick's Church, Hove 1873-75
- Organist of St Peter's Church, Brighton 1875-76
- Organist of St. Mark's Church, Lewisham 1876-77
- Organist of Norwich Cathedral 1877-81
- Director of Music of St Mary of the Angels, Bayswater 1881–94.

He was also Professor of Organ (1885–99) at the Royal College of Music and Professor of Harmony and Counterpoint there from 1884 to 1910.

He died in Hereford. An obituary observed: "He loved to be well prepared in everything. It was exactly like him, not only to have written the composition for his own funeral but to have coached the monks beforehand who were to sing it."

Preceded by John Bernard Wilkes	Organist and Master of the Choristers, Llandaff Cathedral; 1866 – 1870	Succeeded by Theodore Aylward
Preceded by Edward Thorne	Organist and Master of the Choristers, Chichester Cathedral; 1870 – 1873	Succeeded by James Pyne
Preceded by Zechariah Buck	Organist and Master of the Music, Norwich Cathedral; 1877 – 1881	Succeeded by Frederick Atkinson
