= William Walond Sr. =

William Walond (born Oxford, baptised 16 July 1719 – died Oxford, buried 21 August 1768) was an English composer and organist.

== Career ==
After four years as Assistant Organist of Christ Church Cathedral, Oxford, Walond graduated from Christ Church, Oxford in 1757. His setting of Alexander Pope's Ode on St Cecilia's Day had served as his exercise. He also published two sets of voluntaries for the organ or harpsichord (op. 1, c. 1752 and op. 2, 1758) and the anthem Not unto us, O Lord.

Of his fourteen children, his eldest son William Walond Jr. (c. 1750-1836) became the last 'Organist' of Chichester Cathedral, before the post was merged with 'Master of the Choristers' in 1801.
