= Michael Davey =

English organist

Michael Davey, MA FRCO LRAM ARCM is an English organist.

== Education ==
He studied at the Royal College of Music where he was awarded the Sir Walford Davies first prize for Organ. He went on to read music at Cambridge University as organ scholar of Corpus Christi College.

== Career ==
He was assistant organist at Chichester Cathedral between 1968 and 1971. He was appointed director of music at Wrekin College in 1971. He was also organist of St Mary the Boltons, St James the Greater, Leicester and St Martin in the Bull Ring. He is now retired.

Cultural offices
| Preceded by Richard Seal | Assistant Organist of Chichester Cathedral; 1968-1971 | Succeeded by Nicholas Cleobury |
