= Stuart Nicholson (organist) =

English organist of Saint Patrick's Cathedral, Dublin (born 1975)

Stuart Nicholson (born 1975) is an English organist.

== Life and career ==
Born in Essex, Stuart graduated from the Royal College of Music (RCM) as an Associate of the RCM in organ performance in 1997 where he was a pupil of John Birch. While a student at the RCM he was the recipient of organ scholarships from St Paul's Cathedral, St Bride's Church, and Temple Church.

In 1998 Nicholson was appointed assistant organist at St Mary's Episcopal Cathedral, Edinburgh. He toured internationally with this cathedral's choir, and performed regularly on BBC Radio 3 and BBC Radio 4. He left that position to become organist and director of music at Waltham Abbey Church. In 2006 he was appointed Assistant Director of Music of St Philip's Cathedral, Birmingham. In 2007 he toured the United States with the cathedral choir. In 2010 he was appointed organist and master of choristers at St Patrick's Cathedral, Dublin, a post he still maintains as of 2024.

As a soloist and accompanist, Stuart has performed in major venues like the Barbican Centre, Royal Albert Hall, Symphony Hall, Birmingham, Westminster Abbey and York Minster. He has performed and recorded with the Royal Philharmonic Orchestra.

== Partial discography ==
- Roderick Elms: Festive Frolic – A Celebration of Christmas (2007, Naxos Records)
