= Frederick Read =

English organist and academic

Frederick John Read (1857–1925), was an English organist and academic.

Read was taught by C. W. Corfe and J. F. Bridge, becoming Organist of Christ Church, Reading, in 1876. He joined the staff of the Royal College of Music ten years later. During the first period he spent at Chichester, the Harris organ case was installed. Read also seems to have improved the standard of the choir, but The Dean and Chapter of the time took a dim view of absences due to his London teaching work, and so he resigned in 1902.

The peak of Read's teaching career was his appointment as Dean of the Faculty of Music at the University of London. He was reappointed to Chichester on Crowe's retirement and died in office. A memorial to Dr. Read is in the south transept of the Cathedral.

Some of his anthems and a service in D for men's voices were published by Novello.

Cultural offices
Preceded by Theodore Aylward; Frederick Crowe	Organist and Master of the Choristers of Chichester Cathedral; 1887–1902; 1921-1925	Succeeded by Frederick Crowe; Marmaduke Conway
