= Nicholas Cleobury =

English conductor

Nicholas Cleobury (born 23 June 1950) is an English conductor.

Cleobury was organ scholar at Worcester College, Oxford, conductor of Schola Cantorum of Oxford and held assistant organist posts at Chichester Cathedral and Christ Church, Oxford before turning to orchestral and operatic work. He is founder-laureate of the Britten Sinfonia and has been particularly active in the promotion of contemporary music. He was from 1997 to 2015 principal conductor of the Oxford Bach Choir.

Cleobury's elder brother Stephen was director of music at King's College, Cambridge.

Cleobury joined the Queensland Conservatorium as head of opera in 2016.

Cultural offices
Preceded by Michael Davey	Assistant Organist of Chichester Cathedral; 1971-1972	Succeeded by Ian Fox
