= Frederick Crowe =

English organist (1862–1931)

Frederick Joseph William Crowe FRAS FRHistS (1862–1931) was an English organist.

Frederick Crowe was a chorister and then Assistant Organist of Wells Cathedral. He became Organist of St. Mary Magdelene, Torquay, in 1890. A man of wide and varied interests, Crowe taught at Bishop Otter College of Education and at Chichester School in the Pallants. He was a committed Freemason; astronomy and billiards also occupied his time.

In 1904 he founded a Cathedral Oratorio Society, and later that year was centrally involved in bringing together in Chichester the choirs of Salisbury, Winchester and Chichester for a special service to mark the re-opening of the main organ after its restoration by Hele of Plymouth (this was the start of the Three Choirs Festival, now known as Southern Cathedrals Festival). The gatherings continued until World War I, resumed from 1920 and again from 1960 onwards. It was possibly because of Crowe's West Country connections that Hele was selected to carry out the work on the organ in 1904. He became a Fellow of the Royal Historical Society in 1906.

Crowe's salary on appointment was £150; this had risen to £200 by the time he retired, but Frederick Read was reappointed at £160. Crowe was buried at St. Mary's Church, Rumboldswhyke. In Chichester, a memorial to him is placed in the north transept of the Cathedral.

An Evening Service in E flat survives.

Cultural offices
Preceded by Frederick Read	Organist and Master of the Choristers of Chichester Cathedral; 1902–1921	Succeeded by Frederick Read
