= Thomas Bennett (musician) =

English organist

Thomas Bennett (c. 1784 (Note: Some sources put his year of birth as late as 1789.) – 21 March 1848) was an English organist.

== Career ==
Bennett was a chorister at Salisbury Cathedral under Joseph Corfe. He was Organist and Master of the Choristers of Chichester Cathedral from 1803 and organist at the newly opened St John the Evangelist's Church, Chichester from 1813. His son, Henry R. Bennett succeeded him in both posts, in 1848 and 1849 respectively. Upon Thomas Bennett's appointment at the cathedral, he was placed under probation for 14 years - his overall tenure at Chichester spanned 45 years, the longest serving organist and master of the choristers to date.

Bennett's composed Sacred Melodies (published some time before 1815), which include psalms and hymns. He also wrote the pamphlet, An Introduction to the Art of Singing.

== Notes ==
Cultural offices
Preceded by James Target	Organist and Master of the Choristers of Chichester Cathedral; 1803-1848	Succeeded by Henry R. Bennett
