= Jeremy Suter =

English organist and choral director

Jeremy Suter (born in London) is an English organist and choral director. He was a chorister under Sir William McKie at Westminster Abbey. He attended Harrow and later spent two years at the Royal College of Music before going to Oxford as Organ Scholar of Magdalen College under Bernard Rose. Following a year at the University of Pennsylvania, Jeremy was invited to return to Magdalen College, Oxford, in order to direct the Chapel Choir whilst Bernard Rose took a sabbatical. In 1975 he was appointed Organist of the Civic Church of All Saints', Northampton and Director of Music at All Saints' Middle School. Between 1981 and 1991 he was Assistant Organist at Chichester Cathedral and Director of Music at the Prebendal School. He featured on many broadcasts and recordings made by the Choir of Chichester Cathedral. Since taking up his appointment in 1991 as Master of the Music at Carlisle Cathedral Jeremy has been enhancing the reputation of the Cathedral Choir. Jeremy has been appointed Director of Music of Abbey Singers from January 2001.

Jeremy retired in April 2017. His successor at Carlisle Cathedral is Mark Duthie.

Cultural offices
Preceded by Kenneth Sweetman	Assistant Organist of Chichester Cathedral; 1981-1991	Succeeded by James Thomas
Preceded by Robert Andrew Seivewright	Master of the Music of Carlisle Cathedral; 1991-2017	Succeeded by Mark Duthie
