= William Campion (organist) =

William Campion was the first Organist of Chichester Cathedral mentioned in the cathedral archives, and was paid 6 s. 8 d. for playing the 'organs in the choir' and 3 s. 4 d. for the 'organs in the Lady Chapel' in the last quarter of 1543 and twice again in 1544.

Cultural offices
| Preceded by Office Created | Organist of Chichester Cathedral; 1544 | Succeeded by Thomas Coring |
