= Theodore Aylward =

Theodore Edward Aylward (Jr.) (1844–1933), was born in Salisbury and later became a pupil of S. S. Wesley and was Organist of St. Matthew's Church, Cheltenham, St. Columba's College, Rathfarnham (1866) and St. Martin's, Salisbury, before succeeding Francis Edward Gladstone at Llandaff Cathedral in 1870.

He was recommended to the Dean and Chapter of Chichester Cathedral by Walter Parratt (then Organist of Magdalen College, Oxford) after stringent competition, and was therefore appointed Organist and Master of the Choristers at Chichester Cathedral.

In 1886, Aylward left Chichester and was appointed Organist of the Public Hall, and of St. Andrew's Church in Cardiff. He is often confused with his great great uncle, Theodore Aylward Sr., sometime Organist & Master of the Choristers of St. George's Chapel, Windsor.

Preceded by Francis Edward Gladstone	Organist and Master of the Choristers, Llandaff Cathedral; 1870 – 1876	Succeeded by Charles Lee Williams
Preceded by Daniel Joseph Wood	Organist and Master of the Choristers, Chichester Cathedral; 1876 – 1886	Succeeded by Frederick Read
