= Marmaduke Conway =

English organist and writer

Marmaduke Percy Conway, FRCO, ARCM (1885–1961), was an English organist and writer.

== Education ==
Conway was educated at Bedford School and the Royal College of Music, obtaining a B.Mus in Oxford and a Mus.D in Dublin.

== Organist ==
He later became Organist of All Saints', Eastbourne in 1908, and St. Andrew's, Wells Street, London, in 1917. Four years as Assistant Organist of Wells Cathedral led him to Chichester. In 1931 he left Chichester to become Organist of Ely Cathedral. He retired in 1949. It was during Conway's time as Organist of Chichester Cathedral that an electric blowing apparatus was provided for the Cathedral organ. The blower was housed in the room off the north transept, now known as the Plant Room, and the wind was conveyed through to the organ via an underground conduit still in existence.

== Author ==
He was an accomplished author of books and articles on organ technique.

- Playing a Church Organ (1949) London: Latimer House Ltd

Cultural offices
Preceded by Hubert Stanley Middleton	Organist and Master of the Choristers of Ely Cathedral; 1931–1949	Succeeded by Sidney Campbell
Preceded by Frederick Read	Organist and Master of the Choristers of Chichester Cathedral; 1925–1931	Succeeded by Harvey Grace
