= John Birch (musician) =

British organist and choral director (1929–2012)

- Born: 9 July 1929
- Died: 28 April 2012 (aged 82)
- Education: Trent College, Royal College of Music
- Occupation: Musician

John Anthony Birch (9 July 1929 – 28 April 2012) was a British organist and choral director.

He was educated at Trent College, Derbyshire and left in July 1947 to study at the Royal College of Music, London. In 1953 he became organist and master of the choristers at a prominent Anglo-Catholic church: All Saints, Margaret Street, London. In 1958 Birch moved to Chichester to be organist and master of the choristers at Chichester Cathedral. During his time at the cathedral, he worked closely with Dean Walter Hussey in the commissioning of new choral works for the cathedral choir, including pieces from composers Leonard Bernstein, William Walton, Lennox Berkeley, William Albright, Bryan Kelly and Herbert Howells.

In 1959, Birch was appointed as a professor of organ at the Royal College of Music, where he continued to lecture until 1997. He was one of the founders of the revived Southern Cathedrals Festival (with his colleagues at Salisbury and Winchester Cathedrals) in 1960.

Birch was University Organist at the University of Sussex from 1967 to 1994 and worked as a Visiting Lecturer in Music from 1971 to 1983. His pupils included organists Simon Lindley and Stuart Nicholson, tenor Rogers Covey-Crump, and composers Adrian Jack and Robert Prizeman.

In 1982, Birch became Director of Music at Temple Church. Two years later, he was appointed to the role of Curator-Organist at the Royal Albert Hall, a position he held until his death. In the posts at the Temple Church and the Royal Albert Hall, Dr Birch was the successor to Sir George Thalben-Ball. Birch was, in addition, the long-serving organist for the Royal Philharmonic Orchestra and recorded widely, particularly in orchestral repertoire. He had, earlier, served with great distinction as accompanist and organist to the Royal Choral Society working closely with Sir Malcolm Sargent.

John Birch held an honorary MA from the University of Sussex and the Lambeth degree of Doctor of Music.

John Birch died on 28 April 2012 aged 82 after suffering a stroke.

Cultural offices
| Preceded by Horace Hawkins | Organist and Master of the Choristers of Chichester Cathedral; 1958–1980 | Succeeded by Alan Thurlow |
