= Siege of Chichester =

Part of the First English Civil War

Coordinates: 50.8365°N 0.7792°W

- Part of the First English Civil War
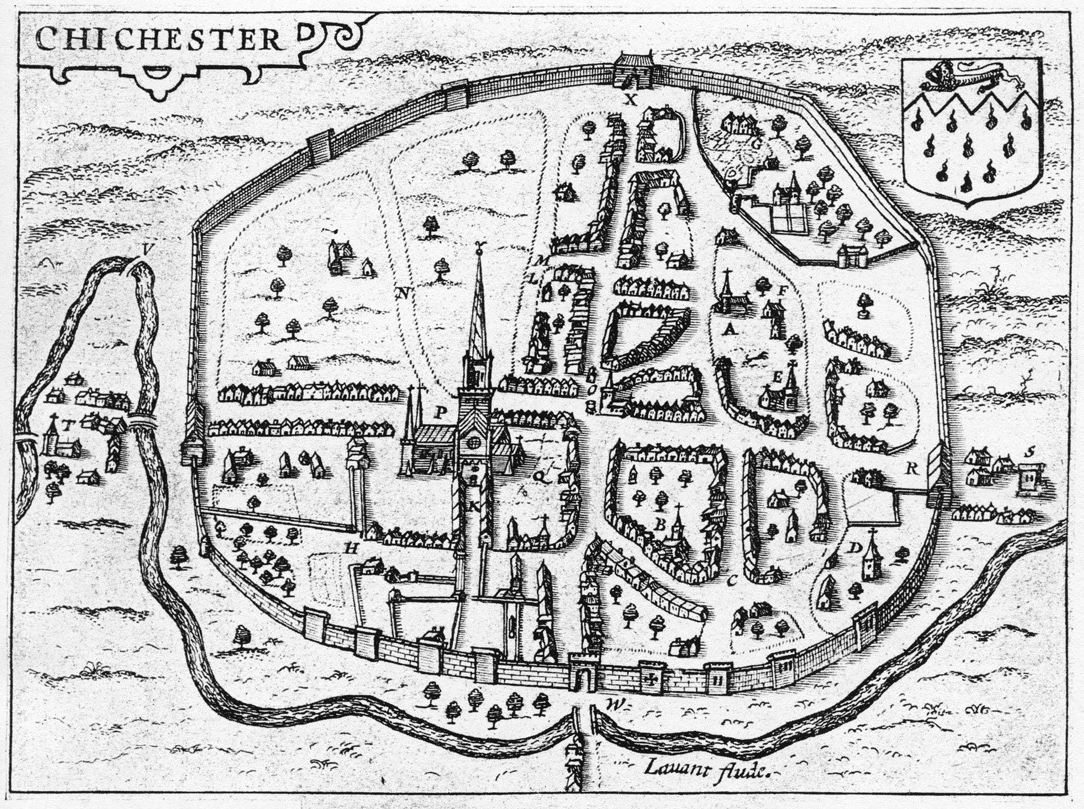
- Chichester in 1610 – 32 years before the siege
Date	22–27 December 1642
Location	Chichester, England
Result	Parliamentarian victory

Belligerents
Royalists	(Kingdom of England) Parliamentarians

Commanders and leaders
John Morley (surrendered); Edward Ford (surrendered)	William Waller; Michael Livesey

Strength
Unknown	Unknown

Casualties and losses
Low	Low
- The location of Chichester within West Sussex

The siege of Chichester was a victory by Parliamentarian forces led by Colonel William Waller over a small Royalist garrison. The siege was one of the key events in the First English Civil War by Waller to secure southern England and declare it for Parliament. The siege lasted five days and ended with surrender by the Royalists. Despite the Royalist surrender, Waller's troops proceeded to sack and desecrate Chichester Cathedral.

== Background ==
On 16 August 1642 shortly before the beginning of the civil war, William Cawley, a Member of Parliament for Chichester and Midhurst issued the 'Valiant Resolution,' which declared that the city would support the Parliament, rather than King Charles.

This resolution, however, was not an official declaration and several Royalists in Chichester and Sussex took actions to gain control of the city for the King. First, the Mayor of Chichester, Robert Exton responded by issuing a Royal Commission of Array, which called upon all able-bodied men to take up arms for the King. Soon thereafter, Exton's successor, William Bartholomew, obtained ordnance from Portsmouth and soldiers from the Sussex Militia. The Governor of Portsmouth, Sir William Lewis sent seven guns and ten barrels of powder to the Royalists in November. Finally William Morley and Edward Ford, the High sheriff of Sussex, raised a small army and drove Cawley and his Parliamentarian supporters from the city on 15 November.

== The siege ==
Waller's force arrived at Chichester on 21 December where he was joined by a contingent of Parliamentary cavalry commanded by Sir Michael Livesey. The Royalists sent a small force out to confront the Parliamentarians but were repulsed and returned into the city. After the area was secure, Waller began to move his siege artillery into position while simultaneously calling upon the Royalist garrison to surrender. The next morning after his terms of surrender had been rejected, Waller began to bombard the city.

Over the next few days, Waller continued the bombardment, moving his artillery closer to the city as he took greater control of the area outside the city walls. Just as Waller was preparing to attack the walls from three different directions, the Royalists asked to reconsider the terms of surrender. An agreement was reached and the Royalist garrison surrendered on 27 December. Because Morley surrendered the city it was not sacked as had been done elsewhere; nevertheless, Waller allowed his men to sack and desecrate the city's cathedral.
