= List of organists =

The following is a list of notable organists from the past and present who perform organ literature.

== Living organists ==
=== Australia ===
- David Drury (born 1961)
- Douglas Lawrence (born 1943)
- Graeme Morton
- Christopher Wrench (born 1958)

=== Austria ===
- Martin Haselböck (born 1954)
- Brett Leighton (born 1955)
- Matthias Maierhofer (born 1979)
- Peter Planyavsky (born 1947)

=== Belgium ===
- Jan Van Landeghem (born 1954)
- Ignace Michiels (born 1963)
- Luc Ponet (born 1959)

=== Bulgaria ===
- Alexandra Fol (born 1981)
- Neva Krysteva (born 1946)

=== Canada ===
- Denis Bédard (born 1950)
- Desmond Gaspar (born 1970)
- Paul Halley (born 1952)
- Rachel Mahon (born 1989)
- John Tuttle (born 1946)

=== Croatia ===
- Ivan Božičević (born 1961)
- Pavao Mašić (born 1980)

=== Czech Republic ===
- Pavel Kohout (born 1976)

=== Denmark ===
- Frederik Magle (born 1977)

=== France ===
- Michel Bouvard (born 1958)
- Sophie-Véronique Cauchefer-Choplin (born 1959)
- Thierry Escaich (born 1965)
- Jérôme Faucheur (born 1953)
- Naji Hakim (born 1955)
- Olivier Latry (born 1962)
- Jean-Pierre Leguay (born 1939)
- Michael Matthes (born 1966)
- Thierry Mechler (born 1962)
- Daniel Roth (born 1942)
- Nariné Simonian (born 1966)
- Marina Tchebourkina (born 1965)
- Johann Vexo (born 1978)

=== Germany ===
- Daniel Beckmann (born 1980)
- Andreas Boltz (born 1964)
- Winfried Bönig (born 1959)
- Gabriel Dessauer (born 1955)
- Matthias Eisenberg (born 1956)
- Stefan Engels (born 1967)
- Zsolt Gárdonyi (born 1946)
- Felix Hell (born 1985)
- Hans Uwe Hielscher (born 1945)
- Rudolf Kelber (born 1948)
- Helmut Kickton (born 1956)
- Otto Maria Krämer (born 1964)
- Edgar Krapp (born 1947)
- Ludger Lohmann (born 1954)
- Petra Morath-Pusinelli (born 1967)
- Mathias Rehfeldt (born 1986)
- Wolfgang Rübsam (born 1946)
- Wolfgang Seifen (born 1956)
- Ludger Stühlmeyer (born 1961)
- Zsigmond Szathmáry (born 1939)
- Elke Voelker (born 1968)
- Harald Vogel (born 1941)
- Martin Welzel (born 1972)
- Hans-André Stamm (born 1958)

=== Hungary ===
- Laszlo Fassang (born 1973)
- Bálint Karosi (born 1979)
- Balázs Szabó (born 1985)
- Xavér Varnus (born 1964)
- Zsolt Kiss (born 1979)

=== Italy ===
- Simone Stella (born 1981)
- Arturo Sacchetti (born 1941)
- Andrea Gobbi Frattini (born 1992)

=== Ireland ===
- Gerard Gillen (born 1942)
- Ronan Murray (born 1977)

=== Latvia ===
- Iveta Apkalna (born 1976)
- Aivars Kalējs (born 1951)
- Jevgenija Lisicina (born 1942)
- Ilze Reine (born 1970)

=== Monaco (Principality) ===
- Marc Giacone (born 1954)

=== Netherlands ===
- Arjan Breukhoven (born 1962)
- Christine Kamp (born 1966)
- Ton Koopman (born 1944)
- Ben van Oosten (born 1955)
- Willem van Twillert (born 1952)
- Jan Verschuren (born 1962)
- Sietze de Vries (born 1973)

=== New Zealand ===
- Douglas Mews (born 1956)

=== Norway ===
- Jon Laukvik (born 1952)
- Kåre Nordstoga (born 1954)
- Iver Kleive (born 1949)

=== Philippines ===
- Armando Salarza (born 1966)

=== Poland ===
- Krzysztof Czerwiński (born 1980)

=== Russia ===
- Marina Tchebourkina (born 1965)

=== Singapore ===
- Evelyn Lim

=== South Africa ===
- Barry Smith (born 1939)

=== Spain ===
- Montserrat Torrent i Serra (born 1926)

=== Sweden ===
- Hans Davidsson (born 1958)
- Hans-Ola Ericsson (born 1958)
- Hans Fagius (born 1951)

=== Switzerland ===
- Guy Bovet (born 1942)
- Lionel Rogg (born 1936)
- Bernhard Ruchti (born 1974)

=== United Kingdom ===
- James Anderson-Besant (born 1998)
- Charles Andrews (born 1989)
- Malcolm Archer (born 1952)
- Martin Baker (born 1967)
- Sarah Baldock (born 1975)
- Harry Bramma (1936–2026)
- Kerry Beaumont (born 1957)
- Jonathan Bielby (born 1944)
- Kevin Bowyer (born 1961)
- David Briggs (born 1962)
- John Butt (born 1960)
- Andrew Cantrill
- Ralph Cupper (born 1954)
- Stephen Darlington (born 1952)
- Katherine Dienes (born 1970)
- Clive Driskill-Smith (born 1978)
- Henry Fairs (born 1976)
- Stephen Farr (born 1967)
- Jeremy Filsell (born 1964)
- David Goode (born 1971)
- Christopher Gray
- Claudia Grinnell
- Charles Harrison (born 1974)
- Christopher Herrick (born 1942)
- David Hill (born 1957)
- Daniel Hyde (born 1980)
- Rupert Jeffcoat (born 1970)
- John Kitchen (born 1950)
- James Lancelot (born 1952)
- Anna Lapwood (born 1995)
- Adrian Lucas (born 1962)
- Sarah MacDonald (born 1968)
- Wayne Marshall (born 1961)
- Roy Massey (born 1934)
- Andrew Millington (born 1952)
- Philip Moore (born 1943)
- Greg Morris (born 1976)
- Daniel Moult (born 1973)
- Peter Nardone (born 1965)
- Andrew Nethsingha (born 1968)
- Michael Nicholas (born 1938)
- James O'Donnell (born 1961)
- Nigel Ogden (born 1954)
- Adrian Partington (born 1958)
- David Price (born 1969)
- Tim Rishton
- Barry Rose (born 1934)
- Roger Sayer (born 1961)
- Gordon Stewart (born 1952)
- Jeremy Suter
- Richard Tanner
- Anne Marsden Thomas (born 1948)
- Alan Thurlow (born 1947)
- Ian Tracey (born 1955)
- Thomas Trotter (born 1957)
- Colin Walsh (born 1955)
- Mark Wardell (born 1968)
- Gillian Weir (born 1941)
- John Scott Whiteley (born 1950)
- Marcus Wibberley (born 1981)
- Carol Williams (born 1962)
- Alan Wilson (born 1947)

=== United States ===
- George C. Baker (born 1951)
- Robert Bardwell
- Diane Meredith Belcher (born 1960)
- James Biery (born 1956)
- Diane Bish (born 1941)
- Grace Brummel (born 1930)
- Cameron Carpenter (born 1981)
- Chelsea Chen (born 1983)
- Alcée Chriss III (born 1983)
- Clay Christiansen (born 1949)
- James David Christie (born 1952)
- Twinkie Clark (born 1954)
- Ken Cowan (born 1974)
- David Dahl (born 1937)
- Richard Elliott (born 1957)
- Martin Ellis (born 1968)
- Larry Ferrari (1932-1997)
- Jeremy Filsell (born 1964)
- Alexander Frey
- Barbara Harbach (born 1946)
- David Hegarty (born 1945)
- Cory Henry (born 1987)
- David Higgs
- Christopher Houlihan (born 1987)
- Paul Jacobs (born 1977)
- Dennis James (born 1950)
- Martin Jean (born 1960)
- Bálint Karosi (born 1979)
- James Kibbie (born 1949)
- Peter Krasinski (born 1957)
- Nathan Laube (born 1988)
- Joan Lippincott (born 1935)
- John Longhurst (born 1940)
- Douglas Major (born 1953)
- Haig Mardirosian (born 1947)
- Haruhito Miyagi (born 1976)
- Alan Morrison (born 1968)
- Thomas Murray (born 1943)
- Anthony Newman (born 1941)
- Karel Paukert (born 1935)
- William Porter (born 1946)
- George Ritchie
- Catherine Rodland
- Wolfgang Rübsam (born 1946)
- Geoffrey Simon (born 1946)
- Carole Terry (born 1948)
- Kent Tritle (born 1960)
- Andrew E. Unsworth (active from 2001)
- Guy Whatley (born 1975)
- Carol Williams (born 1962)
- Todd Wilson (born 1971)

== Deceased organists ==
=== Austria ===
- Anton Bruckner (1824–1896)
- Hans Haselböck (1928–1954)
- Susi Jeans (1911–1993)

=== Belgium ===
- Jacques-Nicolas (Jaak-Nicolaas) Lemmens (1823–1881)

=== Canada ===
- Gerald Bales (1919–2002)
- H. Hugh Bancroft (1904–1988)
- Gérard Caron (1916–1986)
- Douglas Clarke (1893–1962)
- Antoine Dessane (1826–1873)
- Christopher Jackson (1948–2015)
- Rachel Laurin (1961–2023)
- Ernest MacMillan (1893–1973)
- Theodore Frederic Molt (1795–1856)
- Charles Peaker (1899–1978)
- Healey Willan (1880–1968)

=== Czech republic (Bohemia) ===
- František Xaver Brixi (1732–1771)
- Bohuslav Matej Cernohorsky (1684–1742)
- Petr Eben (1929–2007)
- Josef Seger (1716–1782)

=== Denmark ===
- Grethe Krogh (1928–2018)
- Mogens Wöldike (1897–1988)

=== Finland ===
- Kalevi Kiviniemi (1958–2024)

=== France ===
- Jehan Alain (1911–1940)
- Marie-Claire Alain (1926–2013)
- Charles-Valentin Alkan (1813–1888)
- Augustin Barié (1883–1915)
- Léon Boëllmann (1862–1897)
- Joseph Bonnet (1884–1944)
- Michel Chapuis (1930–2017)
- Pierre Cochereau (1924–1984)
- Edouard Commette (1883–1967)
- Marie-Anne Couperin (born 1677)
- Jeanne Demessieux (1921–1968)
- Théodore Dubois (1837–1924)
- Marcel Dupré (1886–1971)
- Maurice Duruflé (1902–1986)
- Rolande Falcinelli (1920–2006)
- André Fleury (1903–1995)
- César Franck (1822–1890), from Belgium
- Eugène Gigout (1844–1925)
- Jean Guillou (1930–2019)
- Alexandre Guilmant (1837–1911)
- André Isoir (1935–2016)
- Jean Langlais (1907–1991)
- Marcel Lanquetuit (1894–1985)
- Gaston Litaize (1909–1991)
- Paul de Maleingreau (1887–1956)
- Olivier Messiaen (1908–1992)
- Henri Mulet (1878–1967)
- Pierre Pincemaille (1956–2018)
- René Saorgin (1928–2015)
- Camille Saint-Saëns (1835–1921)
- Albert Schweitzer (1875–1965)
- Louis Thiry (1935–2019)
- Charles Tournemire (1870–1939)
- Louis Vierne (1870–1937)
- Charles-Marie Widor (1844–1937)

=== Germany ===
- Johann Sebastian Bach (1685–1750)
- Joseph Siegmund Bachmann (1754–1825)
- Clemens Ganz (1935–2023)
- Melchior Hoffmann (1679–1715)
- Gottfried August Homilius (1714–1785)
- Franz Lehrndorfer (1928–2013)
- Theodor Pröpper (1896–1979)
- Karl Richter (1926–1981)
- Karl Straube (1873–1956)
- Käte van Tricht (1909–1996)
- Helmut Walcha (1907–1991)
- Gerd Zacher (1929–2014)

=== Hungary ===
- Franz Liszt (1811–1886)
- János Sebestyén (1931–2012)

=== Italy ===
- Costanzo Antegnati (1549–1624)
- Marco Enrico Bossi (1861–1925)
- Girolamo Frescobaldi (1583–1643)
- Carlo Giorgio Garofalo (1886–1962)
- Fernando Germani (1906–1998)
- Michelangelo Rossi (1601–1656)
- Luigi Ferdinando Tagliavini (1929–2017)

=== Netherlands ===
- Willem Bartholomeus (1825–1892)
- Klaas Bolt (1927–1990)
- Piet Kee (1927–2018)
- Ewald Kooiman (1938–2009)
- Gustav Leonhardt (1928–2012)
- Liuwe Tamminga (1953–2021)

=== Nigeria ===
- Fela Sowande (1905–1987)

=== Slovenia ===
- Celestina Ekel (1867–1935)
- Josipina Eleonora Hudovernik (1863–1945)
- Ana Roner Lavrič (1869–1957)
- Antonija Premrov (1912–1949)

=== Spain ===
- Joan Aulí (1796–1869)

=== Sweden ===
- Harald Fryklöf (1882–1918)
- Charlotte von Schéele (1840–1929)
- Ferdinand Zellbell the Younger (1719–1780)

=== Switzerland ===
- Alfred Baum (1904–1993)
- Daniel Chorzempa (1944–2023)
- Fridolin Sicher (1490–1546)

=== United Kingdom ===
- Walter Alcock (1861–1947)
- Edward Bairstow (1874–1946)
- Jennifer Bate (1944–2020)
- E. Power Biggs (1906–1977) (Note: Born in Essex, England. Immigrated to US in 1930.)
- John Birch (1929–2012)
- Hugh Blair (1864–1932)
- Jonathan Blewitt (1782–1853)
- Graham Blyth (1948–2024)
- Herbert Brewer (1865–1928)
- William Hutchins Callcott (1807–1882)
- William Carnaby (1772–1839)
- Stephen Cleobury (1948–2019)
- Norman Cocker (1889–1953)
- Marmaduke Conway (1885–1961)
- Melville Cook (1912–1993)
- Robert Cooke (1768–1814)
- Arthur Thomas Corfe (1773–1863)
- Joseph Corfe (1740–1820)
- G. D. Cunningham (1878–1948)
- Lionel Dakers (1924–2003)
- Nicholas Danby (1935–1997)
- Harold Darke (1888–1976)
- Christopher Dearnley (1930–2000)
- Ralph Downes (1904–1993)
- John Dykes Bower (1905–1981)
- Catherine Ennis (1955–2020)
- Roger Fisher (1936–2021)
- Alfred Robert Gaul (1837–1913)
- Harvey Grace (1874–1944)
- Douglas Guest (1916–1996)
- Joseph John Harris (1799–1869)
- William Henry Harris (1883–1973)
- Joseph Binns Hart (1794–1844)
- Philip Hart (died 1749)
- Basil Harwood (1859–1949)
- James Hawkins (1662–1729)
- Edward Heath (1916–2005)
- James Heseltine (1690–1763)
- John Larkin Hopkins (1819–1873)
- Martin How (1931–2022)
- Michael Howard (1922–2002)
- Herbert Howells (1892–1983)
- Peter Hurford (1930–2019)
- Donald Hunt (1930–2018)
- Randolph Jewett (1602–1675)
- John Keeble (1711–1786)
- Joseph Kelway (1702–1782)
- Thomas Kelway (c. 1695 – 1744)
- Philip Knapton (1788–1833)
- Gerald Knight (1908–1979)
- Nicolas Kynaston (1941–2025)
- George Jackson Lambert (1794–1880)
- Richard Langdon (1729–1803)
- Philip Ledger (1937–2012)
- Henry Ley (1904–1993)
- Simon Lindley (1948–2025)
- Richard Hey Lloyd (1933–2021)
- William Henry Longhurst (1819–1904)
- Albert Mallinson (1870–1946)
- Colin Mawby (1936–2019)
- William Henry Monk (1823–1889)
- Martin Neary (1940–2025)
- Lucian Nethsingha (1936–2021)
- Boris Ord (1897–1961)
- Jane Parker-Smith (1950–2020)
- John Parsons (1563–1623)
- Martin Peerson (c. 1572 – c. 1650)
- Josiah Pittman (1816–1886)
- Simon Preston (1938–2022)
- Henry Purcell (1659–1695)
- James Kendrick Pyne (1852–1938)
- Noel Rawsthorne (1929–2019)
- Vaughan Richardson (died 1729)
- John Robinson (1682–1762)
- Brian Runnett (1935–1970)
- John Sanders (1933–2003)
- David Sanger (1947–2010)
- John Scott (1956–2015)
- Bruce Steane (1866–1938)
- Haldane Campbell Stewart (1868–1942)
- Herbert Sumsion (1899–1995)
- Christopher Tambling (1964–2015)
- George Thalben-Ball (1896–1987)
- John Tomkins (1586–1638)
- Stanley Vann (1910–2010)
- William Litton Viner (1790–1867)
- Henry Walford Davies (1869–1941)
- Thomas Forbes Walmisley (1783–1866)
- Samuel Wesley (1766–1837)
- Samuel Sebastian Wesley (1810–1876)
- John Webster (died 1974)
- Henry Westrop (1812–1879)
- Allan Wicks (1923–2010)
- Frederick Wilson Whitehead (1863–1926)
- David Willcocks (1919–2015)
- Arthur Wills (1926–2020)

=== United States ===
- Frank W. Asper (1892–1973)
- Herman Berlinski (1910–2010) (Note: Born in Leipzig, Germany. Immigrated to US in 1941.)
- Leon Berry (1914–1996)
- E. Power Biggs (1906–1977)
- David Boe (1936–2020)
- Del Castillo (1893–1992)
- Catharine Crozier (1914–2003)
- Carlo Curley (1952–2012)
- Garth Edmundson (1892–1971)
- Richard Ellsasser (1926–1972)
- Dan Federici (1950–2008)
- Charles B. Fisk (1925–1983)
- Virgil Fox (1912–1980)
- Charles Henry Galloway (1871–1931)
- Harvey Bartlett Gaul (1881–1945)
- Robert Glasgow (1925–2008)
- Gladys Goodding (1893–1963)
- Gerre Hancock (1934–2012)
- Eddie Layton (1925–2004)
- Leonard MacClain (1899–1967)
- Byron Melcher (1929–2012)
- Michael Murray (1943–2024)
- T. Tertius Noble (1867–1953)
- Barbara Owen (1933–2024)
- Richard Purvis (1913–1994)
- James Thomas Quarles (1877–1954)
- Alexander Schreiner (1901–1987)
- John Serry, Sr. (1915–2003)
- Leo Sowerby (1895–1968)
- Frank Speller (1938–2017)
- Frederick Swann (1931–2022)
- Carl Weinrich (1904–1991)
- Berj Zamkochian (1929–2004)

== See also ==
- List of organ composers
- Organist
- Organ repertoire
- Organ recital
- Pipe organ
