= Martin Welzel =

German organist, musicologist and academic teacher

- Born: 11 November 1972 (age 53); Vechta, Germany
- Education: Hochschule für Musik Saar; University of Washington
- Occupations: Organist; Academic teacher
- Organizations: Catholic Parish, Wil; Diözesane Kirchenmusikschule St. Gallen
- Website: www.martinwelzel.ch/en/

Martin Welzel (born 11 November 1972, in Vechta) is a German organist, musicologist, and pedagogue based in Switzerland.

== Biography ==
Martin Welzel received his first musical training in Bremen, where his teachers included Michael Landsky, Kirchenmusikdirektor Wilfried Langosz, and former Bremen Cathedral organist Käte van Tricht, a student of Karl Straube.

From 1993 to 2001, he studied Catholic church music at the Hochschule für Musik Saar in Saarbrücken. His teachers included Daniel Roth and Wolfgang Rübsam (organ), Andreas Göpfert and Wolfgang Helbich (choral conducting), Kristin Merscher (piano), and Gerald Hambitzer (harpsichord). He received the B-Diplom in Catholic church music in 1997 and the A-Diplom in 1999. In the same year, he received the Konzertreife in organ performance with distinction, followed by the Solistendiplom in organ performance in 2001.

Welzel subsequently studied organ and harpsichord with Carole Terry in Seattle. In 2005, he received a Doctor of Musical Arts degree from the University of Washington with a dissertation on the French organist and composer Jeanne Demessieux. During his graduate studies, he was the recipient of an Ambassadorial Scholarship from the Rotary Foundation.

From 2006 to 2007, Welzel held an interim professorship in organ at the Hochschule für Musik Saar. From 2017 to 2021, he was a lecturer in practical piano skills for music education at LMU Munich. From 2013 to 2021, he was an associate organist at the Theatine Church and Munich Cathedral; from November 2021 to August 2022, he served as acting Cathedral Organist at Munich Cathedral.

As a concert artist, Welzel has performed throughout Europe, as well as in Russia, South Africa, and the United States. For Naxos, he recorded three CDs of organ works by Max Reger at Trier Cathedral, released in 2005, 2008, and 2010.

In 2023, Welzel was appointed principal organist at the Catholic Parish in Wil, Switzerland. He is also artistic director of the concert series "toccatawil". He teaches organ performance, organ improvisation, and hymn playing at the Diözesane Kirchenmusikschule in St. Gallen, where he heads the Organ Department.

== Discography ==
- Max Reger: Organ Works, Vol. 6. Chorale Fantasia on "Alle Menschen müssen sterben," op. 52, No. 1. Six Trios, op. 47. Variations and Fugue on an Original Theme, op. 73. Naxos 8.557338 (2005).
- Max Reger: Organ Works, Vol. 8. Chorale Fantasia on "Ein feste Burg ist unser Gott," op. 27. Twelve Pieces, op. 80, Nos. 7 and 8. 30 Little Chorale Preludes, op. 135a, Nos. 11–30. Prelude and Fugue in F-sharp minor (from op. 82, Vol. IV). Romance in A minor, WoO IV/11. Introduction and Passacaglia in D minor, WoO IV/6. Naxos 8.570455 (2008).
- Max Reger: Organ Works, Vol. 10. Prelude and Fugue in E minor, op. 85, No. 4. 52 Easy Chorale Preludes, op. 67, Nos. 39–52. Prelude and Fugue in G-sharp minor, WoO IV/15. Chorale Fantasia on "Freu dich sehr, o meine Seele," op. 30. Naxos 8.570960 (2010).

== Bibliography ==
- Jeanne Demessieux (1921–1968): A Critical Examination of Her Life. DMA dissertation, University of Washington, 2005. ProQuest Dissertations & Theses Global, Publication No. 3178169.
- Petr Eben. Das Orgelwerk. Musik & Ästhetik, vol. 13, no. 50 (2009), pp. 109–112.
- Organist an Notre-Dame de Paris. Eine Erinnerung an Pierre Cochereau (1924–1984) – zum 90. Geburtstag und 30. Todestag. Organ – Journal für die Orgel, vol. 17, no. 4 (2014), pp. 42–45.
- Pierre Cochereau. Eine Würdigung zum 100. Geburtstag und 40. Todestag. Musica sacra, vol. 144, no. 5 (2024), pp. 296–297.
- Die Mathis-Orgel (2024) in der Wallfahrtskirche Maria Dreibrunnen. Bulletin St. Galler Orgelfreunde, vol. 44, no. 2 (2026), pp. 4–6. (available online, in German).

== See also ==
- List of organists
