= Robert Theodore Anderson =

American organist, composer and pedagogue

Robert Theodore Anderson (October 5, 1934 – May 29, 2009) was an American organist, composer and pedagogue.

== Biography ==
Anderson was born on October 5, 1934, in Chicago. He received his musical training at the American Conservatory of Music in Chicago (Piano) and at Illinois Wesleyan University in Bloomington, Illinois (Bachelor's Degree in organ performance with Lillian Mecherle McCord). Further studies followed at the Union Theological Seminary in New York City (Master's and Doctoral Degrees in Sacred Music, 1957 and 1961) and (through a Fulbright scholarship) 1957–1959 with Helmut Walcha in Frankfurt am Main. In addition, Anderson studied organ with Heinrich Fleischer and Frederick Marriott, composition with Harold Friedell and Seth Bingham and harpsichord with Maria Jager. Beginning in 1960, he served as Professor of Organ and Sacred Music at Southern Methodist University and as organist of the University Chapel and Perkins School of Theology, Southern Methodist University, Dallas, Texas, until his retirement in 1997.

He wrote numerous compositions for organ solo, including a Triptych (1958), as well as a cantata, "Garden of Gethsemane," after a text by Boris Pasternak.

Anderson was organ consultant for some of the finest concert hall organs in North America: the C. B. Fisk organs at Meyerson Symphony Center (Opus 100, 1992) and SMU's Caruth Auditorium (Opus 101, 1993), both in Dallas, TX. He also initiated the prestigious Dallas International Organ Competition, of which he was chair in 1997 and 2000.

As a concert organist, he played numerous recitals in the United States and Europe and was invited to leading organ festivals in Nuremberg, Paris, Berlin and Vienna. He was the featured organist at the 1977 International Contemporary Organ Music Festival at the Hartt School of Music. He was one of the leading organ teachers of his time in the United States. Among his more than 100 former students were organists such as Stefan Engels, George C. Baker, Ignace Michiels, Carole Terry and Wolfgang Rübsam.

Robert Anderson died in Honolulu in 2009.

== Discography ==
- The C. B. Fisk Organ, Opus 101, at Southern Methodist University.
- Works of Grigny (Pange lingua), Tournemire (Paraphrase-Carillon), Zwillich (Praeludium), Buxtehude (Praeludium in A Major, BuxWV 151), Bach (Trio Sonata VI in G Major, BWV 530) and Reger (Chorale Fantasia on "Wachet auf, ruft uns die Stimme", op. 52, No. 2).
- Robert T. Anderson (Grigny, Tournemire, Zwillich) und Wolfgang Rübsam (Buxtehude, Bach, Reger), organ. Recorded in June 1994 (Anderson) and July 1994 (Rübsam) on the C. B. Fisk organ at Caruth Auditorium, Southern Methodist University in Dallas, Texas. Valparaiso, IN: RMC Classics, 1994. 1 CD.

== Bibliography ==
- Shulman, Laurie. "Opus 100: The Lay Family Concert Organ". In The Meyerson Symphony Center. Building a Dream. Denton, TX: University of North Texas, 2000, 304–322.
