= Chriss (surname) =

Chriss is a surname. Notable Americans with it include:

- Alcée Chriss III, organist, composer and conductor
- Marquese Chriss (born 1997), basketball player
- Neil Chriss (born 1967), mathematician and investor
- Zeon Chriss, football player
