= Elke Voelker =

Elke Voelker (born April 3, 1968, in Lampertheim, Hesse) is a German organist, church musician and musicologist.

== Biography ==
Elke Voelker studied organ, church music, German and Roman languages and musicology at the universities of Mannheim, Mainz and Heidelberg. Among her teachers were Leo Krämer, Mathias Breitschaft, Ludwig Finscher.

A scholarship allowed her to study abroad with Wolfgang Rübsam (Chicago), Nicolas Kynaston (London), Michelle Leclerc (Schola Cantorum de Paris), Jean Guillou and Daniel Roth.

1996-2008 Voelker worked as Choir Organist and Cathedral Music Associate at the UNESCO Heritage St. Marys Imperial Cathedral of Speyer. 2009 she was nominated Interims Music Director and Cathedral Organist. Voelker maintains an active international concert schedule and teaching career.

She is member of the English Karg-Elert Archive, of the German Gesellschaft der Orgelfreunde (GdO), the American Guild of Organists and Honorary Member of the Associazione Organistica Siciliana. Besides this, she is Founder and Artistic Director of the “Internationaler Orgelherbst Deidesheim” and of the Russian "International Organ Festival Philharmony Perm".

== Prizes and awards ==
- 1995: First Prize and Audience Prize "International Organ Competition Speyer Cathedral"
- 1999: Finalist at the "Concours International d'Orgue de la Ville de Paris"; Medaille de la Ville de Paris.
- 2001: Scholar of the Rotary International Foundation
- 2002: Third Prize "International Organ Competition Erfurt"
- 2003 und 2004: Diapason Awards 5 for her recordings Karg-Elert Vol.2 and Vol.3
- 2007: Répertoire 9 for Karg-Elert Vol.5; Paul Harris Fellow Medal of Rotary International

== Articles ==
Voelker published numerous articles in Musik in Gegenwart und Geschichte (Bärenreiter), in ORGAN - Journal für die Orgel (Schott) and in Lexikon der Orgel (Laaber).

== Discography ==
- 1997: Scherzo, Skizze, Tanz. Motette
- 1999: Sigfrid Karg-Elert: Ultimate Organ Works, Vol.1. Aeolus
- 2002: Sigfrid Karg-Elert: Ultimate Organ Works, Vol.2. Aeolus.
- 2003: Noëls d' Orgue du Postromantisme français, Aeolus.
- 2004: Sigfrid Karg-Elert: Ultimate Organ Works, Vol.3. Aeolus.
- 2006: Sigfrid Karg-Elert: Ultimate Organ Works, Vol.5. Aeolus. (Choralimprovisations Vol. 1 and 2)
- 2008. Sigfrid Karg-Elert: Ultimate Organ Works, Vol.4. Aeolus.
- 2010: Sigfrid Karg-Elert: Ultimate Organ Works, Vol.6. Aeolus. (Choralimprovisations Vol. 3 and 4)
- 2014: Sigfrid Karg-Elert: Ultimate Organ Works, Vol.7. Aeolus. (Choralimprovisations Vol. 5 and 6)
- 2014: Sigfrid Karg-Elert: Ultimate Organ Works, Vol.8. Aeolus.
- 2017: César Franck: Franck avant César Franck. Aeolus.
