= Jane Parker-Smith =

British classical organist (1950–2020)

Background information
- Born: 20 May 1950; Northampton, United Kingdom
- Died: 24 June 2020 (aged 70) London, United Kingdom
- Instrument: Organ

Jane Caroline Rebecca Parker-Smith (20 May 1950 – 24 June 2020) was a British classical organist. Her obituary in The Guardian said she had "a stellar international career, popular with audiences for her wide-ranging sympathies and jaw-dropping virtuosity".

== Career ==
Jane Caroline Rebecca Smith was born on 20 May 1950 in Northampton and moved soon after to Hampshire where she was educated at Barton Peveril Grammar School in Eastleigh. She then studied at the Royal College of Music, at first taking piano, cello and harpsichord before changing to the organ. She used the name Parker-Smith professionally from her debut recital aged 20: Parker was her mother's maiden name. She studied under Nicolas Kynaston, organist of Westminster Cathedral, whom she "acknowledged ... as the most important musical influence of her life", and Jean Langlais in Paris.

Parker-Smith performed at the Royal Albert Hall for the BBC Proms in 1972, but she gained considerable attention when she deputised at five days' notice for the indisposed Fernando Germani at the Royal Festival Hall, London in 1975. Although she made her reputation as an international soloist in concert halls, at festivals and through recordings, Parker-Smith was also a church organist at Deutsche Evangelische Christuskirche for 30 years.

== Personal life and death ==
At age 46, having never been married before, Jane married John Gadney (died 2012) in 1996, with no biological children of her own, Jane became stepmother to John's three children. She died during surgery on June 24, 2020, at age 70.

== Select discography ==
- Jane Parker-Smith at the Grand Organ of Armagh Cathedral. ASV Records.
- Louis James Alfred Lefébure-Wély. Romantische Orgelmusik. Jane Parker-Smith on the organ of St Nikolaus, Bergen-Enkheim, Frankfurt am Main. Motette-Verlag.
- Popular French Romantics Volume 1. Jane Parker-Smith on the organ of Coventry Cathedral. ASV Records.
- Popular French Romantics Volume 2. Jane Parker-Smith on the organ of Beauvais Cathedral. ASV Records.
- Saint-Saëns - Symphony No. 3 'The Organ'. London Philharmonic Orchestra. EMI Classics.
- Widor Organ Symphonies 5 & 7. Jane Parker-Smith on the organ of St Eustache, Paris. ASV Records.
- Janacek: Glagolitic Mass & Sinfonietta. City of Birmingham Symphony Orchestra (Dirigent: Simon Rattle). EMI Classics.
- Romantic and Virtuoso Works for Organ (Vol. 1). Jane Parker-Smith at the Goll organ of St Martin, Memmingen. Avie Records.
- Romantic and Virtuoso Works for Organ (Vol. 2). Jane Parker-Smith at the Great Seifert Organ of Marienbasilika, Kevelaer. Avie Records.
- Romantic and Virtuoso Works for Organ (Vol. 3). Jane Parker-Smith at the Organ of the Church of St. Gudula in Rhede. Avie Records.
