= John Warburton (producer) =

British television producer and director

John Warburton (also credited as John Hayward-Warburton) is a British television producer and director, best known for his collaborations with television producer, critic and prankster Victor Lewis-Smith.

== Early life ==
Warburton, who was born in 1964 and raised in Worcestershire, graduated in the mid-1980s from the Tonmeister music and sound recording course at the University of Surrey. During his time at the university, he became News and Features editor for University Radio Surrey (as it then was). He went on to produce/present for various local radio stations, specialising in music including playwright Jeremy Sandford's documentary, "Songs from the Roadside", on the history and practice of British gypsy music.

== Career ==
In 1997, he began working in television, collaborating on the series Ads Infinitum (1996-1998, for BBC Two) and the series TV Offal (1997-1998, for Channel 4), both written by Lewis-Smith with Paul Sparks.

He and Lewis-Smith produced a documentary about the now-defunct BBC Radiophonic Workshop, Alchemists of Sound, which was broadcast on BBC Four in October 2003. The documentary Artie Shaw - Quest for Perfection, written and presented by Russell Davies and produced by Warburton was shortlisted for a Grierson Award in 2004. Another joint production with Lewis-Smith, Here's a Piano I Prepared Earlier: Experimental Music in the 1960s achieved Grierson shortlisting in 2005. This film was shown at the Barbican, as part of the 70th birthday Music of Steve Reich film series. Lewis-Smith and he, now credited as co-producer, editor and Tonmeister, also collaborate on BBC Two's 21st Century Bach, which features historically informed performances of Johann Sebastian Bach's works by organist John Scott-Whiteley, using European organs with connections to Bach.

He worked on the series of seven occasional documentaries by actor Keith Allen made for Channel 4 Television, either as editor or producer, and is co-producer and editor of Allen's feature-film documentary Unlawful Killing, which has Lewis-Smith as writer and executive producer. This movie made its debut in the Marché du Film in Cannes in May 2011.
