= Stefan Engels =

German organist

Stefan Engels is a German organist.

Stefan Engels was appointed Professor of Organ and Leah Fullinwider Centennial Chair in Music Performance at Southern Methodist University in Dallas, Texas, in 2014, where he is also head of the Organ Department at the Meadows School of the Arts. This appointment was preceded by his positions as Professor of Organ at the University of Music and Performing Arts “Felix Mendelssohn Bartholdy” in Leipzig, Germany (2005-2015), and as Associate Professor of Organ at Westminster Choir College in Princeton, New Jersey (1999-2005).

While in Leipzig, Mr. Engels founded the European Organ Academy and served as its Artistic Director. Stefan Engels played a significant role in creating and organizing the Leipzig International Competition in Organ Improvisation.

As an advocate, champion and specialist in the music of the late-Romantic German Composer Sigfrid Karg-Elert, he founded the Karg-Elert Festival, demonstrating and discovering the unique organ, piano and chamber music works of this Leipzig composer.

He regularly serves on juries at the world’s leading organ competitions, such as the St. Albans International Organ Competition in the United Kingdom, The Canadian International Organ Competition in Montreal, The German Music Competition and the International Bach Competition in Leipzig.

Mr. Engels’ broad musical education took place in Germany and the United States. He studied organ, piano, harpsichord, choral conducting and sacred music at the universities in Aachen, Düsseldorf and Cologne. From 1993 until 1998 he pursued further organ studies with the late Robert T. Anderson at SMU in Dallas, TX, and with Wolfgang Rübsam at Northwestern University in Evanston, IL. Mr. Engels achieved his international breakthrough when he was awarded the “Concerto Gold Medal” at the 1998 Calgary International Organ Competition. Since then he was represented by Karen McFarlane Artists Inc. of Cleveland, Ohio. As of January 2024, he is no longer represented by Karen McFarlane Artists Inc.
