= Antoine Dessane =

French composer

Marie-Hyppolyte-Antoine Dessane (9 December 1826 – 8 June 1873), born in France and resident mostly in Quebec City in Canada from 1849, was an organist, conductor and composer.

== Life ==
Dessane was born in Forcalquier, son of Louis Dessane, a music teacher, and his wife Marie Maurel. The family moved to Billom in 1828, where Louis Dessane taught at a Jesuit college, and to Paris in 1837. Antoine Dessane, from age 10, studied piano, organ and cello at the Conservatoire de Paris; the director at that time was Luigi Cherubini, and fellow students were César Franck and Jacques Offenbach.

His father withdrew him from the Conservatoire in October 1841, and took Antoine and his eldest brother on a concert tour, which lasted a year and a half, touring French provinces, Italy, Austria and southern Germany. Dessane afterwards taught at the Jesuit college in Billom. In 1845 he moved to Clermont-Ferrand; he studied there with George Onslow and taught piano.

One of his pupils, Irma Trunel de la Croix-Nord, became his wife in 1847. They were to have nine children, of whom three boys and four girls survived infancy; at least three children became musicians.

=== Canada ===
Living conditions for musicians were difficult in France after the Revolution of 1848, and Dessane accepted an offer to succeed Theodore Frederic Molt as organist and choirmaster at Notre-Dame Basilica in Quebec City, Province of Canada. He arrived there with his wife and daughter in July 1849.

A concert in 1850 given by Dessane and his wife, a soprano or mezzo-soprano, was the beginning of his playing a leading part in musical circles in Quebec City. He gave musical soirées, later held in the Knights of Columbus Hall, seating about 1000. Operatic music, sung by Irma Dessane, was often performed.

The Septette Club, an ensemble of strings and wind, was formed by Dessane in 1857; it gave its first concert that year, continuing until 1871. In 1861 he formed an orchestra of about 60 players recruited from regimental bands, for which he composed two overtures.

In 1864 he resigned as organist of Notre-Dame; it is thought this was partly because of a disagreement with Ernest Gagnon about plainsong accompaniment, after the publication of P.-M. Lagacé's Chants d'Église.

=== New York, and return to Quebec City ===
Dessane was offered the post of organist of St Francis Xavier Church in New York, and in September 1865 the Dessanes moved to New York, where they stayed for four years. During this time his health declined. He appeared as conductor and pianist; in February 1866 he performed his Messe Solonnelle in D minor, with soloists including his wife, chorus and orchestra. He played cello in a series of string quartet concerts.

In 1869 the family returned to Quebec City, where Dessane had been offered the post of organist of Saint-Roch Church. He founded a choir, Société Sainte-Cécile, in December 1869. He planned to establish a conservatoire modelled on the Paris Conservatoire, offering various classes and with an orchestra. An inaugural concert was held in June 1871, but classes planned for the following autumn did not take place. Dessane's health deteriorated, and he had to reduce his activities. Dessane died at his home in Quebec City on 8 June 1873.

== Works ==
Compositions by Dessane, about 60 works of sacred and secular music, are held in the archives of Séminaire de Québec and Université Laval.

A manual on orchestration, written in 1869, was unpublished.
