= Theodore Frederic Molt =

Theodore Frederic Molt (originally Johann Friedrich Molt; 13 February 1795 – 16 November 1856) was a German-born music teacher, composer and organist in Canada. He published several works on teaching methods in music.

== Life ==
Molt was born in Gschwend, near Stuttgart, the son of a Lutheran organist. Soon after entering university he was conscripted into Napoleon's army, and served as assistant paymaster. On returning home he studied music; in 1822 he went to Canada, and lived in Quebec City, where he was a teacher of piano and music theory. In 1823 he married Henriette, daughter of Frédéric-Henri Glackemeyer, a musician in Quebec.

He travelled to Europe in June 1825, and met musicians including Ignaz Moscheles, Karl Czerny and Ludwig van Beethoven; it is thought that he did not receive lessons from them. Beethoven presented him with the canon "Freu' dich des Lebens". Molt returned to Canada in June 1826, and continued as a music teacher.

He published in 1828 Elementary Treatise on Music/Traité élémentaire de musique, the first bilingual Canadian treatise on music. In 1833 he moved to Burlington, Vermont, where he was a teacher at the Burlington Female Seminary, and composed music. He moved to Montreal in 1837; apparently unsuccessful there as a teacher, he returned to Quebec City by 1841.

In that year Molt was appointed organist at Québec Basilica, where he established a cathedral choir; in 1845 he published Traité élémentaire de musique vocale. In June 1846, his wife and two of his children died when the Théâtre Saint-Louis burned down. Two years later he married Harriett Cowan.

In 1849 Antoine Dessane replaced him as organist at Québec Basilica, and he moved to Burlington, resuming teaching at the Burlington Female Seminary. He published during this time A New and original method for the pianoforte, 51 progressive lessons, and The pupil’s guide and young teacher’s manual, or the elements of piano forte playing.

Molt died in Burlington in 1856.

== Compositions ==
He composed piano pieces and songs, some of which were published in Canada and America. He made many arrangements of sacred music. La lyre canadienne: répertoire des meilleures chansons et romances du jour, published anonymously in Quebec in 1847, is attributed to Molt.
