= Fernando Germani =

Italian musician (1906–1998)

Fernando Germani (5 April 1906 – 10 June 1998) was an Italian organist of the Basilica of St. Peter in Rome during the reign of Pope Pius XII.

== Early life ==
Germani was born in 1906 and played the piano and violin in public at four years of age. At the age of eight, he started taking lessons in composition from Respighi, who headed Germani toward the organ. Then at the age of 15, Germani was the organist of the Augusteo Symphony Orchestra in Rome. His career spanned almost 75 years. He died in 1998. One of his notable pupils was organist Gérard Caron. Others included the organist of Zagreb Cathedral, Hvalimira Bledšnajder; former organist of Westminster Cathedral, Nicolas Kynaston; former organist of Liverpool Cathedral, Noel Rawsthorne; and former organist of York Minster, John Scott Whiteley.

== Career ==
In 1951, Edizioni de Santis della ditta Alberto de Santis in Rome published Germani's edition of the toccatas of Girolamo Frescobaldi (1583–1644). His edition has increased in importance. He published one major organ work, the Toccata, which has now established a position in the repertory. An organ concerto was lost after Germani presented the manuscript to "an English gentleman" who never returned it.

During the 1960s, Germani visited Selby Abbey, North Yorkshire, England, and made three LP recordings: "He had the most formidable technique of his generation and will be forever remembered as the fount of enormous musical and technical inspiration."
