= Bruce Steane =

British organist and composer

Bruce Henry Dennis Steane (22 June 1866 – 1938) was a British organist and composer of classical music.

Steane was born in Camberwell, London. He began playing the piano at the age of 3 and was a chorister at the St. Augustine's Church at Forest Hill at the age of 8. At the age of 12 he became assistant organist there and later studied organ at Dulwich College.

In his later years Bruce Steane was organist for example at St Mary Matfelon, Cuddington Parish Church, Kemsing Parish Church (from 1903), Seal's Parish Church, Swanley Convalescent Home St Bartholomew's Hospital (from 1905) and Combe Martin Parish Church (from 1918).

He composed around 400 compositions, mainly organ and sacred music, among them 100 anthems, 25 church services and 120 organ compositions. Steane also composed some chamber and orchestral music, and won several prizes for his compositions

== Compositions ==
=== Organ ===
- Evensong for organ (1910)
- Imperial march, for organ
- Te Deum Laudamus in F, for organ
- A book of short Voluntaries, for organ
- Angelus for organ op.103
- Andante con moto, for organ
- Marche Triomphale

=== Anthems ===
- O give thanks unto the Lord
- I will not leave you comfortless
- Sing unto God
- Be merciful unto me, O God
- They that punt their trust in the Lord
- The Lord is my light and my salvation
- Rejoice, O je righteous
- Rise in joyfulness and splendour
- Bow down thine ear

=== Instrumental compositions ===
- Concert-Stück for violin op.285 (1913)
- Piano trio
- Romance for violin in D minor
- Symphony for orchestra Dreadnaught (performed 1911)
- Tone poem for orchestra Grimaldi
- Elegy for English horn and orchestra
- Tone poem for piano and orchestra (1914–15)
- La chute d'eau, for strings and wood wind
