= Gérard Caron (musician) =

Canadian musician (1916–1986)

Gérard Caron (2 April 1916 – 19 January 1986) was a Canadian organist and pianist.

Born in St-Martin-de-Beauce, Quebec, Caron studied at the Conservatoire national de musique, the Université de Montréal, the Accademia Musicale Chigiana in Sienna, Italy, and privately with Fernando Germani in Rome. He held organist posts at several notable cathedrals, including Notre-Dame-des-Victoires, Quebec City, Saint-Jean-Berchmans Church in Montreal, and in Manhattan, New York City, at the French church of St. Vincent de Paul, St. Patrick's Cathedral, and St. Jean Baptiste Catholic Church. He performed as a concert pianist and organist throughout North America, and in Florence, Turin, and Rome. Caron served as the regular accompanist for singers Pierrette Alarie and Léopold Simoneau.

Caron died at the age of 69 in Montreal.
