= Käte van Tricht =

German musician

Käte van Tricht (October 22, 1909 – July 13, 1996), was a German organist, pianist, harpsichordist, and pedagogue.

== Life ==
Käte van Tricht was born in Berlin. She was raised in Bremen, where her mother encouraged her not only to take piano lessons, but also to join the Domchor at Bremen Cathedral at age eight. Van Tricht held her first position as organist at age 19 at the Alte Waller Kirche in Bremen-Walle, and in 1930 obtained master's degrees in piano and organ performance at Bremen Conservatory (Staatliche Privatmusiklehrer-Prüfung).

Through the support of Richard Liesche, Music Director at Bremen Cathedral, Käte van Tricht was appointed Associate Organist at the Cathedral in 1933. From 1934 until 1937, she studied sacred music, piano performance (with Carl Adolf Martienssen) and organ performance (with Karl Straube), as well as counterpoint (with Johann Nepomuk David) at the Conservatory of Music in Leipzig. During this time, she also frequently performed as a soprano soloist at St. Thomas Church, Leipzig, under the direction of Karl Straube.

In addition to her activities as Cathedral Organist in Bremen over a period of 41 years, Käte van Tricht launched a highly successful international career as an organ recitalist in the 1950s and made numerous recordings, both on LP and CD, at Bremen Cathedral and other venues. Following her retirement as Cathedral Organist in 1974, van Tricht was appointed as lecturer of music at Bremen University. In 1996, Käte van Tricht was awarded the Federal Cross of Merit, First class (Bundesverdienstkreuz 1. Klasse). In July that year, she died at age 86 in Bremen.

Among her former students is the German organist Martin Welzel.

== Discography ==
- Das Orgelportrait: Das Silbermann-Positiv in der Krypta des Bremer Doms. Works by Johann Pachelbel and Franz Xaver Murschhauser. 1 Single. Nienburg/Weser: Psallite, n.d.
- Das Orgelportrait: Die Konrad-Euler-Orgel der Benediktinerinnenabtei Heilig Kreuz, Herstelle an der Weser. Works by Johann Sebastian Bach, Vincent Lübeck and Georg Böhm. 1 LP. Nienburg/Weser: Psallite, 1967.
- Das Orgelportrait: Die Sauer-Orgel des St. Petri Doms zu Bremen. Works by Alexandre Guilmant and Louis Vierne. 1 LP. Nienburg/Weser: Psallite, 1968.
- Das Orgelportrait. Die Breil-Orgel in der St. Urbanuskirche in Gelsenkirchen-Buer. Works by Johann Sebastian Bach, Johann Ludwig Krebs, Jenö Kapi-Kralik, Ludwig Lenel, Walter Piston and Leo Sowerby. 1 LP. Nienburg/Weser: Psallite, n.d.
- Abendmusik in St. Severin zu Keitum/Sylt. Organ works by Jean Baptiste Loeillet, Henry Purcell and Ernst Pepping. 1 LP. Buchholz: Musica Viva, 1979.
- Music for Harpsichord and Organ. Works by George Frideric Handel, Nicholas Carleton, Thomas Tomkins, Carl Philipp Emanuel Bach, François Couperin and Bernardo Pasquini. Performers: Käte van Tricht and Wolfgang Baumgratz. 1 LP. Köln: EMI-Electrola, 1980.
- Käte van Tricht spielt an vier Orgeln im Bremer Dom. Works by Johann Kaspar Kerll, Johann Pachelbel, Johann Sebastian Bach, Max Reger, Paul de Maleingreau, Louis J. A. Lefébure-Wély, Johann C. H. Rinck and Charles Ives. 2 LPs. Detmold: Musikproduktion Dabringhaus & Grimm, 1983.
- Johann Sebastian Bach: Organ Works, played from the Karl Straube Edition (Sauer organ, Bremen Cathedral). 1 CD. Detmold : Musikproduktion Dabringhaus & Grimm, 1987.
- Works by Franz Liszt and Max Reger (Sauer organ, Bremen Cathedral, Germany). 1 CD. Detmold: Musikproduktion Dabringhaus & Grimm, 1989.
- Johann Sebastian Bach: Goldberg Variations BWV 988 (Van Vulpen organ, Bremen Cathedral). 1 CD. Detmold: Musikproduktion Dabringhaus & Grimm, 1992.
- Homage to Käte van Tricht (Organs at Bremen Cathedral, Germany). Works by Johann Pachelbel, Johann Kaspar Kerll, Johann Sebastian Bach, Max Reger, Paul de Maleingreau, Léon Boëllmann, Louis J. A. Lefébure-Wély, Johann C. H. Rinck, Charles Ives and Franz Liszt. 2 CDs. Detmold: Musikproduktion Dabringhaus & Grimm, 1999.

== Bibliography ==
- Van Tricht, Käte. Ischa Freimaak. Bremer Foxtrott für den kommenden Winter. Bremen, Germany: Aschoff, 1928.
- Van Tricht, Käte. Ein Leben auf der Walze. Lebenserinnerungen (unpublished memoirs). Bremen, Germany, n.d.
- Allers, Hans-Adolf. "Käte van Tricht", in: Lebensgeschichten: Schicksale Bremer Christen jüdischer Abstammung nach 1933, edited by the Vereinigung für Bremische Kirchengeschichte. Hospitum Ecclesiae (Forschungen zur Bremischen Kirchengeschichte), Vol. 23, 2006. Second Edition, 2009. Bremen, Germany: Hauschild.
- Winklhofer, Friedemann. "Nur einmal richtig glücklich sein. Käte van Tricht (1909–1996): Erste deutsche Konzertorganistin und 40 Jahre Domorganistin in Bremen," in Organ: Journal für die Orgel no. 2 (1999): 22–28.
