= Charlotte von Schéele =

Swedish organist (1840–1929)

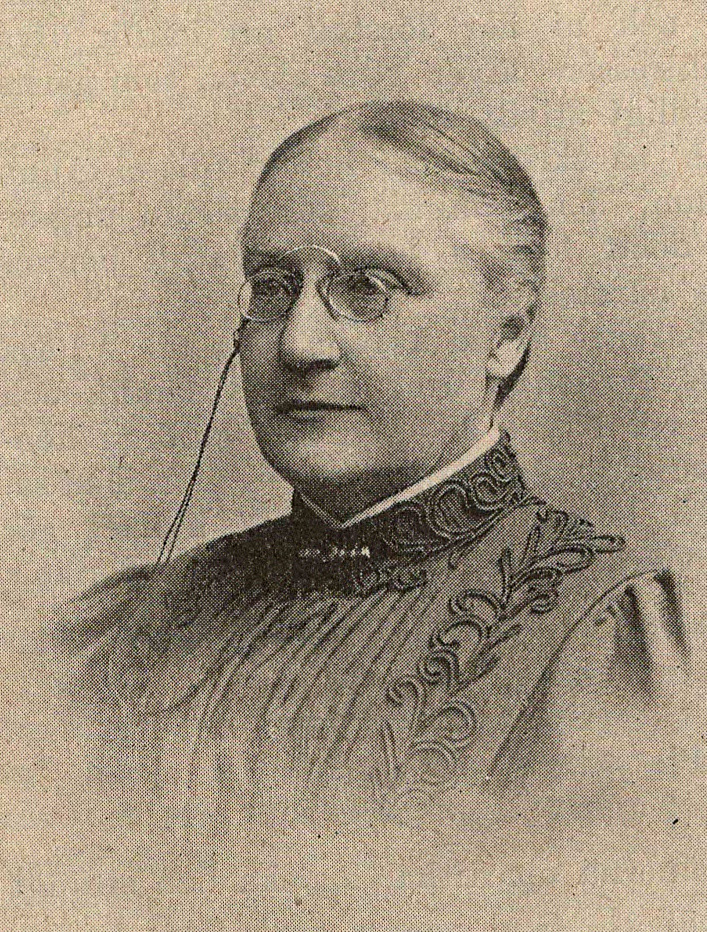
- Born: 17 August 1840
- Died: 14 April 1929 (aged 88); Gothenburg
- Occupations: Organist, singing teacher, artist

Johanna Sofia Charlotta (Charlotte) von Schéele (17 August 1840 – 14 April 1929) was a Swedish organist, singing teacher and artist.

Charlotte von Schéele was born in 1840 in Filipstad.

She was the daughter of the superintendent Frans Adolf von Schéele and Maria Elisabeth Lundqvist and the sister of the artist Augusta Ekman as well as the niece of the artist Carl von Schéele.

Von Schéele trained at Royal Swedish Academy of Music, and having finished her education, she worked as an organist in Filipstad from 1866; she was the first woman hired as an organist in the Church of Sweden. She subsequently worked as an organist at Hedvigs kyrka in Norrköping, from 1871 to 1873, when she got a position as teacher of music and singing at the Kjellbergska flickskolan in Gothenburg, where she worked until 1898, when she retired.

As an artist, she reproduced over 800 of Sweden's wild flowers and around 150 of the Garden Society's exotic plants, where 83 plant images were published in the three booklets Till folkskolornas och skollovskoloniernas tjänst 1906–1907 in life-size with text by herself.

She also published a songbook for girls' high schools.
