= George C. Baker =

American musician and dermatologist (born 1951)

- Born: June 9, 1951 (age 75); Dallas, Texas, United States
- Education: University of Texas; Southwestern Medical School; Cox School of Business
- Alma mater: Southern Methodist University
- Occupations: Organist; composer; pedagogue; dermatologist

George C. Baker (born June 9, 1951, in Dallas, Texas) is an American organist, composer, pedagogue, and dermatologist.

== Biography ==
Baker received his first musical instruction at age four. In 1961, he began to take organ lessons with Philip Eldridge Baker, organist at Highland Park Methodist Church in Dallas. He completed his organ studies with Robert T. Anderson at Southern Methodist University in Dallas in 1973 with a Bachelor's degree in Music. In 1969, he won the Regional Competition, and, in 1970, the National Organ Competition of the American Guild of Organists in Buffalo, NY.

Additional organ studies in France followed with Marie-Claire Alain, André Marchal, Pierre Cochereau, and Jean Langlais. In 1974, Baker won the Grand Prix de Chartres in organ performance. A year later, he obtained a Diplôme de Virtuosité from the Schola Cantorum in Paris, and, in 1977, a Master of Music from the University of Florida. He graduated with a Doctor of Musical Arts from the University of Michigan in 1979 and joined the faculty of the Catholic University in Washington, D.C. The same year, he won a first prize at the International Organ Improvisation Competition in Lyon. His recordings include the complete organ works of Johann Sebastian Bach and Louis Vierne (along with Pierre Cochereau), as well as the world premiere recording of the organ compositions of Darius Milhaud, which was awarded two Grand Prix du Disque.

In addition to his musical career, Baker obtained an MD from University of Texas Southwestern Medical School in Dallas in 1987 and began to practice medicine in 1991, after an internship in Internal medicine and Dermatology until his retirement in 2021. In 1996, he entered the Executive MBA program at Cox School of Business, Southern Methodist University, in Dallas, where he graduated with an Master of Business Administration in 1998.

Baker was lecturer in Organ Improvisation at Rice University, Houston until his retirement in 2021. In November 2021, he was appointed as adjunct associate professor of Organ at SMU Meadows School of the Arts.

== Compositions ==
=== Organ Solo ===
- The Wild Ouest Toccata (composed in 1969/revised in 2025. Dallas, TX: Baroque Notes, Inc., 2025)
- Berceuse-Paraphrase (composed in 1992. Chicago, IL: H. T. Fitzsimmons Company, 1993)
- Divertissement (Chicago, IL: H. T. Fitzsimmons Company, 1996)
- At the River (Tarzana, CA: Fred Bock, 2000)
- Tuba Tune Ragtime (composed in 2003. Tarzana, CA: Gentry Publications, 2004)
- Ricercare on "Nun komm, der Heiden Heiland" (composed in 2004. Dallas, TX: Baroque Notes, Inc., 2020)
- Toccata-Gigue on the Sussex Carol (composed in 2008/revised in 2019. Dallas, TX: Baroque Notes, Inc.)
- Variations on "Rouen" (composed in 2010. Dallas, TX: Baroque Notes, Inc., 2011)
- Tiento Grégorien (composed in 2010. Dallas, TX: Baroque Notes, Inc., 2011)
- Lamento (composed in 2013. Dallas, TX: Baroque Notes, Inc., 2013)
- Prelude on "The Lone, Wild Bird" (composed in 2015. Dallas, TX: Baroque Notes, Inc., 2017)
- Procession Royale (composed in 2016. Dallas, TX: Baroque Notes, Inc., 2017)
- Danse Diabolique (composed in 2016. Dallas, TX: Baroque Notes, Inc., 2017)
- Deux Evocations (composed in 2017. Dallas, TX: Baroque Notes, Inc., 2017):
  - Evocation 1: June 2, 1937 (Ad Memoriam Louis Vierne)
  - Evocation 2: April 22, 1984 (Ad Memoriam Pierre Cochereau)
- Prelude on "If Thou But Suffer God to Guide Thee" (Dallas, TX: Baroque Notes, Inc., 2018)
- L'Envoi (Dallas, TX: Baroque Notes, Inc., 2018)
- Prière Grégorienne (composed in 2018. Dallas, TX: Baroque Notes, Inc., 2018)
- Berceuse sur le nom de SWANN (composed in 2019. Dallas, TX: Baroque Notes, Inc., 2019)
- Prelude on Salve Regina (composed in 2020. Dallas, TX: Baroque Notes, Inc., 2020)
- Deux Miniatures (composed in 2020. Dallas: Baroque Notes, Inc., 2020)
  1. Ave Maris Stella
  2. Salve Regina
- Recessional on "Hyfrydol" (composed in 2021. Dallas, TX: Baroque Notes, Inc., 2022)
- Diptyque: Mors et Resurrectio (composed in 2022. Dallas, TX: Baroque Notes, Inc., 2022)
- Le Tombeau de Jean Langlais (composed in 2021. Dallas, TX: Baroque Notes, Inc., 2022)
- Tuba Tune Royale (composed in 2022. Dallas, TX: Baroque Notes, Inc., 2022)
- Paraphrase sur le TE DEUM (composed in 2022. Dallas, TX: Baroque Notes, Inc., 2022)
- Petit Choral – Dorian mode (composed in 2022. Dallas, TX: Baroque Notes, Inc., 2022)
- Pièce Modale 1 – Dorian mode (composed in 2022. Dallas, TX: Baroque Notes, Inc., 2022)
- Pièce Modale 2 – Phrygian mode (composed in 2022. Dallas, TX: Baroque Notes, Inc., 2022)
- Pièce Modale 3 sur "Ave Maris Stella" – Lydian mode (composed in 2022. Dallas, TX: Baroque Notes, Inc., 2022)
- Pièce Modale 4 – Mixolydian mode (composed in 2022. Dallas, TX: Baroque Notes, Inc., 2022)
- Chorale and Variations on "Vom Himmel hoch, da komm' ich her" (composed in 2022. Dallas, TX: Baroque Notes, Inc., 2022)
- French Classical Suite (composed in 2022. Dallas, TX: Baroque Notes, Inc., 2022)
  - Grand Plein Jeu
  - Petite Fugue sur la Trompette
  - Duo
  - Basse et Dessus de Trompette
  - Flûtes
  - Récit de Nazard
  - Dialogue dur les Grands Jeux
- A Texas Pastorale (composed in 2022. Dallas, TX: Baroque Notes, Inc., 2022)
- Meditation on "Ave Maris Stella" (composed in 2022. Dallas, TX: Baroque Notes, Inc., 2022)
- A Short Lamento (composed in 2022. Dallas, TX: Baroque Notes, Inc., 2022)
- Prélude on "St. Anne" (composed in 2022. Dallas, TX: Baroque Notes, Inc., 2022)
- Prelude on the Sanctus of Mass VIII (composed in 2023. Dallas, TX: Baroque Notes, Inc., 2023)
- Chant d'Espoir (composed in 2023. Dallas, TX: Baroque Notes, Inc., 2023)
- Etoile dans le noir (composed in 2025. Dallas, TX: Baroque Notes, Inc., 2025)
- Variations on "Picardy" (composed in 2025. Dallas, TX: Baroque Notes, Inc., 2025)

=== Organ and other instruments ===
- Rumba for organ and four percussionists (composed in 2015. Dallas, TX: Baroque Notes, Inc., 2017)
- Joie for organ, timpani and brass quintet (composed in 2020. Dallas, TX: Baroque Notes, Inc., 2021)
- Ein feste Burg for organ duet (transcribed in 2012. Dallas, TX: Baroque Notes, Inc., 2025)

=== Choral ===
- Noels for SATB voices, accompanied (Tarzana: CA: Gentry Publications, 2000)
- Nun komm, der Heiden Heiland for choir and organ (composed in 2004. Manuscript)
- Our Father for SATB choir (composed in 2005. Manuscript)

=== Transcriptions ===
- Johann Sebastian Bach: "Jesu, Joy of Man's Desiring", arranged for organ solo (Dallas, TX: Baroque Notes, Inc., 2025)

== Discography ==
- Johann Sebastian Bach: Complete Organ Works. Recorded between 1976 and 1979 in Thionville, at Notre-Dame-des-Blancs-Mateaux and Saint- Louis in Paris, France. Sigean, France: Solstice Music.
- Johann Sebastian Bach: 5 Organ Concertos. Concertos BWV 592–596. Recorded on the Kern organ at Notre-Dame-des-Blancs-Mateaux in Paris, France. Sigean, France: Solstice Music FYCD 080. 1 CD.
- Pierre du Mage: Livre d'Orgue & Louis-Nicolas Clérambault: 2 Suites. Recorded in 1976 at Houdan, France. Sigean, France: Solstice Music, 1976. 1 LP.
- Marcel Dupré: Organ Works Vol. 13. Vision op. 44, Zephyrs, Deuxième Symphonie op. 26, Six Antiennes pour le Temps de Noël op. 48, Chorales op. 28 (Nos. 21–23, 36-41 & 66). Recorded in 2001 at Perkins Chapel, SMU, Dallas, Texas. Naxos 8.554542. 1 CD.
- Paul Hindemith: 3 Sonatas & Max Reger: Organ Works. Recorded in 1975 at Saint-Sernin, Toulouse, France. Sigean, France: Solstice Music, 1975. 1 LP.
- Darius Milhaud: Complete Organ Works. Recorded in 1974 at Chartres Cathedral, France. Sigean, France: Solstice Music FYCD 916. 1 CD.
- Louis Vierne: 24 Pièces de Fantaisie. Recorded in 1993 at Saint-Ouen, Rouen, France. Sigean, France: Solstice Music FYCD 817/8. 2 CDs.
- Louis Vierne: 24 Pièces en style libre op. 31, Messe basse op. 30, Messe basse pour les défunts op. 62, Prélude funèbre op. 4. Recorded in 1990 and 1993 at Saint-Ouen, Rouen, France. Sigean, France: Solstice Music FYCD 815/6. 2 CDs.
- Louis Vierne: Organ Works. Messe solennelle op. 16, Verset fugué sur "In exitu Israel" (1894), Allegretto op. 1, Communion op. 8, Triptyque op. 58, Prélude (1914), 3 Improvisations, Marche triomphale op. 46. Recorded in 1993 at St. Ouen, Rouen, France. Sigean, France: Solstice Music FYCD 815/6. 2 CDs.
- Organ Works of American Composers. Recorded in 1976 at Saint-Sernin, Toulouse, France. Sigean, France: Solstice Music, 1976. 1 LP.
- Charles-Marie Widor: Symphonie Gothique & Louis Vierne: 24 Pièces en style libre op. 31. Recorded in 1990 at Saint-Ouen, Rouen, France. Sigean, France: Solstice Music.
- Riches to Rags: Works of Bach and Joplin. Baroque Notes Inc., 1997. 1 CD.
- Jean Langlais: un centenaire/a centenary. Recorded 2007 at Saint-Sernin, Toulouse, France. Sigean: Solstice Music, 2007. 1 CD.
- Olivier Messiaen: La Nativité du Seigneur. Baroque Notes Inc., 2008. 1 CD.
- Hommage à Cochereau. (Along with David Briggs, Thierry Escaich und Loïc Mallié.) Recorded in 2008 at Saint-Sulpice, Paris, France (George Baker: Ricercar on "Nun komm, der Heiden Heiland", Berceuse-Paraphrase, Toccata-Gigue on the Sussex Carol). Sigean: Solstice Music, 2009. 1 CD.

== Bibliography ==
- Baker, George. "An Interview with Maurice Duruflé." The American Organist 14(11), November 1980.
- Baker, George. "Improvisation Masterclass – Philippe Lefebvre." DVD video recording at Perkins Chapel, SMU Dallas. Dallas, TX: Baroque Notes, Inc., 2011.
- Baker, George. Organ Improvisation: A Workbook of Ideas and Exercises Leading to New Musical Creations (ePublication). Dallas, TX: Baroque Notes, Inc., 2022.
- Baker, George. Exercises for Organ Improvisations: Lydian Mode Modulations (ePublication). Dallas, TX: Baroque Notes, Inc., 2023.
- Blanc, Frédéric (ed.) "An interview with Maurice Duruflé by George Baker." In Maurice Duruflé: Souvenirs et autres écrits. Paris, France: Séguier, 2005, 203–228.
- Pâris, Alain (ed.). "George Baker". In Dictionnaire des interprètes et de l'interprétation musicale au XXe siècle. Paris, France: Laffont, 1985, 178.
- Pâris, Alain (ed.). "George Baker". In Lexikon der Interpreten klassischer Musik im 20. Jahrhundert. Kassel, Germany: Bärenreiter, 1992, 38–39.
- Warnier, Vincent. "George C. Baker (né en 1951)." In Renaud Machart and Vincent Warnier (eds.): Les grands organistes du XXe siècle. Paris, France: Buchet-Chastel, 2018, 303–309.
