= Sebastian Heindl =

German organist (born 1997)

Sebastian Heindl (born 1997 in Gera, Germany) is a German organist.

== Education ==
Heindl began studying piano at age five and then at age ten became a singer in the Thomanerchor of the St. Thomas Church in Leipzig, where he began studying the organ under the university organist, Daniel Beilschmidt. He is currently studying organ under Martin Schmeding and Thomas Lennartz at the University of Music and Theatre Leipzig.

== Career ==
Heindl has made recordings for MDR Fernsehen and Bayerischer Rundfunk public broadcasters and was featured in a BBC documentary with John Eliot Gardiner.

In 2017 he performed the Concerto pour orgue, cordes et timbales of Francis Poulenc with the Jungen Mitteldeutschen Kammerorchester in the Gewandhaus in Leipzig.

== Selected awards ==
- 2012 and 2015 – Jugend musiziert
- 2016 – Internationaler Bach Wettbewerb Leipzig: Special Prize for the youngest participant
- 2017 – Organ – Journal für die Orgel: Organist of the Year 2016
- 2017 – Northern Ireland International Organ Competition 2017, First Prize
- 2018 – Internationale Orgelwoche Nürnberg: Organ Competition, Third Prize
- 2019 – Longwood Gardens International Organ Competition: Pierre S. du Pont First Prize, Audience Choice Prize, American Guild of Organists Philadelphia Chapter Prize

== Selected discography ==
- Flaschenpost-Geheimnisse: Dukas und seine Schüler, Alain, Messiaen und Duruflé. Rondeau Production Leipzig 2016.
- Sebastian Heindl: St. Matthias Berlin Concert (Dupré, Bach, Beethoven, Liszt, Franck, Duruflé, Middleschulte). Spotify 2021.
