= Andrew E. Unsworth =

American organist

Andrew Emerson Unsworth (born 1970) is an American organist who has served as an organist for the Salt Lake Tabernacle since 2007, which includes being an organist for the Tabernacle Choir at Temple Square, which is the principal resident musical organization there.

Unsworth holds a bachelor's degree in organ performance and pedagogy from Brigham Young University, as well as master's and doctoral degrees from Duke University. From 2001 to 2006 he was the organist for the Cathedral of the Madeleine in Salt Lake City. Prior to becoming a Tabernacle organist, Unsworth was an assistant professor of music history and organ at Stephen F. Austin State University.

He married Alison Giauque and they are the parents of five children. He is a member of the Church of Jesus Christ of Latter-day Saints, and was a missionary in the church's England London Mission.

== Awards ==
- Associateship Prize (2010), American Guild of Organists

== Works ==
- Unsworth, Andrew E. (2001). "Organ Pedagogy in Boston 1850-1900". The Tracker. 45 (3–4). Organ Historical Society, Westminster Choir College: 6–21.
- —— (September 29, 2001). Women as Professional Musicians: 'Lady Organists' in Nineteenth-Century America (Speech). Fall Meeting. East Carolina University: American Musicological Society, Southeast Chapter.
- —— (March 2002). "George E. Whiting, 19th-century Boston Organist". Newsletter of the American Musical Instrument Society: 76.
- —— (May 26, 2008). Opening Address (PDF) (Speech). Super Saturday. Madsen Recital Hall, Brigham Young University: Utah Valley Chapter of the American Guild of Organists.

== See also ==
- List of Mormon Tabernacle Choir organists
- Salt Lake Tabernacle organ
