= John Scott Whiteley =

English organist and composer (born 1950)

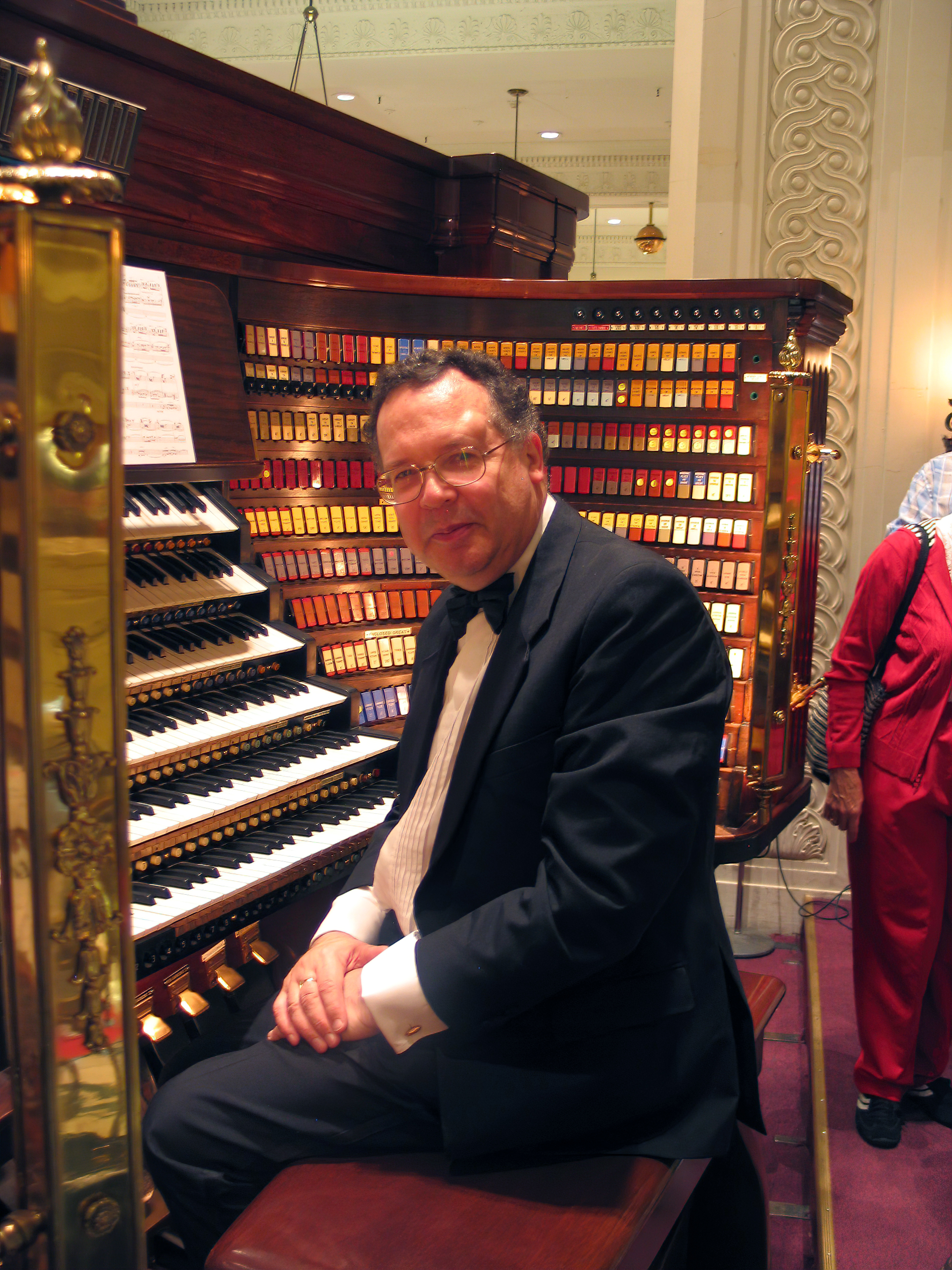
- Whiteley in 2008

Background information
- Born: 1950 (age 75–76)
- Genres: Organ, Classical
- Occupations: Organist, Composer
- Instrument: Pipe organ
- Years active: 1976–present

John Scott Whiteley (born 1950) is an English organist and composer. He has performed extensively around the world and since 1985 has undertaken an annual tour of the US. He has performed in most major UK cathedrals and concert halls, and was Assistant Organist and later Organist and Director of the Girls' Choir at York Minster between 1976 and 2010. He is currently Organist Emeritus of York Minster.

== Career ==
John Scott Whiteley was born in Leicester in 1950. He was educated at Wyggeston Grammar School for Boys in that city (where he played the school’s organ), and then at London University and at the Royal College of Music, after which he was awarded scholarships to study with Fernando Germani in Siena and Flor Peeters in Malines. He was sub-organist at St Edmundsbury Cathedral from 1973 to 1975. In 1976 he won first prize in the National Organ Competition of Great Britain, for his playing of J. S. Bach's Clavierübung. Also in 1976 he moved to York Minster where became Assistant Organist and Director of the Girls’ Choir. He has researched and written a book about Belgian composer Joseph Jongen, which has been described by Organists' Review as "a benchmark publication of impressive scholarship." His numerous recordings include Great Romantic Organ Music, The Dupré Legacy and The complete organ works of Joseph Jongen (Priory Records).

Whiteley combines his busy schedule with recording and touring and has composed anthems and organ works, some of which are published by Banks Music Publications. He has also transcribed the Symphonie en improvisation, recorded by Pierre Cochereau at Notre-Dame de Paris for Philips in December 1963 (published by Butz Verlag). Whiteley was a part-time teacher of organ at Hull University from 1978 to 2003, and he has often been an adjudicator at the Royal Northern College of Music and elsewhere. For ten years he was a member of the Council of the Royal College of Organists.

In 2003 he began recording the complete organ works of Johann Sebastian Bach on historical organs (many associated with Bach) for BBC television and Associated-Rediffusion television productions. The project is called 21st century Bach, and began showing in sections on BBC Two and BBC Four. Three DVD volumes (about half of the total) have been released, and series 4 is now awaiting production. Organs used include the restored Zacharias Hildebrandt instrument of St Wenzel's church in Naumburg, and St Boniface's Church (the "Bachkirche") in Arnstadt. The series employs unusual filming techniques, including the use of miniature cameras and mirrors inside the organs' mechanisms, and a floating camera filming from unusual viewpoints. The organist is shown quietly walking to the instrument in the empty church, and quietly walking out again when he has finished. The titles were designed by Damien Hirst and the recording engineer is John Warburton.

In September 2010, he left his post at York Minster in order to pursue his freelance career. Since then he has had his own small concert hall built, in which a 31-stop pipe organ of revolutionary design has been installed. He continues to write and to give recitals and lectures on Bach performance and on other aspects of the organ and its music. Further details can be found at his website.

== Compositions ==
=== Choir ===
- Christmas Anthem – Jesu Redemptor Omnium (SATB, S solo, org) Op.2 (1982)
- Evening Canticles (York Service) (SSAATTBB, soloists, org) Op.3(1983)
- Five Cathedral Motets: No.1 Laudate Deum Omnes Angeli (S & B soli, SSATTB) Op.5 No. 1 (1990)
- Four Psalm Chants (SATB), 2 in York Minster Psalter (1993)
- Five Cathedral Motets: No.3 Reges Tharsis (SSAATTBB unacc.) Op.5 No. 3 (2001)
- Evening Canticles (Second Service) (SATB unacc.) Op.10 (2001)
- Five Cathedral Motets: No.4 Te lucis ante terminum (SSAATTBBB, SSS soli, unacc.) Op.5 No. 4 (2001)
- Five Cathedral Motets: No.5 Lucis creator optime (SSAATTBB, S solo) Op.5 No. 5 (2002)
- Anthem: At the round earth’s imagin’d corners (SSAATTBB, S solo, org) Op.12 (2005)

=== Organ ===
- Variations on a Theme of Berlioz (org) Op.1 (1973/84)
- Fantasia espansiva (org) For Francis Jackson's 80th Birthday Op.6 (1997)
- Toccata di dissonanze on themes of Frescobaldi and Chicago (org) Op.7 (1998)
- Trilogy on Stanzas of Shakespeare's Sonnets (org) Op.11 (2002)
- Scherzo': In Memoriam Maurice Duruflé (org) Op.11a (2005)
- Scherzetto and fugue on the name Francis Jackson (org) Op.15 (2007)
- Passacaglia (org) Op.17 (2008–09)
- Five Sisters windows: glass-effect pieces for organ Op.18 (2010)
