= Luc Ponet =

Luc Ponet is a Belgian organist, academic and board member of Nationaal Instituut voor de Orgelkunst.

Ponet was educated at College of Music, Lemmens Institute, Leuven. He won the Prix d’excellence, (1982-1985) then attended Hochschule für Musik und darstellende Kunst – Wien and holds a master's degree. Ponet specialised in organ performance and improvisation in Toulouse (M.-C. Alain, X. Darasse, M. Chapuis, M. Radulescu)(1981), in Mechelen (Flor Peeters) (1983), in Haarlem, International Summeracademy for Organists (Hans Haselböck, Ton Koopman, Harald Vogel) (1986) and again in Haarlem at the International Summeracademy for Organists (Montserrat Torrent, Ewald Kooiman, Bernard Winsemius) (1992). Ponet performed in major festivals all over the world.

Ponet has held key positions including titular-organist, Basilica Tongeren (since 1988), organist-in-residence and Music Director, Landcommanderij Alden Biesen (since 1999) and city organist - curator of the organ festival in Leuven (since 2012). He is Inspector for Art education (academies of music/conservatories) for the Flemish Government Belgium since 2000.

Ponet's teaching positions include: Professor for organ, LUCA School of Arts (the former Lemmens Institute) – Leuven (since 1982) and Visiting professor, Concordia University - River Forest/Chicago (USA)(1996) and Baylor University – Waco/Texas (USA) (2006). Masterclasses in Belgium, Holland, Italy, Mexico, USA, ... . Other positions have included Artistic Director - Organ Concert Series Orgelforum Haspengouw (since 2003), board member - Nederlands Instituut voor Orgelkunst (since 2007) and board member - International Organ Festival Haarlem (since 2011).

Over the years he has recorded several CDs and has published a number of books and articles in specialist journals about organs and the organist’s art. At the Faculty of Architecture and the Arts of the University Leuven, drs. Luc Ponet prepares a doctoral degree with a dissertation on performance practice and the organist’s art in the prince bishopric of Liège during the first half of the 17th century.

== Recordings ==
- Charles Tournemire, Symphonie N° 7 opus 49 “Les Danses de la Vie” – worldpremière (1992) (Orchestre Philharmonique de Liège, conductor: Pierre Bartholomée, organist: Luc Ponet)
- Charles Tournemire, Symphonie N° 6 opus 48 pour Ténor, Choeur, Orgue et Orchestre – worldpremière (1995) (Orchestre Philharmonique de Liège, conductor: Pierre Bartholomée, organist: Luc Ponet)
- Luc Ponet plays the organs of the Lemmensinstituut in Leuven (RGIP CD 87 108)
- Bach and contemporaries, Luc Ponet plays the Thomas-organ of the Abbey Church in Leffe (Pavane ADW 7413)
- Livre d'orgue Anonyme du XVIIIième siècle, Luc Ponet plays the Van Peteghem-organ of the Landcommandry Alden Biesen (Pavane ADW 7439)
- The Flemish Organ Heritage Volume I, Luc Ponet plays the 17th century Ancion-organ of the Begijnhof in St. Truiden (NAXOS 8.555279)
- Flemish Organ Treasure Volume I, Luc Ponet plays the J.B. Le Picard-/Thomas-organ (1753/2002) of the Basilica in Tongeren (VISION-AIR 5 411799 200413)
- Gabriël Fauré, Requiem and other compositions for choir, orchestra and organ (2005) - Nederlands Kamerkoor, LSO-Maastricht, organist: Luc Ponet, conductor: Ed Spanjaard
- Johann Sebastian Bach, Die Goldbergvariationen (2007), Luc Ponet plays the Van Peteghem-organ of Alden Biesen (Etoile Productions)
