= Canadian International Organ Competition =

The Canadian International Organ Competition (CIOC) (French: Concours international d'orgue du Canada) is an organisation devoted to the promotion of organ music. It works in collaboration with various organisations of the organ world to fulfill its mission. In Montreal every three years, the CIOC presents an international competition open to organists of all nationalities under 35 years of age. Sixteen organ virtuosi perform for a jury of nine internationally renowned specialists and compete for major awards. In addition to the prize money ($30,000 for the winner, $70,000 total) the top prizewinner receives a three-year representation agreement for USA and Canada, a CD recording, recitals and career coaching.

The CIOC first edition took place from October 8–19, 2008, the second edition from October 5–16, 2011 in Montreal, the third from October 7–19, 2014 and the fourth edition from October 6–21, 2017.

== History ==
Since 1997, the McGill Summer Organ Academy has welcomed some of the world's foremost organists to teach and perform. The closure of the Calgary International Organ Competition in 2002 offered an opportunity for Montreal fill the void with its own competition. By 2006, a group of music lovers had gathered around John Grew, McGill University Organist, to create the CIOC.

== Juries ==
Prior to the beginning of each competition, the CIOC Board of Directors approves the jury selected by CIOC's Artistic Director John Grew. These jurors hold sole responsibility for choosing which competitors will receive the CIOC awards. Jurors are chosen from a wide range of international artists, based on their work and excellent reputations. The competition jury of nine is presided over by John Grew.

== 2008 edition ==
From 58 applicants from 17 countries, 16 competitors representing 11 countries were selected by a Preliminary Jury. Over 7,000 people attended the CIOC 40-event programme. There was no charge for entry to the rounds of competition.

The inaugural Canadian International Organ Competition was won by Frédéric Champion from France. Frédéric Champion acted as the organisation's ambassador during concert tours he has given in North America, Europe and Asia till the next winner was declared in 2011.

=== 2008 Laureates ===
- First: Frédéric Champion, France
- Second: Andrew Dewar, United Kingdom
- Third: Jens Korndörfer – Germany

=== 2008 Special prizes ===
- Richard Bradshaw Audience Prize: Frédéric Champion, France
- Bach Prize: Els Biesemans, Belgium
- Messiaen Prize: Andrew Dewar, United Kingdom
- Royal Canadian College of Organists Prize: Jonathan Oldengarm, Canada

== 2011 edition ==
Out of 60 applicants from 17 countries, 16 contestants were invited to compete in Montreal.

=== 2011 Laureates ===
- First: Christian Lane, USA
- Second: Jens Korndörfer, Germany
- Third: ex-aequo, Jean-Willy, France, Balthasar Baumgartner, Germany

=== 2011 Special prizes ===
- Richard Bradshaw Audience Prize: Jean-Willy Kunz, France
- Bach Prize: Yulia Yufereva, Russia
- Jehan Alain Prize: Andreas Jud, Switzerland
- Liszt Prize : Jens Korndörfer, Germany
- Royal Canadian College of Organists Prize: Jared Ostermann, USA

== 2014 edition ==
From 42 applicants, including 25 men and 17 women, 16 were invited to Montreal. The 2014 Competition took place in Montreal from October 7–19, 2014 in churches such as Saint-Jean-Baptiste and Notre-Dame Basilica; the CIOC winners played on the Grand Orgue Pierre-Béique organ of the Orchestre symphonique de Montréal in the Maison Symphonique. In total almost 10 000 came to CIOC events, including 40 concerts, competition rounds and events.

=== 2014 Laureates ===
- First: David Baskeyfield, United-Kingdom
- Second: Andrew Dewar, United-Kingdom
- Third: Daria Burlak, Russia

=== 2014 Special prizes ===
- Richard Bradshaw Audience Prize: David Baskeyfield, United-Kingdom
- Bach Prize: Andrew Dewar, United-Kingdom
- Royal Canadian College of Organists Prize: David Baskeyfield, United-Kingdom

== 2017 edition ==
20 young talents were invited to play in Montreal at the 2017 edition. The 2017 Competition took place in Montreal from October 6–21, 2017 in at Church of the Immaculate Conception, Church of St-Jean-Baptiste and Notre-Dame Basilica.

=== 2017 Laureates ===
- First: Alcée Chris, United States
- Second: Oliver Brett, United Kingdom
- Third: Nicholas Capozzoli, United States

=== 2017 Special prizes ===
- Bach Prize: Alcée Chris, United States
