= Hans-André Stamm =

German organist and freelance composer

- Born: Leverkusen, West Germany
- Genres: Classical
- Occupation: Organist
- Instrument: organ

Hans-André Stamm (born 1958) is a German organist and freelance composer who lives in Leverkusen, near Cologne, in Germany.

== Biography ==
Stamm was born in Leverkusen, West Germany, in 1958. At the age of 7, he began study of the piano and pipe organ with Paul Wißkirchen, then organist at the Cathedral of Altenberg. At 11 years old, he began touring Europe as an organ virtuoso and recorded his first track at 13.

From 1973 to 1976, he studied organ at the Conservatoire Royal de Musique in Liège with Hubert Schoonbroodt. Later, he studied Catholic church music and piano pedagogy at the Robert-Schumann-Hochschule Düsseldorf.

Stamm is renowned for his Bach interpretations and his two DVDs recordings of selected Bach organ works on the famous Trost organ in the year 2000 for Pioneer, which is one of the most popular Bach organ albums to be put to record. He is living in Leverkusen (near Cologne), Germany, as a freelance organ virtuoso and composer.

== Compositions (selection) ==
- Stage works:
  - Fairy tale opera The Star Child after Oscar Wilde, Libretto: Alexander Nitzberg.
  - Fairy tale opera Peronnik and the treasure of the dark king after a breton grail tale, Libretto: Alexander Nitzberg.
  - Fairy tale opera Die Zaubertruhe (The magical chest) Libretto: Alexander Nitzberg.
- Choir works:
  - Cantata Christ, the heavenly Phoenix for 4prt mixed choir, string orchestra (or piano), oboe and timpani ad lib.
  - Missa gioiosa for 3 or 4prt mixed choir or 3prt female or male choir
  - Kölner Pueri cantores Messe for 2-4prt mixed choir oder 3prt mixed choir
  - Hymn Lobet Gott (Praise the Lord, Psalm 150) for 4prt mixed choir and organ, timpani ad lib.
- Instrumental works (with orchestra):
  - Concerto for organ and string orchestra (+woodwinds and brass ad lib.)
  - Celtic Concerto for piano and string orchestra
  - Concertino for 2 violins, piano and string orchestra
- Instrumental works (chamber music ensembles):
  - Works for two trumpets and organ
  - Works for trumpet and organ
  - Ten pieces for flute and organ (or piano)
  - Eight pieces for flute and organ (or piano)
  - Organ sound and flute magic Vol. I-III
  - Works for violin and organ (or piano)
  - Six pieces for saxophone and organ
  - Little Jazz Suite or saxophone and organ (or piano)
  - Two Suites for horn and organ
  - Two suites for trombone and organ
  - String quartet
  - Salsamania for woodwind quintet
  - Concertino for flute, violin and piano
  - Suite für flute, viola (cello) and piano
  - Eight lyrical pieces for flute and piano
- Works for organ solo:
  - Organ works. Vol. I-VI
  - Four Suites for organ
  - Three choral fantasies for organ
  - Organ variations for Christmas time
- Arrangements for organ:
  - J.S. Bach - Two organ pieces
  - César Franck - Larghetto from the string quartet
  - Felix Mendelssohn - Allegro Vivace from 5^{th} symphony
