= Pavao Mašić =

Croatian harpsichordist and organist (born 1980)

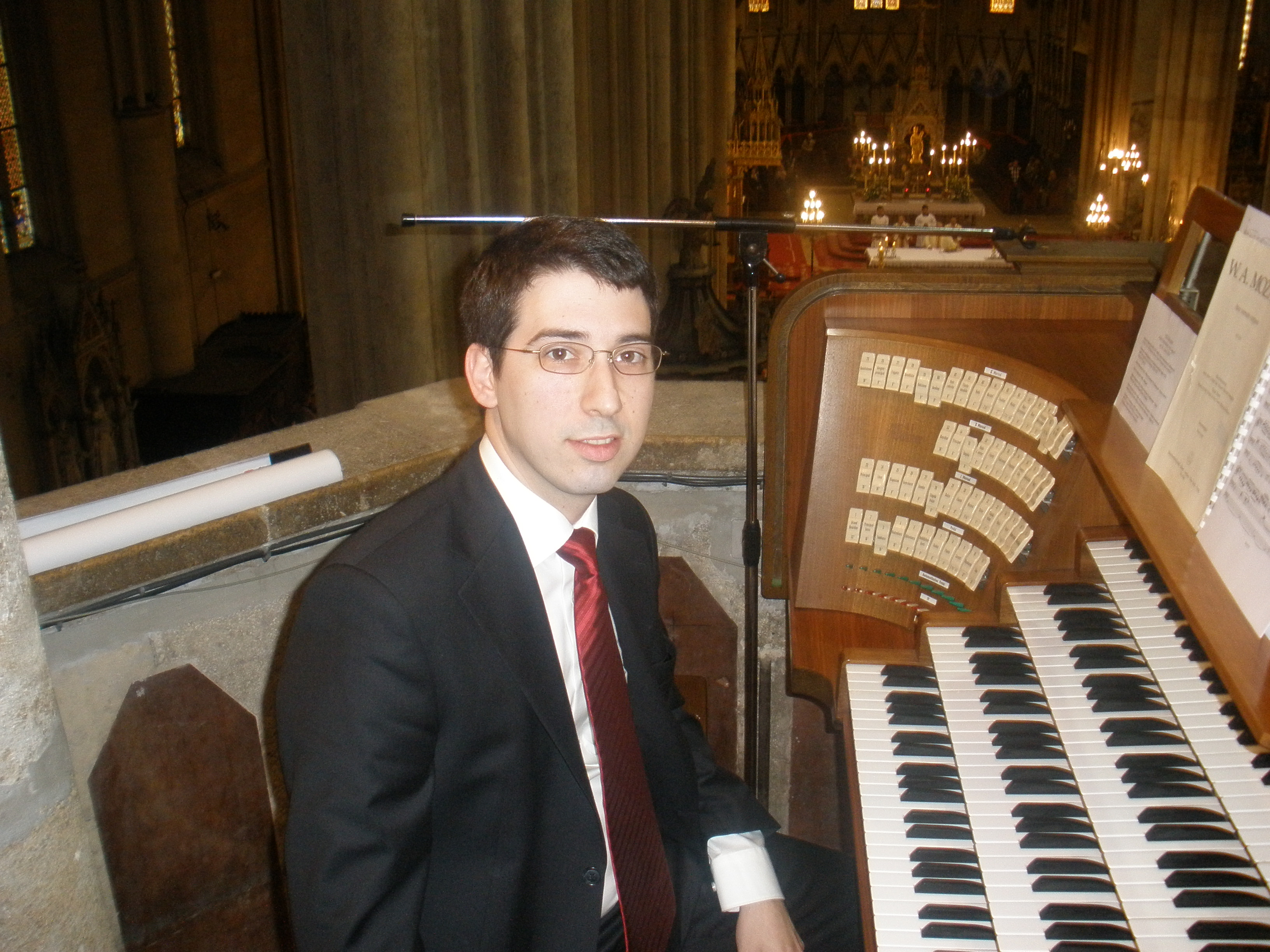
Pavao Mašić at the great Walcker organ in the Zagreb Cathedral

Pavao Mašić (born 1980 in Šibenik) is a Croatian harpsichordist and organist.

== Biography ==
=== Education ===
Pavao Mašić graduated at the Academy of Music in Zagreb in several studies: the harpsichord in the class of Višnja Mažuran, the organ in the class of Mario Penzar, and the studies of music theory. He obtained his organ master diploma (diplome de soliste) at Haute Ecole de Musique in Lausanne in the class of Kei Koito, where he studied with special emphasis the interpretation of Renaissance and Baroque repertoire on historical instruments. He also obtained MA degree of harpsichord and related keyboard instruments in the class of Dr. Robert Hill and Michael Behringer (basso continuo) at the Hochschule für Musik (Institut für Historische Aufführungspraxis) in Freiburg im Breisgau. He continues to work with some of the most prominent world harpsichordists such as Pierre Hantaï and Skip Sempé under whose artistic guidance he dedicates himself to studying the repertoire of JS Bach and French Baroque composers. Bob van Asperen, Ton Koopman, Laurence Cummings, Anđelko Klobučar, Daniel Roth, Luigi Ferdinando Tagliavini, Christoph Bossert, Katherine Bine Bryndorf are but some of the prominent artists, under whose guidance he participated in numerous international master classes devoted to the interpretation of music for harpsichord and organ.

=== Artistic activity ===
As a soloist and chamber musician, he has performed regularly at renowned music festivals home and abroad (Italy, Spain, Germany, Switzerland, Russia, Czech Republic). As a soloist he has performed with the Croatian Baroque Ensemble, Baroque Ensemble La Risonanza, Varazdin Chamber Orchestra, Symphonic Wind Orchestra of the Croatian Army and the Zagreb Philharmonic Orchestra (with whom he premiered Carillon, the Concerto for Organ and Orchestra by Ante Knešaurek in 2006). He occasionally works with various soloists and ensembles such as the Zagreb Soloists, the Croatian Baroque Ensemble, Symphony Orchestra of Croatian Radio and Television Chamber Orchestra, Munich Philharmonic Chamber Orchestra, Berlin Philharmonic scholarship orchestra, and the Slovenian Philharmonic Orchestra.

Since 1999 he is the principal organist of the Church of St. Mark in Zagreb, where he collaborates with the Oratorio Choir Cantores Sancti Marci, continuing the tradition of this historical Croatian church that dates back to at least the 14th century. Since 2008 he has been employed at the Music Academy in Zagreb where he teaches harpsichord and basso continuo as the assistant to prof. Višnja Mažuran. Currently his artistic activity is being focused on the organ works by JS Bach, which, together with the organist Ante Knešaurek, he performs in series of 17 concerts on the organ of the Basilica of the Sacred Heart in Zagreb. In 2010 they jointly launched the project of integral performance of complete works for organ by Johann Sebastian Bach, which is also the first systematic and complete performance of Bach's organ works in Croatia.

=== Awards ===
He won the first awards from international competitions Grand Prix Bach de Lausanne (Switzerland, 2006), Andrea Antico de Montona (Croatia, 2006), as well as the Dean's Award for academic year 2004/2005 and Ivo Vuljević Award as the most successful young musician in 2006 according to the choice of Croatian Musical Youth. In 2009 he was one of the winners at the 1st international competition Concurso internacional CAI – Jóvenes Interpretes de Organo, held in Zaragoza, Spain, and in 2010 he received the Annual Award of Association of University Teachers and Other Scholars in Zagreb. Particularly successful 2010 season was crowned with all the three prizes by Varaždin Baroque Evenings which are traditionally awarded to outstanding festival artists and performers. Although only making his début at Varaždin Baroque Evenings, in the 40th jubilee edition of this renowned Croatian music festival Pavao Mašić received three important awards: Ivan Lukačić Award for a harpsichord recital with the ensemble Symblema, Jurica Murai Award for solo organ recital as the best performance in 40the Varaždin Baroque Evenings and Vjesnik Award Kantor for the best interpretation of compositions by JS Bach.
