= Byron Melcher =

American executive and organist (1929–2012)

Byron Melcher (1929–2012) was an American executive with the Thomas Organ Company, a concert organist, and a recording artist on electronic organs and pipe organs.

Melcher was a district manager for the Thomas and Vox lines in Texas. In 1968, he was promoted to manager of promotions for the Thomas Organ division and was a featured artist on the Thomas Company "A Fair to Remember" tour the next year, with Dick Clark as MC. That summer, he became head of publicity for Thomas. In 1970, he was the Los Angeles Theater Organ Society monthly artist. His featured piece was the Overture to The Virgin of Macarena.

He recorded for Concert Recording Records, Replica Records and United Artists Records.
