= Alcée Chriss III =

American organist, composer and conductor

- Born: Texas
- Genres: Jazz, Classical
- Instruments: organ, piano, harpsichord

Alcée Chriss III is an American organist, composer and conductor from Dallas, Texas, known for incorporating jazz and gospel influences into his performances.

Chriss was raised in Dallas, where his father was a United Methodist minister. He was raised around gospel music, learning classical and jazz music on the piano before turning to the organ as a teenager. His interest in the instrument was influenced by watching Catharine Crozier on the Hour of Power. The churches he attended as a child didn't have organs, so he tracked down local organists to ask if they would take him on as a student. He studied at the Oberlin Conservatory of Music, where he obtained his bachelor's and master's degrees, before pursuing a PhD in music at McGill University, studying the organ under Hans-Ola Ericsson.

Chriss appeared in Stacey Tenenbaum's 2019 documentary Pipe Dreams alongside Yuan Shen, Thomas Gaynor, Nick Cappozoli and Sebastian Heindl as they prepared to compete in the Canadian International Organ Competition (CIOC). He credits the blending of the pipe organ with jazz music for his win at the competition, explaining: "I think the CIOC was looking to choose someone who represented the future of the organ, and I certainly can't say that I'm that, but I can say that I'm trying to do things that haven't been done before."

In 2019 Chriss joined Wesleyan University as university organist and artist-in-residence. The same year he was named the Minister of Music at St. Stephen's Episcopal Church in Ridgefield, Connecticut.

== Awards ==
- Canadian International Organ Competition (2017)
- Longwood Gardens International Organ Competition Firmin Swinnen Silver Medal (2016)
- Miami International Organ Competition First Prize (2014)

== Recordings ==
- Art & Rhapsodie (2019)
