= Balázs Szabó =

Balázs Szabó (born 22 February 1985 in Miskolc) is a Hungarian organist, harmonium d'art player and Organ Expert.

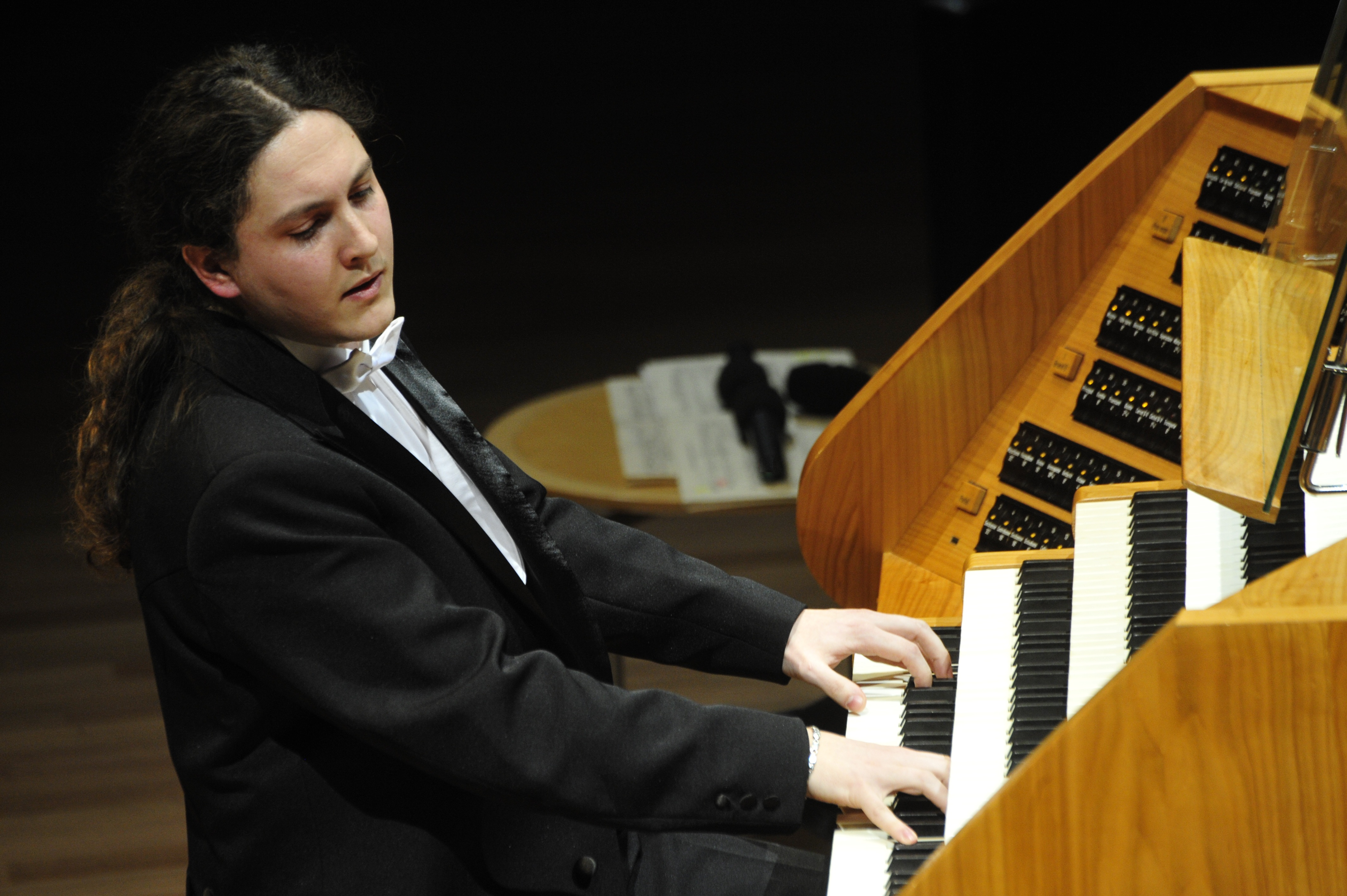
Balázs Szabó

== Biography ==
Balázs Szabó began his musical studies at the age of 15, graduated from the Franz Liszt Academy of Music in Budapest and went on to continue his studies in Germany and Italy. In 2010 he received the master organist title from the University of Music Wuerzburg with the mentoring of Dr. Christoph Bossert. He won first Prizes at three international organ competitions: St. Maurice, Switzerland(2007), Biarritz, France (2009) and the Internationale Orgelwoche Nürnberg (ION) (2011). He received the City of Miskolc Standard of Excellence Award, and the Junior Prima Prize. Since 2011 he holds a teaching position at the Franz Liszt Academy of Music in Budapest. Balázs Szabó was appointed University professor from March 1 at the MDW, the University of Music and Performing Arts Vienna. The university is one of the world's oldest, largest and best known universities in the performing arts of music. Balázs Szabó is the successor of Martin Haselböck in this position.

Balázs Szabó concluded OrganExpert training in Rome and Trossingen, the world's only degree course for those who will consult church or national institutions as well as private people with organ projects (designing new organs and copies of historical instruments, supervising the maintenance, conservation and restoration of existing instruments)- presided over by the Vatican (Council of culture). He is one of the 5 graduated OrganExperts in the world.

== Main awards ==
1. prizes at International organ competitions:

- Premier Prix in St. Maurice (Swiss) (2007)
- Grand Prix und Prix Spécial in Biarritz (France) (2009)
- 1. Price at the 60. Internationalen Orgelwoche Nürnberg - ION Musica Sacra (2011).
- Second Prix d'Interpretation, de 24. Grand Prix de Chartres (France) (2014)
- "Man of the Year" (2008, Hungary)
- the City of Miskolc Standard of Excellence Award(2010)
- Junior Prima Award (2010).

== Recordings ==
Max Reger: "per aspera ad astra" Die 7 Choralfantasien 2016, 2 SACD, aufgenommen an historische Originalinstrumente der Reger-Zeit (MDG 920 1945-6).

== Publications ==
- "Zur Orgelmusik Max Regers" in: Studien zur Orgelmusik Band 5, ed. M. Heinemann, Dr. J. Butz Bonn 2016. ISBN 978-3-928412-19-3

- „Länderbericht Ungarn“ in: Bernhard Billeter/Markus T. Funck/Michael G. Kaufmann (Hrsg.): Orgel/Orgue/Organo/Organ/2011, Dokumentation|Länderberichte-Dokumentation|Country reports, ISBN 978-3-9809-23279, Verlag Organum Buch, DE-74613, Öhrigen 2014, 218–220.

- „Egy ideális orgona Budapesten“, Magyar Egyházzene XVIII (2010/2011) 71–83.
