= Three chorale fantasias, Op. 52 =

1900 compositions by Max Reger

Three chorale fantasias
- by Max Reger
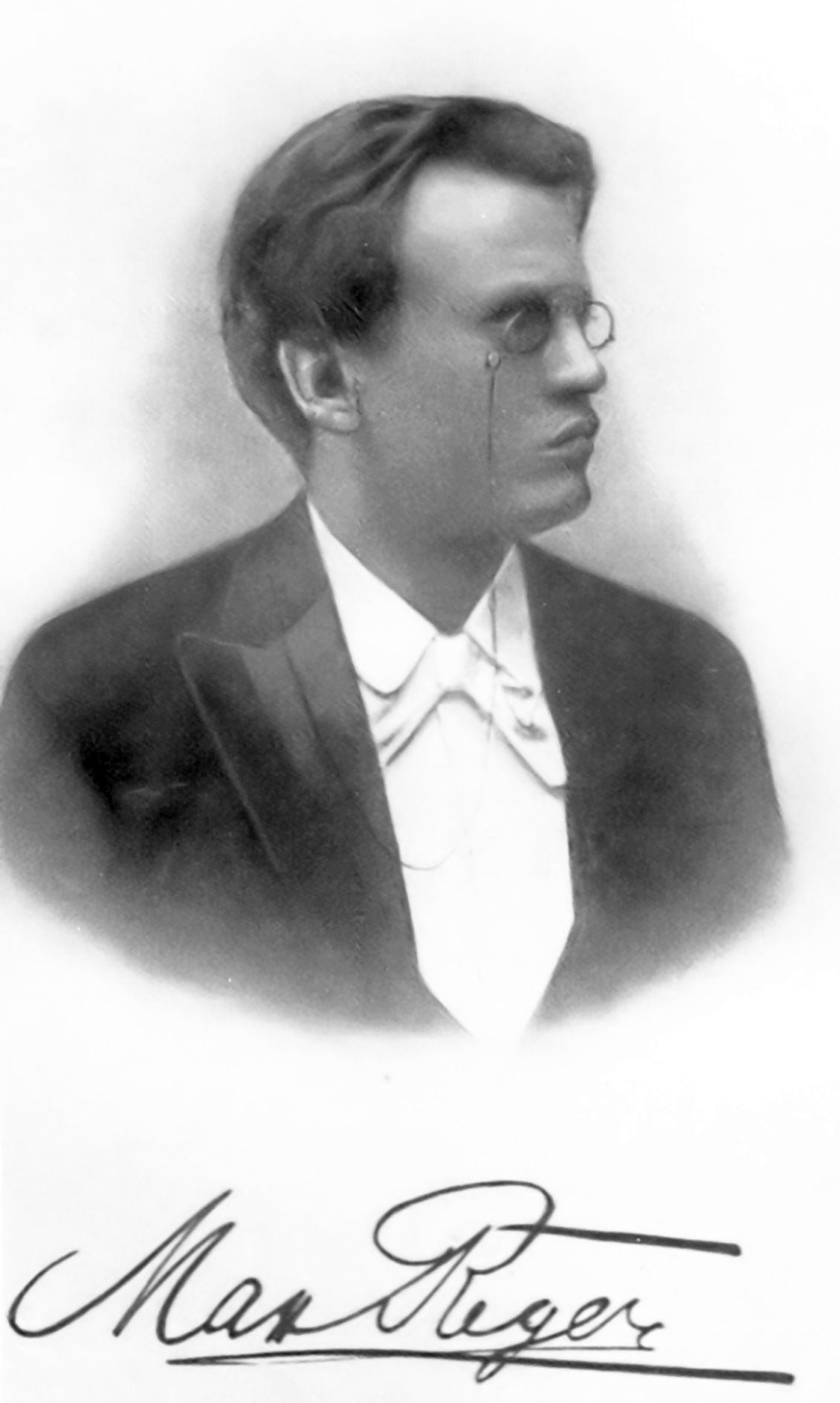
- Reger in 1901
- Opus: 52
- Based on: "Alle Menschen müssen sterben"; "Wachet auf, ruft uns die Stimme"; Halleluja! Gott zu loben bleibe meine Seelenfreud"
- Composed: 1900
- Dedication: Julius Smend; Karl Straube; Friedrich L. Schnackenberg

Three chorale fantasias (Drei Choralphantasien), Op. 52, are chorale fantasias for organ by Max Reger. He composed the fantasias on three chorales in September 1900: Phantasie über den Choral "Alle Menschen müssen sterben", Phantasie über den Choral "Wachet auf, ruft uns die Stimme" and Phantasie über den Choral "Halleluja! Gott zu loben bleibe meine Seelenfreud". They were all first performed individually by Reger's friend Karl Straube, and were first published by Breitkopf & Härtel.

Straube and others regarded especially No. 2 highly, Straube called it "großartigste Leistung" (most extraordinary achievement).

== History ==
Reger composed the works in September 1900 in Weiden in der Oberpfalz. He dated No. 2 on 15 September 1900, and sent the works to the publisher on 22 October 1900. Reger wrote dedications:

1. Sr. Hochwürden Herrn Professor Dr. Julius Smend hochachtungsvollst zugeeignet (Most respectfully dedicated to the Very Reverend Professor Dr Julius Smend)
2. Meinem Freunde Karl Straube in herzlichster Dankbarkeit zugeeignet (Dedicated to my friend Karl Straube, with cordial gratitude)
3. Herrn Friedrich L. Schnackenberg hochachtungsvollst zugeeignet (Most respectfully dedicated to Mr Friedrich L. Schnackenberg)

No. 1 was first performed by Karl Straube in the summer of 1901 at the Sauer organ of the Willibrordi Dom in Wesel. No. 2 was first performed by Straube at that organ on 28 April 1901, and repeated on 12 May 1901 at the Garnisonkirche in Berlin. No. 3 was first performed by Straube on 9 November 1901 at the Walcker organ of the Kaim-Saal in Munich.

The duration is given as 16–17 min. for No. 1, 17–19 min. for No. 2, 15–17 min for No. 3.

== Pieces ==
=== No. 1 ===
The text of the chorale "Alle Menschen müssen sterben" was written by Johann Georg Albinus in 1652. The melody was probably composed by Jacob Hintze (1678):

The fantasia is structured in six sections, based on four of the seven stanzas of the hymn.

1. Introduzione
2. Strophe I Alle Menschen müssen sterben ("All men must die")
3. Interlude
4. Strophe III Jesus ist für mich gestorben ("Jesus died for me")
5. Strophe VI O Jerusalem, du schöne ("O Jerusalem the lovely")
6. Strophe VII Ach, ich habe schon erblicket ("Ah, mine eyes have truly seen")

Unlike other chorale fantasias, this work ends not with a fugue. It alternates stanzas with relation to the chorale tune with free stanzas. The introduction (Introduzione) presents several motifs, including a large leap downward as a Todesmotiv (motif of death), and a downward sequence of chords as an Auferstehungsmotiv (motif of resurrection).

Reger wrote a copy for Straube and added the dedication: "Recht inniges Vergnügen, lieber Carl! Im Falle es beim Anhören dieses 'Verbrechens' Todte geben sollte, übernehme ich die Beerdigungskosten. Besten Gruß Dein alter Organiste Max Reger" ("Quite heartfelt pleasure, dear Carl! In case of deaths when listening to this 'crime', I will assume the costs of the funerals. Best greeting, your old organist, Max Reger").

=== No. 2 ===
The fantasia is based on Philipp Nicolai's hymn in three stanzas "Wachet auf, ruft uns die Stimme", published in 1599.

Reger uses the last lines as they still appeared in the Evangelisches Kirchengesangbuch (EKG) of 1950:

Philipp Nicolai 1599

Deß sind wir froh / jo / jo
Ewig in dulci iubilo.

Op. 52/2

Des jauchzen wir und singen dir
das Halleluja für und für.

mm. 80–83 of the Fantasia No. 2 with markings for articulation in Straube's book

The fantasia is structured in four parts, an introduction and one four each stanza, the last one as a fugue:

1. Introduzione
2. Strophe I Wachet auf! ruft uns die Stimme
3. Strophe II Zion hört die Wächter singen
4. Fuge und Strophe III Gloria sei dir gesungen

The introduction is marked grave assai. Form and rhythm of the beginning, marked pppp, appear undecided. The sombre atmosphere is interrupted only by two forceful entries (marked fff) which have been characterized as "niedersausende Blitze" (striking lightning). Martin Weyer regarded the section as contrasting quiet night and commencing judgement".

The chorale tune appears first in measure 11, in "sehr lichte Registrierung" (very light registration). The lines of the poem are interrupted by interludes. Reger establishes a contrast of "himmlische Herrlichkeit" (heavenly glory) and "irdische Finsternis" (earthly darkness).[Straube notes:

Die Einleitung zu "Wachet auf" bezeichnete Max Reger als den "Kirchhof" und die Choralmelodie ist die Stimme eines Engels, die Toten werden allmählich erweckt; Dis-E-Dis (Takte 18 ff.) im Pedal deutet symbolisch, wie sie sich in den Gräbern rühren. So hat mir mein Freund sein künstlerisches Wollen gedeutet. (Reger described the introduction of "Wachet auf" as the churchyard, and the chorale melody the voice of an angel; the dead are raised gradually; the figure "D-sharp / E / D-sharp" (measures 18 ff.) in the pedal symbolize how they move in their graves. This is how my friend explained his artistic intention.)

— Straube in a letter to Hans Klotz on 28 June 1944

=== No. 3 ===
The text of the chorale "Halleluja! Gott zu loben" was written by Matthias Jorissen as a paraphrase of Psalm 146. The melody is by Johann Georg Bätzler.

The fantasie is structured in an introduction, marked vivace assai – vivacissimo, and seven chorale stanzas, concluded by a coda:

1. Introducion
2. Strophe I Hallelujah! Gott zu loben
3. Strophe II Setzt auf Fürsten kein Vertrauen
4. Strophe III Heil dem, der im Erdenleben
5. Strophe IV Er, der Himmel, Meer und Erde
6. Strophen V Er ist's, der den Fremdling schützet and VI Er, der Herr, ist's, der den Blinden
7. Fugue and Strophe VII Er ist Gott und Herr und König

In the coda, the first two lines of the chorale melody as a canon in soprano and bass.

== Editions ==
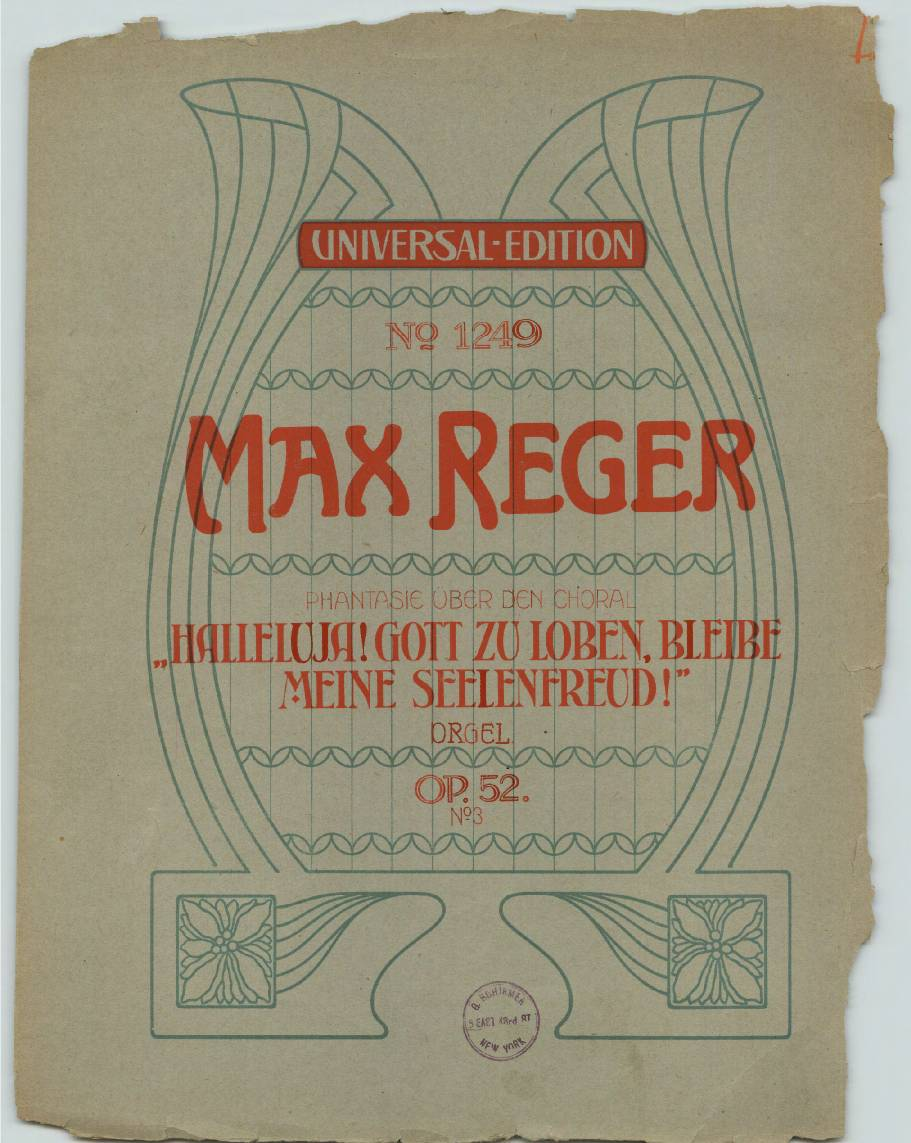
Title page of No. 3, Universal Edition 1901

- Reger, Max. Sämtliche Orgelwerke. Vol. Band 6. Choralfantasien. Wiesbaden/Leipzig/Paris: Breitkopf & Härtel. pp. 91–147.
- —. Phantasie über den Choral "Alle Menschen müssen sterben". Vienna: Universal Edition.
- —. Phantasie über den Choral "Wachet auf, ruft uns die Stimme". Vienna: Universal Edition.
- —. Phantasie über den Choral "Halleluja! Gott zu loben". Vienna: Universal Edition.

== Selected recordings ==
On organs from Reger's era:

- Christoph Bossert: Max Reger. Drei Choralfantasien Op. 52. recorded in 1990 at the Link organ of the Protestant Church in Giengen an der Brenz
- Christoph Bossert: Max Reger. Drei Choralphantasien Op. 52. recorded in 2006 at the Link organ
- Martin Sander: Max Reger. Orgelwerke Vol. 2. (organ of the Riga Cathedral; Op. 52 No. 2)
- Balázs Szabó: Max Reger. Die 7 Choralfantasien, SACD No. 2: Op. 52, recorded in 2015 at the Kuhn organ (1914) of St. Anton in Zurich

On modern organs:

- Jean-Baptiste Dupont: Max Reger. Sämtliche Orgelwerke Vol. 1. (organ of the Magdeburg Cathedral; Op. 52 Nos. 1–3)
- Kari Vuola: Max Reger: Orgelwerke. Drei Phantasien für Orgel Op. 52. (organ of the Tampere Cathedral;, Op. 52 Nos. 1–3)
