= Carole Terry =

American musician

Carole R. Terry
- Born: December 30, 1948 (age 77); Southampton, NY, USA
- Education: Southern Methodist University; Eastman School of Music
- Alma mater: Stanford University
- Occupations: Organist; pedagogue

Carole Ruth Terry (born December 30, 1948, in Southampton, NY) is an American organist, harpsichordist, and pedagogue.

== Biography ==
Carole Terry studied at Southern Methodist University in Dallas, Texas (organ with Robert T. Anderson, harpsichord with Larry Palmer), at the Eastman School of Music in Rochester, NY (organ with David Craighead), and at Stanford University, where she graduated in 1977 with a Doctor of Musical Arts degree in Early Music Performance Practice. Her teachers in Stanford were Herbert Nanney (organ), Margaret Fabrizio (harpsichord), and Joan Benson (fortepiano and clavichord). From 1979 until her retirement in 2019, she was professor of organ and harpsichord at the University of Washington School of Music in Seattle. From 2000 until 2003, she was Resident Organist and curator of the C. B. Fisk organ at Benaroya Hall in Seattle.

As organist and harpsichordist, she has performed throughout the United States, Europe, and Asia, and frequently serves as jury member for international organ competitions and lecturer for master classes in keyboard performance practice.

== Discography ==
- Brombaugh organs of the Northwest.
  - Works of John Dowland, Melchior Schildt, Samuel Scheidt, Jan Pieterszoon Sweelinck, Peter Mohrhardt, Heinrich Scheidemann, and Matthias Weckmann. Recorded in June 1983 on the John Brombaugh organs at Grace Episcopal Church in Ellensburg, WA, Christ Episcopal Church in Tacoma, and Central Lutheran Church in Eugene, OR. Oakhurst, NJ: Musical Heritage Society, 1986. MHS 7368. 1 LP.
- 20th century harpsichord works.
  - Vincent Persichetti (Sonata No. 1 op. 51), William Albright (Four Fancies), Ned Rorem (Spiders), and Henry Cowell (Set of four). Recorded in August and November 1985 in Seattle. New York, NY: CRI, 1986 CRI SD 533. 1 LP.
- The complete organ works of Johannes Brahms.
  - Flentrop organ at St. Mark's Episcopal Cathedral, Seattle. Oakhurst, NJ: Musical Heritage Society, 1990. MHS 512523M. 1 CD.
- Carole Terry in Schwerin.
  - Works by Johann Gottlob Töpfer, August Wilhelm Bach, Johann Georg Herzog, Johann Christian Heinrich Rinck, Josef Rheinberger, Julius Reubke, August Gottfried Ritter, Ernst Friedrich Richter, Robert Schumann, Felix Mendelssohn, Johannes Brahms, and Johann Friedrich Ludwig Thiele. Recorded in August 1996 on the Friedrich Ladegast organ at Schwerin Cathedral, Germany. Seattle: Ambassador Recording Corporation, 1998. ARC 1021. 2 CDs.
- Carole Terry plays the Watjen concert organ.
  - Works by Felix Mendelssohn, Jan Pieterszoon Sweelinck, William Albright, Johann Sebastian Bach, John Stanley, Robert Schumann, Louis Vierne, and Charles-Marie Widor. Recorded December 13 and 20, 2004, and in September 2006, on the C. B. Fisk organ (Opus 114) at Benaroya Hall, Seattle. Seattle: Loft Recordings, 2008. LRCD-1105. 1 CD.
