= Wolfgang Rübsam =

German musician

Wolfgang Friedrich Rübsam Wolfgang Rübsam
- Born: October 16, 1946 (age 79); Gießen
- Occupations: organist, pianist, composer, pedagogue

Wolfgang Friedrich Rübsam (born October 16, 1946, in Gießen) is a German-American organist, pianist, composer and pedagogue.

== Biography ==
After his musical training with Erich Ackermann in Fulda, Germany, Rübsam studied at the Musikhochschule in Frankfurt am Main with Helmut Walcha. Additional studies in organ followed with Marie-Claire Alain in France and with Robert T. Anderson at Southern Methodist University in Dallas, Texas. He won the first prize at the International Organ Competition in Fort Wayne, Indiana and the Grand Prix de Chartres for interpretation in 1973.

In 1974, he was appointed as professor of sacred music and organ at Northwestern University. In addition, he also served as University Organist at Rockefeller Chapel at the University of Chicago from 1981 until 1997. From 1997 until 2011, he was professor of organ at the Hochschule für Musik Saar in Saarbrücken, Germany. From 1998 until 2003, he was also artist in residence and university organist at Lawrence University in Appleton, Wisconsin.

Rübsam has published more than 130 recordings, including two recordings of the complete organ works by Johann Sebastian Bach, the complete organ works of Jehan Alain, Dietrich Buxtehude, César Franck, Felix Mendelssohn, Joseph Rheinberger, and Louis Vierne, and recordings of Franz Liszt, Johann Pachelbel and Max Reger. In addition, he has recorded a major part of the keyboard works of Johann Sebastian Bach on modern Bösendorfer pianos and the lute-harpsichord. He is sound engineer and producer for the Naxos Organ Encyclopedia Series and has been in great demand as concert organist and jury member for international competitions.

Rübsam is also working as composer for the publishing houses Augsburg Fortress in Minneapolis, Minnesota and Schott Music in Mainz.

== Discography ==
=== Organ ===
- Jehan Alain: Complete works for organ Vol. 1.
  - Wolfgang Rübsam, organ. Recorded in 1973 on the Rieger organ at the Abteikirche Marienstatt. Counterpoint Classics, 2020.
- Jehan Alain: Complete works for organ Vol. 2.
  - Wolfgang Rübsam, organ. Recorded in 1973 on the Rieger organ at the Abteikirche Marienstatt. Counterpoint Classics, 2020.
- Johann Sebastian Bach: Complete organ works & The Art of Fugue.
  - Wolfgang Rübsam, organ. Recorded in 1977 on the Metzler & Söhne organ at St. Nikolaus Church, Frauenfeld, Switzerland (works on discs 1–12), and on the Hockhois/Marcussen organ in the nave of the Freiburg Münster (works on discs 13–16). Netherlands: Philips, 1993. 16 CDs.
- Johann Sebastian Bach: Preludes and Fugues.
  - Preludes and Fugues in E minor BWV 548, A major BWV 536, A minor BWV 543 and C major BWV 545 (coupled with the Largo from Trio Sonata No. 5 in C major BWV 529).
  - Wolfgang Rübsam, organ. Recorded in 1974 at Chartres Cathedral. Philips 6549950 (051007). 1 LP.
- Johann Sebastian Bach: Schübler Chorales.
  - Chorales BWV 645–650; Fantasia & Fugue BWV 537; Toccata & Fugue BWV 538; Pièce d’Orgue BWV 572; Prelude& Fugue BWV 545.
    - Wolfgang Rübsam, organ. Recorded in July 1988 at the Metzler organ of St. Michael's Church, Eutin (Germany). Naxos 8.553150. 1 CD.
- Johann Sebastian Bach: Famous Organ Works.
  - Prelude & Fugue BWV 552; Pastorella BWV 590; Toccata BWV 565; Prelude & Fugue BWV 532; Prelude & Fugue BWV 548.
    - Wolfgang Rübsam, organ. Recorded in August 1988 at the Flentrop organ (Warner Concert Hall) at the Conservatory of Music, Oberlin College, Ohio (United States). Naxos 8.550184. 1 CD.
- Johann Sebastian Bach: Trio Sonatas Nos. 1–3.
  - Trio Sonatas BWV 525–527; Prelude & Fugue BWV 543.
    - Wolfgang Rübsam, organ. Recorded in November 1989 at the Schnitger organ at the Martinikerk, Groningen (Netherlands). Naxos 8.550651. 1 CD.
- Johann Sebastian Bach: Trios Sonatas Nos. 4–6.
  - Trio Sonatas BWV 525–527; Prelude & Fugue BWV 547.
    - Wolfgang Rübsam, organ. Recorded in November 1989 at the Schnitger organ at the Martinikerk, Groningen (Netherlands). Naxos 8.550653. 1 CD.
- Johann Sebastian Bach: Preludes, Fantasias and Fugues BWV 536, 541, 542, 544 & 546.
  - Wolfgang Rübsam, organ. Recorded in November 1989 at the Schnitger organ at the Martinikerk, Groningen (Netherlands). Naxos 8.550652. 1 CD.
- Johann Sebastian Bach: The Art of Fugue Vol. 1.
  - Contrapunctus I-XV.
    - Wolfgang Rübsam, organ. Recorded in April 1992 at the Flentrop organ of Duke Chapel, Duke University, Durham, North Carolina (United States). Naxos 8.550703. 1 CD.
- Johann Sebastian Bach: The Art of Fugue Vol. 2.
  - Contrapunctus XVI-XIX; Partita sopra “Sei gegrüßet, Jesu gütig” BWV 768; Passacaglia BWV 582.
    - Wolfgang Rübsam, organ. Recorded in April 1992 at the Flentrop organ of Duke Chapel, Duke University, Durham, North Carolina (United States). Naxos 8.550704. 1 CD.
- Johann Sebastian Bach: Organ Transcriptions.
  - Six Concertos BWV 592–597; Trios BWV 585 & 586; Aria BWV 587.
    - Wolfgang Rübsam, organ. Recorded in May 1993 at the Flentrop organ of St. Mark's Cathedral, Seattle, Washington (United States). Naxos 8.550936. 1 CD.
- Johann Sebastian Bach: Organ Chorales from the Leipzig Manuscript Vol. 1.
  - Chorales BWV 651–658; Toccata, Adagio & Fugue BWV 564.
    - Wolfgang Rübsam, organ. Recorded in June 1993 at the Taylor and Boody organ at Holy Cross College, Worcester, Massachusetts (United States). Naxos 8.550901. 1 CD.
- Johann Sebastian Bach: Organ Chorales from the Leipzig Manuscript Vol. 2.
  - Chorales BWV 659–668; Canonic Variations on "Vom Himmel hoch da komm' ich her" BWV 769.
    - Wolfgang Rübsam, organ. Recorded in June 1993 at the Taylor and Boody organ at Holy Cross College, Worcester, Massachusetts (United States). Naxos 8.550927. 1 CD.
- Johann Sebastian Bach: Clavierübung III Vol. 1.
  - Prelude BWV 552; Chorales BWV 669–681.
    - Wolfgang Rübsam, organ. Recorded in July 1993 at the Silbermann organ of Freiberg Cathedral, Germany. Naxos 8.550930. 1 CD.
- Johann Sebastian Bach: Clavierübung III Vol. 2.
  - Chorales BWV 682–689; Duettos BWV 802–805; Fugue BWV 552.
    - Wolfgang Rübsam, organ. Recorded in July 1993 at the Silbermann organ of Freiberg Cathedral, Germany. Naxos 8.550930. 1 CD.
- Johann Sebastian Bach: Little Organ Book Vol. 1.
  - Chorales BWV 599–617; Preludes & Fugues BWV 531 & 534; Prelude BWV 568; Fantasia BWV 570; Fugue BWV 579.
    - Wolfgang Rübsam, organ. Recorded in January 1994 at the Flentrop organ of Duke Chapel, Duke University, Durham, North Carolina (United States). Naxos 8.553031. 1 CD.
- Johann Sebastian Bach: Little Organ Book Vol. 2.
  - Chorales BWV 618–644; Fantasia BWV 562; Prelude & Fugue BWV 539.
    - Wolfgang Rübsam, organ. Recorded in January 1994 at the Flentrop organ of Duke Chapel, Duke University, Durham, North Carolina (United States). Naxos 8.553032. 1 CD.
- Johann Sebastian Bach: Organ Works.
  - Preludes & Fugues BWV 535 & 550; Partita sopra „O Gott, du frommer Gott“ BWV 767; Trio BWV 584; Fantasia super „Valet will ich dir geben“ BWV 736; Canzona BWV 588; Allabreve BWV 589.
    - Wolfgang Rübsam, organ. Recorded in January 1994 at the Taylor and Boody organ at Holy Cross College, Worcester, Massachusetts (United States). Naxos 8.553033. 1 CD.
- Johann Sebastian Bach: Kirnberger Chorales and other organ works Vol. 1.
  - Chorales BWV 690–701; Preludes & Fugues BWV 549 & 566; Partita sopra „Christ, der du bist der helle Tag“ BWV 766; Fugue BWV 574.
    - Wolfgang Rübsam, organ. Naxos 8.553134. 1 CD.
- Johann Sebastian Bach: Kirnberger Chorales and other organ works Vol. 2.
  - Chorales BWV 702–713; Toccata & Fugue BWV 540; Fugues BWV 576 & 578; Partita sopra „Ach, was soll ich Sünder machen“ BWV 770.
    - Wolfgang Rübsam, organ. Naxos 8.553135. 1 CD.
- Johann Sebastian Bach: Organ Chorales.
  - Chorales BWV 714, 717, 718, 720, 722, 724, 725, 733–735, 737, 738, 741; Preludes & Fugues, BWV 533, 551; Prelude, BWV 569; Fugue, BWV 575; Fantasia, BWV 563
    - Wolfgang Rübsam, organ. Recorded in August 1995 at the John Brombaugh organ at Lawrence University Chapel, Appleton, Wisconsin (United States). Naxos 8.553629. 1 CD.
- 'Johann Sebastian Bach: Organ Transcriptions. Orchestral Suites 2 & 3, Chaconne, transcribed for Organ by Wolfgang Rübsam.
  - Wolfgang Rübsam, organ. Recorded at the Casavant, Opus 3762 organ (1998) at the Church of St. Louis, King of France, St. Paul, Minnesota, USA. Leeuwarden: Brilliant Classics, 2023. 1 CD.
- Dietrich Buxtehude: Organ Works Vol. 3.
  - Prelude & Fugue BuxWV 146; Ciacona BuxWV159; Te Deum laudamus BuxWV 218; Passacaglia BuxWV 161; Prelude BuxWV 142; Chorales BuxWV 180, 182–186.
    - Wolfgang Rübsam, organ. Recorded in March 2002 at the John Brombaugh organ of Central Lutheran Church, Eugene, Oregon (United States). Naxos 8.555991. 1 CD.
- Dietrich Buxtehude: Complete works for organ Vol. 1
  - Wolfgang Rübsam, organ. Counterpoint Records, 2019.
- Dietrich Buxtehude: Complete works for organ Vol. 2
  - Wolfgang Rübsam, organ. Counterpoint Records, 2019.
- Dietrich Buxtehude: Complete works for organ Vol. 3
  - Wolfgang Rübsam, organ. Counterpoint Records, 2019.
- Dietrich Buxtehude: Complete works for organ Vol. 4
  - Wolfgang Rübsam, organ. Counterpoint Records, 2019.
- Dietrich Buxtehude: Complete works for organ Vol. 5
  - Wolfgang Rübsam, organ. Counterpoint Records, 2019.
- Dietrich Buxtehude: Complete works for organ Vol. 6
  - Wolfgang Rübsam, organ. Counterpoint Records, 2019.
- François Couperin: Messe solemnelle à l'usage des paroisses.
  - Wolfgang Rübsam, organ. Callinet organ in St. Martins-Kirche in Masevaux, France. Germany: Bellaphon Records, 1983. 1 LP.
- César Franck: Works for organ.
  - Wolfgang Rübsam, organ. Recorded February 1983 at the Cathédrale St. Croix, Orléans, France. Counterpoint Records, 2020.
- Jean Adam Guilain: Suites for organ.
  - Wolfgang Rübsam, organ. Rieger Organ of the Abteikirche, Marienstatt. Neckargemünd, Germany: Da Camera, 1974. DaCa 93 263. 1 LP.
- Felix Mendelssohn: Complete organ works.
  - Wolfgang Rübsam, organ. Recorded on the Silbermann organ in Saint Pierre-le-Jeune, Strassburg, and the Metzler organ in the Jesuitenkirche, Lucerne, during the summer of 1982. Düsseldorf, Germany: Schwann Musica Mundi, 1983. 3 LPs.
- Olivier Messiaen: La Nativité du Seigneur.
  - Wolfgang Rübsam, organ. Recorded February 1983 at the Cathédrale St. Croix in Orléans, France. Counterpoint Records, 2020.
- Johann Pachelbel: Organ Works Vol. 1.
  - Prelude in d; Fantasia in g; Toccatas in C, C, c, e & g; Ricercari in c & f-sharp; Fugues in C, D & d; Komm, Gott Schöpfer heilger Geist; Gott der Vater wohn uns bei; Ciaconas in d & f; Three Christmas Chorales.
    - Wolfgang Rübsam, organ. Recorded in September 1998 at St. Peter and Paul, Weissenau (Germany). Naxos 8.554380. 1 CD.
- Max Reger: Organ works.
  - Two Chorale Fantasias op. 40; Chorale Fantasia on "Wachet auf" op. 52 No. 2.
    - Wolfgang Rübsam, organ. Rieger Organ of the Abteikirche, Marienstatt. Neckargemünd, Germany: Da Camera, 1976. 1 LP.
- Max Reger: Organ works.
  - Monologue op. 63 (excerpts), 52 easy preludes to common evangelical chorales op. 67 (excerpts).
    - Wolfgang Rübsam, organ. Rieger Organ of the Abteikirche, Marienstatt. Neckargemünd, Germany: Da Camera, 1978. 1 LP.
- Max Reger zum 125. Geburtstag.
  - Variations and Fugue on a theme by Mozart op. 132a for two pianos; Fantasia and fugue on BACH op. 46; Chorale Fantasia on "Halleluja! Gott zu loben" op. 52 No. 3.
    - Wolfgang Rübsam (op. 52) and Andreas Rothkopf (op. 46), pianos and organ. Recorded September 1998 at Fulda Cathedral (op. 46 & 52) and the Hochschule für Musik Saar in Saarbrücken, Germany (op. 132a). Mainz: Wergo, 1998.
- Max Reger: Organ works, Vol. 15.
  - Wolfgang Rübsam, organ. Recorded at Rockefeller Memorial Chapel, University of Chicago. Naxos 8.572908. 1 CD.
- Josef Rheinberger: Organ Works Vol. 1.
  - Sonata I in c minor op. 28; Sonata II in A-Flat major op. 65; Sonata III in G major op. 88; Sonata IV in a minor op. 98.
    - Wolfgang Rübsam, organ. Recorded in June 1998 at the Sauer/Rieger organ of Fulda Cathedral, Germany. Naxos 8.554212. 1 CD.
- Josef Rheinberger: Organ Works Vol. 2.
  - Sonata V in f-sharp minor op. 111; Sonata VI in e-flat minor op. 119; Sonata VII in f minor op. 127.
    - Wolfgang Rübsam, organ. Recorded in June 1998 at the Sauer/Rieger organ of Fulda Cathedral, Germany. Naxos 8.554213. 1 CD.
- Josef Rheinberger: Organ Works Vol. 3.
  - Sonata VIII in e minor op. 132; Sonata IX in b-flat minor op. 142; Ten Trios op. 49.
    - Wolfgang Rübsam, organ. Recorded at the Sauer/Rieger organ of Fulda Cathedral, Germany. Naxos 8.554549. 1 CD.
- Josef Rheinberger: Organ Works Vol. 4.
  - Sonata X in b minor op. 146; Sonata XI in d minor op. 148; Trios op. 189 Nos. 1–5.
    - Wolfgang Rübsam, organ. Recorded at the Sauer/Rieger organ of Fulda Cathedral, Germany. Naxos 8.554809. 1 CD.
- Josef Rheinberger: Organ Works Vol. 5.
  - Sonata XII in D-flat major op. 154; Sonata XIII in E-flat major op. 161; Trios op. 189 Nos. 6–12.
    - Wolfgang Rübsam, organ. Recorded in January 2002 at the Sauer/Rieger organ of Fulda Cathedral, Germany. Naxos 8.557184. 1 CD.
- Josef Rheinberger: Organ Works Vol. 6.
  - Sonata XIV in C major op. 165; Sonata XV in D major op. 168; Sonata XVI in g-sharp minor op. 175.
    - Wolfgang Rübsam, organ. Recorded in April 2007 at the Sauer/Rieger organ of Fulda Cathedral, Germany. Naxos 8.570313. 1 CD.
- Josef Rheinberger: Organ Works Vol. 7.
  - Sonata XVII in B major op. 181 (Fantasie-Sonata); Sonata XVIII in A major op. 188; Prelude and Fugue in D minor JWV 10; Monologues op. 162 Nos. 1–6.
    - Wolfgang Rübsam, organ. Recorded in May 2007 at the Sauer/Rieger organ of Fulda Cathedral, Germany. Naxos 8.570314. 1 CD.
- Josef Rheinberger: Organ Works Vol. 8.
  - Sonata XIX in G minor op. 193; Sonata XX in F major op. 196 ("Zur Friedensfeier"); Prelude and Fugue in C minor JWV 16.
    - Wolfgang Rübsam, organ. Recorded in May 2007 at the Sauer/Rieger organ of Fulda Cathedral, Germany. Naxos 8.570315. 1 CD.
- Georg Philipp Telemann: Selected Organ Works.
  - Wolfgang Rübsam, organ. D.C. Gloger organ in St. Nikolai Church, Cadenberge, Germany. Neckargemünd, Germany: Da Camera, 1974. 1 LP.
- Louis Vierne: Complete organ music.
  - Wolfgang Rübsam, organ. Recorded at St. François-de-Sales, Lyon, St. Antoine-des-Quinze-Vingts, Paris, France, and Rockefeller Memorial Chapel, University of Chicago. Leeuwarden: Brilliant Classics, 2022. 8 CDs.
- Helmut Walcha: Chorale Preludes Vol. 1.
  - Wolfgang Rübsam, organ. Recorded at First Presbyterian Church, Springfield, IL. Naxos 8.572910. 1 CD.
- Helmut Walcha: Chorale Preludes Vol. 2.
  - Wolfgang Rübsam, organ. Recorded at First Presbyterian Church, Springfield, IL. Naxos 8.572911. 1 CD.
- Johann Gottfried Walther: 15 Barockkonzerte für Orgel nach verschiedenen Meistern der deutschen und italienischen Schule.
  - Wolfgang Rübsam, organ. Recorded 1982 at the Cathedral of St. Martin in Colmar, France. Cologne, Germany: Deutsche Harmonia Mundi, 1982. 3 LPs.
- Charles-Marie Widor: Organ Symphonies Vol. 1.
  - Symphonies Nos. 1 and 2, Op. 13.
    - Wolfgang Rübsam, organ. Recorded at Rockefeller Memorial Chapel, University of Chicago. Naxos 8.574161. 1 CD.
- Charles-Marie Widor: Organ Symphonies Vol. 2.
  - Symphonies Nos. 3 and 4, Op. 13.
    - Wolfgang Rübsam, organ. Recorded at Rockefeller Memorial Chapel, University of Chicago. Naxos 8.574195. 1 CD.
- Charles-Marie Widor: Symphony No. 5 op. 42.
  - & Andante sostenuto from Symphonie Gothique op. 70.
    - Wolfgang Rübsam, organ. Recorded February 1983 at the Cathedral of St. Croix in Orléans, France. Germany: Signum, 1983. 1 LP.
- The C.B. Fisk Organ, Opus 101, at Southern Methodist University.
  - Works of Grigny (Pange lingua), Tournemire (Paraphrase-Carillon), Zwillich (Praeludium), Buxtehude (Praeludium in A Major, BuxWV 151), Bach (Trio Sonata VI in G Major, BWV 530), and Reger (Chorale Fantasia on "Wachet auf, ruft uns die Stimme", op. 52, No. 2).
    - Robert T. Anderson (Grigny, Tournemire, Zwillich) und Wolfgang Rübsam (Buxtehude, Bach, Reger), organ. Recorded in June 1994 (Anderson) and July 1994 (Rübsam) on the C. B. Fisk organ at Caruth Auditorium, Southern Methodist University in Dallas, Texas. Valparaiso, IN: RMC Classics, 1994. 1 CD.
- Orchestral Dreams.
  - Works of Percy Whitlock (Sonata in c minor) and Louis Vierne (Adagio from Symphony VI op. 59; Marche triomphale op. 46).
    - Wolfgang Rübsam, organ. Recorded 1992 (Vierne) and 1997 (Whitlock) at Rockefeller Memorial Chapel, University of Chicago. Saarbrücken, Germany: IFO Records, 2003. 1 CD.
- The romantic organ.
  - Works of Edward Elgar (Sonata op. 28), Max Reger (Straf mich nicht op. 40 No. 2), Charles-Marie Widor (Toccata from Symphony No. 5), and Franz Liszt (Ad nos).
    - Wolfgang Rübsam, organ. Recorded November 1988 at Rockefeller Memorial Chapel, University of Chicago. Bietigheim: Bayer Records, 1988. BR 100 049. 1 CD.
- Soli Deo Gloria: The Reddel Memorial Organ.
  - Works of Marchand, Bach, Scheidemann, Buxtehude, Widor and Dupré.
    - Wolfgang Rübsam, organ. Recorded 1996 at the Chapel of the Resurrection, Valparaiso University, Indiana. Valparaiso, IN: VUCA Media, 1999. 1 CD.
- Wolfgang Rübsam live in concert.
  - Works of Louis Vierne, Max Reger ("Wachet auf" op. 52 No. 2), Julius Reubke (94th Psalm), and Jehan Alain (Trois Danses).
    - Wolfgang Rübsam, organ. Recorded February 2003 on the Stahlhut/Jann organ at St. Martin in Dudelange, Luxembourg. Saarbrücken, Germany: IFO Records, 2003. 1 CD.

=== Piano ===
- Johann Sebastian Bach: English Suites Nos. 1–3.
  - Wolfgang Rübsam, piano. Naxos 8.553012. 1 CD.
- Johann Sebastian Bach: English Suites Nos. 4–6.
  - Wolfgang Rübsam, piano. Naxos 8.553013. 1 CD.
- Johann Sebastian Bach: French Suites Nos. 1 & 2, Italian Concerto, Chromatic Fantasia and Fugue.
  - Italian Concerto BWV 971; Chromatic Fantasia & Fugue BWV 903; French Suite in d minor BWV 812; French Suite in c minor BWV 813.
    - Wolfgang Rübsam, piano. Naxos 8.550709. 1 CD.
- Johann Sebastian Bach: French Suites Nos. 3–6.
  - Wolfgang Rübsam, piano. Naxos 8.550710. 1 CD.
- Johann Sebastian Bach: From the Notebook for W. F. Bach; 5 Little Preludes BWV 539–543.
  - Wolfgang Rübsam, piano. Naxos 8.553097. 1 CD.
- Johann Sebastian Bach: Inventions and Sinfonias.
  - Wolfgang Rübsam, piano. Naxos 8.550960. 1 CD.
- Johann Sebastian Bach: Partitas Nos. 1 & 2.
  - Partitas BWV 825 & 826; Prelude & Fughetta BWV 902; Capriccio BWV 992.
    - Wolfgang Rübsam, piano. Naxos 8.550692. 1 CD.
- Johann Sebastian Bach: Partitas Nos. 3 & 4.
  - Wolfgang Rübsam, piano. Naxos 8.550693. 1 CD.
- Johann Sebastian Bach: Partitas Nos. 5 & 6.
  - Wolfgang Rübsam, piano. Recorded in May 1992 in Valparaiso, Indiana (United States). Naxos 8.550694. 1 CD.
- Johann Sebastian Bach: Toccatas BWV 910–916.
  - Wolfgang Rübsam, piano. Recorded in September 1989 in Heidelberg, Germany. Naxos 8.550708. 1 CD.

=== Lute-Harpsichord ===
- Johann Sebastian Bach: The Art of Fugue, BWV 1080, Vol. 1.
  - Wolfgang Rübsam, Lute-Harpsichord. Counterpoint Records, 2017.
- Johann Sebastian Bach: The Art of Fugue, BWV 1080, Vol. 2.
  - Wolfgang Rübsam, Lute-Harpsichord. Counterpoint Records, 2017.
- Johann Sebastian Bach: Cello Suites Nos. 1–3, BWV 1007-1009 (Arr. W. Rübsam for Lute-Harpsichord).
  - Wolfgang Rübsam, Lute-Harpsichord. Counterpoint Records, 2017.
- Johann Sebastian Bach: Cello Suites Nos. 4–6, BWV 1010-1012 (Arr. W. Rübsam for Lute-Harpsichord).
  - Wolfgang Rübsam, Lute-Harpsichord. Counterpoint Records, 2017.
- Johann Sebastian Bach: French Suites BWV 812–817.
  - Wolfgang Rübsam, Lute-Harpsichord. Leeuwarden: Brilliant Classics, 2020. 2 CDs.
- Johann Sebastian Bach: Goldberg Variations, BWV 988.
  - Wolfgang Rübsam, Lute-Harpsichord. Naxos 8.573921. 1 CD.
- Johann Sebastian Bach: Partitas BWV 825–830.
  - Wolfgang Rübsam, Lute-Harpsichord. Leeuwarden: Brilliant Classics, 2022. 2 CDs.
- Johann Sebastian Bach: Toccatas BWV 910–916.
  - Wolfgang Rübsam, Lute-Harpsichord. Leeuwarden: Brilliant Classics, 2022. 2 CDs.
- Johann Sebastian Bach: Das wohltemperierte Clavier.
  - Wolfgang Rübsam, Lute-Harpsichord. Counterpoint Records, 2017–2018.
- Johann Sebastian Bach: Violin Solo Works Transcribed, Vol. 1, BWV 1001–1003.
  - Wolfgang Rübsam, Lute-Harpsichord. Counterpoint Records, 2018.
- Johann Sebastian Bach: Violin Solo Works Transcribed, Vol. 2, BWV 1004–1006.
  - Wolfgang Rübsam, Lute-Harpsichord. Counterpoint Records, 2018.
- Georg Böhm: Keyboard Suites Nos. 1–5, Vol. 1.
  - Wolfgang Rübsam, Lute-Harpsichord. Counterpoint Records, 2017.
- Georg Böhm: Keyboard Suites Nos. 6–11, Vol. 2.
  - Wolfgang Rübsam, Lute-Harpsichord. Counterpoint Records, 2017.
- Johann Pachelbel: Hexachordum Apollinis.
  - Wolfgang Rübsam, Lute-Harpsichord. Counterpoint Records, 2017.
- Sylvius Leopold Weiss: Sonatas for Lute transcribed.
  - Wolfgang Rübsam, Lute-Harpsichord. Leeuwarden: Brilliant Classics, 2021. 1 CD.

== Compositions for organ ==
- Fourteen Chorale Preludes: A Guide to Liturgical Improvisation. Minneapolis: Augsburg Fortress, 2010.
- In dulci iubilo: 10 Choralbearbeitungen zur Advents- und Weihnachtszeit. Mainz: Schott, 2011.
- Christ ist erstanden: 10 Choralbearbeitungen für die Fastenzeit und Ostern. Mainz: Schott, 2012.
- 50 Hymn Trios: Hymns for the church year. Brentwood, TN: Jubilate, 2022.
- 50 Hymn Trios, Volume 2: Hymns for communion and general use. Brentwood, TN: Jubilate, 2024.
- Tunes Workbook: Twenty Hymn Trios. Manual – Pedal coordination studies for beginning organists. Inver Grove Heights, MN: www.wolfgangrubsam.com, 2025.

== Bibliography ==
- Rübsam, Wolfgang: "Some Aspects of Smart Organ Fingerings or "the best cheater tricks in town." The Diapason 98 (June 2007): 20–21.
- Rübsam, Wolfgang. "Intelligente Fingersätze: Praktische Ratschläge zur Ökonomie des Orgelübens." Organ: Journal für die Orgel 1 (2007): 28–36.
- Rübsam, Wolfgang. "Zur Methodik des Orgelübens: Von der Not, der Notwendigkeit und den verborgenen Freuden einer leidigen Pflicht." Organ: Journal für die Orgel 3 (2000): 24–29.

== See also ==
- List of organists
- artist website https://www.wolfgangrubsam.com/biography

== Sources and further reading ==
- Adolph, Wolfram. "Vom Primat des Hörens. Interview mit Wolfgang Rübsam." Organ: Journal für die Orgel 1 (2003): 26–32.
- Ekowski, Christian. "Der Glenn Gould der Orgelbank. Wolfgang Rübsam - Grenzgänger zwischen den Welten." Organ: Journal für die Orgel 1 (2003): 21–24.
- Pâris, Alain (ed.). Lexikon der Interpreten klassischer Musik im 20. Jahrhundert. Translated and revised by Rudolf Kimmig. Kassel, Germany: Bärenreiter, 1992.
