= Nicolas Kynaston =

Nicolas Kynaston (10 December 1941 – 26 March 2025) was an English organist. He won a RCO medal in 2019, as well as a Deutscher Schallplattenpreis.
