= My Lady Carey's Dompe =

- by Anonymous
- Key: G Dorian
- Year: c. 1520s
- Genre: Renaissance music
- Style: Melancholic love song
- Occasion: William Carey's death
- Dedication: To William Carey's wife. mother, and/or sisters

My Lady Carey's Dompe is a Renaissance musical piece, most probably written for lute and harpsichord. A traditional English dance tune, it was written c. 1520s by an unknown composer during the time of Henry VIII, who played various instruments, of which he had a large collection.

The work appears in a single source written around 1530, British Library, manuscript Royal Appendix 58 (Roy. App. 58) f. 44v-45v.

== History ==
My Lady Carey's Dompe is sometimes attributed to English innovative composer of the early Tudor period, Hugh Aston. It is in G Dorian mode and consists of an improvisatory treble line over a drone alternating between two bass notes, G and D. It may have been written for the death of William Carey, a courtier and favourite of Henry VIII, who died on 22 June 1528, and in this case, Lady Carey may refer to his wife Mary Boleyn, one of the mistresses of Henry VIII and the sister of Henry's second wife, Anne Boleyn, but also to Carey’s mother, sisters and sister-in-law. Dompe, which may come from Irish dump that means lament, can refer to a dance, a dirge, a lament or a melancholic love song.

== Notable recordings ==
My Lady Carey's Dompe is in the repertoire of many artists including Igor Kipnis, Guy Bovet, Rafael Puyana, Ton Koopman, Peter Watchorn, André Isoir, Liuwe Tamminga, Paul O'Dette, David Munrow, Eduardo Paniagua, Brett Leighton, Grayston Burgess, Claudio Brizi.

Year	Album	Performer	Track #	Length	Record label
1990	Lullabies and Dances	Bill Crofut and The Crofut Consort	16	2:56	Albany Music Distribution (048)
1994	A Treasury of Harpsichord Favorites	Igor Kipnis	4	1:50	Music & Arts (CD-243)
1995	English Virginals Music	Sophie Yates	7	1:50	Chandos (CHAN0574)
1995	Flower of All Ships: Tudor Court Music	Circa 1500	12	1:51	CRD (3448)
1995	Guy Bovet à L'Orgue de la Basilique de Valère, Vol. 1	Guy Bovet	—	—	Gallo (088)
1995	The Golden Age of Harpsichord Music	Rafael Puyana	1	1:28	Mercury (434364)
1996	The Organ at Adlington Hall	Ton Koopman	1	1:47	Capriccio (255)
1997	The Mystic and the Muse	Ensemble Galilei; Nancy Karpeles (percussion); Sue Richards (Celtic harp); Erin Shrader (Fiddle, guitar); Carolyn Anderson Surrick (viol); Sarah Weiner (oboe)	—	—	Dorian (90247)
1998	Millennium of Music, Vol. 1	—	17	2:25	Valley Entertainment (VLT 0000015023)
1999	Guide des Instruments de la Renaissance	Ensemble la Fenice	—	—	Ricercar (95001)
1999	Shakespeare: The Greatest Hits	—	7 (CD 2)	4:02	Reference Recordings (3625)
1999	Vox Virginalis	Rachelle Taylor	1	2:13	ATMA Classique (22197)
2000	Alessandro Orologio: Primo Libro delle Canzonette; Intrade a Cinque Voci	Il Terzo Suono; Ensemble 1492; Dià-pasòn; Gian Paolo Fagotto (conductor, tenor)	—	—	Arts Music (47531)
2001	Court Jesters: Tudor Minstrel Music	Sirinu	3	2:20	Griffin (4013)
2001	Music of Tudor and Jacobean England	Peter Watchorn	15 (CD 1)	2:27	Musica Omnia (0104)
2001	Wondrous Machine: Early English Keyboard Music on the Organ of the Ospedaletto in Venice	Christopher Stembridge	4	1:21	Quilisma (302)
2002	Airs & Danses de la Vieille Europe	André Isoir	—	—	Disques Pierre Verany (787031)
2003	Basilicata	Liuwe Tamminga	3	1:59	Accent (21147)
2003	L'Essor de l'Orgue en Europe de la Renaissance au Baroque	Jacques Kauffmann	5	2:11	Skarbo (1004)
2003	The Classic Ocarina	Chuckerbutty Ocarina Quartet feat. Michael Copley	8	2:51	Dorian (93260)
2003	The Royal Lewters	Paul O'Dette	5	2:49	Harmonia Mundi (907313)
2004	David Munrow: Henry VIII and His Six Wives	David Munrow	18	2:00	Testament (1250)
2005	Dictionary of Medieval & Renaissance Instruments	—	7 (CD 2)	1:47	Cantus (9705)
2005	Madame d'Amours: Songs, Dances & Consort Music for the Six Wives of Henry VIII	Musica Antiqua of London	7	2:21	Signum Classics (Signum UK 044)
2005	Musica cortesana en la Europa de Juana I de Castilla	Música Antigua, Eduardo Paniagua	1	4:32	Karonte / Pneuma Classics (PN710)
2005	Musik für Orgel und Zink auf der ältesten spielbaren Orgel der Welt	Brett Leighton	25	2:10	Motette (20321)
2007	Music to Entertain Henry VIII	Grayston Burgess, Purcell Consort of Voices	17	0:55	Argo (4758582)
2008	The World's Greatest Composers [Collector's Edition Music Tin]	—	9 (CD 4)	1:09	Madacy (52955)
2010	Les Grandes Orgues de Gérardmer	Jacques Kauffmann	1	1:52	Skarbo (1095)
2011	Tears of Joy: English Lute Songs and Secular Music	Zefiro Torna	13 (CD 1)	2:14	EtCetera / Klara (KTC 4038)
2012	Renaissance & Danses Baroques	Barok Ensemble	10	1:33	Loreley (LY 049)
2013	Claviorgan Wonderland	Claudio Brizi	5	2:28	Camerata Records (CMCD 28244)
2013	Mercury Living Presence: The Collector's Edition, Vol. 2	Rafael Puyana	1 (CD 50)	1:29	Decca / Mercury (4785092)
2017	16 Century Discothèque	Olesya Rostovskaya	14	1:44	Artes Mirabiles (AM170004)
2018	An Evening Hymn	Anton Batagov	12	5:23	JSC "Firma Melodiya"

== See also ==
- 1520s in music
- Early music of the British Isles#Henry VIII and James V
- English folk music (1500–1899)
