= Ravaglia =

Ravaglia is an Italian surname. Notable people with the surname include:

- Luciano Ravaglia (1923–2017), Italian engineer
- Nicola Ravaglia (born 1988), Italian footballer
- Paolo Ravaglia (born 1959), Italian clarinetist
- Roberto Ravaglia (born 1957), Italian racing driver and team owner
