= Elisabetta Barbato =

Italian operatic soprano (1921–2014)

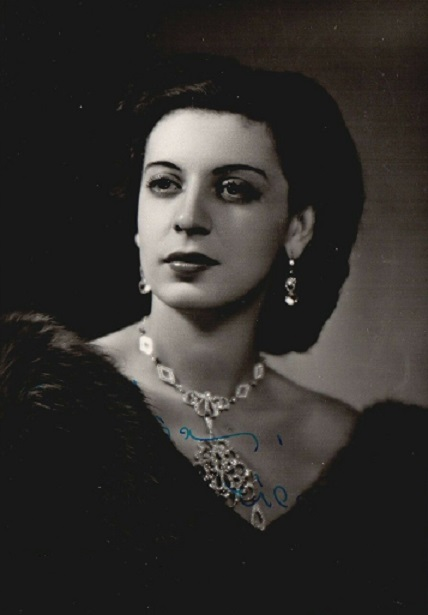
- Barbato in 1950

Background information
- Born: 11 September 1921 (age 105); Barletta, Italy
- Died: 1 February 2014 (aged 92) Rome, Italy
- Occupation: Opera singer
- Years active: 1944–1967
- Spouse: Danilo Belardinelli

Elisabetta Barbato (11 September 1921 – 1 February 2014) was an Italian operatic soprano. She had an international performance career from the 1940s through the 1960s. Considered a rival of Maria Callas, she sang at leading opera houses in Europe, South America, and the United States.

== Early life and education ==
Barbato was born on 11 September 1921, in Barletta. From 1939 to 1944, she studied at the Bologna Conservatory with Maria Aguccini. She pursued further studies at the Accademia Nazionale di Santa Cecilia in Rome; studying there with Luigi Ricci from 1944 to 1947.

== Career ==
Elisabetta Barbato as Donna Leonora in La forza del destino, Teatro alla Scala, Milan, 1946

Barbato made her opera debut at Teatro dell'Opera di Roma in 1944, singing the role of Garsenda in Zandonai's Francesca da Rimini. She performed the title role in Aida at the 1945 opera festival at the Baths of Caracalla (BC), and for her debut at La Scala in 1946. She frequently sang both Aida and the title role in Puccini's Tosca at the BC in many return engagements through 1960, and also as a guest singer at other theaters. She returned to La Scala as Maddalena di Coigny in Andrea Chénier (1946), Aida (1948), Amelia in Verdi's Un ballo in maschera (1948 & 1949), the title role in Puccini's Manon Lescaut (1949), and the title role in the world premiere of Juan José Castro's Proserpina e lo straniero (1952).

Barbato provided the sung parts for Anna Magnani's role in the film Avanti a lui tremava tutta Roma (1946). She appeared as a guest at the Teatro Comunale, Florence as Puccini's Manon Lescaut (1948), Verdi's Amelia (1951), and in the title role of La Wally (1952). She performed many roles at the Theatro Municipal in Rio de Janeiro from 1947 through 1951, and at the Teatro Colón in Buenos Aires in 1950 and 1951.

In September 1949, Barbato made her American debut at the San Francisco Opera (SFO) singing Tosca to the Mario Cavaradossi of Jussi Björling and Scarpia of Lawrence Tibbett. She soon after appeared as Aida with the SFO with Set Svanholm as her Radamès. She performed a concert with Raoul Jobin and Robert Weede under conductor Gaetano Merola on the radio program The Standard Hour in October 1949. She sang Tosca again with Björling for her debut at the Metropolitan Opera ("Met") in November 1949; this time with Alexander Sved as Scarpia. Nerves made her Met debut performance unimpressive, but she rebounded with a critically lauded portrayal of Cio-Cio-San in Madama Butterfly at the Met in December 1949 with James Melton as Pinkerton.

A rival of Maria Callas, Barbato was engaged to perform in Rio at that same time as Callas and Renata Tebaldi in the summer of 1951. According to Karl-Josef Kutsch and Leo Riemens, Barbato had a major triumph over both Callas and Tebaldi in Rio de Janeiro and both the audiences and press considered her the superior performer of the three. Callas had a vocal mishap during her performance as Puccini's Tosca and the audience reacted negatively by shouting Barbato's name. Callas's biographer, Michael Scott, notes of this event that the audience was openly hostile to Callas, and Callas heard Barbato's name yelled from the audience during the applause following her performance of the aria "Vissi d'arte". Callas was subsequently asked not to perform the remaining operas in her contract after this performance. Callas fought back, and while her remaining Tosca appearances were cancelled following the audience backlash, she was allowed to perform in La traviata.

In 1953, Barbato portrayed Polina in the first performance in Italy of Prokofiev The Gambler at the Teatro di San Carlo in Naples. She was a regular performer at this theater in the 1950s and 1960s; including portraying the title role in the 1952 world premiere of Maria Antonietta by composer Terenzio Gargiulo. In 1955, she appeared as Minnie in La fanciulla del West opposite Franco Corelli as Dick Johnson at La Fenice. In 1958, she sang Verdi's Amelia at the Gaiety Theatre, Dublin with the Dublin Grand Opera Society. In 1962, she sang Maddalena di Coigny at the Royal Opera House, Valletta, and returned to the Rome Opera as Judith in Bartók's Bluebeard's Castle. In 1964, she appeared at the Teatro Massimo in Palermo as Madame Lidoine in Poulenc's Dialogues of the Carmelites.

Other roles Barbato performed during her career included Elvira in Ernani, Giorgetta in Il tabarro, Giulietta in Riccardo Zandonai's Giulietta e Romeo, Imogene in Il pirata, Leonora in La forza del destino, Maria in Simon Boccanegra, Mariella in Il piccolo Marat, Santuzza in Cavalleria rusticana, Violetta in La traviata, and the title roles in Iris, Fedora, and Licinio Refice's Margherita di Cortona. Other theaters she sang at during her career included the Liceu, Teatro Comunale di Bologna, the Teatro Municipal of Caracas, and the Teatro Nacional de São Carlos. One of her last performances was at the Teatro Petruzzelli in 1967 as Maddalena di Coigny.

== Personal life and death ==
Barbato was married to the violinist and conductor Danilo Belardinelli. She died on 1 February 2014, in Rome. The actor Leopoldo Mastelloni was her nephew.
