= Renosto =

Renosto is an Italian surname. Notable people with the surname include:

- Giovanni Renosto (born 1960), Italian cyclist
- Mario Renosto (1929–1988), Italian footballer
- Paolo Renosto (1935–1988), Italian composer, conductor, and pianist
