= Luigi Ferdinando Tagliavini =

Italian musician (1929–2017)

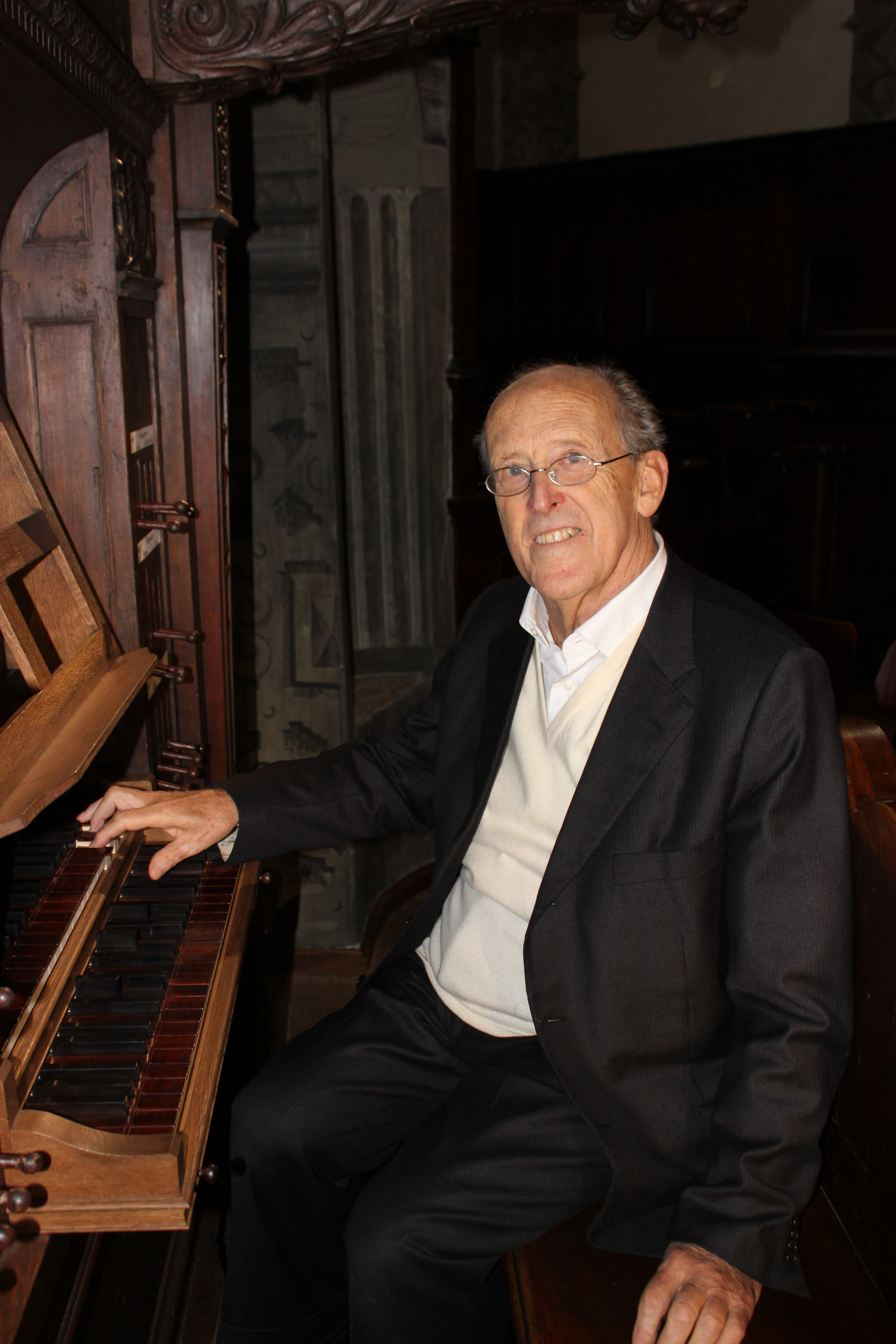
Luigi Ferdinando Tagliavini, 2012

Luigi Ferdinando Tagliavini (7 October 1929 in Bologna – 11 July 2017 in Bologna), was an Italian organist, harpsichordist, musicologist and composer.

== Biography ==
Luigi Ferdinando Tagliavini studied organ, piano and composition with Riccardo Nielsen at the Conservatorio Giovanni Battista Martini in Bologna and at the Conservatory in Paris with Marcel Dupré. He graduated at the University of Padua in 1951 with a dissertation on the texts of the sacred cantatas of Johann Sebastian Bach; he taught organ at Bologna Conservatory where he also held the post of librarian; he became lecturer and later professor of organ at the Monteverdi Conservatory in Bolzano. He was appointed to teach music history at the University of Parma and in 1971 he was appointed as Professor and as Director of the Institute of Musicology at the University of Fribourg (Switzerland). He was guest professor at various universities in the U.S.A.; he was widely active as a concert organist in Italy and abroad. Together with Liuwe Tamminga he was appointed as organist at the Basilica of San Petronio in Bologna. Together with Renato Lunelli he founded the journal "L'Organo" in 1960, continued together with Oscar Mischiati and still running today. He taught regularly at the summer courses at Haarlem, Netherlands and at the course the "Academy of Organ Music" at Pistoia.

Together with Marie-Claire Alain, Anton Heiller and Gustav Leonhardt, he made a considerable contribution to the rediscovery and promotion of historical performance practice on the Baroque organ and also the harpsichord. Together with his good friend and colleague Oscar Mischiati he is seen to have been the first promoter of the historical organ movement in Italy. This movement was and is concerned with the restoration of historical organs using old methods and techniques, reestablishing the original value of the instruments and enabling them to be appreciated. Some of the restorations guided by the movement, in particular those of the two organs in the Basilica San Petronio in Bologna, one (1471–75) by Lorenzo da Prato and (1531) Giovan Battista Fachinetti, and the other (1596) by Baldassarre Malamini, have contributed to a new awareness of historical organs in Italy and a new consciousness of their extraordinary value.

Among the most successful concert organists of his generation, he not only performed on the most important organs in Italy but also those elsewhere in Europe. He made a number of recordings and received several awards including the "Premio della discografia Italiana", the "Schallplattenpreis Phono-Akademie der Deutschen," the distinction "Choc de la musique" for the CD dedicated to Andrea Gabrieli and Giovanni Gabrieli made with Liuwe Tamminga on the organs of San Petronio and the "Premio Antonio Vivaldi" and the "Premio Massimo Mila".

Honours bestowed on him include the Tiroler Adler-Orden in Gold conferred in Innsbruck in 1982, an honorary doctorate in music from the University of Edinburgh, an honorary fellowship of the Royal College of Organists in London in 1996, an honorary degree from the University of Bologna in the disciplines of the arts, music and entertainment in 1999, and an honorary doctorate in sacred music from the Pontifical Institute of Sacred Music in Rome (2011).

During his life he assembled a unique collection of musical instruments from the sixteenth to the twentieth century. These comprise about 70 instruments, half of which are of the harpsichord family. The others not only include clavichords, pianos and organs but also wind instruments and automatic musical instruments. The collection, together with a large library, he recently donated to the Foundation of the Cassa di Risparmio in Bologna and is displayed in the buildings and Church of San Colombano, Bologna. The aims of the gift, to perpetuate, display and enlarge the collection are matched by study facilities in the library, guided tours through the collection, a continuing programme of restoration and conservation of the instruments in the workshop on the premises, conferences on related themes and concerts on the instruments. The most important instruments include a spinet of about 1540 attributed to Alesandro Trasuntino, a harpsichord by Giovanni Battista Giusti of 1679, a harpsichord by Fabio da Bologna of 1686 and a combination of a harpsichord and a piano with two keyboards, one for the hammers, the other for the plectra, by Giovanni Ferrini of 1746.

He frequently sat on juries for competitions at home and abroad, for instance in 1991 and 1994 when he was a jury member for the Internationaal Orgel Competition at the Festival of Ancient Music in Bruges.

He wrote numerous papers in the field of musicology, was a member of National Academy of Santa Cecilia and published critical editions of the works of Girolamo Frescobaldi, Domenico Zipoli and Wolfgang Amadeus Mozart.

== Discography ==
- 1991 – Andrea and Giovanni Gabrieli, Gli organi della Basilica di San Petronio, with Liuwe Tamminga (Tactus)
- 1991 – Maestri Padani e Fiamminghi. Gli organi storici della Basilica di San Petronio in Bologna, with Liuwe Tamminga (Tactus)
- 1993 – Giuseppe Gherardeschi, Messa per organo, with the Corale S. Michele Arcangelo di Corsanico (Fonè)
- 1996 – Luigi Ferdinando Tagliavini and his collection of harpsichords (Ermitage)
- 2004 – L'organo Gaetano Callido (La Bottega Discantica)

== Compositions ==
Passacaglia su un tema di Hindemith (1953)

== Publications ==
- Studi sui testi delle cantate sacre di J. S. Bach, Padua-Kassel, 1956
- La situazione degli antichi organi in Italia: problemi di censimento e di tutela, together with Oscar Mischiati (in "L'organo" 1969)
- Note introduttive alla storia del temperamento in Italia (in "L'organo" 1980)
- J. S. Bach Musik in Italien im 18. und 19. Jahrhundert (in AA.VV., Bachiana et alia musicologica: Festschrift A. Dürr, Kassel, 1983)
- Giovanni Ferrini e il suo cembalo (in Thomas Steiner, ed., Instruments à claviers – expressivité et flexibilité; actes des rencontres internationales harmoniques, Lausanne, 2002, 13–32)
- Collezione Tagliavini, catalogo degli strumenti musicale, 2 vols., Bologna 2008, together with John Henry van der Meer

== Bibliography ==
- Luigi Ferdinando Tagliavini in "Dizionario Enciclopedico Universale della Musica e dei Musicisti", Turin 1988
- E. Darbellay, Luigi Ferdinando Tagliavini in "The New Grove's Dictionary of Music and Musicians", London 1980
- D. Morgante, Luigi Ferdinando Tagliavini e l'Early Music Revival: dalla Musicologia alla Poetica della Musica, Commemorazione di Luigi Ferdinando Tagliavini nel Primo Anniversario della Morte, Pieve di Cadore (8 luglio 2018), Monopoli, Istituto Mediterraneo di Musicologia, 2019.
- biografia dettagliata e bibliografia di Luigi Ferdinando Tagliavini
