= Bologna Conservatory =

College of music in Bologna, Italy

Conservatorio Giovanni Battista Martini
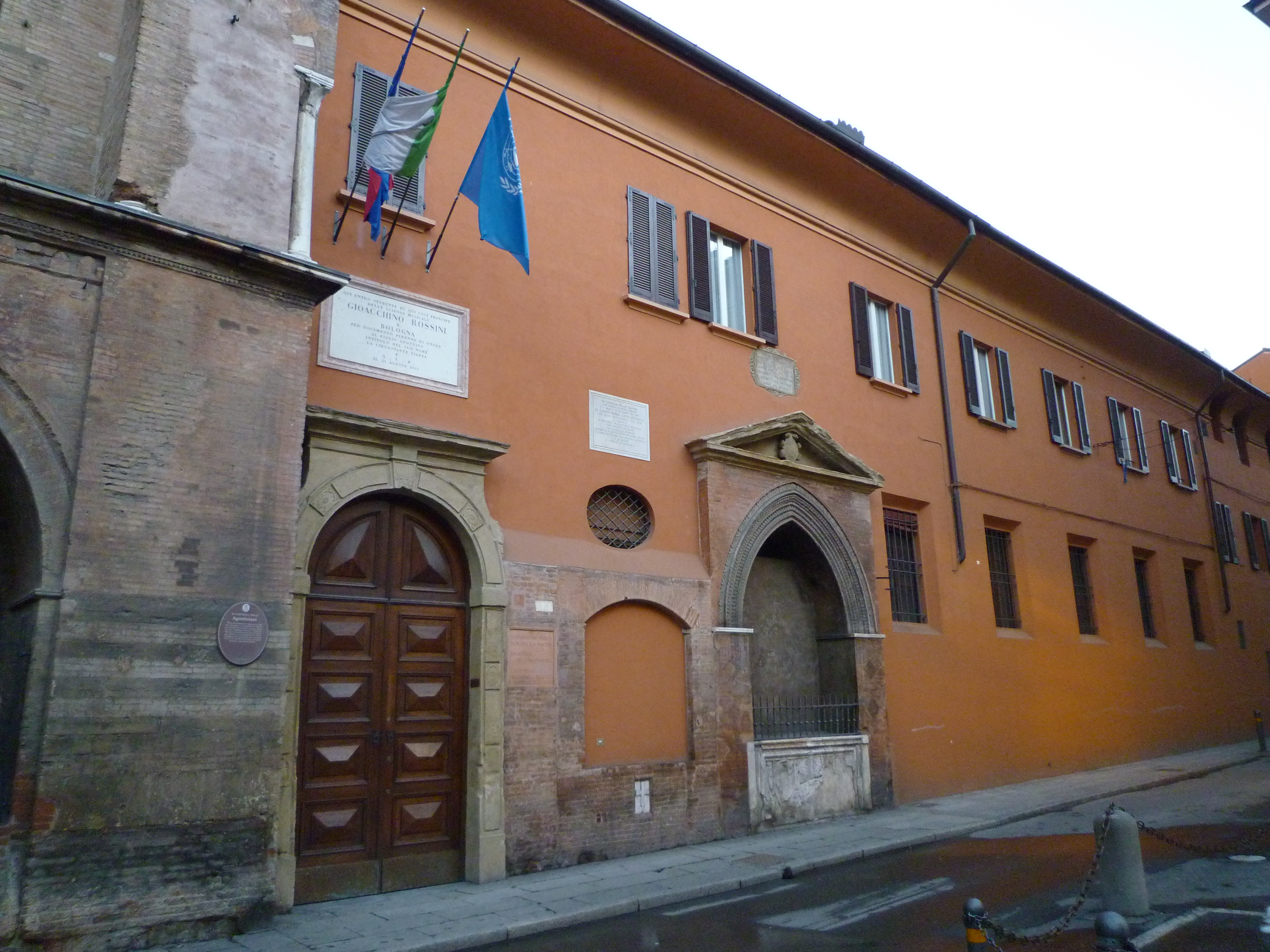
- Former name: Liceo Musicale di Bologna
- Established: 1804; 222 years ago
- Location: Piazza Rossini, Bologna, Italy; 44°29′43.4″N 11°20′57.1″E
- Website: consbo.it

The Conservatorio Giovanni Battista Martini (previously known as the Liceo Musicale di Bologna, and better known in English as the Bologna Conservatory) is a college of music in Bologna, Italy. The conservatory opened on 3 December 1804, as the Liceo Musicale di Bologna. It was initially housed in the convent at the Basilica of San Giacomo Maggiore. The first faculty at the school included the composers Stanislao Mattei and Giovanni Callisto Zanotti, and the composer and singer Lorenzo Gibelli. Gioachino Rossini was a pupil at the school beginning in 1806, and was appointed head of the school in 1839. Later directors of the school included Luigi Mancinelli (1881–1886), Giuseppe Martucci (1886–1902), Marco Enrico Bossi (1902–1911), and Cesare Nordio (1925–1945).

In 1945, the conservatory became a state conservatory, and it was rebranded as the Conservatorio Giovanni Battista Martini, after musician and composer Giovanni Battista Martini. Directors of the conservatory from this point on include Guido Guerrini, Lino Liviabella, Adone Zecchi, Giordano Noferini, Lidia Proietti, Carmine Carrisi, and Donatella Pieri.

== Notable alumni ==
- Marietta Alboni
- Elisabetta Barbato
- Alice Barbi
- Gianni Bedori
- Chiara Benati
- Giacomo Benvenuti
- Marco Enrico Bossi
- Claudio Brizi
- Piero Buscaroli
- Luciano Chessa
- Giuliano Ciannella
- Ettore Campogalliani
- Giulio Confalonieri
- Franco Donatoni
- Gaetano Donizetti
- Enrico Elisi
- Mafalda Favero
- Franco Ferrara
- Rodolfo Ferrari
- Carlo Forlivesi
- Gaetano Gaspari
- Giorgio Federico Ghedini
- Júlíus Vífill Ingvarsson
- Gian Francesco Malipiero
- Gianfranco Masini
- Giacomo Orefice
- Luigi Piazza
- Ciro Pinsuti
- Ezio Pinza
- Claudia Pinza Bozzolla
- Manuel Ponce
- Ottorino Respighi
- Andrea Roncato
- Gioachino Rossini
- Albert Spalding
- Enea Scala
- Riccardo Stracciari
- Giovanni Tadolini
- Luigi Ferdinando Tagliavini
- Fabio Vacchi
- Celso Valli
- Franco Venturini
- Manuel Viscasillas Bernal
- Corrado Zambelli
- Fio Zanotti

== Notable faculty ==
- Marcello Abbado
- Cesare Augusto
- Nazario Carlo Bellandi
- Alessandro Busi
- Ettore Desderi
- Benedetto Donelli
- Ines Maria Ferraris
- Gian Felice Fugazza
- Gaetano Gaspari
- Stefano Golinelli
- Adriano Guarnieri
- Leone Magiera
- Luigi Mancinelli
- Giacomo Manzoni
- Giuseppe Martucci
- Antonio Melandri
- Luigi Mostacci
- Riccardo Nielsen
- Umberto Pineschi
- Paolo Ravaglia
- Paolo Renosto
- Gioachino Rossini
- Alessandro Solbiati
- Luigi Torchi
- Alessandro Vezzani
- Carlo Zangarini

== See also ==
- Accademia Filarmonica di Bologna
- Museo internazionale e biblioteca della musica

== Sources ==
- Allitt, John Stewart (1991), Donizetti – in the light of romanticism and the teaching of Johann Simon Mayr, Shaftesbury, Dorset, UK: Element Books. Also see Allitt's website
