= Ingvarsson =

Ingvarsson is a surname. Notable people with the surname include:

- Ingvi Sigurður Ingvarsson (1924–2009), Icelandic diplomat
- Jón Arnar Ingvarsson (born 1972), Icelandic basketball player
- Júlíus Vífill Ingvarsson, Icelandic politician
- Martin Ingvarsson (born 1965), Swedish football referee
- Niklas Ingvarsson (born 1978), Swedish ice sledge hockey player
- Ragnvald Ingvarsson, Captain of the Varangian Guard
- Stefan Ingvarsson (1946–2017), Swedish racewalker
- Sveinn Ingvarsson (1914–2009), Icelandic sprinter
