= Flavio Emilio Scogna =

Italian composer (born 1956)

- Scogna in 2015

Background information
- Born: 16 August 1956 (age 69); Savona, Italy
- Occupations: Composer, conductor

Flavio Emilio Scogna (born 16 August 1956 in Savona, Liguria) is an Italian composer and conductor.

== Biography ==
After studying at the Conservatory of Genoa, Scogna subsequently went on to further his studies in composition and conducting, amongst others, with Franco Ferrara in Rome (1982–1983), with Franco Donatoni and Aldo Clementi at the University of Bologna. In 1984 he went on to specialize with Luciano Berio with whom he was to strike up a strong relationship based on friendship and professional respect. This was to have a decisive effect on his development as a conductor. In 1988, along with Berio, he carried out the transcription and elaboration of Wir bauen eine Stadt by Paul Hindemith, which was performed in the same year in the Konzerthaus in Wien. Scogna's works are performed in the most prestigious places (Accademia Nazionale di S.Cecilia, Teatro Comunale di Firenze, Centre Pompidou in Paris, Konzerthaus in Vienna, Auditorium Nacional in Madrid, Teatro dell’Opera di Roma) and they are recorded on RCA, BMG Ariola as well as broadcast by the major European radios and televisions (RAI, BBC, RNE, BRT, Radio France amongst others).

In 1998 he represented the RAI television network at the Prix Italia, with the radio work "L’Arpa Magica" based on a text by Edoardo Sanguineti. He has given lectures and seminars regarding his own compositions, in Europe and at several colleges in the United States. In October 2002 Flavio Emilio Scogna successfully conducted "La memoria perduta" (directed by Pier-Alli), a work commissioned by the Rome Opera House. Besides being a composer, since 1990 he has been an international acclaimed Orchestra Conductor both in the classical and operatic repertoire (he has revalued important classics and has often edited them personally, such as Pergolesi, Boccherini and Rossini), in the twentieth century and contemporary repertoire with a very large number of premieres (he is now considered one of the most popular conductors among the major living composers), such as Aldo Clementi, Sylvano Bussotti, Luis de Pablo, Ennio Morricone, Giacomo Manzoni, Adriano Guarnieri and in the historic twentieth century (Erik Satie and Nino Rota, for whom he pressed the first global record of the work "I due timidi"). He directed some of the most important international symphonic orchestras such as the Kiev Philharmonic Orchestra, the Rai Symphonic Orchestra, the RTVE Symphony Orchestra, the Rome Opera House Orchestra, the Hungarian State Symphonic Orchestra, the Raanana Sinfonietta of Israel, the Icelandic Symphonic Orchestra, the Orchestre Philharmonique de Nice, the Orchestre Symphonique et Lyrique de Nancy, the Pomeriggi Musicali di Milano Orchestra, the Sicilian Symphonic Orchestra, the Filarmonica Toscanini Orchestra and the National Academy Orchestra of Santa Cecilia, as well as internationally acclaimed ensembles such as Alternance in Paris, The Accademia Bizantina, Circulo in Madrid and the Ensemble Strumentale Scaligero.

In 1995 he directed the opening concert for the celebration of the centenary of the International Music Festival of the Biennale di Venezia with "Quare Tristis" of Adriano Guarnieri. From 1999 he conducts the Cantelli Orchestra and the Symphonic Orchestra of Italy in Milan for the concerts of the music "NovecentoMusica" Festival with Luigi Pestalozza as artistic director. Flavio Emilio Scogna's discography is very rich and comprises recordings for RCABMG (RCA Red Seal), Brilliant Classic, Curci, RicordiMediastore, FonitCetra, Dynamic, Tactus and Bongiovanni. His CD recording of Schnittke's works (Dynamic S 2030) gained the highest rating (10) given by the magazine Répertoire in the year 2000. From 2006 to 2009 he was the conductor of the Ensemble Contemporaneo of the National Academy of Santa Cecilia and in 2009 he became Principal Conductor of the Bari Symphony Orchestra.

== Awards ==
- Premio Vittorio De Sica 2013 for Classical Music

== Works and editions ==
- Toccata per chitarra (1980)
- Contrasti per flauto e pianoforte (1980)
- Interludi dialoganti per due chitarre (1981)
- Planc per flauto/ottavino, corno inglese, chitarra, glockenspiel, vibrafono, harmonium e clavicembalo (1982)
- Due studi per chitarra (1982)
- Mosaico per quintetto di fiati (1982)
- Epigrammi per flauto in sol, oboe d’amore, tromba, violino e contrabbasso (1982)
- Musica per tre per oboe, clarinetto e fagotto (1982)
- I profumi della notte per flauto/ottavino, chitarra, pianoforte e percussione (1983)
- Cadenza per pianoforte a 4 mani (1983)
- In divenire per clarinetti in sib e clarinetto basso (un solo esecutore) (1983)
- Canto primo per soprano e pianoforte (1983)
- Canto secondo per mezzosoprano e pianoforte (1983)
- Canto terzo per baritono e pianoforte (1983)
- Come in un rondò per flauto, vibrafono e arpa (1983)
- Quadri per orchestra (1983, rev.1990)
- Arioso per Guillermo per chitarra (1984)
- Incanto per due violini e viola (1985)
- Come un’onda di luce per oboe, clarinetto, violino, viola e violoncello (1985)
- Cadenza seconda per pianoforte (1986)
- Sinfonia concertante per orchestra (1987)
- Frammento per soprano e pianoforte (1987)
- Concertino per gruppo strumentale (19871997)
- Wir bauen eine stadt per coro di bambini e gruppo strumentale (1987)
- La mar per marimba (1987) 6’
- Tre invenzioni per pianoforte (1987)
- Serenata per gruppo strumentale (1984–88)
- Anton, azione musicale (1984–88) (testi a cura di Claudio Casini e F.E.Scogna)
- Risonanze per quartetto d'archi (1988)
- Fluxus per orchestra (1988–1995)
- Verso per flauto, oboe, clarinetto, violino, viola e violoncello
- Alternanze per pianoforte e orchestra da camera. (1988–1995) 1
- Rifrazioni per soprano e orchestra (1989) (su testo di Bruno Cagli)
- Capriccio per violoncello (1990)
- Rondò per clarinetto in Sib (1990)
- Duplum per sax contralto in Mib (1990)
- Prisma per quartetto di sassofoni (1990)
- Duplex per quartetto di clarinetti (1990)
- Musica reservata per orchestra d’archi (1990)
- Linee di forza per violino (1990)
- Festa per orchestra da camera (1991)
- Salmo XII per due voci e Orchestra (1991)
- Relazioni per violoncello, oboe, clarinetto, violino, viola e live electronics (1991)
- Diaphonia per viola, pianoforte e orchestra d’archi (1991)
- La memoria perduta Opera in due atti (1991/1993) su libretto di Gina Lagorio
- Trameper tromba in Do (1993)
- Cabaletta per 11 archi (1993)
- Inno per tromba e organo (1993)
- Tre partite sopra l’aria di Fiorenza (da Frescobaldi) per orchestra (1994)
- Aulos per oboe (1994)
- Concentus per Orchestra (1994–1995)
- Postilla per soprano e strumenti (1996)
- Memorie per voce recitante, violino e midi (1996)
- Notturno Italiano per gruppo da camera (1997)
- Amadeus, mio caro… per orchestra da camera (1988)
- L’arpa magica per soprano, voce recitante, violino e arpa (1998)
- Discanto per violino e orchestra (2001)
- Flos per trio d’archi (2002)
- Ison per flauto, violino e pianoforte (2003)
- Color per viola sola (2005)
- Flatlandia per voce recitante e ensemble (2009)
- La realtà, melologo per voce recitante e ensemble (2011) su testi di Pierpaolo Pasolini

Revisioni: G. PETRASSI, Grand septuor Suvini-Zerboni S.8503 Z.(2008)

- Edizioni Ricordi, Milano
- Edizioni Suvini-Zerboni, Milano
- Edizioni Sonzogno, Milano
- Edizioni Curci, Milano

== Discography ==
- Scogna, Segnali per sei dimensioni – Scogna/Orchestra Sinfonica della Rai – RCA Sp10088 1982
- Scogna, Incanto – Scogna/Romensemble, RCA Red Seal RL71140 1986
- Scogna, cd monografico- Scogna/Symphonia Perusina/Gruppo Musica d’Oggi – RCA CCD3004 1992
- Morricone, Betta, De Rossi Re, Lauricella – Scogna/OSA – RCA CCD30046
- Pennisi, Achantis – Scogna/Romensemble – RCA RL71138 1986
- Respighi, Suite della tabacchiera – Scogna/Romamusica ensemble – Fonotipia SP109101 1991
- Schnittke, Concerto grosso – Scogna/Ensemble Terzo suono – Dynamic S2030 2000
- Rota, I due timidi/La notte di un nevrastenico – Orch. Filarmonia Veneta Malipiero – Bongiovanni GB2367 2004
- Pergolesi, Stabat Mater – Scogna/Rubortone/Onorati/Orchestra Benedetto Marcello – Tactus TC711603 2006
- Gorecki, Sinfonia n 3 – Scogna/Caiello/Amadeus Orchestra- Curci 010 2005
- Amato, Il principe felice – Scogna/Lavia/Ensemble Strumentale Scaligero – Curci 011 2006
- Boccherini, Stabat Mater – Scogna/Vignudelli/Orchestra Benedetto Marcello – Tactus TC711642 2006
- Rossini, Petite Messe Solennelle -Scogna, Calandra, Onorati, DiFilippo, Battagion, Carbonara, Polimanti, Pavoni/Coro G. Petrassi-Tactus TC791803 2007
- Carrara, Destinazione del sangue- Scogna, Rondoni, Iannone, Fiorino/Nuova Orchestra Scarlatti -Stradivarius str 33841 2009
- Vivaldi, In turbato mare irato – Scogna, Divito/Orchestra Benedetto Marcello- Tactus TC 670002 2011
- Frisina, Passio Caecilae – Scogna, Vignudelli, Sebasti/Nova Amadeus -Brilliant Classics 9405 2013
- De Sica, A life in music – Scogna/Filarmonica Toscanini – Brilliant Classics 94905 2014
- Pergolesi, La Serva padrona – Scogna, Nisi, Benetti/Solisti Liriensi -Tactus Tc711606 2014
- Carrara, Magnificat – Scogna, Guaitoli/Orchestre Symphonique et Lyrique de Nancy – Brilliant 95213 2015
- Bartok, Ghedini, Rota, Hindemith – Scogna/I Solisti Aquilani – Brilliant Classics 95223 2015
- Pergolesi/Tarabella – La serva padrona, Il servo padrone – Scogna, Liuzzi, Di Gioia, Pecchioli Orchestra V. Galilei – Brilliant Classics 95360 2018
- Menotti, The Telephone, The Medium – Scogna, Hetrzberg, Grante, Samsonova-Khayet/Orchestra Filarmonica Italiana – Brilliant Classics 95361 2018

== Sources ==
- D.E.U.M.M., Dizionario Enciclopedico Universale della Musica e dei Musicisti (le biografie), vol. VII, p. 202. UTET, Torino 1988.
- EMG, Enciclopedia della Musica, Garzanti, p. 807. Milano 1996
- Von der Weid J.N., Music in XX the Century, Memories, Milano 2002
- R.Cresti, Musica presente, tendenze e compositori di oggi", LIM, Lucca 2019
- R. Cresti, Per una nuova storia della musica, vol.II p. 612, Napoli, 1987.
- R. Badalì, Dizionario della musica italiana, Roma, 1996.
- G. Zaccaro, La musica nel Novecento, Roma, 1986
- IBC, International who's who in music, p. 771, IBC Cambridge 1990
