= Adriano Guarnieri (composer) =

Italian composer (born 1947)

Adriano Guarnieri (born 10 September 1947, in Sustinente, Italy) is an Italian composer of contemporary classical music.

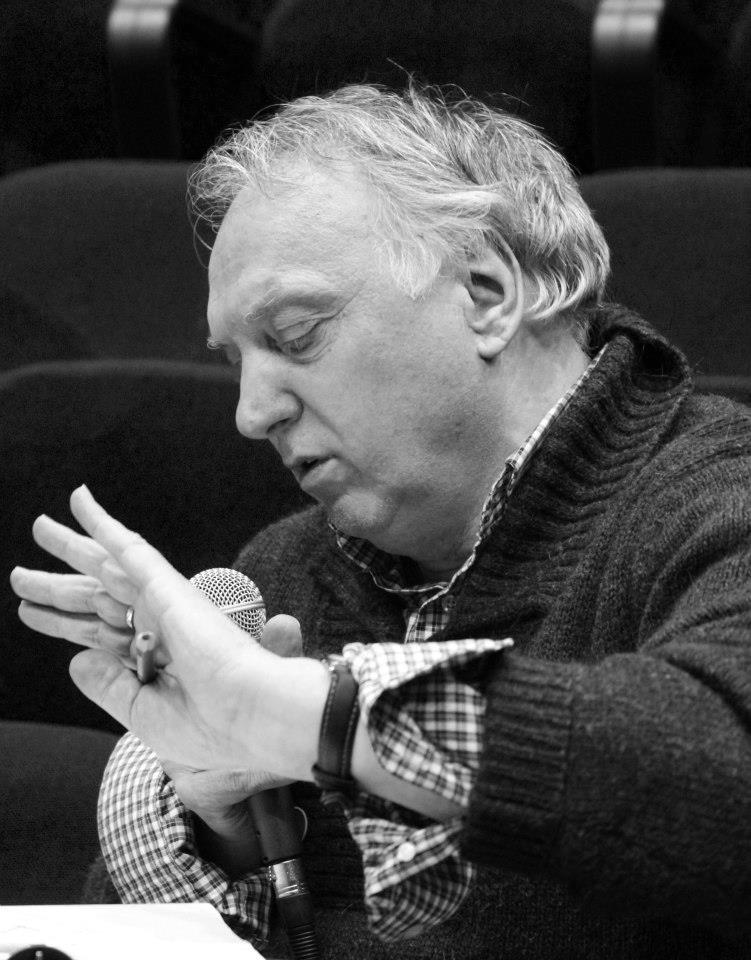
Adriano Guarnieri

== Biography ==
Guarnieri studied at the Conservatory in Bologna, where he got his diploma in musical composition with Giacomo Manzoni and another diploma in choral music with Tito Gotti. He started his activity as a conductor as well, founding the Nuovo Ensemble Bruno Maderna in Florence.

He taught musical composition at the Milan Conservatory, Florence, Pesaro Conservatory and Bologna Conservatory.

In his earliest works, from Musica per un’azione immaginaria to L’art pour l’art?, he tries to incorporate graphical elements into the music, and in so doing, he clearly shows his structuralist approach, which only later becomes more informal. Nafshi, Recit and other compositions show a turning point in his way of composing, since he pays more attention to the form, which is thought of as a synthesis of a fluid episodic multiplicity. Through his Pierrot series, he was able to reveal a "melodic" component of his music, which broadens in the opera Trionfo della notte (1986–87 season at the Teatro Comunale di Bologna), which won the Premio Abbiati as the best composition of the year.

Among his later works are Romanza alla notte No. 2, for violin and orchestra (Parma, June 20, 1991), proof of the deep relationship existing between the composer and Pier Paolo Pasolini's poetics.

He dedicated to Pasolini Il glicine, for soprano, reciting voice, amplified flute and violin (Milan, July 2, 1993). In Orfeo cantando... tolse..., ten lyric actions based on text freely taken by Poliziano’s Orfeo (1994), the beauty and the musicality of Poliziano’s verses, their expressive strength and their sound, the lyric aura surrounding their words, determine the musical form, and an idea of dramaturgy which is totally internal to the music and to the spatiality it created.

His collaboration with Giovanni Raboni led to the creation of Quare tristis, for soloists, chorus, two instrumental groups, two tubas and live electronics (Biennale di Venezia, 1995). In 1999, in Strasbourg, the premiere of Pensieri canuti, cantata for soloists, chorus, two ensembles in double chorus and live electronics, again based on a text by Raboni; on April 6, 2000, at the Basilica di S.Marco in Milan, Passione secondo Matteo, linked to Pasolini's film.

On 20 October 2002, in Venice, the opera-video Medea, for soloists, chorus and orchestra, was premiered.

In 2003 Medea was awarded the prestigious Premio Abbiati by the Italian musical critic in the section dedicated to novelties.

In February 2004 in Turin La terra del tramonto was performed by the Orchestra Nazionale della RAI.

The opera Pietra di Diaspro was premiered in 2007 for the Teatro dell'Opera di Roma and Ravenna Festival.

In 2013, he started a collaboration with Tempo Reale, the centre for music research devoted to music technology based in Florence. With the musicians and technicians of the centre, Guarneri has realized three musical works with an intense use of live electronics, premiered and performed in Florence, Ravenna, Torino, and Spoleto.

== Works ==
- Excerpts for 11 strings (1974-1977)
- Nafshi for flute solo with tape ad libitum (1975)
- Musica per un’azione immaginaria for string quintet and tape ad libitum (1976)
- L’art pour l’art? for string quartet, tape and 8 instruments (1976)
- Mystere for 7 instruments (1978)
- Abschied for flute and harp (1978)
- Air (Trio No. 2) for 2 violins and viola (1978)
- Recit (Trio No. 1) for piano, viola and cello (1978)
- Alia for orchestra (1978)
- Poesia in forma di rosa for 13 instruments (1979)
- Insonora for viola (1979)
- Arco for violin solo (1979)
- Pierrot Suite for 3 chamber groups (1980)
- Pierrot Pierrot! for flutes, celesta and percussion (1980)
- Arioso cantabile for flute, clarinet, piano and percussion (2 performers) (1982)
- Le notti mie son roche di grida for flute and harp (also harpsichord or vibraphone or celesta ad lib.) (1982)
- ...di sussulti e di tremori for piano and orchestra (1982)
- Ein Lied an Gott for soprano, bass flute (also piccolo), 2 organs, percussion and chamber music group (1982)
- ...di un pastore errante for small chamber music group (8 performers) (1983)
- Romanze zur Nacht (Romanza alla notte n. 1) for cello and 11 performers (1983)
- Pierrot Suite II for concertante flute and 16 players (1984)
- E... le ombre fuggano... for 2 flutes (1984)
- Sospeso d’incanto for piano (1984)
- Concerto for violin and orchestra (1985)
- Trionfo della notte. Preludio atto I, for 19 performers with percussion concerto (1985)
- “...il tubare della tortora... non odi?...” for soprano (offstage), perussion, concertante, orchestra (1985)
- Trionfo della notte. Lyrical action on text by Pier Paolo Pasolini (1985)
- Passioni perse for flute and piano (1986)
- Disteso for 8 instruments (1986)
- Sospeso (Trio No. 3) for flute, violin and piano (1987)
- Parafrasi: 4 th scene from " Trionfo della notte" for 2 sopranos, tenor, flute, piano (celesta), percussion, cello (1987)
- “...d’incanto!” for piano and tape "circular loop" (1988)
- “...dal nulla... al nulla...” (Trio n. 4) for bass clarinet and 2 percussion (1988)
- “Velato... del nuovo mistero” for piano and 4 instrumental groups with magnetic tape (1988)
- Romanza alla notte n. 2 (Concerto II) for violin and orchestra (1988)
- Piccola anima for narrator, soprano, and 7 players (1988)
- “sull’isola della libertà...” for 2 sopranos and 12 instruments (1989)
- Piccola anima. II versione for flute, piano and soprano (1989)
- “Oltre l’anima tua...” (homage to Mozart) for orchestra (1989)
- “perdo il futuro della tua grazia” for soprano, narrator (on tape), flute, violin, percussion (1989-1990)
- "Per Armando" for solo guitar (1990)
- Giustizia cara... for 3 sopranos, narrator and orchestra on texts by Pier Paolo Pasolini (1990)
- “...e per lunghi filamenti...” for soprano, piano concertante and 13 instruments (1991)
- Medea (1991), opera film, for soli, chorus and orchestra (premiere: 2002)
- “Elision” for 12 instruments (9 players) "Homage to Charles Ives" (1992)
- Mit Dämpfer for solo trumpet in C and B flat (1992)
- Preludio alla notte for solo flute (1992)
- “infinite Risonanze... inquiete..." for amplified guitar, tape and live electronics (1992)
- Trio No. 6 (Homage to Camillo Togni in 70 th birthday) for flute, violin and percussion (1992)
- Il glicine for soprano, voice narrator, flute and violin (all amplified) (1993)
- “per il sole... per il cielo... per il mare” loosely based on Medea, for 2 sopranos and string quartet (1993)
- Orfeo cantando... tolse... 10 lyrical actions loosely based on text from ' Orpheus of Poliziano (1994)
- Medea Suite. 6 Songs from Medea opera film for soft voice and amplified soprano and orchestra (1995)
- Quare tristis for soloists, female choir, 2 instrumental groups, 2 tubes, electronic spatialization (1995)
- Resistenza 1995 for amplified female voice (1995)
- “Grido ai miei occhi, Sarajevo...” for amplified piano and two pianos on tape (1995)
- Il pianto della scavatrice for amplified female voice, flute, bass clarinet, violin and cello (1996)
- Omaggio a Mina 6 songs for light voice, soprano and orchestra (1996)
- A Giacomo Manzoni o delle dissolvenze sonore for alto flute and soprano (amplified) (1997)
- Blandine Ballata for piano and spoken voices (1997)
- “... Uno spazio che tremola celeste...” for string quartet (1997)
- Traviata. Preludio Atto III for quartet and string orchestra (transcription) (1997)
- Pensieri canuti for soloists, chorus, two ensembles on double choir and live electronics (1998)
- “...canto un ricordo...” two songs for light solo voice amplified (1998)
- Da questi occhi... for female amplified voice and ensemble (1998)
- Duo Concertante for solo flute and violin and ensemble (1998)
- Passione Secondo Matteo, Cantata for soloists, choir and ensemble (1999)
- B.A.C.H. (the 250th) for amplified flute (2000)
- Medea opera video for soloists, soft voice, choir, orchestra, instrumental solos and live electronics (2000)
- Dedica. Praeludium Es moll for violin, flute, harpsichord or piano and cello (2000)
- In Badia fiesolana 1980 n. 2, for chamber orchestra (2002)
- Sospeso d’incanto N. 1 (with live electronics), for piano and live electronics (2002)
- Grido ai miei occhi Sarajevo, for ensemble with piano, concertante guitar and electric bass (2002)
- Epifania dell’eterno, for solo violin (2002)
- Suono a cielo aperto, for soprano and strings (2002)
- In Badia fiesolana 1980 n. 1, for ensemble (2002)
- La terra del tramonto Live-Symphony n. 1, for large orchestra and live electronics (2003)
- Salmo n. 50, for voices and orchestra (2003)
- Stagioni, Dura stagione, dal sole accesa... for flute, violin and strings (2003)
- Sospeso d’incanto N. 2, for piano (2003)
- La città capovolta, for amplified guitar and recitation voice (2003)
- Sull’onda notturna del mare infinito, to Roberto Fabbriciani for bass flute and live electronics (2003)
- Solo di donna lyrical action for flute, harp, female vocals, voices on tape and live electronics (2004)
- La terra del tramonto - Short Symphony, for orchestra (2004)
- Se questo è un uomo, on a text by Serena Brioschi, for solo recitation voice and strings (2004)
- ...del mare infinito for bass flute (2004)
- I fili luccicano, cadenza for solo violin (2005)
- La memoria del futuro, for narrator, soprano and ensemble (2005)
- Pietra di diaspro, for 7 soloists, choir, instrumental solos, orchestra and live electronics (2005)
- Kammersymphonie n. 3 for 4 saxophones and chamber orchestra (2005)
- Ostinato n. 2 for bass flute and videoclip (2005)
- Opus 1 for solo guitar (2005)
- Fili bianco-velati for solo violin (2005)
- Opus 2 for tenor saxophone solo (2006)
- Opus 3 for four saxophones (2006)
- Omaggio a Raboni for solo flute (2006)
- Live-Symphony No 4 for orchestra (2006)
- Sopra un alto monte, for vocal ensemble and two instruments (2009)
- Processo a Costanza, chamber opera for voices and instruments (2009)
- Tenebrae Opera video for soli on tape, soli in theatre, three vocal soloists, instrumental ensemble and live electronics, on texts by Massimo Cacciari - Martin Heidegger, Georg Trakl (2010)
