= Ciro Pinsuti =

Italian composer (1829–1888)

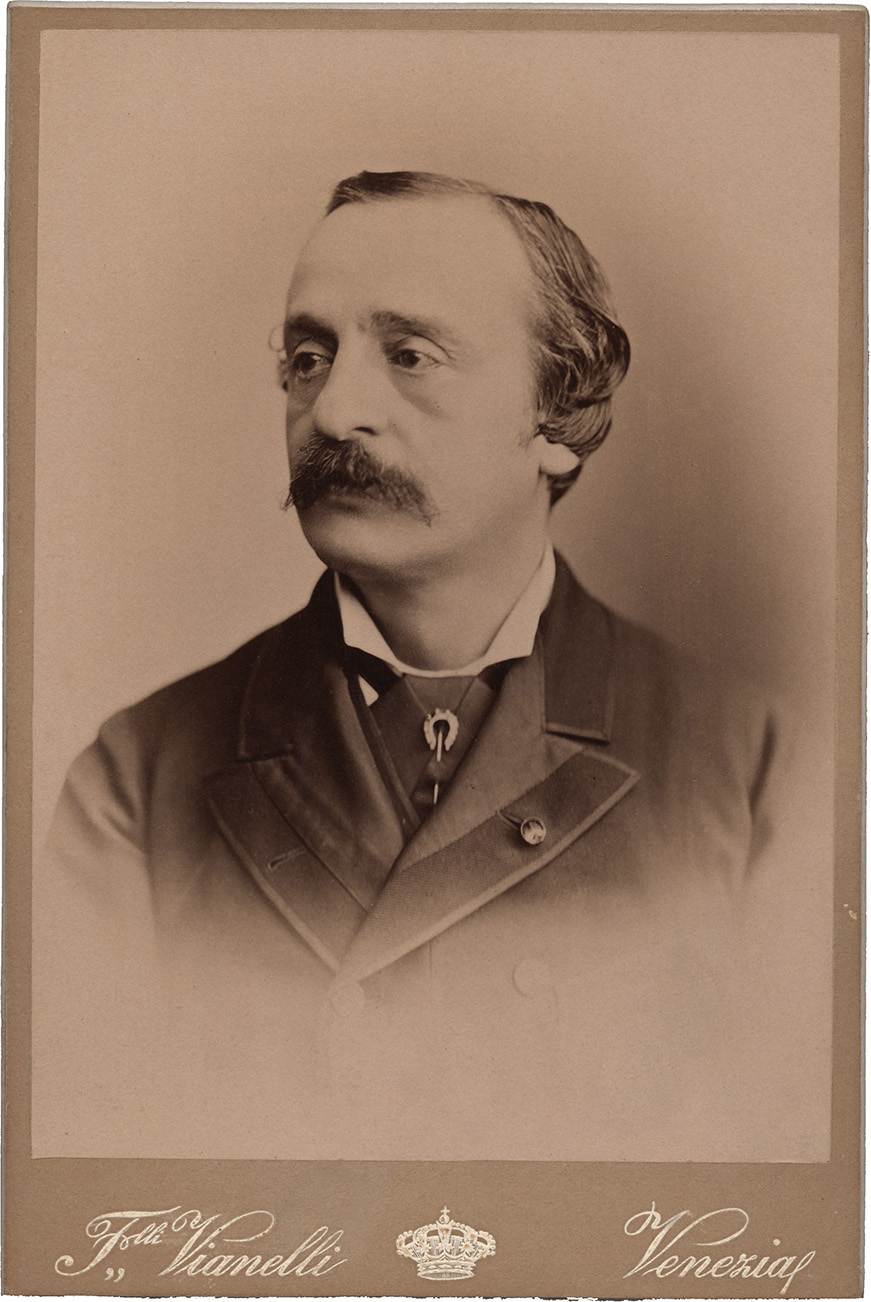
Ciro Pinsuti.

Ciro Pinsuti (9 May 1829 – 10 March 1888) was an Anglo-Italian composer. Educated in music for a career as a pianist, he studied composition under Rossini. From 1848 he made his home in England, where he became a teacher of singing, and in 1856 he was made a professor at the Academy of Music in London.

Pinsuti composed numerous songs and part-songs which achieved popularity in the Victorian era. He also composed three operas, which were produced in Italy, but which are rarely performed today. He is most remembered for his popular parlour songs such as "I Fear no Foe" and the "Bedouin love song".

== Life ==
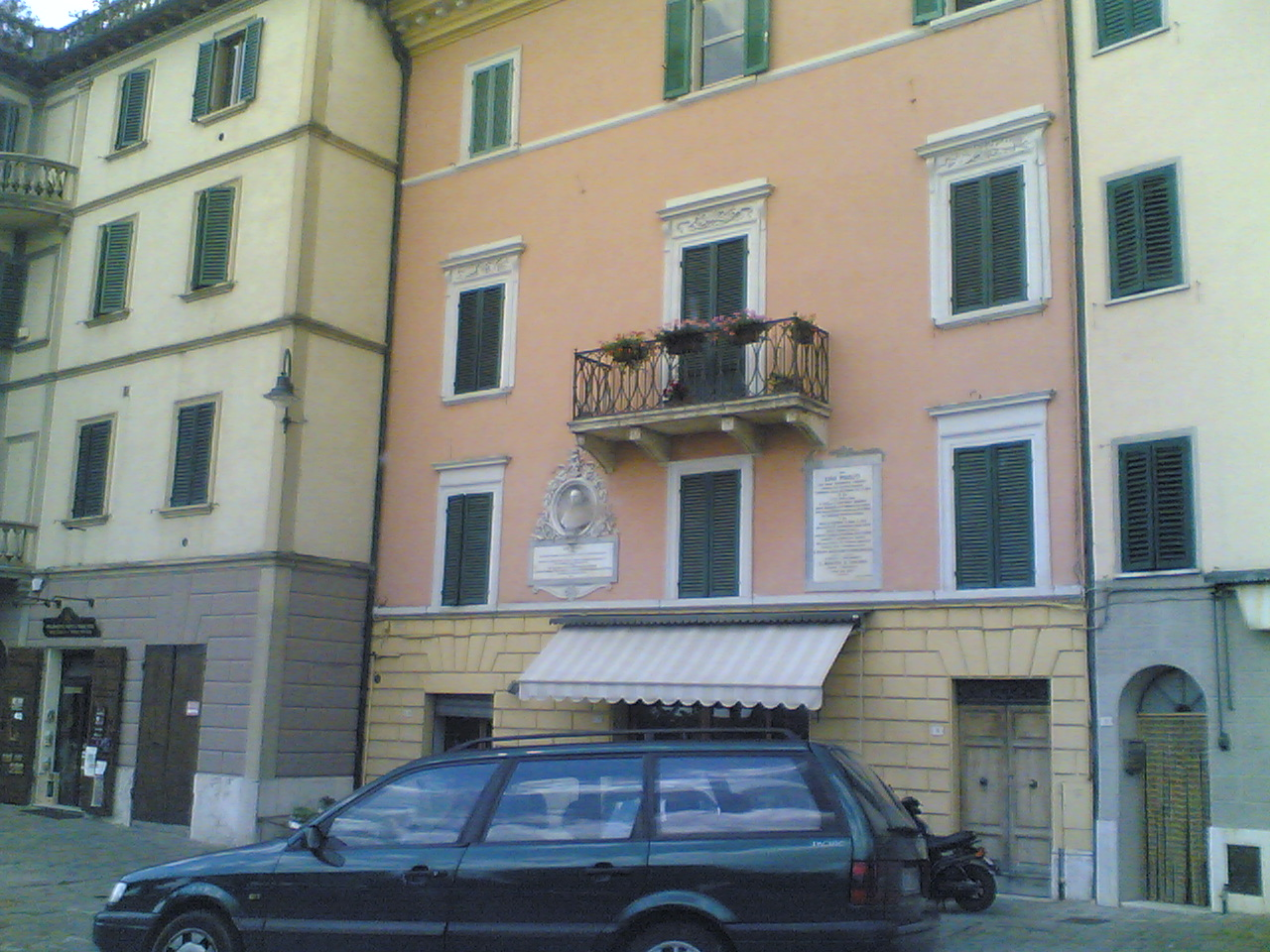
Pinsuti's birthplace in Sinalunga

He was born in Sinalunga near Siena, Italy, the son of Maddalena Formichi and G. Battista Pinsuti, who was the music teacher of the local orchestra. After studying music with a friend of his father, he made his first public appearance on 7 March 1840 at the age of ten in the Civic Theatre of Perugia playing the violin in the orchestra. After the season, his father took him to Rome, where he played for several important Roman families, and gaining access to the Accademia di Santa Cecilia.

British MP Henry Drummond saw Ciro performing and proposed to his father that he would pay for Ciro's tuition at the conservatory of Naples, provided that Ciro came to London to perform. Pinsuti remained in London for five years, after which he chose to study with Gioachino Rossini at the Bologna Conservatory. Rossini, who befriended Pinsuti, advised him to return to London after finishing his studies, as Britain represented the best prospects for his future career.

Having returned to London, Pinsuti gave music lessons during the day, while performing his own compositions at evening soirees. The Royal Academy of Music in London appointed him as a singing teacher. He was also given posts in Italy, becoming an honorary member of the Accademia di Santa Cecilia in Rome. In 1876, he was given an official position on the Sinalunga city council, a position he held until his death, even though his commitment was necessarily subject to his many other activities. In 1879 he conducted Verdi's Il Trovatore at the theatre in Sinalunga, now named after him, and supported the local orchestra, which was led by his brother, Domenico Pinsuti. In 1885 his opera Margherita was staged in Venice and then in Sinalunga.

Ciro Pinsuti died in Florence on March 10, 1888; his life was celebrated at his official funeral on April 10, 1888 in St. Martin's, Sinalunga.

== Works ==
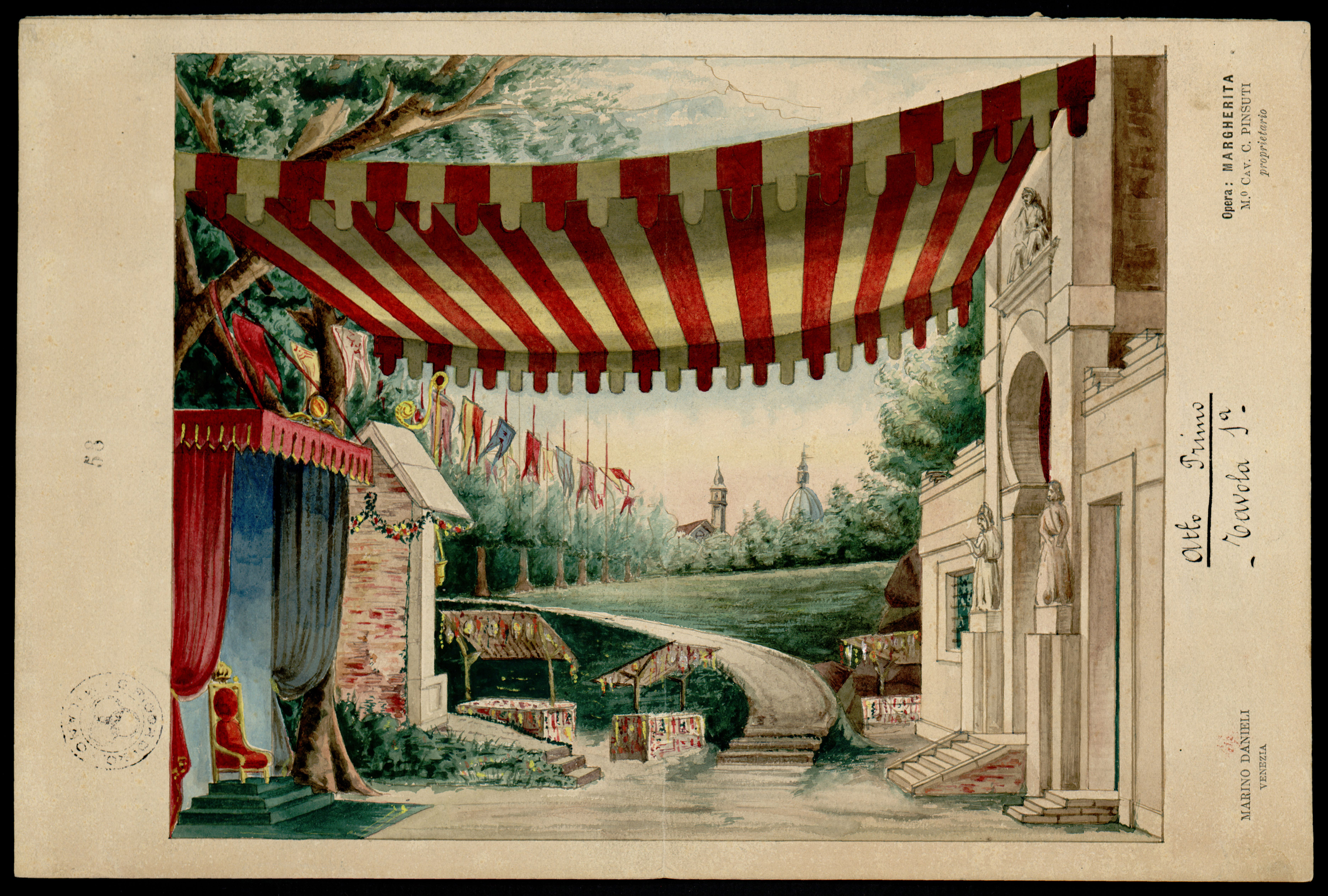
Set design for Act I in the première production of Margherita (1882)

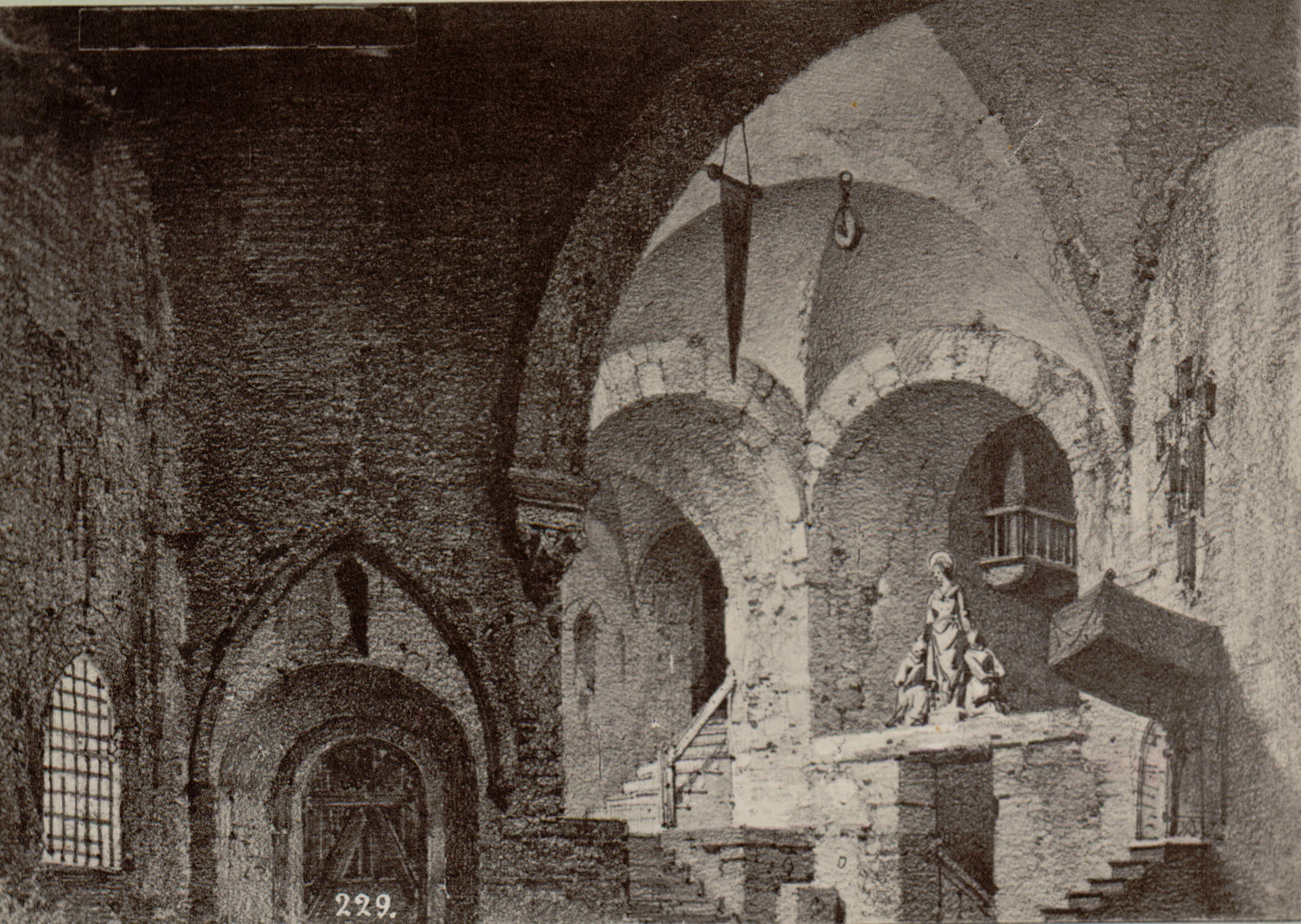
Interno delle prigioni di Praga, set design for Mattia Corvino, prologue (1877).

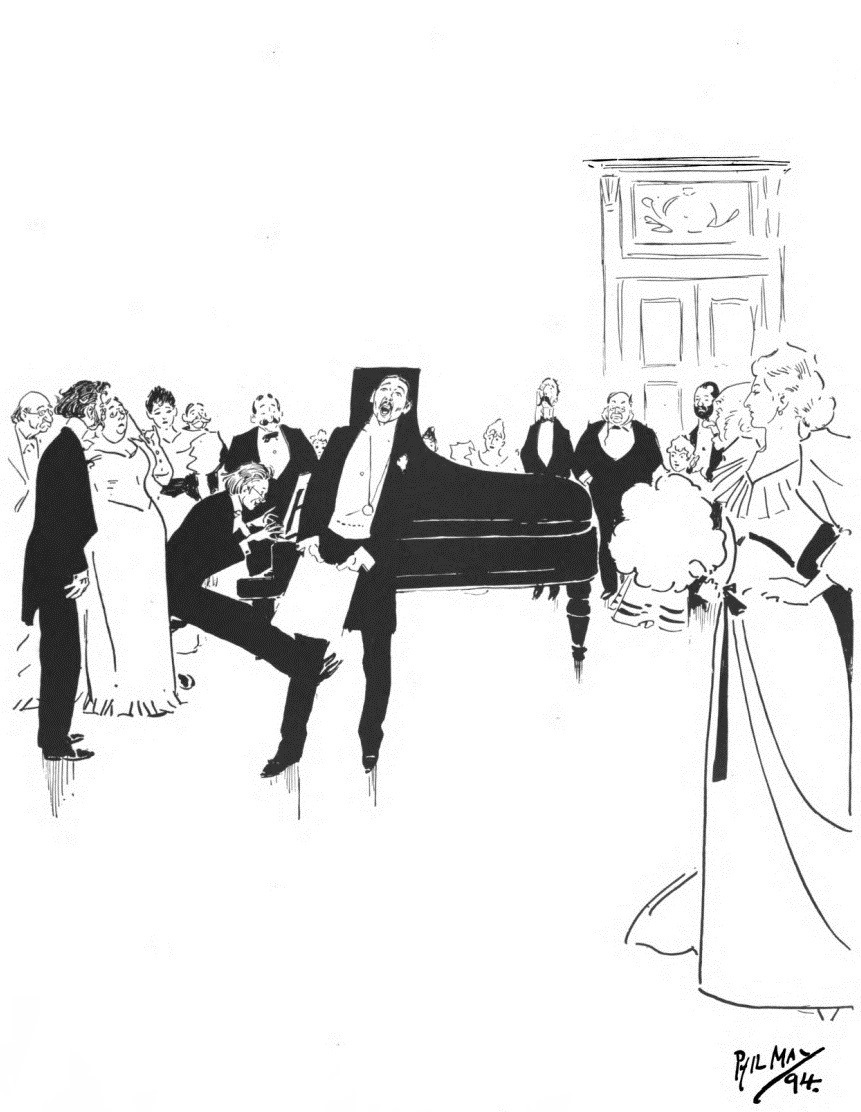
A sketch by Phil May of a singer delivering "I fear no foe". The contrast between the macho lyrics of this Pinsuti song and the genteel context in which it was typically sung was picked up by several satirists, including P. G. Wodehouse in Jeeves and the Feudal Spirit.

=== Operas ===
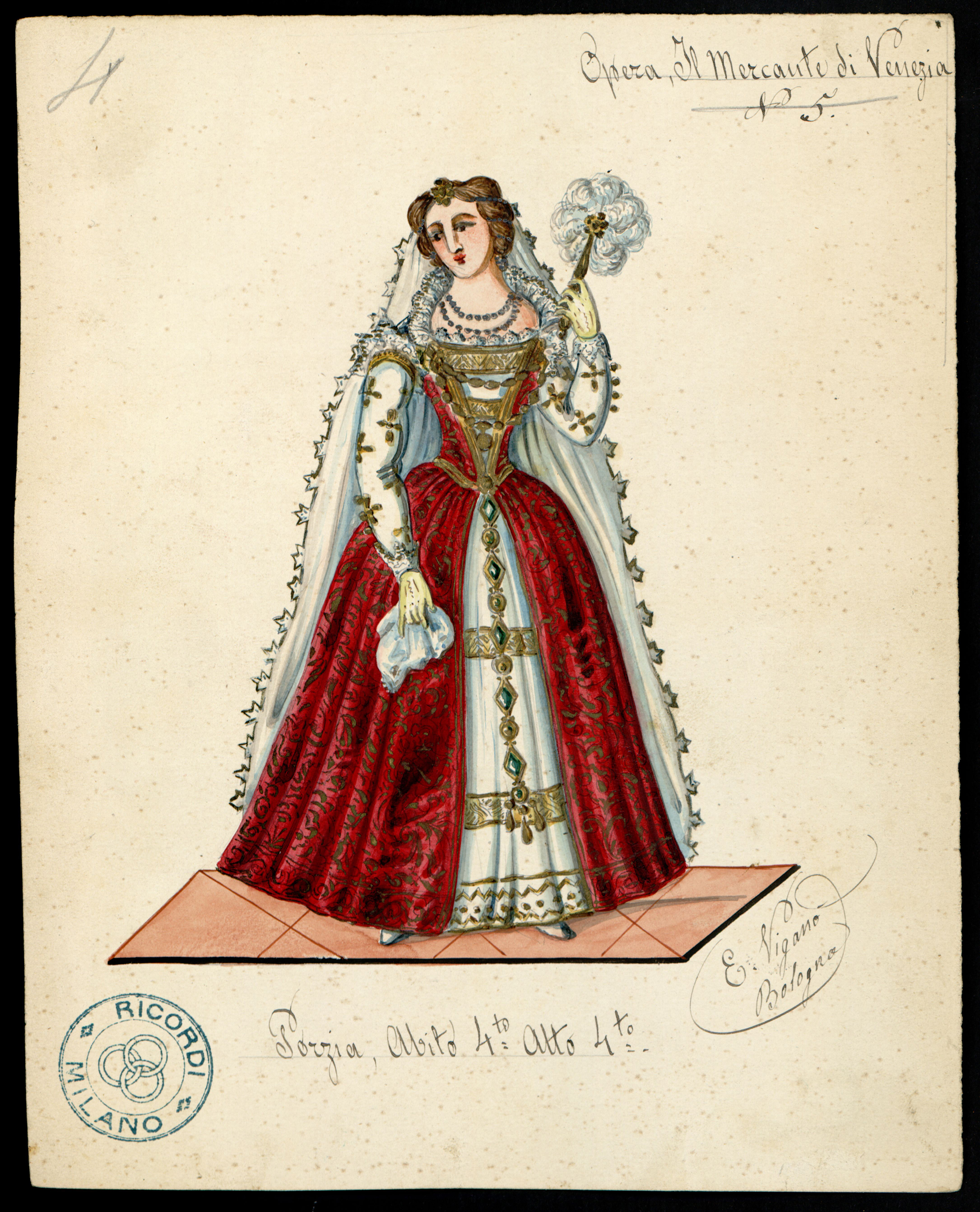
Porzia (soprano), costume design for Il mercante di Venezia act 4 (1873).

Pinsuti composed three operas:

- Margherita, performed for the first time at Teatro La Fenice in Venice in 1882 and three years later in the Municipal Theatre of Sinalunga in 1885. This work is a lyrical drama in four acts, with libretto written by A. Zanardini.
- Il mercante di Venezia (The Merchant of Venice), performed for the first time at the Teatro Comunale di Bologna on 8 November 1873. This is an opera in four acts based on the play by Shakespeare, with libretto by G. T. Cimino.
- Mattia Corvino (Matthias Corvinus), performed for the first time at the Teatro alla Scala in Milan on March 24, 1877, a lyrical drama in a prologue and three acts. The libretto was by Carlo D'Ormeville.

=== Songs ===
In Britain and America Pinsuti was best known for his parlour songs. One of these ballads titled "Beatrice - Kind and so modest", was a setting of Dante's sonnet XXVI from La Vita Nuova. His song "I fear no foe", to words by E. Oxenford, was popular and widely-sung in Britain. Other widely recorded songs included the "Bedouin love song" and "Welcome, pretty primrose". Performers who recorded his songs included Peter Dawson, J. W. Myers, Clarence Whitehill and Jules Levy. His aria il libro santo was recorded by Magda Olivero. The choral song Good night, good night, beloved has been recorded by The Sixteen.
