= Hugh Aston =

English composer

Hugh Aston (also spelled Asseton, Assheton, Ashton, Haston; c. 1485 – buried 17 November 1558) was an English composer of the early Tudor period. While little of his music survives, he is notable for his innovative keyboard and church music writing. He was also politically active, a mayor, Member of Parliament, and Alderman.

== Biography ==
Hugh Aston was born in Leicester in or around 1485. His father was Alderman Robert Aston, a Senior Burgess of Leicester's South Ward. Hugh's subsequent musical education points to the likelihood that his early years were spent as a boy chorister, probably in the Choral College and Hospital of the Annunciation of St Mary in the Newarke, (The Newarke College). This was near the 'South Ward' represented by his father, beside the south gates of medieval Leicester. At the time it was one of the most prestigious of England's provincial choral institutions. A musically gifted boy such as Hugh would begin in the choir aged around 8, and would be one of six boys singing plainsong and newer polyphonic pieces at the daily services, alongside the choir of male professional singers. Hugh could have joined the choir school in 1493 and remained there as an additional lay clerk once his voice broke. In 1502 he left for the Oxford University Music School, from which he is recorded as graduating after 8 years of study in 1510, by which time he was probably aged 25.

=== Bachelor of Music ===
On 27 November 1510 he supplicated for the degree of BMus at Oxford University, proposing for his examination an oration on the volumes of Boethius, and the submission (and performance) of a mass and an antiphon. He stated that he had studied music in the University Music School for eight years. Presumably his study of Boethius was of the 6th century philosopher's De Institutione Musica, which had been published in Venice in 1491 and 1492 (one of the first musical works to be published). The University records show that his examination was successful, and the University ordered that the University Proctors supervising the examination should retain the two manuscripts. It seems most likely that these were Aston's five part Missa Te Deum Laudamus and the clearly associated antiphon Te Deum Laudamus. Though the original manuscripts are not in Music School archives today, excellent early copies of ca. 1528–30 almost certainly made for Cardinal's College (now Christ Church) Oxford are in the Forrest-Heather Part Books now in the Bodleian Library, Oxford.

=== Return to Leicester ===
After 1510 he may have lived in London, and it is suggested that he may have had some association with the court of Henry VIII. In 1517 he is recorded in the Leicester Borough Records Hall Book as being admitted as a 'Freeman and Burgess of the Borough of Leicester'. The brief entry reads, "Hugo Aston de eadem gent". The de eadem means 'of the same' referring to the column heading 'de Leicester', meaning he was born in Leicester. The absence of any qualification shows he was a freeman 'as of right', as the son of a freeman. The term 'gent' (Gentleman) is unusual as it would normally state a person's trade or profession. Rather than implying nobility, in this instance it would seem to be acknowledging his status as a university graduate. In 1520/21 he was paid by the Dean and Chapter of the Collegiate Church of St Mary, Warwick, to advise on the purchase and installing of a new organ. With the pre-1528 Newarke College account books missing from the records, the earliest documentation for Aston's role as choir-master at Leicester is found in the Lincoln Diocesan Records. Aston was called to give testimony as part of Bishop Longland's Visitation on 27 & 28 November 1525. Amongst the long list of injunctions contained in the Bishop's response was a requirement that the Dean and Canons appoint choral vicars of proper competence and suitability, and not appoint 'unteachable' boy choristers. Also during 1525 the same Bishop Longland had recommended Aston to Cardinal Wolsey as a candidate for founder director of music at his new Cardinal's College, Oxford, (now Christ Church College and Cathedral). However Longland had to report that Hugh Aston preferred to stay in Leicester 'considering his greate wages which he alligith in perpetuity' (i.e. he claims they were promised to him for life). Wolsey appointed John Taverner to the Oxford post instead.

From 1531 there are Duchy of Lancaster account books showing that Hugh Aston's 'greate wages' amounted to £10 per year, and rose to £12 from 1539. His appointment in Leicester was that of Keeper of the Organs and Magister Choristerorum (Master of the Choristers) at the major Royal foundation, the Hospital and College of St Mary of the Annunciation. This was first established by Henry, 3rd Earl of Lancaster in 1330, and re-endowed and substantially enlarged by his son Henry, 4th Earl and later 1st Duke of Lancaster under a Charter of 24 March 1355/6. Later known as The Newarke, the institution had a Dean and twelve Canons (later termed Prebends), thirteen Vicars-Choral, four Lay Clerks and six (boy) choristers. By the late 15th century it had achieved a high status and musical reputation and had acquired the privilege, apparently shared only with the Chapels Royal, of having the right to recruit outstanding musicians and singers from other institutions without their consent, in other words to poach the very best musicians of the country. From 1528

The Charters required among many other things the use of the Salisbury ("Sarum") Rite, a daily sung Mass in honour of Our Lady, and also the singing of Matins, a High Mass and Vespers on more than two dozen high feasts, led by the Dean in Choir, so there would have been a heavy musical programme for the choir of around sixteen (including at least some of the Vicars) and its musical director. In addition to his annual wage Aston, also referred to in some documents as a singer and organist, was entitled to receive further significant payments for additional services such as funerals. He also appears to have been retained by six other Midland religious houses: Sulby and Pipewell in Northamptonshire; the abbeys at Coventry and Kenilworth in Warwickshire, and the Leicestershire abbeys of Launde and Leicester Abbey.

=== Dissolution ===
Just 18 months after Aston's retirement the final dissolution of the Newarke Choral Foundation took place at Easter 1548. The almshouse with its chapel was re-branded as 'Trinity Hospital' but the Collegiate Church was demolished along with most of the college buildings. Hugh Aston, on the other hand, continued to live in what appears to have been the official residence of the choir-master. This was a substantial property fronting onto Southgates Street directly opposite the main gate into the Newarke (The Magazine Gateway). On retirement he received not only a £12-a-year pension in respect of his Newarke College office, which was honoured by the state following the Dissolution, but he also received further pensions totalling £6 13s. 4d. in respect of loss of office at the six other suppressed choral institutions. Furthermore, he had been granted a life tenancy on the Southgates property, with its with barns, gardens and paddocks, and his wife, Elizabeth Aston, had been awarded the right to a 21 year lease to commence on the death of her husband. With the lease transferred to their son Robert Aston, and subsequent renegotiations with the Duchy of Lancaster and the Burough Council, the property remained the family home until at least 1595 and possibly into their grandson's time in the early 17th century.

=== Civic responsibilities ===
Before 1530 Hugh Aston was already representing the Southgates Ward in which he lived as a member of the Town council and later as a Borough Alderman, and by 1550 the Ward was even being referred to in the Leicester Borough Records as "the Ward of Mr Hugh Aston". From 1532 he was a Justice of the Peace, Coroner for two years, Auditor of Accounts for a total of 16 years, Mayor for 1541–1542, one of the two Members of Parliament for the Borough for the 1555 Parliament, and remained an Alderman to his death.

== Commemorations ==
The exact date of his death is not known, but he was buried on 17 November 1558 in the parish church for the Southgates Ward, St Margaret's.

Anniversary service
On 15 November 2008 a 450th anniversary Commemorative Service was held in St Margaret's Church, Leicester, featuring two of Aston’s surviving antiphons, two known keyboard pieces and much of the Sarum Rite plainsong music for the Requiem Mass of the pre-Reformation Sarum liturgy, which had been restored by Queen Mary.

Hugh Aston Building
Most of the buildings of the medieval Hospital and College of the Newarke, including the Collegiate Church much admired by Leland during his visit in ca. 1535, were demolished soon after the Dissolution. Today the campus of De Montfort University covers almost the whole collegiate site. In March 2015 the University opened a new DMU Heritage Centre incorporating the remaining ruins of the Church of the Annunciation together with displays explaining the history of the Newarke area. On 17 March 2010 Patrick McKenna, founder and Chief Executive of Ingenious Media, declared open De Montfort University's new £35 million Faculty of Business and Law, adjacent to the great Gateway to The Newarke and only 100 metres or so from the site of Aston's Hangman's Lane house: this new building is called the Hugh Aston Building. The event was also marked by performances by singers from the choir of the Holy Cross Dominican Priory, New Walk, Leicester (directed by David Cowen) of sections from Aston's Te Deum Mass and Te Deum, two of Aston's keyboard compositions, and some of the 'Sarum Rite' medieval plainsong for 17 March – St. Patrick's Day.

== Works ==
Four sacred vocal compositions by Aston survive substantially complete:

Masses

- Missa Te Deum (five voices)
- Missa Videte manus meas (six voices)
- Gaude mater matris Christe (five voices)
- Te Deum laudamus (five voices)

Antiphones:

- Ave Maria Ancilla Trinitatus
- Ave Maria divae matris Annae
- Gaude Mater Matris Christi (some copies have Gaude Virgo Matris Christi)
- O baptista vates Christi (five voice: SATTB, reconstructed)
- Te Matrem Dei Laudamus
- Devotional song: Ave Domina Sancta

Keyboard Music

- Hornepype
- My Lady Carey's Dompe (attrib)
- The Short Measure of My Lady Wynkfyld's Rownde Again (attrib)

Hugh Aston's Hornpipe (harpsichord)

Other compositions may survive in fragments. His keyboard music, although with few surviving examples, showed an unusually progressive use of idiomatic keyboard: his Hornepype in particular is often cited as an example of early idiomatic keyboard writing. Some other famous early keyboard pieces have been attributed to him on stylistic grounds, including the often-recorded and anthologized My Lady Careys Dompe and My Lady Wynkfyld's Rownde.

A lost piece, known as 'Hugh Aston's Grounde', was copied by William Byrd in his Hugh Aston's Maske

== Recordings ==
Music for Compline, Stile Antico, Harmonia Mundi USA HMU 907419. Includes Aston's Gaude, virgo mater Christi and works by Byrd, Tallis, Sheppard and White.

Two Tudor Masses for the Cardinal, Christ Church Oxford Cathedral Choir, directed by Stephen Darlington. Metronome UK 1998, MET CD1030. Disc 2 is Hugh Aston's Missa Videte Manus Meas.

Three Marian Antiphons : Music from the Peterhouse Partbooks, directed by Scott Metcalfe. Blue Heron 2010, B003KWVNXS.

== References and further reading ==
- Aston, Hugh (d. 1558), Nick Sandon. Oxford Dictionary of National Biography, 2004
- Hugh Aston, John Marbeck, and Osbert Parsley. Tudor Church Music vol. X. Oxford University Press, 1929
- Bergsagel, John (1980). "Aston, Hugh". In Sadie, Stanley (ed.). The New Grove Dictionary of Music and Musicians. Vol. i (1st ed.). London: Macmillan. pp. 661–662.
- Boylan, Patrick J (2008). "Hugh Aston (c. 1485–1558): Composer and Mayor of Leicester" (PDF). Leicestershire Historian. 44. Leicester Archaeological and Historical Society: 26–30.
- Boylan, Patrick J (2020). "The identity of the early Tudor composer Hugh Aston, c1585-1558". Transactions of the Leicestershire Archaeological and Historical Society. 94: 115–142. ISSN 0140-3990.
- Nick Sandon. "Another mass by Hugh Aston?" Early Music, vol. 9(2), pp. 184 – 191, 1981.
- Oliver Neighbour. "Hugh Aston's Variations on a Ground". Early Music, vol. 10(2), pp. 215–216. 1982.
- A. Hamilton Thompson. The History of the Hospital and the New College of the Annunciation of St Mary in The Newarke, Leicester. Leicester: Leicestershire Archaeological Society, 1937.
- Visitations in the Diocese of Lincoln Volume 3, 1517–1531, edited by A. Hamilton Thompson. Lincoln Record Society vol. 37. 1947.
- Records of the Borough of Leicester Volume III, 1509–1603, M. Bateson. Cambridge University Press. 1905.
- Gustave Reese, Music in the Renaissance. New York, W. W. Norton & Co., 1954. ISBN 0-393-09530-4
- F. Ll. Harrison, Music in Medieval Britain. London, 1958.
