= Luigi Torchi (musician) =

Italian musicologist

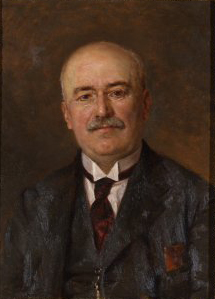
Luigi Torchi (portrait by Giuseppe Tivoli, ca. 1914)

Luigi Torchi (7 November 1858 – 18 September 1920) was an Italian musicologist.

Torchi was born in Mordano (province of Bologna). He studied composition at the Accademia Filarmonica di Bologna, at the Music conservatories of Naples with Paolo Serrao and later in France and Germany, where he benefited from the teaching of Salomon Jadassohn and Carl Reinecke in Leipzig. At the same time he also devoted himself to the study of literature in Italy, where he returned definitively in 1884. From 1885 to 1891 he taught music history and was a librarian at the Liceo Musicale Rossini in Pesaro and in the following years he was a teacher of composition at the Liceo Musicale (now the Conservatorio Giovanni Battista Martini) in Bologna. From 1894 to 1904 he was the publisher of the Rivista musicale italiana, to which he contributed with various studies and articles of criticism.

Married to Teresina Marchesini, they had two children, Steno Torchi (who died at a young age for having picked up an unexploded mine from the ground) and Atte Torchi (16 July 1907 - 25 March 2002).

He spent the last years of his life in the summer residence Villa Atte (dedicated to his daughter) located in the hills of Bazzano (Province of Bologna).

Torchi died in Bologna at age 61.

== Publications ==
- La scuola romantica in Germania e i suoi rapporti coll'opera nazionale e colla musica, p. 83, 91, 101 (1884)
- Riccardo Wagner: studio critico (1890)
- Canzoni ed arie italiane ad una voce nel secolo XVII, p. 581-656 (1894)
- L'accompagnamento degl'istrumenti nei melodrammi italiani della prima metà del seicento, p. 7-38 and 666-71 (1894)
- Robert Schumann e le sue "Scene tratte dal Faust di Goethe, p. 381-419 (1895)
- La musica istrumentale in Italia nei secoli XVI, XVII e XVIII, vol. IV p. 581-630 (1897), vol. V p. 64-84, 281-320, 455-89 (1898), vol. VI p. 255-88 and 693-726 (1899), vol. VII p. 233-51 (1900), vol. VIII p. 1-42 (1901)
- L'opera di Giuseppe Verdi e i suoi caratteri principali, p. 297-325 (1901)
- I monumenti dell'antica musica francese a Bologna, p. 451-505 and 575-615 (1906)
- L'arte musicale in Italia: pubblicazione nazionale delle più importanti opere musicali italiane dal secolo XIV al XVII, tratte da codici, antichi manoscritti ed edizioni primitive, scelte, trascritte in notazione moderna, messa in partitura ed annotate (1907)
