= Tito Gotti =

Italian conductor and musicologist (1927–2024)

- Born: 6 June 1927; Bologna, Italy
- Died: 11 May 2024 (aged 96); Bologna, Italy
- Education: Conservatorio Giovanni Battista Martini
- Occupations: Orchestra conductor Musicologist; Essayist

Tito Gotti (6 July 1927 – 11 May 2024) was an Italian orchestra conductor, musicologist, and essayist. Gotti died on 11 May 2024, at the age of 96.

== Discography ==
- Les grandes heures de San Petronio de Bologne
- En la Basilique San Petronio de Bologne
- La Basilique Saint Marc de Venise
- Messa a cinque voci e 2 salmi
- Six concertos italiens pour trompette et orchestre
- Concerto per organo e orchestra
- Die Zauberharfe
- Alcide al bivio

== Essays ==
- Guida all'analisi della polifonia vocale (1962)
- Bologna musicale del ‘700 e Cristoforo Gluck, in Due secoli di vita musicale (1966)
- L'opera. Appunti per una analisi (1968)
- Direzione e concertazione (1972)
- Beethoven a Bologna nell'Ottocento (1973)
- Spiriti della musica in Emilia e Romagna (1974)
- Erudizione e insolita drammaturgia nella storia di Oleg (1986)
- Partecipiamo a… (1986)
- Con sospesa ed incantata gratitudine (2004)
- Editoriali per i programmi delle Feste Musicali 1967-2003 (2007)

== Awards ==
- Franco Abbiati Prize (1983)
- Franco Abbiati Prize (1993)
- Premio Imola (2001)
- Golden Neptune (2006)
- Premio Stefano Bottari (2012)
- Premio Battistino (2013)
