= Gaetano Gaspari =

Italian composer, bibliographer, and historian of music

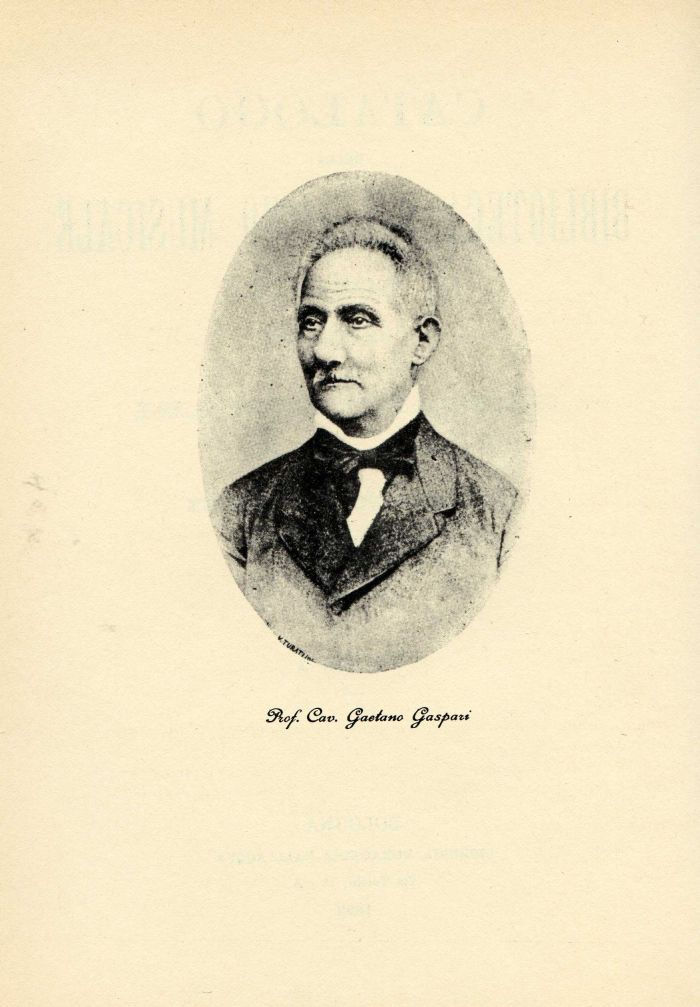
Gaetano Gaspari

Gaetano Gaspari (15 March 1807/1808 in Bologna – 31 March 1881) was an Italian composer, bibliographer, and historian of music. He composed mainly liturgical music, including the Offertorium of the Messa per Rossini. He studied with Benedetto Donelli at the Liceo Musicale in Bologna from 1820 to 1827, where he won first prizes in piano and counterpoint. He simultaneously served as the organist at San Martino, Bologna from 1824 to 1827. From 1828 to 1836, he was conductor of the municipal orchestra and maestro di cappella of the Collegiata at Pieve di Cento. He also served as chorus master of the Imola Cathedral and taught vocal exercises at the Liceo Musicale (now the Conservatorio Giovanni Battista Martini). His Zibaldone musicale contains a classification of the collections of the Liceo's music library, and served as the basis for the Catalogo della Biblioteca del Liceo musicale di Bologna.

== Sources ==
- Biography from oxfordmusiconline.com (only for subscribers to the online service)
- List of works by Gaspari
