= Chiara Benati =

Italian composer

- Born: 20 July 1956 (age 70); Bologna, Italy
- Education: Bologna Conservatory
- Occupation: Composer

Chiara Benati (born 18 July 1956) is an Italian composer. She was born in Bologna, Italy, and studied piano, conducting and composition with Paolo Renosto and Cesare Augusto at the Bologna Conservatory.

After completing her education, Benati took a position teaching harmony and counterpoint at the G.B. Martini Conservatory of Bologna. In 1992, she was chosen as the representative of Italian contemporary music at the Arts Institute of Chicago. Her music has been performed and broadcast internationally.

== Works ==
Selected works include:

- Capriccio for guitar
- Come Erba Sotto la Terra, song cycle
- Idylls, lyrics by Andrea Iezzi for voice and guitar
- Voci for flute, violin and piano (1989)
- Variazioni su una sequenza di Maderna for harp (1991)
- Chthon for flute and percussion (1991)
- Ove s'asconde un rivo for flute (1991)
- Di lievi rintocchi for guitar and piano (1988)
- Trio (in memoria di Luigi Nono) for violin, cello and piano (1991)
- Un Agnus Dei sul cantusfirmus di Frye for madrigal choir and orchestra
- Canto per Irma for Soprano voice and string orchestra

Her music has been recorded and issued on CD, including:

- Chiara BenatiPAN 3063
