= Riccardo Nielsen =

- Born: March 3, 1908; Bologna
- Died: January 31, 1982 (aged 73); Ferrara
- Education: Bologna Conservatory (1931)
- Occupation: Composer

Riccardo Nielsen (March 3, 1908, Bologna – January 31, 1982, Ferrara) was an Italian composer and music educator. He graduated from the Bologna Conservatory in 1931 with a diploma in music composition. He also studied privately with Alfredo Casella and Carlo Gatti. He served as the superintendent of the Teatro Comunale di Bologna from 1946 through 1950, and in 1952 was appointed director of the Conservatory of Ferrara.

Nielsen's early composition were written in neoclassical style reminiscent of the work of Igor Stravinsky. He later embraced musical modernism and adopted serialism and twelve-tone technique after the style of Arnold Schönberg. He composed orchestral music, chamber music, choral works, and art songs. He composed two operas: the monodrama L’incubo (1948) and the radio opera La via di Colombo (1953).
