= Paolo Renosto =

Italian composer, conductor, pianist, and music critic (1935–1988)

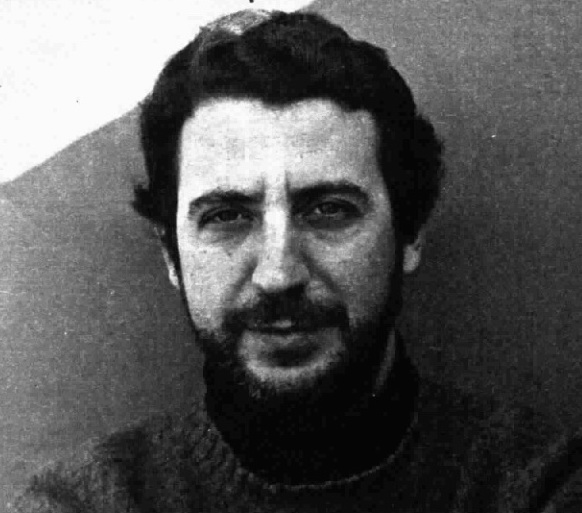
- Born: 10 October 1935; Florence, Italy
- Died: 10 February 1988 (aged 52); Reggio Calabria, Italy
- Other name: Lesiman
- Occupation: Composer

Paolo Renosto (10 October 1935 – 10 February 1988) was an Italian composer, conductor and pianist.

Born in Florence, Renosto was educated at the conservatory of his hometown, where he studied piano and composition under Roberto Lupi, who influenced Renosto's work. He later became a pupil, a collaborator, and friend of Bruno Maderna, who was the official conductor for the world premieres of two of the most important compositions of Renosto, "Forma op.7" (1968) and "Nacht" (1969). Renosto later dedicated to Maderna's memory the composition "Concerto per pianoforte e orchestra" (1975).

Renosto was author of symphonic, choral, chamber, solo and incidental music compositions. He was also a musical critic and historian, and he collaborated with RAI as creator and host of several radio programs dedicated to contemporary classical music. He also composed, sometimes under the pseudonym Lesiman, theme music for films, TV-programs and documentaries. He died of a heart attack. He taught on the faculty of the Bologna Conservatory where one of his pupils was Chiara Benati.
