= Júlíus Vífill Ingvarsson =

Icelandic politician

Reykjavík City Council
- In office May 31, 2013 – April 4, 2016
- Majority: 7016

Personal details
- Party: Independence Party

Júlíus Vífill Ingvarsson is an Icelandic politician and lawyer who served as an Independence Party member of Reykjavík City Council. He resigned in 2016 after he was implicated in the Panama Papers.

== Education ==
- 1972 Graduated from Reykjavik College
- 1973–1976 Student of the College of Music
- 1976–1977 Student Reykjavík Academy of Singing and Vocal Arts
- 1977 University of Music and Performing Arts, Vienna
- 1979 a law degree from the University of Iceland
- 1979–1982 Conservatorio Giovanni Battista Martini in Bologna, Italy
- 1993 District Court Attorney

== City Council ==
- 2010–2016 Member of the City Council, was also in the years 1999–2002 the Council
- 2008–2010 Chairman of Planning Council, Council member 2010–
- 2008–2010 chairman of Associated Icelandic Ports. an independently operated company owned by the city of Reykjavik Board and four other municipalities. Board member 2010 -
- 2008–2010 Chairman of Regional Cooperation in the capital. Committee member 2010–
- 2009 Chairman of the Jury in the competition for the redesign of the port of Reykjavik
- 2008–2010 chairman of the Chess Academy of Reykjavik, a private institution designed to further interest in chess in Reykjavík
- 2008–2010 Board The worldwide network of port cities (Association Internationale Villes et Ports)
- 2008–2010 Board Reykjavik Energy
- 2007–2010 Board Austurhöfn, the Reykjavik Art Museum
- 2007–2008 Chairman of the Board of Appeal Malbikunarstöðin hf.
- 2007–2008 chairman of the center of Reykjavik
- 2006–2008 chairman of the education council
- 2006–2008 Member of the Culture and Tourist Board
- 2002 The adhoc committee on the future musical Reykjavik
- 1999–2002 City Council member
- 1998–2002 Member of the Organising
- 1998–2002 Member of the Cultural Committee

He resigned in the wake of the 2016 Panama Papers.

== Community work ==
- 2009–present Board Mechanism Caring
- 2003–2010 chairman of the Reykjavik Music Society
- 2003–2007 Board (Commission) UNICEF
- 1996–2006 Board of Community Association of the Independence Party in Nes- and Melahverfi
- 1994 founding member of the Rotary Club of Reykjavik – Downtown
- 1991–1993 Board (vice) Opera Workshop
- 1988–1994 Board Anna K. Nordal trust, and organization that provides music scholarships
- 1988 Appointed by the Minister of Education to the Committee on the future operating situation in Iceland
- 1986–1993 Chairman Vocal Fund opera department of the Icelandic actor
- In 1986–1991 Acting Council, the executive order in 1991
- 1986–1989 Chairman of the opera department of the Icelandic actor
- 1976–1977 Director Úlfljótur Law Review
- 1974–1975 Board member and editor Vaka Vaka's Monthly
- 1974–1975 Chairman of the Nordic Council of Law NSJR
