= Claudio Brizi =

Italian organist and harpsichordist

Claudio Brizi (born 1960) is an Italian organist and harpsichordist.

== Life ==
Born in Terni, he graduated in organ and organ composition with W. v. d. Pol at the Morlacchi Conservatory in Perugia, then specialized with J.Uriol, M.Radulescu, M.Morgan. Also studied harpsichord with A.Conti at the Conservatorio Giovanni Battista Martini in Bologna. He teaches organ and organ composition at "Francesco Morlacchi" in Perugia.

== Discography ==
- Claviorgan Wonderland – Camerata Tokyo CMCD-28244
- Georg Friedrich Händel, Antonio Vivaldi, Carl Philipp Emanuel Bach – Sonate per Oboe e Basso Continuo (with Thomas Indermühle) Camerata Tokyo CMCD-28219
- Carl Philipp Emanuel Bach – Sonatas for Flute and obligate Claviorgan (2 CDs, with Wolfgang Schulz) Camerata Tokyo CMCD-20099-100
- Johann Ludwig Krebs – Sonate per oboe e Claviorgano Obbligato (with Thomas Indermühle) Camerata Tokyo CMCD-28145
- Domenico Zipoli – Complete Keyboard works (2 CDs) Camerata Tokyo CMCD-20082-3
- Wolfgang Amadeus Mozart – Sonate Kv 10-15 (with Giuseppe Nova)Camerata Tokyo CMCD-28101
- Johann Sebastian Bach – Brandenburg Concerto N. 5 BWV 1050, Triple Concerto in a-minor BWV 1044 (live recording) & Italian Concerto BWV 971 (Wolfgang Schulz, Paolo Franceschini, I solisti di Perugia, Gary Graden) Camerata Tokyo CMCD-28057
- Muzio Clementi – Sonate Op. 2 N. 3 & Op. 31 for Claviorgano and flute; Sonate Op. 21 N. 1 & N. 2 & Op. 22 N. 1 for Claviorgano flute and Cello (Flute: Naotaka Nishida, Cello Francesco Pepicelli) Camerata Tokyo CMCD-28035
- Duo a la Francaise – C. Saint-Saëns: 6 Duos Op. 8; M. Dupré: Variations sur deux Thèmes op. 35; Jean Guillou: Colloques n. 2 (Piano, Bruno Canino)Camerata Tokyo CMCD-28015
- Antonio Vivaldi – Concerto in La minore RV 462, Sonata in Do maggiore RV 779, Concerto in sol minore RV 107, Concerto in fa maggiore “La Tempesta di Mare” RV 98, Concerto in sol minore “La Notte” RV 104, Concerto in re maggiore “Del Gardellino” RV 90 (Flute: Mario Ancilotti, Oboe: Thomas Indermühle, Violin: Paolo Franceschini, Bassetthorn: Wolfgang Meyer, Fagott: Milan Turkovic; “I Solisti di Perugia”) Camerata Tokyo CMCD-28019
- Wolfgang Amadeus Mozart – Missa Solemnis “Weisenhausmesse” K. 139 (Soprano: Edith Mathis, Kusatsu Festival Academy Orchestra & Chorus, Conductor: Jörg Ewald Dähler) Camerata Tokyo CDT-1049
- Johann Sebastian Bach – Sonata in g minor BWV 1029, Trio in G Maj BWV 655, Sonata in E flat Maj BWV 1016, Trio in g minor BWV 660, Sonata in G Maj BWV 1019 Duo in g minor BWV 768, Sonata in B minor BWV 1014 (Oboe: Thomas Indermühle) Camerata Tokyo CMCD-28052
- F. Chopin/R. Schumann – Piano Concertos for Piano & Organ 12 hands (Piano: Hiromi Okada & Costantino Catena) Camerata Tokyo CMCD-28293
- Georg Friedrich Händel, Aci, Galatea e Polyfemio. (2 CD’s) (Sopren: Daniela Uccello; Alt: Sonia Turchetta; bass: Giancarlo Tosi; Orchestra Camerata del Titano. Dir. Augusto Ciavatta) Dynamic CDS 272/1-2
- Girolamo Fantini – Otto Sonate per tromba e organo (Tromba Barocca: Igino Conforzi) Quadrivium SCA 025
