= Brett Leighton =

Australian organist. and harpsichordist

Brett Leighton is an Australian freelance organist and harpsichordist who has lived in Europe for more than 40 years and was Professor of Organ at the Anton Bruckner Privatuniversität in Linz, Austria from 1994 until retirement in November 2020. He is featured on four CD releases including Orgel Landschaft Ober-Österreich II (1998), Brett Leighton an der West-Orgel in Taufkirchen/Pram (1998) Music for Organ and Zink (2005), The World's Oldest Organ and The Organ of the Stadtkirche St.Marien, Celle. He has three times served on the jury of the competition for Paul Hofhaimer Prize of the City of Innsbruck (2004, 2007 and 2019) and will do so again in 2022 for its twentieth edition.

== Press ==
- Concert reviews in Oberösterreichische Nachrichten: Apr. 13, 2005, Jun. 24, 2005, Oct. 13, 2006 (in German)
- Concert announcement in Der Vinschger, calling his music "first-class and legendary" (in German)
- Concert announcement in Österreich Journal, Sep. 3, 2003 (in German).
- Concert announcement in La Gazzetta del Mezzogiorno, Jan. 22, 2005 (in Italian)
- Concert announcement in El Diario Vasco, Apr. 25, 2006, calling Leighton "one of the great specialists of the baroque repertoire" (in Spanish).
