= Liuwe Tamminga =

Dutch organist and harpsichordist (1953–2021)

Liuwe Tamminga (25 September 1953 – 29 April 2021) was a Dutch organist and harpsichordist, known for his performances of Italian Early Music.

== Biography ==
Liuwe Tamminga was born in Hemelum. He received his musical education at the Groningen Conservatory and obtained his diploma in 1977 under Wim van Beek, after which he went to study in Paris with André Isoir and Jean Langlais, and eventually in Italy with Luigi Ferdinando Tagliavini.

From 1982 onwards, he was the organist at the Basilica di San Petronio in Bologna, which contains historic organs by Lorenzo da Prato (1471–1475) and Baldassarre Malamini (1596). He shared this position for many years with Luigi Ferdinando Tagliavini who died in 2017.

His performances of Renaissance and Baroque music, especially Italian, earned him the praise of specialized critics, as well as many awards. He held concerts all over the world and taught master classes in the most important early music institutions (at the Academy for Italian Organ Music in Pistoia, at the Haarlem Summer Academy for Organists, in Boston etc.). For many years he has collaborated with distinguished early music directors and performers, such as Frans Brüggen, Bruce Dickey, Sergio Vartolo and with such respected ensembles as the Concerto Palatino and Odhecaton.

He contributed to the rediscovery and appreciation of less well-known composers, such as Fiorenzo Maschera, Marco Antonio Cavazzoni and Jacques Buus, and has published editions of works by Cavazzoni and Buus, among others. He recorded two compact discs of organ works by Puccini who was an organist in his early years.

He was the Curator of the San Colombano Museum – Tagliavini Collection in Bologna, a unique collection of instruments – both for its quality and for the number of instruments shown – inaugurated in 2010. Mostly dating from the sixteenth through the nineteenth century, the instruments include clavichords, organs, harpsichords, spinets, pianos, and automatic instruments, as well as a few wind and folk instruments. He died in Bologna on 29 April 2021, aged 67.

== Recordings ==
- 1991 – Andrea e Giovanni Gabrieli: Gli organi della Basilica di San Petronio -con Luigi Ferdinando Tagliavini- (Tactus)
- 1991 – Maestri Padani e Fiamminghi. Gli organi storici della Basilica di San Petronio I (Tactus)
- 1995 – Musica Nova, Venice 1540 (Tactus)
- 1997 – Palestrina – Giovanni de Macque. Works for organ (Accent)
- 1998 – Girolamo Frescobaldi, Works for Organ (Accent)
- 1998 – Ricercari. The art of the ricercar in 16th century Italy (Accent)
- 1999 – The Hermans organs in Pistoia and Collescipoli (Accent)
- 2000 – Organi antichi dell'Appenino bolognese (Tactus)
- 2003 – Basilicata. A musical journey in the Provinces of Naples (Accent)
- 2004 – Marco Antonio Cavazzoni. The complete Organ Works (Accent)
- 2005 – Girolamo Frescobaldi. Fantasie (1608) Canzoni (1615) (Accent)
- 2006 – Mozart on Italian organs (Accent)
- 2006 – Organi antichi dell'Appenino modenese (Tactus)
- 2008 – Islas Canarias. Historic organs of the Canary Islands (Accent)
- 2008 – Fiorenzo Maschera. Libro primo de canzoni da sonare (Passacaille)
- 2008 – Puccini, the organist (Passacaille)
- 2010 – Girolamo Frescobaldi. Ricercari (1615) (Passacaille)
- 2011 – Il Ballo di Mantova. Organ music in s. Barbara, Mantua (Accent)
- 2012 – Girolamo Frescobaldi. Capricci (1624) (Passacaille)
- 2012 – Giovanni Gabrieli. Canzoni (Passacaille)
- 2017 – Puccini, Organ works (Passacaille)

== Publications ==
- Orgellitteratuur bij het Liedboek voor de Kerken, Baarn Bosch & van Keuning, 1983
- Italienische Meister um 1600: 5 Stücke für zwei Orgeln, Doblinger Verlag, 1988
- Musica Nova Ricercari (Venezia 1540), Andromeda editrice, 2001
- Giovanni de Macque Opere per tastiera – Vol. I Capricci-Stravaganze-Canzoni etc., Andromeda editrice, 2002
- Giovanni Pierluigi da Palestrina Ricercari sugli otto toni, Thesaurum absconditum, Andromeda editrice, 2003
- Jacques Buus Intabolatura d’Organo di Ricercari (Venezia 1549), Arnaldo Forni editore, 2004
- Marco Antonio Cavazzoni Recerchari Motetti Canzoni (Venezia 1523), Il Levante Libreria Editrice, 2008

== Prizes and awards ==
- 1979 Premier Prix d’interprétation (Conservatoire d’Orsay, France)
- 1980 First prize of the National Organ Improvisation (Netherlands)
- 1981 Second Prix d’improvisation (Conservatoire d’Orsay, France)
- 1982 Prix d’excellence (Conservatory of Groningen)
- 1991 Choc de la musique, Premio Internazionale Antonio Vivaldi della Fondazione Cini di Venezia
- 1997 Choc de la musique
- 2004 Miglionico (Basilicata), medaglia d’oro Madonna della Porticella 2003
- 2005 Preis der Deutschen Schallplattenkritik
- 2006 Preis der Deutschen Schallplattenkritik
