= Luciano Ravaglia =

Italian engineer

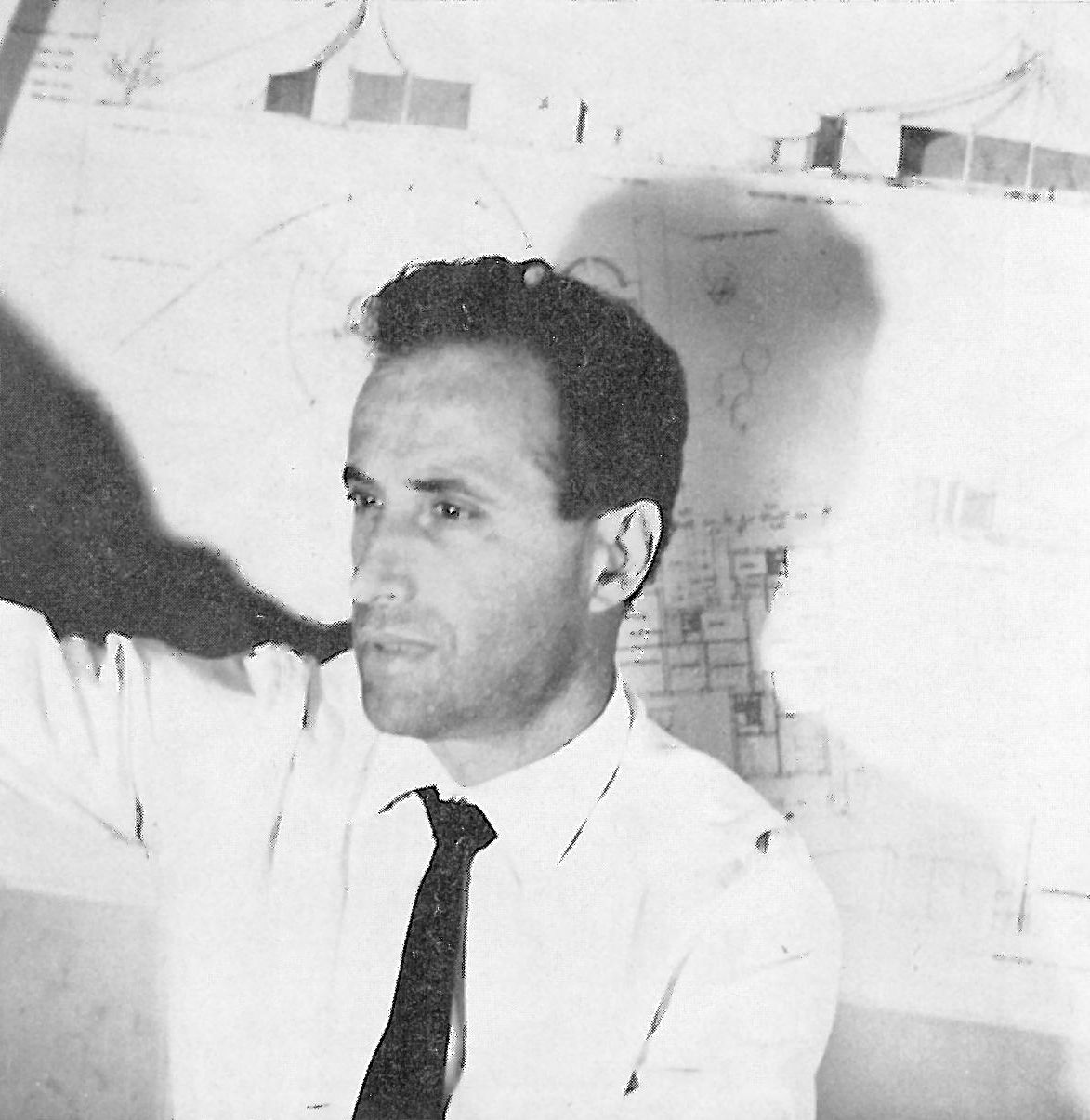
Image of Luciano Ravaglia

Luciano Ravaglia (13 December 1923, in Forlimpopoli – 26 January 2017, in Dovadola) was an Italian engineer and member of the Rotary Club of Forlì, D 2072, Italy. In 1979, when the United States saw its last case of polio, Sergio Mulitsch di Palmenberg, the celebrated Rotarian from the Treviglio Club, joined the Rotary 3-H (Hunger, Health and Humanity) project and volunteered to try out a vaccination campaign which, starting from Italy, took the first doses of polio vaccine to the Philippines, a country which was then badly affected by the disease. This marked the beginning of a Rotary project known as Polio2005, and later renamed PolioPlus, resulting in the vaccination of more than 6 million children in that country.

A director of Rotary International from the Philippines, Sabino “Benny” Santos, loved to recall how, when it came to polio immunization in his country “Even before we received the first shipment of oral polio vaccine purchased with money authorized by the Rotary International board, we received 500,000 doses in a shipment as a gift from Italian schoolchildren to the schoolchildren of the Philippines. This came through the efforts of Past District Governor Sergio Mulitsch and the newly chartered Rotary Club of Treviglio e della Pianura Bergamasca. The Italian schoolchildren had donated their snack money to purchase the vaccines” .

== Biography ==
Ravaglia was famous as an engineer both in Italy and abroad for his cutting-edge city-planning and building solutions. In 1983, Sergio Mulitsch was joined in his philanthropic work, as previously mentioned, by Luciano Ravaglia, Rotarian from the Forlì Rotary Club. The vaccination campaigns were subsequently repeated in the Philippines, and reached as far as Morocco. The two Italians, together with a few other willing members, founded an NGO called “Nuovi spazi al servire”, in order to achieve Rotarian objectives and humanitarian missions. When Mulitsch was appointed as chairman of the national PolioPlus committee of the Italian Rotary Club, Luciano Ravaglia became his deputy. Over the next few years, Ravaglia worked with dedication and enthusiasm to gain recognition from the Ministry of Foreign Affairs for the NGO “Nuovi spazi al servire”. The international mission of the association was led by Ravaglia from 1987 onwards, when he was appointed as president of the NGO after Mulitsch's death. “Nuovi spazi al servire” has always been supported by Rotarian volunteers and, in addition to raising funds for the PolioPlus project, it has also been involved, under Ravaglia's guidance, in several initiatives to help some of the world's poorest countries, from Brazil to the Ivory Coast, from Argentina to Zambia.

== Publications ==
- “Ricerca sperimentale sul territorio di una Provincia”, Edizioni Servizio Geologico d’Italia, Roma, 1962.
- “Per un piano generale di sviluppo del territorio delle Provincie di Forlì e di Ravenna”, Studi Romagnoli, XX volume, Forlì, 1969.
- “Per un piano integrato del territorio” Discorso ufficiale pronunciato per l’insediamento dei Capitani Reggenti Simone Rossini e Giuseppe Lonfernini. Edizioni di Stato, Repubblica di San Marino, 1970.
- “Il Parco della foresta di Campigna”, Edizioni Rotary, Forlì, 1971.
- “Per un progetto di un complesso ospedaliero innovativo: Ospedale di S. Arcangelo di Romagna”, Edizioni Comune di S. Arcangelo, 1971.
- “Case rustiche di Romagna: sintesi di una ricerca”, Edizione speciale dei Quaderni Romagnoli, Edizioni Cevar, Presenza Romagnola, Roma, 1975.
- “Un’architettura da difendere”, Edizioni C.C.I.A.A., Rotary, E.P.T., Forlì, 1975.
- “Per un centro internazionale termale nell’Alto savio”, Edizioni F.lli Parini, Forlì, 1978.
- “Piano di riassetto dei 78 Comuni dell’Oltrepò”, Edizioni Regione Lombardia, Milano, 1982.
- “Uno sguardo alle origini: relazione pubblica sulla figura e l’opera di un diplomatico vaticano”, Edizioni Nuova Tipografia, Forlimpopoli, 1986.
- "Un uomo - una terra", Edizioni Distretto 207 del Rotary International, 1990.
- “Acque in Romagna: studio idrogeologico mediante sistemi geoelettrici sul territorio della Provincia di Forlì-Rimini ai fini della pianificazione territoriale”, Edizioni SAPIM, Forlì, 1998.
