= Umberto Pineschi =

Umberto Pineschi (born Trieste, Venezia Giulia, Italy) is a Professor Emeritus of the State Conservatory of Music "G. Rossini" of Pesaro, and Professor Emeritus of Conservatory of Music "G.B. Martini" of Bologna. He was Director of the municipal school of music "T. Mabellini" of Pistoia up to 2015.

He contributed to the strengthening of cultural exchanges between Japan and Italy, thanks to organ music education. In 2009, he was awarded the Order of the Rising Sun, Gold Rays with Neck Ribbon, by the government of Japan. He worked with Hiroshi Tsuji. He supported the International Organ Festival Of Uruguay.

== Discography ==
- Organi Storici D'Italia CD (Liuwe Tamminga, March 1999)
