= Paolo Ravaglia =

Italian clarinetist

Paolo Ravaglia is a clarinetist.

== Discography ==
=== With Alter Ego ===
- Toshio Hosokawa: Birds Fragments
- Sciarrino: Fiato
- Glass: Music in the Shape of a Square
- Salvatore Sciarrino: Esplorazione del Bianco
