= Teatro Comunale di Bologna =

Opera house in Bologna, Italy

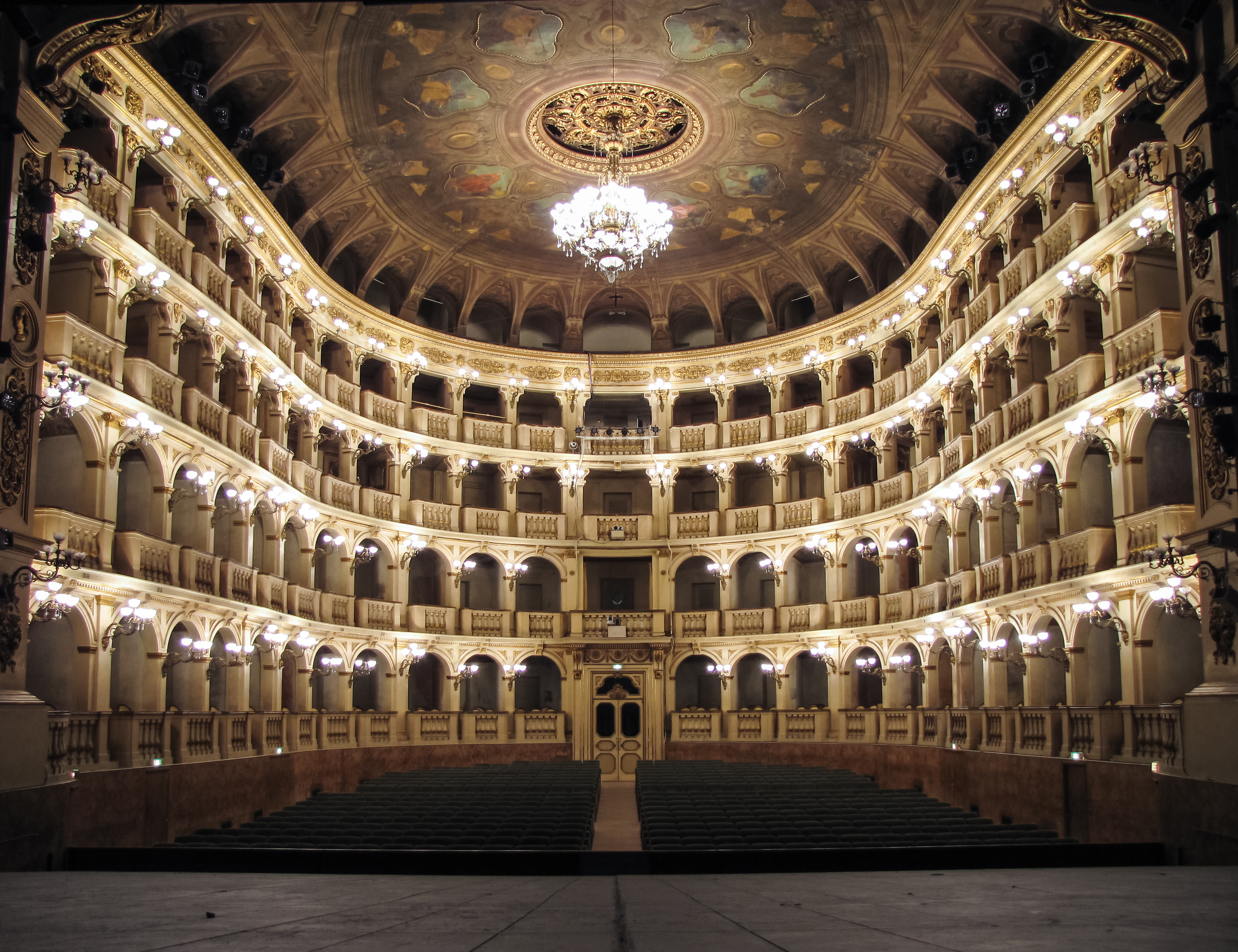
- Interior of the theatre
- Interactive map of Teatro Comunale di Bologna
- Address: Bologna; Italy
- Designation: Opera house

Construction
- Opened: 1763
- Architect: Antonio Galli Bibiena

Website
- www.tcbo.it

The Teatro Comunale di Bologna is an opera house in Bologna, Italy. Typically, it presents eight operas with six performances during its November to April season.

While there had been various theatres presenting opera in Bologna since the early 17th century, they had either fallen into disuse or burnt down. However, from the early 18th century, the Teatro Marsigli-Rossi had been presenting operatic works by popular composers of the day including Vivaldi, Gluck, and Niccolò Piccinni. The Teatro Malvezzi, built in 1651, burned down in February 1745 and this event prompted the construction of a new theatre, the Nuovo Teatro Pubblico, as the Teatro Comunale was originally called when it opened on 14 May 1763.

== Design and inauguration ==
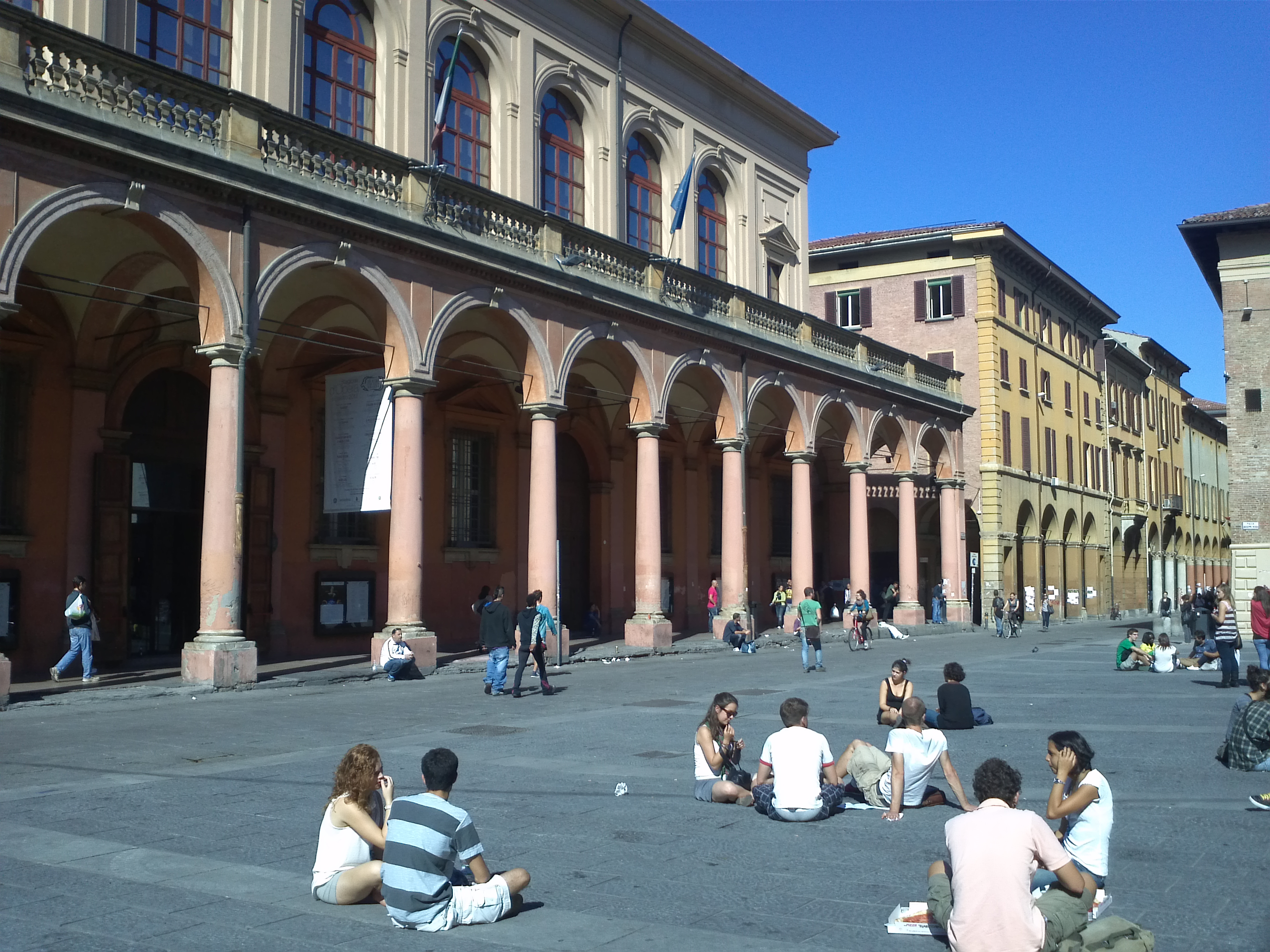
Teatro Comunale di Bologna

Despite opposition from other competitors, the architect Antonio Galli Bibiena won the theatre design contract. The theatre's inaugural performance was Gluck's Il trionfo di Clelia, an opera which Gluck had composed for the occasion. A bell-shaped auditorium consisting of four tiers of boxes plus a royal box and small gallery with a ceiling decorated as if open to the sky, was built primarily of masonry as a protection against fire. However, much work remained unfinished, the facade in particular which was not completed until 1936. Also, many of the backstage facilities which would allow for the presentations of operas were unfinished and only completed due to competition from another theatre in 1805.

It was to be the first major opera house to be constructed with public funds and owned by the municipality. Although 35 of its 99 boxes were sold for private use, the terms of ownership were also unique in that they have been described as being limited to "the right to rent in perpetuity" rather than outright ownership and control.

Various renovations were undertaken between 1818 and 1820 and also in 1853/54. After fire destroyed much of the stage area in 1931, the theatre was closed, and it did not re-open until 14 November 1935. By that date, the original bell-shaped auditorium had given way to a horseshoe-shaped one seating 1,034 people.

Over the years, the Teatro Comunale di Bolonga evolved into a central institution in the cultural life of the city. It became a training ground for ongoing or emerging Italian operatic talent, while also hosting performances and premieres by renowned composers such as Verdi, Rossini, and Donizetti.

== Associated music history ==
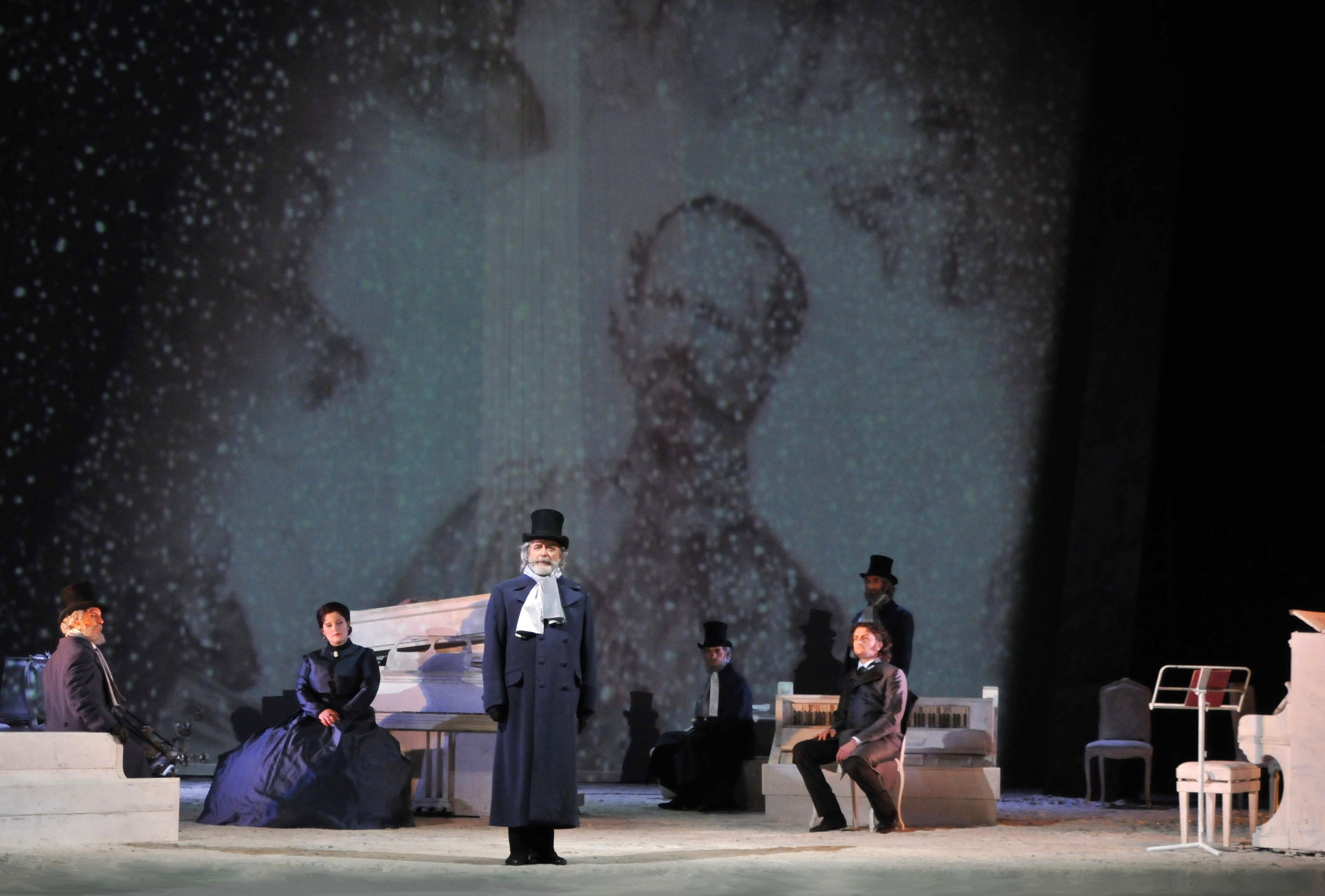
Scene from Lorenzo Ferrero's opera Risorgimento! given in 2011

The 19th century saw the presentation of twenty operas by Gioachino Rossini, while seven of Vincenzo Bellini's ten operas were presented in the 1830s. Works by Giuseppe Verdi and, later in 1871, the Italian premiere of Wagner's Lohengrin, dominated the theatre's repertoire as the century progressed. In fact, Bologna became the location for several other Wagner opera premieres in Italy, notably with the composer present for his Rienzi and the Parsifal premiere on 1 January 1914.

Another major figure associated with the Teatro Comunale from 1894 onwards was Arturo Toscanini, who conducted Verdi's Falstaff in that year and conducted with the company until the Second World War. Riccardo Nielsen was superintendent of the theatre from 1946-1950.

Premieres at the house have included Alessandro Solbiati's Il suono giallo, based on Wassily Kandinsky's experimental play The Yellow Sound on 13 June 2015.

The orchestra of the company was established on a stable foundation in 1956. Sergiu Celibidache was the first principal conductor under this new regime, from 1956 to 1973. The most recent principal conductor of the company was Michele Mariotti, from 2008 to 2018, and he also held the title of music director from 2014 to 2018.

In March 2021, Oksana Lyniv made her first guest-conducting appearance with the company, in a streamed quarantine concert without an audience. She returned for an additional guest-conducting appearance in a May 2021 concert with an audience present. In October 2021, the Teatro Comunale di Bologna announced the appointment of Lyniv as its new music director, effective January 2022, with an initial contract of 3 years. She is the first female conductor to be named music director of the company, and the first female conductor ever to be named music director of an Italian opera company.

== Conductors in leadership positions ==
- Sergiu Celibidache (1956–1973, principal conductor)
- Zoltán Peskó (1956–1973, principal conductor)
- Vladimir Delman (1980–1983, permanent conductor)
- Riccardo Chailly (1984–1993, principal conductor)
- Daniele Gatti (1997–2007, principal conductor)
- Michele Mariotti (2008–2018, principal conductor; 2014–2018, music director)
- Oksana Lyniv (2022–present, music director)
