= Saint Thomas Choir School =

Coordinates: 40.76616°N 73.98013°W

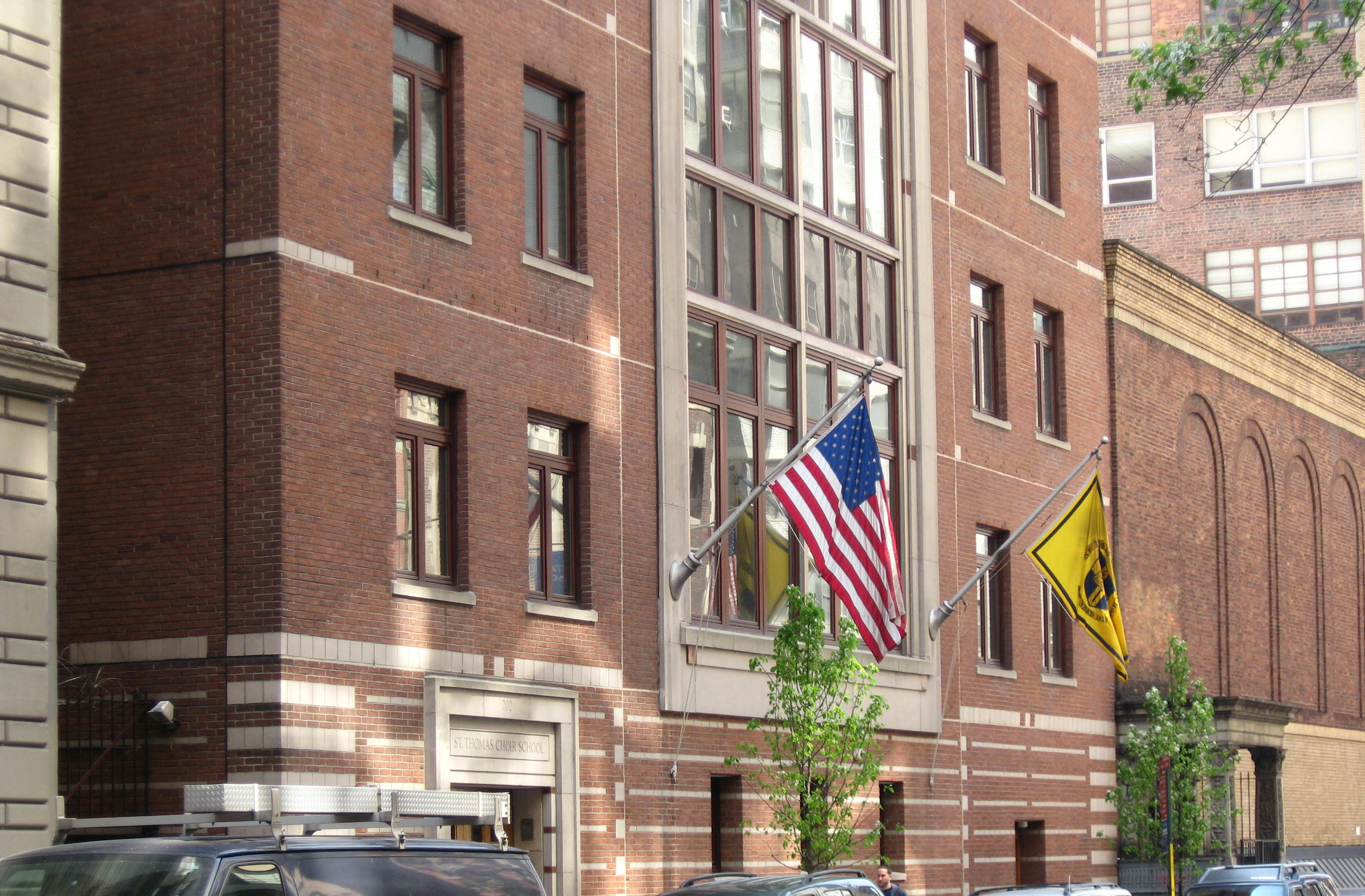

Location
- 202 West 58th Street; New York City, New York; United States

Information
- Type: Private, church-affiliated boarding school
- Motto: Cantate Domino (Sing unto the Lord)
- Religious affiliation: Episcopal
- Established: 1919
- Enrollment: 26 boys (2024–25)
- Campus: Urban
- Tuition: $22,000 (2024–25)
- Website: www.choirschool.org

Saint Thomas Choir School is an all-boys boarding school located in Manhattan, New York, dedicated to the education and training of approximately 30 choirboys from ages 8 to 14. It is one of three all-boarding, all-boys choral schools in the world (the other two being Westminster Abbey Choir School in England and Escolania de Montserrat in Spain).

The school is supervised by and receives financial support from the nearby Saint Thomas Church (Episcopal), whose choral ensemble performs music in the Anglican tradition at worship services, while offering a full concert series during the course of the school year. Starting in 2025, the school's educational programs will be operated by the Professional Children's School, a day school for child actors and performers, although the church will continue to offer music and religious instruction.

In the 2024–25 school year, the school had 26 students and 24 faculty and staff. It resides in a fifteen-story building located at 202 West 58th Street in midtown Manhattan, one block south of Central Park. Since 2005, the school has offered a summer residential Girl Chorister Course.

During the 2023–24 school year, 74% of students were on financial aid, which covered, on average, 74% of tuition.

== History ==
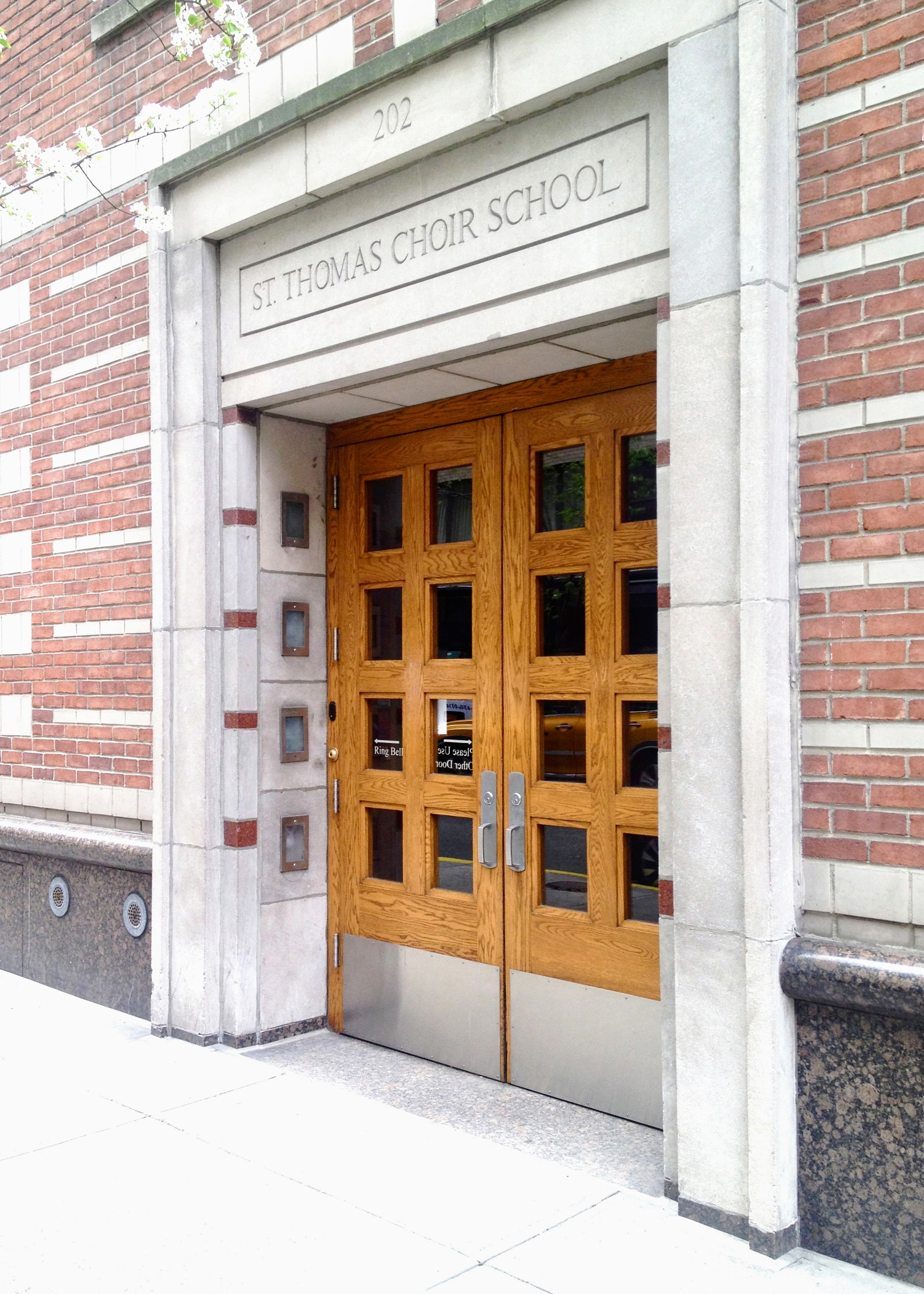
Choir School entrance

Saint Thomas Choir School was founded in 1919 by the vestry of Saint Thomas Church at the urging of English-born composer T. Tertius Noble, the church organist since 1913. The school opened on March 3, 1919 in a four-story building at 123 West 55th Street. A two-story addition, designed by the architect Thomas A. Bell and completed in 1938, expanded the school north to West 56th Street.

=== Current campus (1987–present) ===
In 1985, the church vestry transferred title to the school's land and building to property developer Fisher Brothers, who in return built a new school on a 75 foot (23 m) wide lot at 202 West 58th Street. Execution of the project required demolition of the Elysee Theater, used as a television studio since 1955, and as a theatre or cinema since 1926.

The new building opened in September 1987. Designed by the architecture firm Buttrick White & Burtis, the $18 million, 55,000-square-foot (5,100 m^{2}), steel-frame building was clad in red brick, with limestone trim and gray brick accents, rising six stories before stepping back twenty feet, then rising eight more stories to a gabled roof form containing a small chapel illuminated by a large circular window. The principal feature of the lower facade is a three-story window (suggestive of an "oriel"), framed in buff Indiana limestone with red granite accents.

=== Affiliation with the Professional Children's School ===
In March 2024, Saint Thomas Church warned that due to rising costs, it would discontinue operating the school unless it raised $50 million in endowment funds. Although the church had a $138 million endowment, it noted that much of that endowment could not be used for school purposes. Owing to the school's atypically low tuition and large scholarship program (during the 2023–24 school year, approximately 21 of the school's 28 students were on financial aid), tuition revenues accounted for around $250,000 of the school's $4 million budget.

In November, the church announced that starting in 2025, it would hand the academic program to the Professional Children's School, although the church will continue to offer music and religious instruction. The church acknowledged that several teachers and staff would likely be laid off.

== Student life ==
Students participate in a liturgical music program while studying academic subjects such as English, science, history, mathematics, Latin, French, music theory, and theology. Students also participate in an athletic program, competing against local private schools in soccer, basketball, and track.

Students are admitted on a rolling basis. The school holds auditions three times a year for boys entering the third, fourth, and fifth grades. Third grade students must live close enough to the school to go home every weekend and return on Sunday evening, a requirement waived for fourth and fifth grade students.

== Other opportunities ==
The school offers employment to students taking a year off between high school and college. They assist in classroom and sports programs, and help in the preparation of the choristers' instrumental practice. Most gap students have a choral background and an understanding of the daily routine and needs of a choir school. Acceptance is competitive.

== Saint Thomas Choir ==
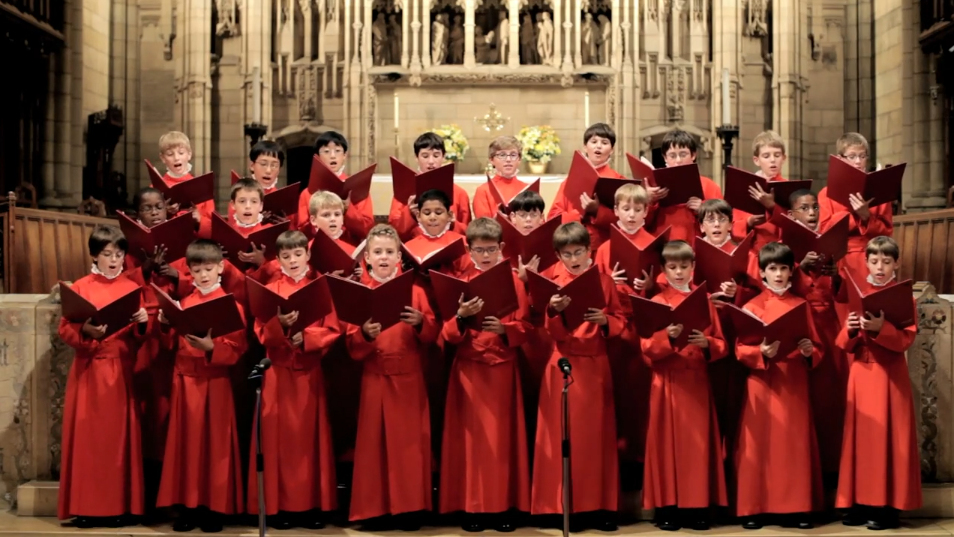
Choirboys singing in St. Thomas in 2011

Directed since 2019 by Jeremy Filsell, the choir performs regularly with the period instrument ensemble Concert Royal, and with the Orchestra of St. Luke's, as part of its own concert series. The choir's primary raison d'être, however, is to provide music for five choral services each week at Saint Thomas Church. Whereas the men of the Saint Thomas Choir are professional singers, the boy choristers are students from the Saint Thomas Choir School.

In addition to annual performances of Handel's Messiah, concerts at Saint Thomas Church have included requiems by Fauré, Brahms, Mozart, Duruflé, and Howells; Bach's Passions and Mass in B Minor; the Monteverdi Vespers of 1610; a Henry Purcell anniversary concert; Rachmaninoff Vespers; the U.S. premiere of John Tavener's Mass; a concert of American composers featuring works by Leonard Bernstein and Aaron Copland; a composition by Saint Thomas chorister Daniel Castellanos; the world premiere of Scott Eyerly's Spires; and a concert of works by Benjamin Britten.

The choir has toured throughout the U.S. and Europe, performing at Westminster Abbey and St. Paul's Cathedral in London; Kings College, Cambridge; Windsor Castle; Edinburgh; St. Albans; and at the Aldeburgh Festival. In 2004, the choir toured Italy and performed at a Papal Mass at the Vatican. In 2007, the choir performed Bach's Saint Matthew Passion for the opening concert of the Mexico Festival in Mexico City as well as at Saint Thomas Church. In February 2012, the boys of the choir traveled to Germany to give the premiere of Lera Auerbach's Dresden Requiem with the Dresden Staatskapelle at the Frauenkirche and at the Semperoper. Later in 2012, the choir performed in the Thomaskirche at the Bachfest Leipzig, a highlight of their tour to Germany and Copenhagen.

== Head staff ==
Headmasters of the Choir School

- Clarence Jack Smith, 1919
- Raymond Wallace Gauger, 1920–1922
- Herbert H. Hannan, 1923–1925
- Clair J. Smith, 1926–1927
- Charles Mead Benham, 1928–1942
- The Rev. James O. Carson Jr, 1943–1944
- Leon D. Phillips, 1945–1949
- Henry B. Roney Jr, 1950–1955
- Robert Porter, 1955–1966
- Gordon H. Clem, 1967–1995
- Murray Lawrence, 1995–1997
- Gordon Roland-Adams, 1997–2004
- The Rev. Charles Wallace, 2004–2019
- Amalia Francisco (Interim), 2020–2021
- Christopher Seeley, 2021–2025

Organists and Choirmasters

- T. Tertius Noble, 1913–1940
- T. Frederick Candlyn, 1940–1954
- William Self, 1954–1971
- Gerre Hancock, 1971–2004

Organists and Directors of Music

- John Scott, 2004–2015
- Daniel Hyde, 2016–2019
- Jeremy Filsell, 2019–2025
- Richard Tanner, 2025–Present

== Notable alumni ==
- Kit Culkin, actor
- John Hine Mundy, British-American medievalist, professor at Columbia University
- Steve Sandvoss, actor
- Gunther Schuller, jazz and classical composer
- Dave Noll, creator of Chopped
- Chris Wylde, actor

== See also ==
- Escolania de Montserrat, a boarding school for choristers in Spain
- Westminster Abbey Choir School, another school for choristers in England
- Saint Thomas Church (Manhattan)
