= Christopher Dearnley =

English cathedral organist (1930–2000)

Christopher Hugh Dearnley LVO (11 February 1930 – 15 December 2000) was an English cathedral organist, who served in Salisbury Cathedral and St Paul's Cathedral.

== Background ==
Christopher Hugh Dearnley was born on 11 February 1930 in Wolverhampton. He was educated at Cranleigh School.

He was organ scholar at Worcester College, Oxford, from 1948 to 1952.

From 1954 to 1968 he was engaged at Salisbury Cathedral, as assistant organist and (in 1957) organist. He also was conductor of the Salisbury Medical and Orchestral Societies, and was joint conductor of the annual Southern Cathedrals Festival (a collaboration between the Salisbury, Chichester, and Winchester cathedrals).

Whilst organist at St Paul's he would greatly amuse the choristers by turning up for choir practice in his plus fours which he would also wear whilst cycling around the City of London early in the mornings doing a (presumably one of his children's) paper round.

In 1963 he headed the faculty for the Wa-Li-Ro Choir School in Put-in-Bay, Ohio, along with Leo Sowerby and Paul Beymer.

On his retirement from St Paul's Cathedral, he was appointed LVO in the 1990 Queen's Birthday Honours list.

Dearnley was also president of the Incorporated Association of Organists (IAO), 1968–1971, and chairman of the Friends of Cathedral Music, 1971–1989. The Archbishop of Canterbury awarded him a Lambeth doctorate of music in 1987 and he was made a fellow of the Royal School of Church Music in 1995.

Dearnley and his wife, Bridget, migrated to Australia in 1990. Both committed nudists, their first stop in Australia was a nudist camp near Wadong, Victoria.

While in Australia, Dearnley undertook locums as director of music at Christ Church St Laurence (1990), St David's Cathedral, Hobart (1991), Trinity College at the University of Melbourne (1992–1993), St George's Cathedral, Perth (1993–1994), St Andrew's Cathedral, Sydney (1995), and Christ Church Cathedral, Newcastle (1996–1997). He also became patron of the Organ Historical Trust of Australia in 1991.

He also wrote and edited several studies and histories of English church music, including Treasury of English church music, Volume 3 (1650–1760) (1965). He was one of the editors of The New English Hymnal.

He died in Australia on 15 December 2000.

== Career ==
Assistant organist of:

- Salisbury Cathedral 1954 – 1957

Organist of:

- Salisbury Cathedral 1957 – 1968
- St Paul's Cathedral 1968 – 1990

Church of England titles
Preceded by Douglas Guest	Organist and Master of the Choristers of Salisbury Cathedral; 1957–1968	Succeeded by Richard Seal
Preceded by John Dykes Bower	Organist and Master of the Choristers of St Paul's Cathedral; 1968–1990	Succeeded by John Scott
