= Huddersfield Town Hall =

Municipal building in Huddersfield, West Yorkshire, England

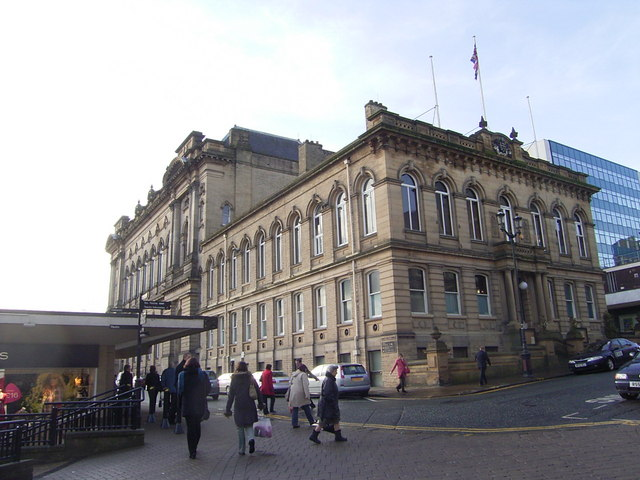
- Huddersfield Town Hall at the northern (Ramsden Street) end

- Shown in West Yorkshire
- 53.6439°N 1.7826°W
- Location: Huddersfield

History
- Built: 1881

Site notes
- Architect: John Henry Abbey
- Architectural style: Classical style

Listed Building – Grade II
- Designated: 29 September 1978
- Reference no.: 1231723

Huddersfield Town Hall is a municipal facility in Huddersfield, West Yorkshire, England. It is a Grade II listed building.

== History ==
The building was commissioned to replace the offices of the Huddersfield Improvement Commissioners who had initially been based in offices in South Parade, since demolished, from 1848 and then in the Philosophical Hall on Ramsden Street (Note: The Philosophical Hall became the Theatre Royal and was rebuilt, after being burnt down in February 1880; it was finally demolished because of its "dilapidated condition" in 1961.) from 1859. The new building, which was designed by John Henry Abbey in the Classical style, was completed in two stages; the stone was from Crosland Moor and the carving was sculpted by Thomas Stocks of Berry Brow.

The northern part of the building, which included the municipal offices, was officially opened by Alderman Joseph Woodhead, the mayor, on 26 June 1878. The northern part was designed with a large porch, flanked by two columns with parapet above. The southern part, which included the concert hall and the magistrates' court, was opened by Alderman Thomas Denham, the then-mayor, in October 1881. The southern part of the building was given large Corinthian order columns at the first floor level on the exterior of the building.

Sir Charles Hallé conducted the Huddersfield Choral Society at the official opening in October 1881. The concert organ, which was built by Henry Willis & Sons and originally installed in the Albert Hall in Newport, Wales, was bought on the advice of Sir Walter Parratt who played the new organ at the opening concert recital.

The town hall was the meeting place of Huddersfield Municipal Borough which secured county borough status in 1889. In April 1889 the first annual "Mrs Sunderland Music Festival" took place at Huddersfield Town Hall with the retired soprano Susan Sunderland presenting the prizes to the winners. The music festival was subsequently extended such that it occupied up to nine days. The town hall continued to be used as a public venue and concert performers included the contralto singer, Kathleen Ferrier, who made an appearance on 21 December 1945. Princess Elizabeth and the Duke of Edinburgh visited the town hall and waved to the crowd from the balcony on 26 July 1949.

After the county borough was abolished under the Local Government Act 1972 in 1974, it became the headquarters of the Kirklees Council. Following the most recent restoration of the organ in 1997, the leading organist Gordon Stewart attended and played Dance Suite for organ, which had been specially written by the composer Noel Rawsthorne for the re-opening of the concert hall.

== See also ==
- Listed buildings in Huddersfield (Newsome Ward - central area)
