= Richard Tanner (organist) =

English organist

- Born: Richard James Tanner; England
- Education: Radley College; Royal Academy of Music; Exeter College, Oxford (BM)
- Occupations: organist; choir director; conductor
- Years active: 1993–present
- Honours: Fellow of the Royal College of Organists

Richard James Tanner FRCO is an English organist, choir director and conductor who was appointed director of music at Saint Thomas Church, Fifth Avenue, in New York City in September 2025, having previously held similar roles at Rugby School and Blackburn Cathedral in the United Kingdom.

== Early life and education ==
Tanner was a chorister at St Paul's Cathedral in London from the age of 8, and received his first organ lessons with John Scott, who, like Tanner, later became director of music at St Thomas Church in New York. He continued his organ studies at Radley College and the Royal Academy of Music, and was an organ scholar at Exeter College, Oxford, where he was awarded a Bachelor of Music degree.

== Career ==
After leaving Oxford, Tanner spent a year as organ scholar at St Albans Cathedral before serving as organist and director of music at All Saints' Church, Northampton (1993−1998), where he expanded the boys' choir, established a girls' choir and led the choirs on international tours, including to the United States.

From 1998 to 2011, he was organist and director of music at Blackburn Cathedral, and for 18 months thereafter was in charge of music at the chapel of Trinity Laban Conservatoire of Music and Dance in London, which on several occasions was broadcast on BBC Radio, including for the Choral Evensong programme. He also conducted the Trinity Laban choir at the London Festival of Contemporary Church Music.

In 2012 Tanner became director of music at Rugby School, whose choir he took on international tours to Europe, Asia and North America and conducted at the opening ceremony of the Rugby World Cup at Twickenham Stadium in 2025. In 2017 and 2022 choristers from the school won the BBC Young Chorister of the Year competition. Tanner left the school in 2025 to become director of music at Saint Thomas Church on Fifth Avenue, New York City.

Tanner's other work has included playing for the BBC worship programme The Daily Service and conducting orchestras around the world, including at Carnegie Hall in New York. He has released several recordings, including La Nativité du Seigneur by Olivier Messiaen, the Requiem and Organ Concerto by David Briggs and The Manchester Carols by Carol Ann Duffy and Sasha Johnson Manning.

== Awards and recognition ==
Tanner became a Fellow of the Royal College of Organists in 1997 and was elected to the college's trustee council in 2025. He was awarded an honorary fellowship by the Guild of Church Musicians in 2008 and was made an Associate of the Royal Academy of Music in 2010. He is also a trustee of the Rodolfus Choral Foundation.

== Personal life ==
Tanner is married to Philippa Hyde, a soprano, with whom he has two sons, including the organist and composer Benedict Tanner.

Preceded by Gordon Stewart	Organist and Master of the Choristers, Blackburn Cathedral; 1988−2011	Succeeded by Samuel Hudson
Preceded by Jeremy Filsell	Organist and Director of Music, Saint Thomas Church, New York; 2025–present	Succeeded by Incumbent
