= Saint Thomas Church (Manhattan) =

Church in Manhattan, New York

St. Thomas Church, Fifth Avenue
- Saint Thomas Church in the City of New York
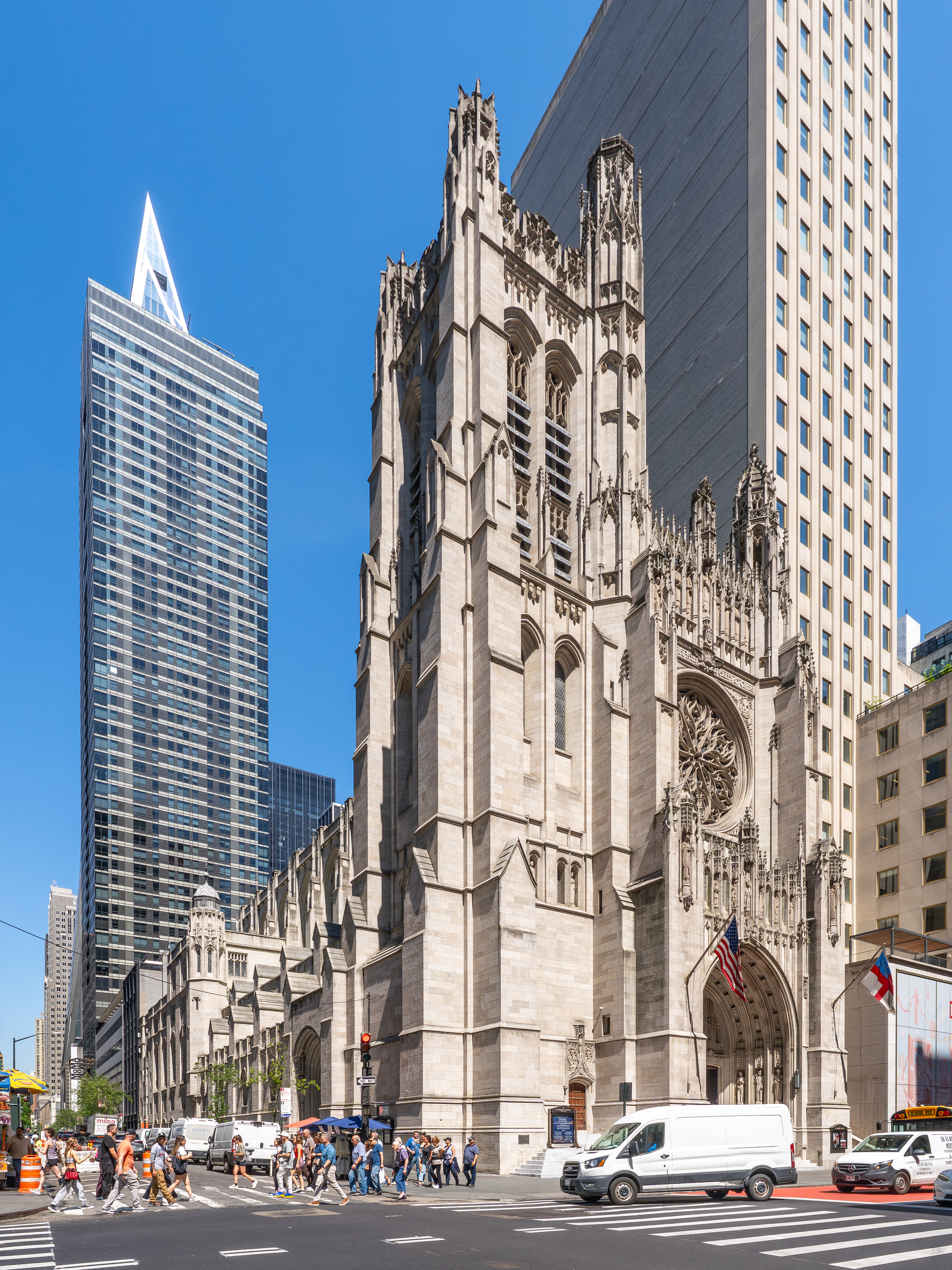
- St. Thomas Church, Fifth Avenue
- Location: 53rd Street and Fifth Avenue; Manhattan, New York City
- Country: United States
- Denomination: Episcopal Church
- Churchmanship: Anglo-Catholic
- Website: saintthomaschurch.org

History
- Founded: 1823; 203 years ago
- Dedication: St. Thomas
- Consecrated: April 25, 1916

Architecture
- Architect: Ralph Adams Cram
- Architectural type: Church
- Style: Gothic Revival
- Completed: 1914
- Construction cost: $1,171,906.44 (equivalent to $37,668,421 in 2025)

Specifications
- Length: 214 feet (65 m)
- Width: 100 feet (30 m)
- Height: 95 feet (29 m)
- Materials: Kentucky limestone, Kentucky sandstone

Administration
- Province: Province II
- Diocese: New York

Clergy
- Bishop: Matthew Heyd
- Rector: Carl F. Turner
- Priests: Matthew Moretz; Alison Turner; Mark Schultz; Juyoung Prisca Lee-Pae; Luigi Gioia; Preston Gonzalez-Grissom
- St. Thomas Church and Parish House
- U.S. National Register of Historic Places
- New York State Register of Historic Places
- New York City Landmark
- Location within New York City Location within New York Location within the United States
- Location: 1–3 W. 53rd St. Manhattan, New York City
- Coordinates: 40°45′39″N 73°58′34″W
- Built: 1909
- Architect: Cram, Goodhue & Ferguson
- Architectural style: Late Gothic Revival
- NRHP reference No.: 80002722
- NYSRHP No.: 06101.000442
- NYCL No.: 0260

Significant dates
- Added to NRHP: April 9, 1980
- Designated NYSRHP: June 23, 1980
- Designated NYCL: October 19, 1966

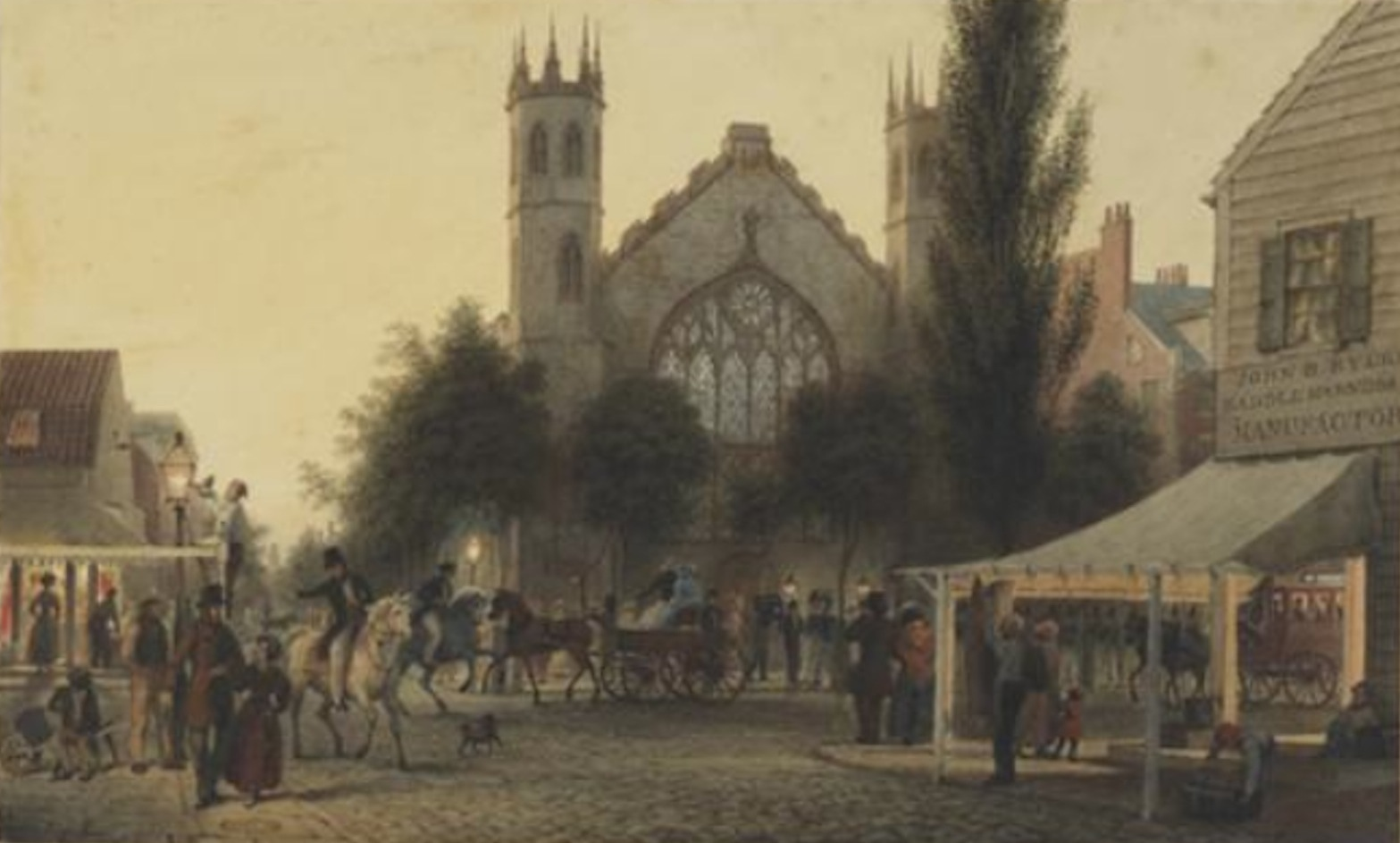
A painting by George Harvey (1801–1878) entitled Nightfall, St. Thomas Church, Broadway, New York (c. 1837) currently in the collection of the Museum of the City of New York, shows the first Saint Thomas Church on the corner of Broadway and Houston Street

Saint Thomas Church is an Episcopal parish church of the Episcopal Diocese of New York at 53rd Street and Fifth Avenue in Midtown Manhattan, New York City. Also known as Saint Thomas Church Fifth Avenue or Saint Thomas Church in the City of New York, the parish was incorporated on January 9, 1824. The current structure, the congregation's fourth church, was designed by the architects Ralph Adams Cram and Bertram Grosvenor Goodhue in the French High Gothic Revival style and completed in 1914. The church reported 2,753 members in 2015 and 2,875 members in 2023. Plate and pledge income reported for the congregation in 2024 was $2,435,735 with average Sunday attendance (ASA) of 478 persons.

In 2020, following a gift from the family trust of the late John and Mary Alyce Merrow, a camera system with a dozen 360-degree-rotating cameras was installed. Online attendance has remained significant; during Advent and Christmas, 2022, on-line participation was 38,000 with an average attendance of 25 minutes.

The church is home to the Saint Thomas Choir of Men and Boys, a choral ensemble comprising men and boys which performs music of the Anglican tradition at worship services and offers a full concert series during the course of the year. The men of the Saint Thomas Choir are professional singers and the boys are students enrolled at the Saint Thomas Choir School, the only church-affiliated residential choir school in the United States, where the choristers make up the whole student body. Only three such schools remain in the world currently; the two Anglican Choir Schools are Saint Thomas Choir School and Westminster Abbey Choir School in the United Kingdom.

== History ==
=== Broadway and Houston Street ===
On October 12, 1823, members of three Episcopal parishes in Lower Manhattan collaborated to organize a new episcopal church in New York. These included William Backhouse Astor, a wealthy Manhattan landowner; Charles King, later president of Columbia University; and jurist William Beach Lawrence. The congregation came from Grace Church, Trinity Church, and St. George's Church.

Saint Thomas Church was incorporated on January 9, 1824, and the cornerstone of the new church building laid in July 1824 at the northwest corner of Broadway and Houston Street. The first church edifice opened in 1826 and was described as "the best specimen of Gothic in the city." The location was the northern extent of developed settlement in Manhattan during the early 19th century. It was designed in a Gothic Revival style by architect Joseph R. Brady and John McVickar, professor of moral philosophy at Columbia College (now Columbia University). The church was enlarged and remodeled in 1844 to accommodate a growing congregation.

The first Saint Thomas's Church was destroyed by fire on March 2, 1851. The congregation built a new church at the same location, completed in 1852. The character of the neighborhood at the corner of Broadway and Houston, the southeastern corner of Greenwich Village, broadly speaking, had "degenerated into anchorage for cheap dance halls and 'concert saloons'" by the 1860s. This led to the congregation seeking to relocate.

=== Move to midtown ===
A third church was built from 1865 to 1870 at the corner of 53rd Street and Fifth Avenue based upon a design by Richard Upjohn and his son Richard Michell Upjohn. The cornerstone for the new church was laid on October 14, 1868. Two years later, on October 6, 1870, the congregation moved into its new home. This structure, in a neighborhood at the time dominated by the mansions of Manhattan's upper class, featured a prominent 260-foot (79 m) high tower and a bas-relief reredos by Augustus Saint-Gaudens and murals by John LaFarge. Though the new Saint Thomas's was a parish church, its location and design evoked that of a cathedral.

The third building was also the site of many high society weddings and funerals, including that of Consuelo Vanderbilt to Charles Spencer-Churchill, 9th Duke of Marlborough, the first cousin of Winston Churchill. This structure was destroyed by fire on August 8, 1905. Only the tower remained from the third church. The congregation built a 1,200-seat chapel on the rest of the site.

=== Current church ===
The fourth and current church, designed in 1906, was built from 1911 to 1913, on the same site as the third church. It was built to a design by Ralph Adams Cram and Bertram Grosvenor Goodhue of the architectural firm of Cram, Goodhue and Ferguson. The cornerstone was laid on November 21, 1911, and the new building opened to congregants on October 4, 1913. It was consecrated on April 25, 1916. The design by Cram and Goodhue won an architectural competition to build the new Saint Thomas Church, winning over entries by George Browne Post and Robert W. Gibson.

The 1906 San Francisco earthquake had so shocked the church's rector, the Rev. Ernest M. Stires, that he rushed the accumulated balance in his parish's building fund to aid the stricken city. The public responded in kind to his generosity with unsolicited gifts that more than replenished the fund.

Cram and Goodhue are also noted for having designed Saint Bartholomew's Church on Park Avenue and East 50th Street, the Cathedral of St. John the Divine on Amsterdam Avenue and West 110th Street, the chapel and a large portion of the campus at the United States Military Academy in West Point, New York, the Princeton University Chapel at Princeton University and the Rockefeller Chapel at the University of Chicago.

==== 21st century ====
In the wake of the September 11 attacks in 2001, Saint Thomas Church reached out to the British expatriate community in recognition of its Anglican heritage. This culminated in an interfaith service held at the church on September 20, 2001. The service was addressed by Prime Minister Tony Blair and broadcast live in its entirety throughout the United Kingdom. On October 28, 2002, the rector of Saint Thomas Church, Andrew C. Mead, was made an honorary Officer of the Order of the British Empire (OBE) by Queen Elizabeth II. The honor was conferred at a ceremony at the British Embassy in Washington, D.C.

In October 2023 Saint Thomas Church commemorated the bicentennial of its founding in 1823, with an exhibition, lectures and special services. The Assistant Bishop of New York, the Rt. Rev. Mary Glasspool, and the Sub-Dean of the Chapel Royal, Paul Wright, preached in celebration of the anniversary. The following year, in May 2024, the 100th anniversary of the twinning of the cities of New York City and York in England was marked with special services attended by the Presiding Bishop of the Episcopal Church, the Most Rev. Michael Curry, the Archbishop of York, Stephen Cottrell, the Mayor of New York City, Eric Adams, the Lord Mayor of York, Chris Cullwick, the Dean of York, the Very Rev. Dominic Barrington, and the British Consul General in New York, Hannah Young.

In 2025, the development firm Extell Development Company agreed to pay the congregation $36 million for 123,000 square feet (11,400 m^{2}) of the site's unused development rights.

== Rectors ==
	Rector	Years as Rector
1.	Cornelius Roosevelt Duffie	1824–1827
2.	George Upfold	1827–1831
3.	Francis Lister Hawks	1831–1843
4.	Henry John Whitehouse	1844–1851
5.	Edmund Neville	1852–1856
6.	William Ferdinand Morgan	1857–1888
7.	John Wesley Brown	1888–1900
8.	Ernest Milmore Stires	1901–1925
9.	Roelif Hasbrouck Brooks	1926–1954
10.	Frederick Myers Morris	1954–1972
11.	John Gerald Barton Andrew	1972–1996
12.	Andrew Craig Mead	1996–2014
13.	Carl Francis Turner	2014–present

== Architecture ==
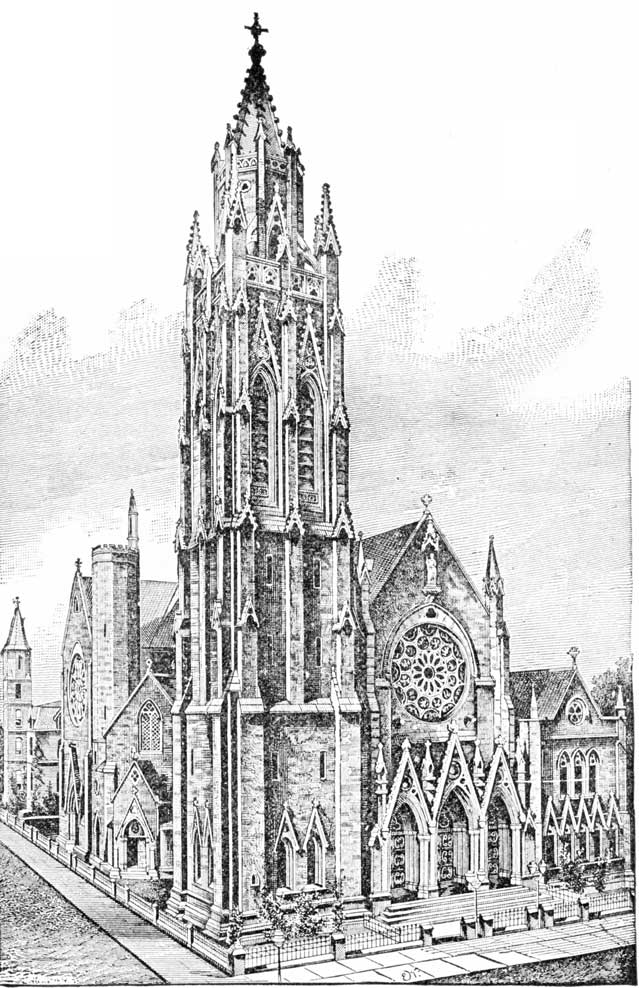
Saint Thomas Church c. 1889 (third church)

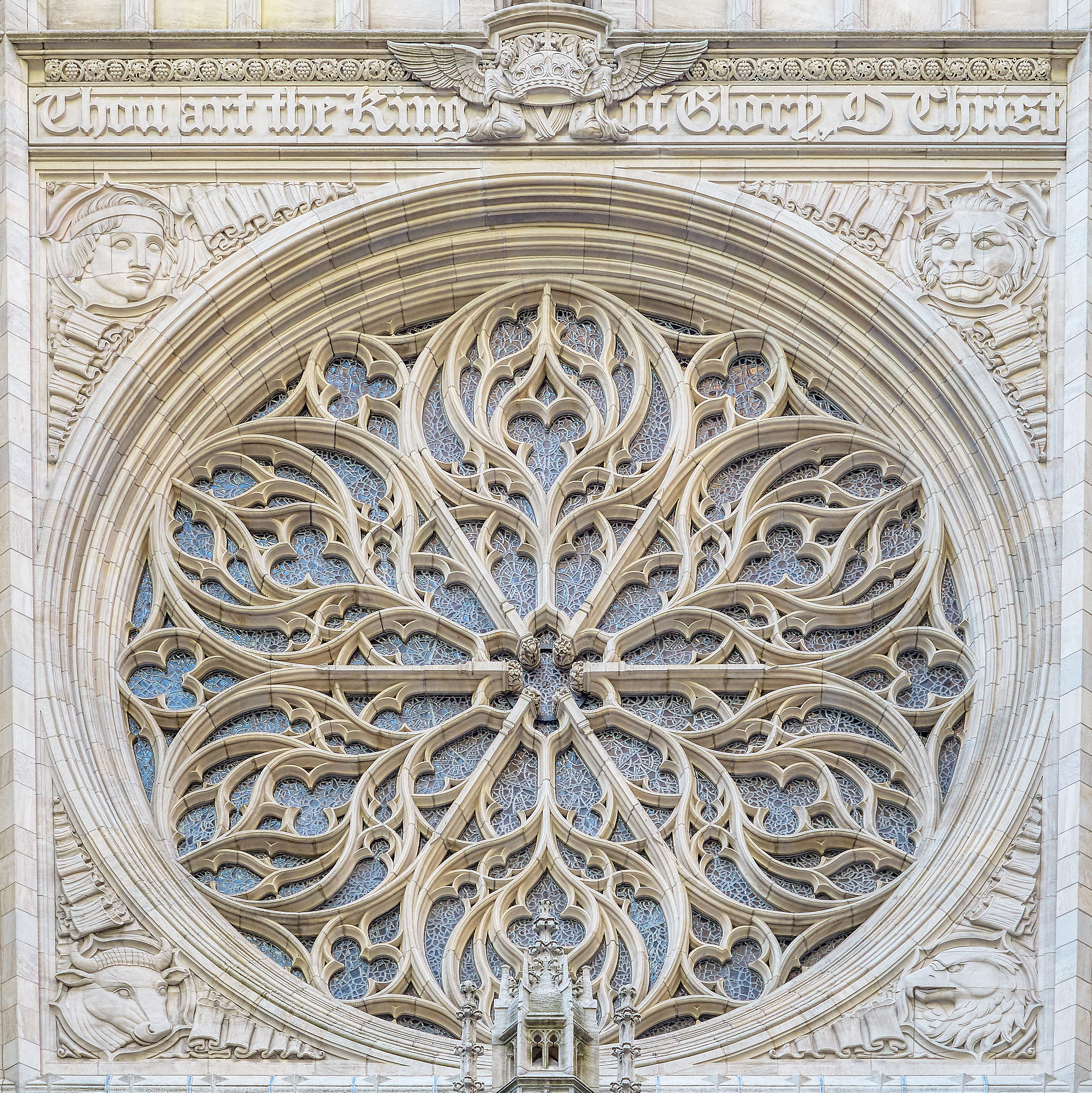
Flamboyant limestone rose window.

The present church, a New York City designated landmark, was designed by a partnership of Ralph Adams Cram and Bertram Grosvenor Goodhue. Lee Lawrie designed the sculptures and decorations. It measures 214 feet (65 m) long and 100 feet (30 m) wide. The church building rises 95 feet (29 m).

=== Facade ===
Saint Thomas Church has plain ashlar limestone exterior surfaces in the French High Gothic style. The church's asymmetrical main elevation on Fifth Avenue is divided into three sections, reflecting the interior divisions. The nave is slightly off-center, with a wide chantry to the south and a narrow aisle to the north.

==== Main entrance ====
The main entrance, which leads to the nave, is flanked by large buttresses. The entrance portal contains niches with sculptures. The center of the portal is divided vertically by a trumeau with a sculpture depicting Thomas the Apostle. There are three sculptures on each side, depicting six of the apostles. These sculptures, part of the original plan, were not installed until 1963. There are gilded low relief panels above the main doors, which depict the congregation's four buildings.

Above the portal are more sculptures, interspersed with small windows. These depict the six remaining apostles as well as Mary Magdalene and Martha. Decorative archivolts above these niches and windows contain depictions of Thomas the Apostle's life, the sacraments, and the gifts of the holy spirit. These in turn are topped by more figures of saints. The entrance is topped by a large rose window with a tetramorph in low relief.

==== Other sections ====
To the left (south) of the main entrance, there is a square tower at the southeast corner of the church, facing Fifth Avenue and 53rd Street. The tower has a simpler design than the main entrance, with band courses and other horizontal design features that relate to the main entrance's design. At the top is a bell tower, which was cited in 1940 as having 25 chimes.

To the right (north) of the main entrance is a narrow section of wall, leading to the north aisle. The northern entrance contains a depiction of Ernest M. Stires holding a model of the current church. Stires was the rector when the church was completed.

The southern elevation contains five bays, which are separated by buttresses. Next to the square tower, in the easternmost bay, is an entrance to the chantry. Above the entrance there are motifs relating to the sanctity of marriage. The other bays contain stained glass windows in the chantry. To the west is the gallery, which contains five bays of tripartite windows made of stained glass. The three center bays of the gallery contain an arcade of three arched doorways. The buttresses contain sculptures of ancient leaders and philosophers. Above the four windows in the chantry and the five windows in the south gallery are nine recessed clerestory windows, illuminating the top of the nave.

To the west of the main church is the parish house, which is a separate structure. The parish house is five stories tall and contains an oriel window in its eastern bay, separating it from the rest of the church. The entrance to the parish house is on 53rd Street; it was originally at the rear of the gallery arcade. The roof of the parish house is covered in lead.

==== Stained glass ====
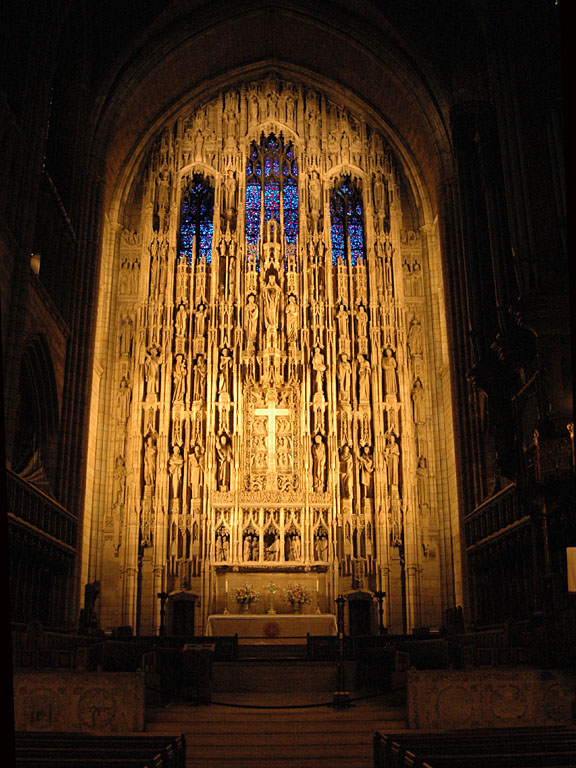
The high altar and reredos of Saint Thomas Church designed by architect Bertram Grosvenor Goodhue (1869–1924) and sculptor Lee Lawrie (1877–1963)

The first stained glass window placed in the fourth Saint Thomas Church structure was designed by Nicola D'Ascenzo, an Italian-born American stained glass artist. The window was designed in 1926 and completed and installed in 1927. The last window, designed and installed in 1974, came from the Willet Stained Glass Studios, headed by E. Crosby Willet and founded by William Willet. Both those studios were located in Philadelphia, Pennsylvania, at the time of the fabrication of their windows for Saint Thomas Church.

James Powell & Sons (Whitefriars), Ltd, of London, secured a contract for the remaining windows in the present church structure, including all except one of the clerestory windows. Each window measures 32 feet (9.8 m) tall and 18 feet (5.5 m) wide and depict biblical figures interacting with notable American bishops. The windows for the present structure were designed beginning in 1929 by English stained glass artist James Humphries Hogan, who also the main American sales agent for the firm. He labored from 1926 to 1928 to acquire the commission for the Saint Thomas Church windows. Hogan's son, Edmond Humphries Hogan, designed some of the windows, including those in the Rector's office. The actual fabrication and installation of the Powell & Sons windows was not completed until 1970, but most of the windows were designed by Hogan before his death in 1948. Five windows were designed and completed after his death: one in 1950, one in 1954, two in 1959, and one in 1970. Those windows were the work of another Powell & Sons artist, Edward Liddall Armitage.

In 2007, conservation began in earnest on all the stained glass windows in the present structure. It took ten years and $20 million to renew the splendor of 33 windows, with their 9 million pieces of glass. The restoration was completed in February 2017.

=== Interior ===
The interior surfaces are made of sandstone. Saint Thomas Church is characterized by a high main arcade, an open triforium, and a clerestory. The narthex, just inside the main portal, was originally decorated with symbols of four classical elements, four seasons of the year, and four angels. After World War II, these were replaced with motifs that represented peace and honored those who were killed in the war. These motifs include mosaics on the floors as well as an altar at the north end. The narthex and nave were initially separated by an oak screen, which was replaced in 1961 by glass.

At the front of the nave is a parapet with eight mosaics. The four mosaics on the left depict symbols of the church, while those on the right depict major events in the history of the United States. There is also an octagonal pulpit made of oak. The pulpit is surrounded by statues of preachers. Above it is a sounding board depicting prophecies of the Old Testament. The lectern of the pulpit is also inlaid in wood. Ornate wooden carving is placed around the rest of the chancel, including on the choir stalls, altar rail, and kneeling rail. The altar rail also has a bronze grill flanked by oak carvings of angels. There is an organ screen that depicts notable organists.

The elaborate reredos, gifted by the family of Harris C. Fahnestock, was designed by Goodhue and Lawrie and executed by the Ardolino Brothers. The reredos contains niches with depictions of saints, prophets, reformers, and Christian dignitaries. It is 80 feet (24 m) high, covering the west wall of the chancel, and consists of more than 60 stone figures relating to the discovery of Thomas the Apostle.

The church's superstructure is built of stone and originally did not contain any steel reinforcement. This contrasted with many other buildings from the early 20th century, which tended to be steel-framed. The architects believed that, if the church was designed in the Gothic style, then its superstructure had to be built the same way. In 1925, eleven years after completion, the north wall of the church was found to be bulging dangerously and hidden steelwork added. The construction of the New York City Subway's 53rd Street Line in the 1930s prompted additional steel under the altar and massive reredos as a precaution.

==== Acoustics ====
The architects realized that the sound associated with a Gothic look would not work for a more sermon-focused Protestant service. Wallace Sabine, founder of the field of architectural acoustics, was hired to reduce reverberation in order to make the sermon more intelligible. Sabine avoided changing the church's aesthetic by hanging panels and drapes to absorb sound. Instead he worked with Rafael Guastavino Jr. to create Rumford tile, a ceramic tile with porous surfaces that absorb sound. The church was among the first to be acoustically engineered for environmental control.

== Worship ==
The style of worship at Saint Thomas Church has varied greatly over the history of the parish. Beginning with the rectorship of John Andrew in 1972, however, it has informally followed the Anglo-Catholic or high-church tradition within the Episcopal Church that developed out of the Oxford Movement. This was further developed under the rectorship of Andrew Mead. Sunday services include Low Mass, High Mass, and Evensong, and Solemn Mass on Christmas, Easter and major feast days. Special liturgies and processions are held for Advent, Epiphany, Candlemas and Holy Week. The Litany is sung in procession in Advent and Lent. For masses at the High Altar, the Church uses a variation on the three traditional sacred ministers ad orientem, however as with many other Anglo-Catholic parishes that do not look to Tridentine Rome for liturgical cues, many of the unique traditional roles of sacred ministers are currently in use—the Deacon reads the Gospel and the Subdeacon reads the Epistle. The choir of men and boys sing most Sundays in term time and, if there are no visiting choirs during the school vacation, the gentlemen of the choir sing the services. The church uses traditional language for many of its services on Sundays and weekdays and King James Version of the Bible is used at Sunday choral services and at Choral Evensong and Solemn Mass on feast days during the week. Rite II of the BCP 1979 is used for the 12:10 pm Mass Mondays to Saturdays. Choral Evensong uses the form found in the Church of England BCP of 1662. In Lent 2015 Shrine Prayers were started at the image of Our Lady of Fifth Avenue and intercessions are offered at noon after the Angelus Mondays to Saturdays; these intercessions may be left in the church or submitted online via the church website, and many prayer requests come from around the world every week. Confessions are heard each Saturday from 11:00–11:45 am. Since 2021, the 9 am Sunday Mass has become a children and family focused service, using Rite II and ad populum altar placed in the Chancel, but there are still acolytes and incense is used. A robed children's outreach choir called the Noble Singers and composed of local girls and boys sings at the 9 am service and the homily is designed for the children. On the second Sunday of each month, a Sunday Mass is offered in Korean. The church is open every day of the year.

== Music ==
=== Choir of Men and Boys ===
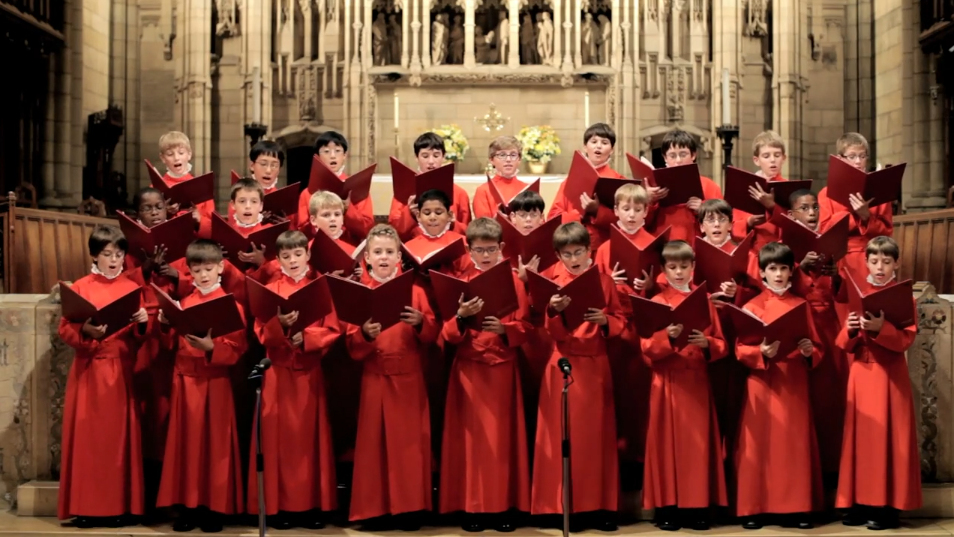
Boy choristers of the choir performing in the church

Music is an important component of worship and liturgy at Saint Thomas Church. It follows in the Anglican tradition of the all-male choral ensemble. The boy choristers reside at Saint Thomas Choir School.

The choir's primary function is to provide music for five services each week, as well as an annual concert series sponsored by the church. In addition, the choir has toured throughout North America and Europe, performing at venues such as the Lincoln Center, Westminster Abbey, and the Vatican. They have sung alongside artists such as Jessye Norman and Plácido Domingo, and gave the world-premiere performance of Andrew Lloyd Webber's Requiem, which was televised internationally by the BBC. The choir was featured in a recording of Carly Simon's "Let the River Run", and has released a number of its own CDs.

Choral services are occasionally recorded for broadcast on the radio, most recently in November 2024 when Evensong and Matins were recorded for BBC Radio 3 and BBC Radio 4, respectively.

In January 2025 plans were announced to expand the church's musical program with the formation of a girls' choir and a choir of men and women.

=== Organs ===
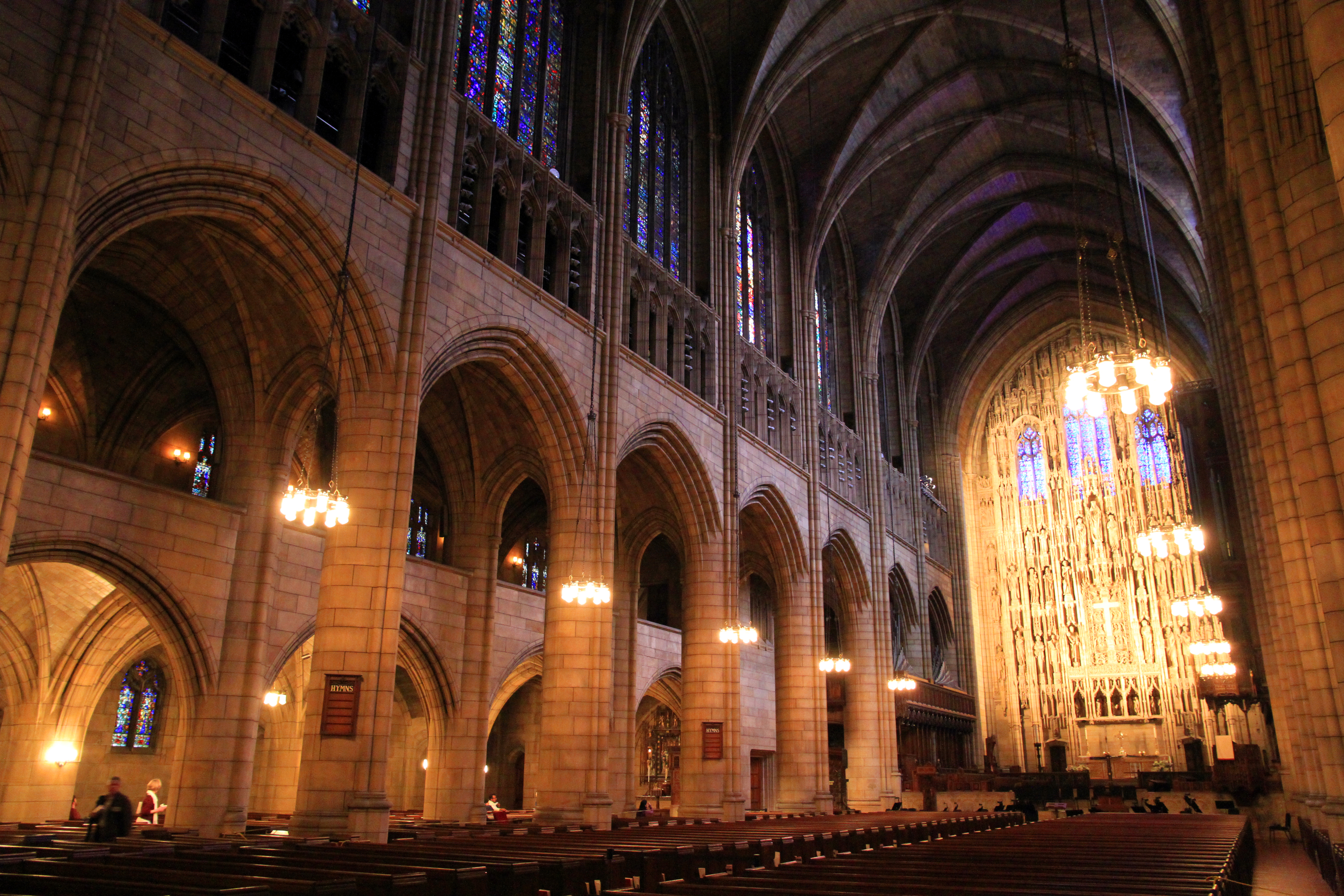
Interior, 2013

Musical offerings at Saint Thomas Church are enhanced through three organs. The Arents Memorial Chancel Organ, which has been replaced with the Irene D. and William R. Miller Chancel Organ in Memory of John Scott, was initially built as the "Opus 205" of the Ernest M. Skinner Company of Boston, Massachusetts, in 1913. This organ, which was revised in 1945, boasted 4 manuals and 77 ranks. In 1956, the organ was rebuilt, as "Opus 205-A", by the Aeolian-Skinner Company by G. Donald Harrison (died 1956), who died before the work was completed. This rebuilding expanded the organ to comprise 172 ranks. With damage to the reredos and the organ due to construction of the Museum of Modern Art, the church's immediate neighbor on West 53rd Street, Gilbert F. Adams of Brooklyn was contracted in 1969 to repair and rebuilt the organ. This revision decreased the number of ranks to 156. Further revisions were completed in the early 1980s by Mann & Trupiano. With the exception of the Trompette-en-Chamade, located under the Rose Window above the narthex, the entire instrument of the Great Organ was located in the church's chancel. The now-dismantled Great Organ featured an Electro-pneumatic and electric-slider stop and chest action, a Solid-State combination action, 4 manuals, 158 ranks and 9,050 pipes.

The Loening-Hancock Gallery Organ was built as "Opus 27" of Taylor & Boody Organbuilders of Staunton, Virginia, in 1996 to honor Gerre Hancock for 25 years of service to Saint Thomas Church. Located in the gallery beneath the church's Rose Window, this organ features a mechanical key and stop action, originally possessing 2 manuals, 25 stops, and 32 ranks. In 2015 it was slightly enlarged, according to original preparations, to its current 3 manuals, 31 stops and 44 ranks. Its case sports fumed white oak with pipe shades gilded in 23 carat gold. Its predecessor, the Loening Memorial Organ, dedicated in memory of Hermine Rubino Leoning, was built by Gilbert F. Adams in 1969 and featured 4 manuals, 59 stops, and 90 ranks.

The Martha J. Dodge Positiv Organ was built and installed in December 2001 by Taylor & Boody Organbuilders. This organ consists of 5 ranks, and is used as a continuo organ.

==== Miller-Scott Organ ====
On October 3, 2008, Saint Thomas Church announced its Vestry's decision to replace the aging Arents Memorial Chancel Organ with a new instrument. The announcement noted that as part of a substantial renovation effort to the church, a new instrument from Dobson Pipe Organ Builders of Lake City, Iowa, would be installed to replace the current instrument. Plans called for the retention of the especially ornate 1913 organ case-front and console cabinetry and, to better respect the church's well-developed neo-Gothic design aesthetic, the elimination of visible organ pipes added above the choir stall canopies in the 1956 rebuild.

The Irene D. and William R. Miller Chancel Organ in Memory of John Scott, dedicated on October 5 and 7, 2018, is one of North America's notable new pipe organs. In addition to supporting the parish's liturgical and musical life, the Miller-Scott Organ serves as a showcase for recitalists from all over the world and helps Saint Thomas train the next generation of organists.

The new organ contains 7,069 pipes, a number of which are from the former instrument. Fifteen sets of pipes, including some of the largest existing wooden ones, have been rebuilt and reinstated; these include the very softest sounds, several flutes and strings, and some specialty trumpet stops. Much of the design and decoration form for the new organ case are derived from precedents throughout the rest of the building, and Gothic revival style in general. In the 1913 north organ case, imagery is taken from Psalm 150: trumpet and lyre, string and cymbal. The new organ case takes as its decorative program the themes of music, ministry and praise. Carved texts include "Soli Deo Gloria" and quotations from the Psalms. Major carvings depict symbols of the Four Evangelists, and there are portraits of persons important in the recent life of Saint Thomas Church, including former directors of music Gerre Hancock and John Scott, Rector Emeritus Fr. Andrew Mead, and Irene and William Miller, whose benefaction was central to the creation of the Miller-Scott Organ.

=== Organists ===
- 1870–1900: George William Warren
- 1900–1912: Will C. Macfarlane
- 1913–1943: T. Tertius Noble
- 1943–1953: T. Frederick Candlyn
- 1954–1971: William Self
- 1971–2004: Gerre Hancock
- 2004–2015: John Scott
- 2016–2019: Daniel Hyde
- 2019–2025: Jeremy Filsell
- 2025–present: Richard Tanner
