= Ian Tracey (organist) =

British organist (born 1955)

- Born: 27 May 1955 (age 71); Liverpool, England, United Kingdom
- Education: Trinity College, London
- Known for: Organist of Liverpool Cathedral

Ian Graham Tracey DL (born 27 May 1955) is an English organist and choirmaster who served as Organist of Liverpool Cathedral from 1980 to 2026.

== Studies and career ==
Tracey, who was born in Liverpool in 1955, initially studied the organ under the then Organist of Liverpool Cathedral, Noel Rawsthorne. He subsequently continued his studies at Trinity College, London, before gaining further experience in Paris under André Isoir and Jean Langlais. In 1980, he succeeded Noel Rawsthorne and, in doing so, became the youngest cathedral organist in the United Kingdom at that time. He was later appointed Master of the Choristers, in addition to the position of organist, at Liverpool Cathedral.

In 2008, he relinquished the position of Master of the Choristers at Liverpool Cathedral to take up the role of Cathedral Organist (formerly known as Organist Titulaire); a role that gives him overall responsibility for the organs and recitals there, whilst affording him time for teaching, recording, writing and lecturing.

In addition to his Cathedral duties, Ian Tracey is also Organist (since 1986) to the City of Liverpool at St. George’s Hall, Chorus Master (since 1985) to the Royal Liverpool Philharmonic Society, Guest Music Director (since 1991) for the BBC's Daily Service, Professor, Fellow and Organist (since 1988) at Liverpool John Moores University and a past President (2001–2003) of the Incorporated Association of Organists. Since 2011, he has been Tonal Director for Makin Organs & Copeman Hart & Company Ltd.

Ian Tracey is in demand as an organ recitalist in the United Kingdom, Europe, and the United States, and has made a number of recordings, both solo and with orchestra.

In July 2006, he was admitted to the degree of Doctor of Music (honoris causa) in the University of Liverpool. This honorary doctorate was awarded for "his contribution to music". In 2015 he was appointed a Deputy Lieutenant of Merseyside.

Tracey retired as organist of Liverpool Cathedral organist in October 2026, concluding his 46 year tenure of that post by playing the Centenary Organ Recital.

== Discography ==
=== Solo organ ===
- Organ Recital (Various composers) (1989) Classics for Pleasure B000027F5R
- 1855 "Father" Willis Organ, St Georges Hall, Liverpool RLPO B00006J9MN
- Liverpool Encores (1990)Mirabilis Records MRCD901
- Ian Tracey plays the Willis Organ of Liverpool Cathedral (Various composers) (2005) Priory Records B0009B0GQS
- Bombarde! French Organ Classics (Various composers) Organ of Liverpool Cathedral (1999) Chandos Records B00000IYMZ
- Ian Tracey Plays Organ Transcriptions and French Romantic Music on the Henry Willis III Grand Organ of Liverpool Cathedral (Various composers) (2006) Priory B000FO44A8
- Ian Tracey - Organ Recital Organ of Liverpool Cathedral (Various composers) (2007) Classics for Pleasure B000MCIB4I

=== Organ with orchestra ===
- Vaughan Williams: Symphony No 7 (Sinfonia antartica) with Royal Liverpool Philharmonic Orchestra and Choir (2002) Classics for Pleasure B00006J3LP
- Poulenc/Guilmant/Widor - Organ Works Organ of Liverpool Cathedral with BBC Philharmonic (2000) Chandos B000000AUI
- Guilmant/Widor/Franck - Organ Works Organ of Liverpool Cathedral with BBC Philharmonic (2002) Chandos B00003XB23
- Tchaikovsky: 1812 Overture with Royal Liverpool Philharmonic Orchestra (2002) Classics for Pleasure B00006I05D
- Fantaisie Triomphale (Various composers) Organ of Liverpool Cathedral with BBC Philharmonic (2007) Chandos

=== Conductor ===
- Songs of Praise and Worship with Liverpool Cathedral Choir and Merseyside Massed Choirs HMV Classics B00004YL43
- Your Favourite Hymns with Liverpool Cathedral Choir and others (1992) Classics B00000DNUE
- Spirit of Christmas with the Royal Liverpool Philharmonic Orchestra and Choir, Liverpool Philharmonic Youth Choir and others (2007) RLP
