= Manchester International Organ Competition =

The Manchester International Organ Competition was part of the biennial Manchester Festival. The Organ Competition ran from 1978 until 1986.

== 1978 - First competition ==
The First competition was held between 1 and 9 September 1978. The venues were Manchester Town Hall, Royal Northern College of Music, Manchester Cathedral, Birchfields, St. Ann's Church, St. Phillip's Church and Manchester University. The artistic director was Geraint Jones.

- First prize - John Scott
- Second prize - Peter Sweeney

== 1980 - Second competition ==
The Second competition was held between 9 and 26 July 1980

- First prize -
- Second prize - Thomas Trotter, Patricia Snyder (joint)

== 1982 - Third competition ==
The third competition was held 6–11 September 1982.

- First prize - Michael Overbury
- Second prize -

== 1984 - Fourth competition ==
- First prize - John Keys
- Second prize - Nick Murdoch

== 1986 - Fifth competition ==
- First prize - Andrew Lumsden
- Second prize - Giovanni Feltrin

After 1986 the Manchester International Festival continued biennially, but the organ competition was dropped.
