= John Keys (organist) =

British organist

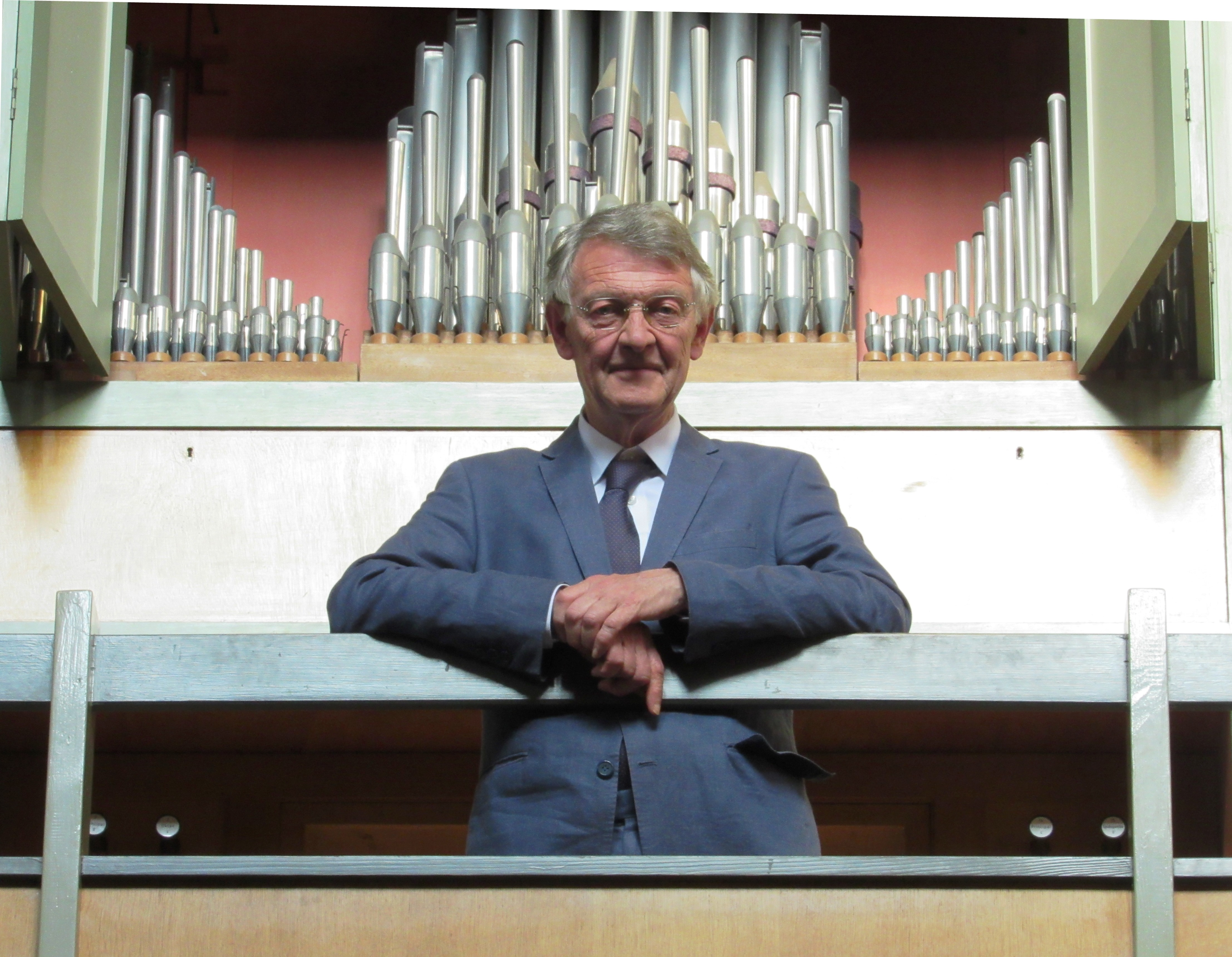
- John Keys in front of the Marcussen & Søn organ at St Mary's Church, Nottingham

Background information
- Born: 3 December 1956 (age 69); Chester, England
- Genre: Choral music
- Occupations: Organist, choirmaster
- Instrument: Pipe organ
- Website: www.john-keys.co

John Keys MA (Oxon), LRAM, ARCM, Hon FGCM (born 3 December 1956) is a British and international organist.

== Career ==
Born in Chester, John Keys was a pupil of Malcolm Boyle and later assistant organist at Chester Cathedral. Afterwards he was organ scholar to Edward Higginbottom at New College, Oxford, and then studied in Geneva with Lionel Rogg where he won the 1re Prix de Virtuosité from the Conservatoire de Musique de Genève. On his return from Geneva he was appointed Director of Music at St. Mary's Church, Nottingham, in 1984. That year, he won first prize at the 4th Manchester International Organ Competition. He is also the University of Nottingham's organist and keyboard tutor.

Shortly after his appointment in Nottingham, St Mary's Church underwent a substantial programme of restoration. To accompany this John formed the 'Orchestra of the Restoration' with local musicians in 1988.

In 2014, Keys completed recordings of the music of all 941 hymns in the new "Ancient & Modern" hymn book. Also in 2014, an extract of Keys's recording of "Abide With Me" was used in a BBC Radio Berkshire programme on "How the Church Responded to War", as part of the BBC "World War I at Home" series. In 2015, some of Keys's recordings were used in a short service at the end of a trip down the Thames by the ship Havengore, as part of the 50th anniversary commemorations of the death of Winston Churchill.

Keys is an Honorary Fellow of the Guild of Church Musicians. In 2012, he was nominated for vice chair of the board of trustees for the Binns organ in the Albert Hall, Nottingham. In 2016, Keys was appointed Nottingham City Organist. He retired from St Mary's, Nottingham, after 41 years in September 2025.
