= T. Tertius Noble =

British organist and composer (1867–1953)

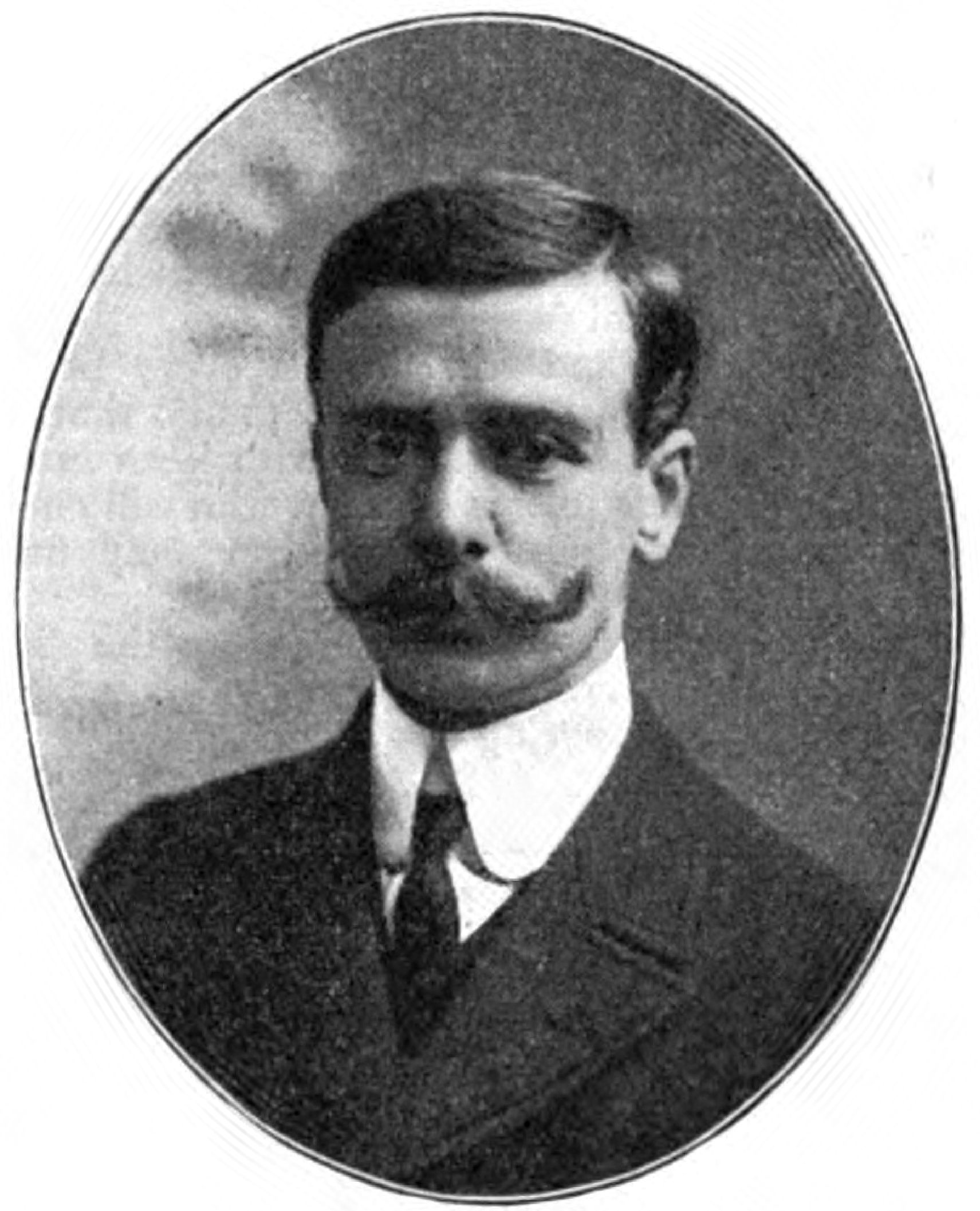
- Born: Thomas Tertius Noble; May 5, 1867; Bath, England
- Died: May 4, 1953 (aged 85); Rockport, Massachusetts, U.S.
- Education: Royal College of Music
- Occupations: Organist and composer

Thomas Tertius Noble (May 5, 1867 – May 4, 1953) was an English-born organist and composer, who lived in the United States for the latter part of his career.

He served as organist and choirmaster at a number of churches including Ely Cathedral and York Minster in England and St Thomas Episcopal Church in New York City. He is chiefly remembered for his music for the Anglican church.

== Early life and education ==
Noble was born on 5 May 1867 in Bath, England, to Thomas Noble (a silversmith) and Sarah Jefferson. The name 'Tertius' derives from Noble being the third Thomas in his family.

In his youth, Noble was introduced to the pipe organ by James Pyne, organist at Bath Abbey, and from 1880 he was tutored in the organ at Gloucester Cathedral. Frederick Ouseley declined to accept Noble as a student at his music school, citing that "the market was over-stocked." He sent his first composition, Theme and Variations, to Rheinberger and Best; their feedback was mixed.

At the age of 15 he was appointed organist at All Saints' Church, Colchester, where he was also educated by the rector. He won a scholarship to attend the Royal College of Music, where he was tutored by Walter Parratt, Charles Villiers Stanford and Frederick Bridge, and made other close connections with George Grove and John Stainer.

== Career ==
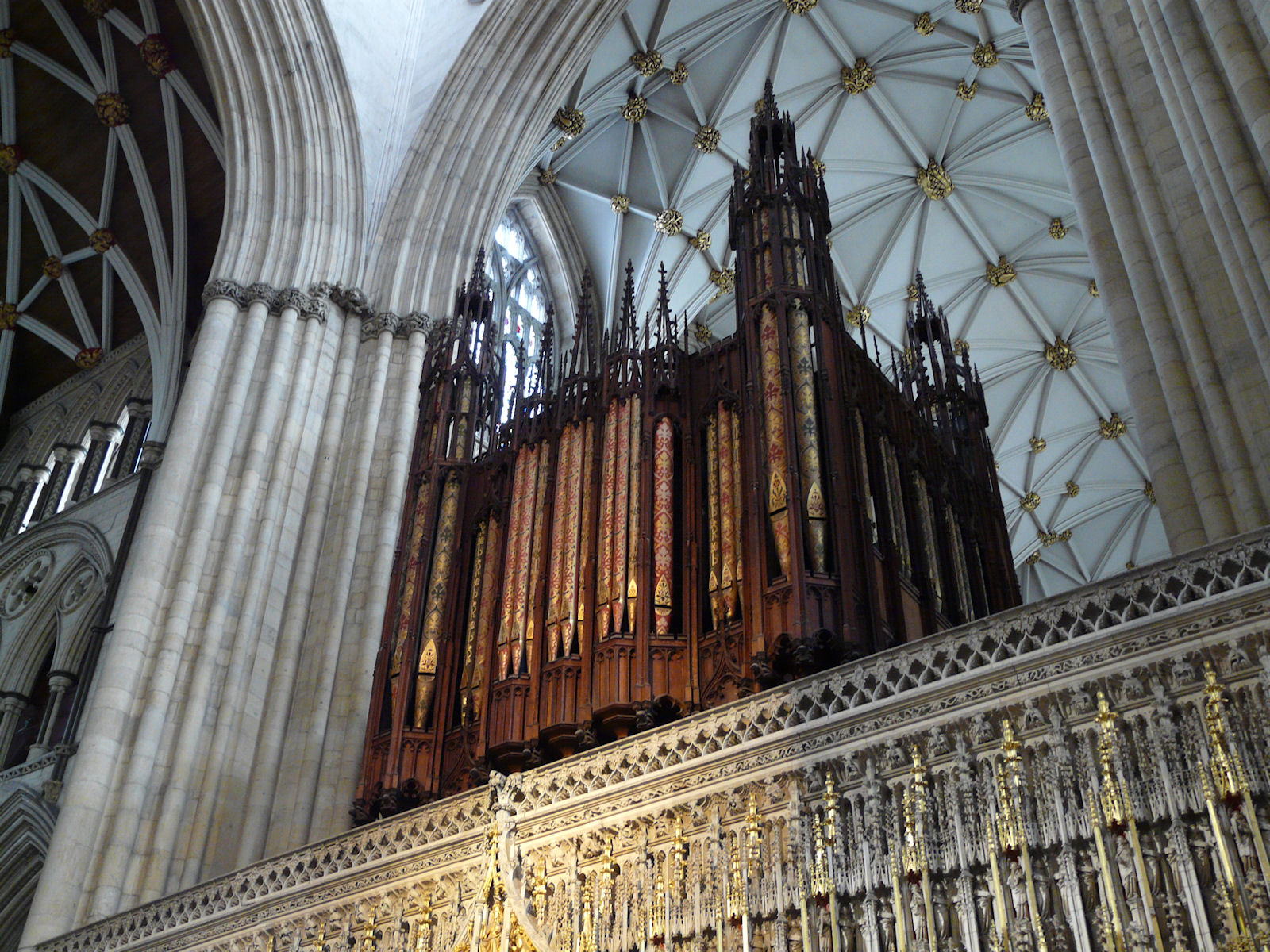
The organ of York Minster, where Noble served 1898-1913

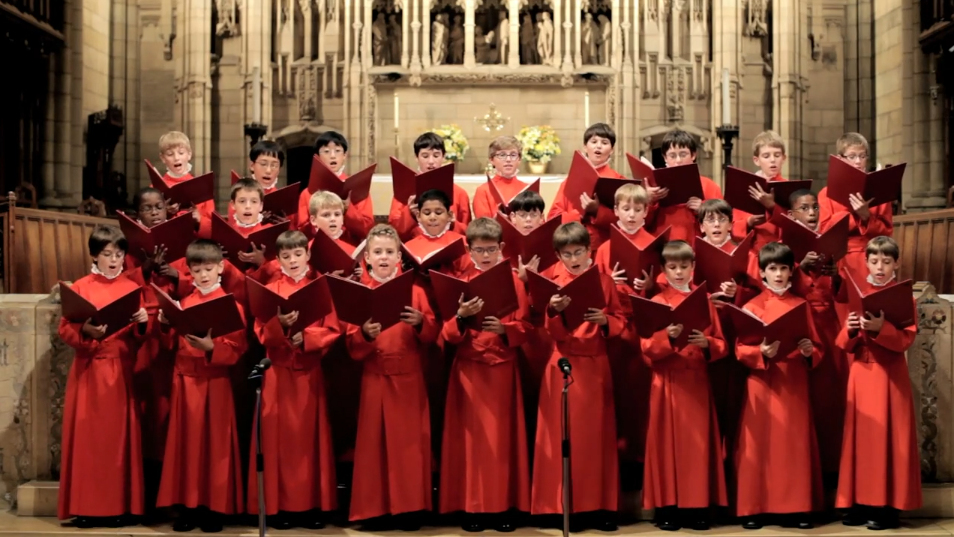
Choristers singing at St Thomas Episcopal Church, Manhattan, a tradition established by Noble in the early 1910s

Noble's Evening Canticles in B minor (1898), sung by the choir of St Paul's Episcopal Church, Indianapolis
Magnificat

Nunc Dimittis

After graduating from the Royal College of Music in 1889, Noble was appointed a member of staff there, teaching the organ. He also took the position of organist at the Church of St John the Evangelist, Wilton Road, in London.

In 1890, Stanford recommended him to fill the vacancy as his assistant organist at Trinity College Chapel, Cambridge. Noble was dissatisfied with the quality of singing and Stanford's bad temper, leaving Trinity in 1892 to serve as organist and choirmaster at Ely Cathedral.

From 1898 to 1913 Noble served as organist at York Minster. While there, he established the York Symphony Orchestra and composed pieces for them. He was also conductor of the York Musical Society and in 1910 revived the York Festival.

In January 1913 Noble moved to America after accepting the post of organist and choirmaster of St Thomas Episcopal Church in New York City, traversing on the Carmania. He was responsible for establishing a choral tradition at St Thomas's along Anglican cathedral lines. He also oversaw the installation of a new organ at the church and founded the Saint Thomas Choir School for boys in 1919. This was Noble's final position, which he held for 35 years. He retired from St. Thomas in 1947 at the age of 75, and spent his last years in Rockport, Massachusetts, at St. Mary’s Episcopal Church, where he continued to compose until his death on May 4, 1953. He designed a new organ for St Mary's in 1947 which was built by M. P. Möller.

In 1932 Noble became the first person outside the British Isles to be awarded the Lambeth degree of Doctor of Music by the Archbishop of Canterbury. He was an examiner and member of the national council of the American Guild of Organists and also served as president of the National Association of Organists. He was a member of the Hymn Society of America, and served as its president for multiple terms.

Noble composed orchestral and chamber music, including an orchestral Introduction and Passacaglia performed at The Proms on 17 August 1945, where it was conducted by a former pupil, Basil Cameron. But he is now remembered for his music for the Anglican church, particularly his Evening services in A major, B minor and A minor, and his anthems Go to dark Gethsemane, Souls of the Righteous, and Grieve not the Holy Spirit. His tunes were used for seven hymns in The Hymnal of the Protestant Episcopal Church in the United States of America, 1940. His tune Ora labora for the hymn Come, labour on is well known in the United States, as is his edition of Handel's Messiah, published by G. Schirmer in 1912. For Lowell Mason's sesquicentennial celebrations, he wrote an organ prelude based on Mason's Watchman.

== Personal life ==
In 1897 Noble married Meriel Maude Stubbs (daughter of Charles Stubbs, Dean of Ely), with whom he had a son, Philip Raymond Noble (1903–1979). English jazz composer and actor Ray Noble (1903–1978) was his nephew.

== Death ==
Noble died on 4 May 1953, the day before his 86th birthday, in Rockport, Massachusetts, and he was buried at Beech Grove Cemetery there. The hymn tune "Rockport" composed by Noble was named after the city of his death.

Religious titles
Preceded by Basil Harwood	Organist and Master of the Choristers of Ely Cathedral; 1892 – 1898	Succeeded by Hugh Allen
Preceded by John Naylor	Organist and Director of Music, York Minster; 1897 – 1913	Succeeded by Sir Edward Bairstow
Preceded by Will C. MacFarlane	Organist & Choirmaster, Saint Thomas Church, New York; 1913–1943	Succeeded by T. Frederick Candlyn
