= Jeremy Filsell =

English pianist, organist and composer

- Born: 10 April 1964
- Education: Keble College
- Occupation: Musician

Jeremy Daniel Filsell (born 10 April 1964) is a British pianist, organist and composer who has served as director of music at Christ Episcopal Church in Bradenton, Florida since September 2025. He previously held similar positions in the United Kingdom and the United States, including at Saint Thomas Church, Fifth Avenue, in New York City from 2019 to 2025.

== Biography ==
Having played piano and organ from a young age, Filsell was a student at Stivichall Primary School and Blue Coat Church of England School in Coventry. He was a Limpus prize winner for the Royal College of Organists examination, which he took when he was 19, and a silver medalist of the Worshipful Company of Musicians. He studied music at Oxford University, where he was an organ scholar at Keble College, studying with Nicolas Kynaston and Daniel Roth. He went on to study piano with David Parkhouse and Hilary McNamara at the Royal College of Music and Martin Hughes at the University of Surrey. He won second prize in the 1993 St Albans International Organ Competition.

He has particular interest in English piano music and French organ music. He plays in a piano trio with Oliver Lewis, violin, and Neil Heyde, cello, and a piano duo with Francis Pott.

=== Piano ===
He has performed as a piano soloist around the world, and recorded in solo and concerto repertoire for Radio 3. He has been a repetiteur for John Eliot Gardiner, Vernon Handley and Sir Charles Groves. From 1989 to 1991 he was pianist of the European Contemporary Music Ensemble. He has recorded little-known piano music by Eugene Goossens, Herbert Howells, Carl Johann Eschmann, and Bernard Stevens, and the piano and organ sonatas of Julius Reubke.

=== Organ ===
He performed the complete organ works of Marcel Dupré in London in 1998, over nine weekly recitals at St Peter's Church, Eaton Square. He recorded the same works over a two-week period in September of the same year, on 12 CDs. He completed a Ph.D. thesis on contextual, analytical and aesthetic issues in the music of Marcel Dupré, at Birmingham Conservatoire/University of Central England. In 2021, Filsell performed Dupré's complete organ works, to mark the fiftieth anniversary of the composer's death, in a concert series at Saint Thomas Church in New York, where Dupré himself once played and recorded some of his works.

He has made original transcriptions for organ of orchestral works (such as Paul Dukas's The Sorcerer's Apprentice) and transcribed the improvisations of Pierre Cochereau as recorded at Notre-Dame de Paris. These are published by Editions Chantraine, Belgium.

He has made a complete recording of the six Organ Symphonies of Louis Vierne on the 1890 Cavaillé-Coll organ in Abbatiale Saint-Ouen, Rouen, and the organ music of Arthur Wills and Francis Pott, amongst many others.

=== Academic and professional posts ===
Until 2008 he was lecturer in academic studies at the Royal Academy of Music, visiting tutor in organ studies at the Royal Northern College of Music, taught at Eton College and was a countertenor lay clerk in the choir of St George's Chapel, Windsor Castle. Previously he was assistant organist at Ely Cathedral, director of music at St Luke's, Chelsea, and assistant director of music at St Peter's Church, Eaton Square, both in London. He has taught masterclasses in performance and interpretation on the Henry Wood and Oundle International Summer Schools, Eton Choral Courses, and in the U.S. at Yale University and Utah State University.

From 2008 to 2009, Filsell was principal organist of the Basilica of the National Shrine of the Immaculate Conception in Washington, D.C. He then directed the music at Old St Paul's Episcopal Church, Baltimore, and in 2010 became artist-in-residence at Washington National Cathedral, where he performed Olivier Messiaen's work La Nativité du Seigneur on 18 December 2011.

In 2019 he succeeded Daniel Hyde as director of music at Saint Thomas Church on Fifth Avenue in New York City. He left in 2025 and was subsequently appointed organist and director of music at Christ Episcopal Church in Bradenton, Florida.

== Personal life ==
Filsell is married to Rebecca Kellerman-Filsell, a freelance soprano who also works with Sarasota Young Voices in Sarasota, Florida. She previously taught at Saint Thomas Choir School in New York City, where she founded and directed the children's parish choir at Saint Thomas Church, and at St. Alban's Episcopal Church in Washington, D.C.

== Notes and references ==
| Preceded by Daniel Hyde | Organist and Director of Music, Saint Thomas Church, New York; 2019–2025 | Succeeded by Richard Tanner |
