= Gordon Stewart (organist) =

British organist, conductor, and teacher

Gordon Brodie Stewart BEM (born 1952) is a British organist, conductor, and teacher.

== Biography ==
Stewart was born in Dundee, Scotland. His first appointment as an organist was at Dundee Methodist Church at the age of 14, followed by St. James' Church in Dundee. Stewart studied at the Royal Northern College of Music and the Geneva Conservatoire. Among his organ teachers were Eric Chadwick, Gillian Weir, and Lionel Rogg. He also studied piano with Kathleen McGrath, flute with Vivienne Leigh, harpsichord with Robert Elliott of the Alfred Deller Consort, and choir-training with John Bertalot.

While in Geneva, Stewart was the organist and choirmaster of the American Church and assistant organist at the Anglican Church. On returning to the UK, Stewart was Director of Music at the Parish Church of St Mary the Virgin, Bowdon for four years.

Stewart made regular appearances as Musical Director for BBC Radio 4's The Daily Service and the BBC's Songs of Praise over a period of fifteen years until 2011.

Stewart worked in cathedral music for many years; he was the organist at Manchester Cathedral between 1981 and 1992 and performed a concert series in 1985 in which he played the complete organ works of J S Bach. From 1994 to 1998, he was the organist at Blackburn Cathedral. He was also Director of the Royal School of Church Music Millennium Youth Choir between 2002 and 2004.

He was also on the teaching staff at the Royal Northern College of Music between 1985 and 2000 and at Chetham's School of Music from 1981 to 1996 as organ tutor and lecturer in choir training. He is now a visiting organ tutor at the University of Cambridge. He has led masterclasses for the Incorporated Association of Organists, Royal School of Church Music, Royal College of Organists, Royal College of Music, Hull University, Shenandoah University in Virginia, Alkmaar Organ Academy, and Pretoria University in South Africa. As of July 2013 he is an organ tutor at the Oundle International Festival Oundle for Organists summer school. Former pupils have held positions at St. Paul's Cathedral London, Westminster Abbey, Wells Cathedral, Llandaff Cathedral, St Mary's Cathedral Edinburgh, and Coventry Cathedral.

Stewart has been Borough Organist in Kirklees at the Huddersfield Town Hall since 1989, playing regular organ recitals on the 1865 Henry Willis & Sons organ. He regularly tours abroad as an organ recitalist, most recently in Denmark at the cathedrals of Aarhus and Copenhagen in Summer 2015. He has played concerts throughout Europe and the United States, South Africa in 2016 and Australia. In 2011, he was in Sweden giving masterclasses at the Göteborg International Organ Academy His repertoire covers all the major schools of organ composition.

Stewart was awarded the British Empire Medal (BEM) in the 2023 Birthday Honours for services to music.

Various composers have written music for him, including:

- Andrew Carter: Concerto in C for organ, woodwind and strings; Petite Suite (trumpet and organ)
- Lionel Rogg: Partita on Nun freut euch
- Noel Rawsthorne: Dance Suite for organ, for the reopening of the restored Father Willis organ in Huddersfield Town Hall; and the Celtic Lament
- Dick Koomans: Nun komm, der Heiden Heiland
- Alan Spedding: Variations on Victimae Paschali
- Robert Cockcroft: A Good king chills out for the Spring; Prelude on Anima Christi, and Variations on a Danish Nursery Song
- Michael Ball: Concerto for organ
- John Scott Whiteley: Carillon Concertante
- John Bertalot: Come Risen Lord Anthem for SATB choir and organ

== Honorary, voluntary and other positions ==
- Past President of the Incorporated Association of Organists 1993-1995
- Honorary President of the Friends of the Caird Hall Organ from the charity's launch in 2010

== Academic awards, honours and distinctions ==
- Performer's Diploma with Distinction from the Royal Northern College of Music
- Premier Prix de Virtuosité from Geneva Conservatoire
- Honorary Doctorate, University of Huddersfield (2005)
- Honorary Fellowship of the Royal College of Organists (2004)
- Honorary Fellowship of the Royal School of Church Music (2001) for work in education and religious broadcasting
- Honorary Fellowship of the Guild of Church Musicians (2009)

== Discography ==
- A Land of pure delight RSCM Millennium Youth Choir with Director Gordon Stewart (2002) Lammas
- Gordon Stewart plays the organ of Pietermaritzburg City Hall (2007) PMB1
- Gordon Stewart plays the organ of St Giles Church, Pontefract (2007) Dolcan001
- Scherzo Gordon Stewart plays the organ at St Mary's Cathedral, Johannesburg (2009) Dolcan004
- Gordon Stewart plays the Caird Hall organ (2009) Dolcan005
- A Celebration - Organ music from Dewsbury Minster (2009) Dolcan006
- A Song of sunshine (2010) Dolcan007 played on the 1877 Father Willis organ of All Saints Church, Hastings
- Huddersfield by request (2012) Dolcan008 recorded in Huddersfield Town Hall on the Father Willis organ in August 2012
- The Organ music of Noel Rawsthorne (2012) Dolcan009 many of the tracks never before recorded
- Gordon Stewart plays Andrew Carter Organ Works (2013) AC 0CD 001 recorded on the Father Willis organ of Huddersfield Town Hall. This recording was named as the Editor's Choice in December 2013's edition of the Organists' Review.
- The J J Binns organ in Providence Church: A Centenary celebration (2014) Dolcan 10 programmed to show off the New Mills' organ's wide range of tonal colours and including an unpublished piece by the Yorkshire composer, Robert Cockcroft.

== Compositions ==
- Whither shall I go then from the spirit: recorded on Thy word is a lantern, with Blackburn Cathedral Choir directed by Richard Tanner and soloist Daniel Prowse (1999).

Text from Psalm 139, set for baritone solo, seven-part men's voices and organ.

- Aria for JT: recorded on the CD from Dewsbury Minster

Cultural offices
Preceded by Stephen Pinnock	Organist of Manchester Cathedral; 1981–1992	Succeeded by Christopher Stokes
Preceded by David Anthony Cooper	Organist and Master of the Choristers of Blackburn Cathedral; 1994–1998	Succeeded by Richard Tanner
