= T. Frederick Candlyn =

British musician

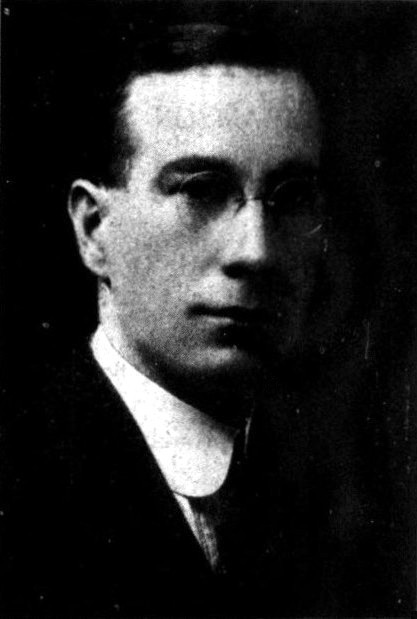
- T. Frederick H. Candlyn in 1926
- Born: Thomas Frederick Handel Candlyn; 17 December 1892; Davenham, Cheshire, England
- Died: 16 December 1964 (aged 71); Point Lookout, New York, United States
- Burial place: Long Island National Cemetery, East Farmingdale, New York
- Education: BMus, Durham University (1911)
- Occupations: Organist, choirmaster
- Era: 20th century
- Spouse: Dorothy Ridgway Candlyn (m. 1917)
- Children: 2

Thomas Frederick Handel Candlyn (17 December 1892 – 16 December 1964) was an English-born organist, composer and choirmaster who spent most of his professional career at two Episcopal Church congregations in New York.

Candlyn was born 17 December 1892, in Davenham, Cheshire, England, the son of Thomas John Candlin, an organist. From 1908 until 1910, he was assistant organist at St George's Minster, Doncaster and studied with the church's organist, Wilfrid Sanderson. Candlyn received the Bachelor of Music degree from Durham University in 1911.

In 1915 he was offered the position of organist and choirmaster at St. Paul's Church, Albany, New York, by its rector Dr. Roelif H. Brooks and he emigrated to the United States. He was to remain at St. Paul’s for twenty-eight years, with the exception of the period between 21 September 1917, and 25 April 1919, when he served with the American Expeditionary Forces (AEF) during World War I and became a corporal. On 25 June 1918, Candlyn became a United States citizen at Fort Devens, Massachusetts.

During his years in Albany, Candlyn taught at the New York State College for Teachers, as instructor from 1921 until his appointment as assistant professor starting with the 1935–1936 school year. He served as chair of the music department beginning in 1924 and received an honorary doctorate of pedagogy (Pd.D.) from the college in June 1927. Candlyn edited the compilation The Songs of New York State College for Teachers, published by H.W. Gray Company in 1923. He founded the Albany Oratorio Society and conducted the Mendelssohn Club of Albany during its 1939-1940 and 1940-1941 seasons.

In 1943, Dr. Brooks (who had left Albany in 1926) offered Candlyn the position of organist and choirmaster at St. Thomas Episcopal Church, New York. He oversaw renovations to St. Thomas's organ in the 1940's. This work is partially documented in letters printed in Charles Callahan's The American Classic Organ: A History in Letters. Candlyn worked at St. Thomas until his retirement in 1954 due to increasingly poor eyesight.

After his retirement from St. Thomas, Candlyn was the organist and choirmaster at Trinity Church, Roslyn, (Long Island) New York.

Candlyn composed two hundred works, primarily anthems, cantatas, service settings and organ solos. Three of his anthems ("Christ, whose glory fills the skies," "Thee We Adore," and "King of Glory, King of Peace") remain part of the standard repertoire of Episcopal church choirs in North America. When he was appointed to St. Thomas in 1943, The Diapason, journal of the American Guild of Organists, wrote that he was "known to all church musicians for his compositions."

Candlyn and his wife, Dorothy Ridgway Candlyn, had a daughter and a son. His son, Sgt. Donald S. Candlyn, was killed 26 December 1944 in Luxembourg during World War II at the age of nineteen. He was posthumously awarded the Silver Star.

Candlyn died of lung cancer on 16 December 1964 in Point Lookout, New York on Long Island. He was survived by his wife and daughter.

He is buried at Long Island National Cemetery, East Farmingdale, New York.

== Prizes ==
- Clemson Gold Medal for the anthem "O come, O come, Emmanuel", 1919
- Strawbridge Clothier Prize, 1923
- The Philadelphia Sesqui-Centennial International Exhibition (category A Capella Suite) for "The Historical Suite", 1925
- The Audsley Memorial Medal of the National Association of Organists for "Sonata Dramatica", 1926
- Guild of Organists Prize for the cantata "The Light of the World"

== Sources ==
- "T.F.H. Candlyn, 72, Church Organist," The New York Times 18 December 1964
- "Albany Organist Gets Position at St. Thomas", The New York Times 6 August 1943
- "Church Organist Gets Son’s Medal", The New York Times 12 November 1945
- Materials from the archives of the University at Albany: Minutes of the Board of Trustees for 6 June 1927; Executive Committee Minutes, Volume 4, 1924 – 1939, page 1180; New York State College for Teachers Annual Catalogue
- "Frederick Candlyn". Biographical Dictionary of the Organ.
- Anderson, E. Ruth (1982). Contemporary Composers: A Biographical Dictionary. Boston: G.K. Hall & Company.
- Catherine R. Rogers, "Cultural Contributions of Albanians" (1933 M.A. thesis, New York State Teachers' College), pages 110-112

Preceded by T. Tertius Noble	Organist & Choirmaster, Saint Thomas Church, New York; 1943–1954	Succeeded by William Self
