= Noel Rawsthorne =

British musician (1929–2019)

- Born: Christopher Noel Rawsthorne; 24 December 1929; Birkenhead, England
- Died: 28 January 2019 (aged 89) Liverpool, England
- Genres: Liturgical, classical
- Occupations: Organist, composer
- Instrument: Organ
- Years active: 1937–1993

Christopher Noel Rawsthorne (24 December 1929 – 28 January 2019) was a British liturgical and concert organist and composer of music for his own instrument, as well as choral music.

== Biography ==
Rawsthorne was born in Birkenhead. At the age of eight he became a chorister at Liverpool Parish Church, which started his interest in the pipe organ. Two years later, he became a chorister at Liverpool Cathedral (while also studying at Liverpool Institute High School) and started organ lessons under Caleb Jarvis at the nearby St George's Hall.

Six years later, he pursued organ studies under Harold Dawber at the Royal Manchester College of Music, after receiving a coveted exhibition. In 1949, he became the Assistant Organist at the cathedral, and was also awarded the Associateship of the Royal College of Organists (ARCO). He was elected a Fellow of the college (FRCO) in 1953.

In 1958, he received an education grant to study in Italy with Fernando Germani, and later in Paris with Marcel Dupré. He became Organist of Liverpool Cathedral in 1955, succeeding Harry Goss-Custard, and served in this capacity until 1980. While there, he composed many original choral works, such as the Festive Eucharist (1978), which is still sung regularly by churches across the Anglican Diocese of Liverpool. Until 1993, Rawsthorne was Senior Lecturer in Music at St Katharine's College, Liverpool (now Liverpool Hope University).

Rawsthorne received an honorary doctorate in music from the University of Liverpool, and his work with the Royal Liverpool Philharmonic Orchestra included supervision of the refurbishment of the Rushworth and Dreaper organ in the Philharmonic Hall. He enjoyed substantial friendships, personal and professional, with successive Maestros of the Philharmonic. He mentored Ian Tracey (later a professor), who succeeded him as Organist of Liverpool Cathedral in 1980.

He died in Liverpool in 2019, aged 89.

== Compositions and arrangements ==
Rawsthorne's compositions and arrangements are found in many contemporary collections of organ music.

His Hornpipe Humoresque is an amusing set of variations on the familiar Sailor's Hornpipe, in the styles of Bach (Brandenburg Concerto No. 3, 1st movement), Vivaldi ("Spring", 1st movement, from The Four Seasons), Arne (Rule Britannia) and Widor ("Toccata" from Symphony for Organ No. 5). Arguably his most popular work is the Aria in F major.

To commemorate Rawsthorne's 83rd birthday, a CD of 23 of his works, including many never previously recorded, was recorded by Gordon Stewart.

In 2025, after his death, 'Two Chorale Fantasies', major organ works, were published by ChurchOrganWorld. The first, Wachet auf, ruft uns die Stimme, was written in 2005 "to Ian Tracey on his 25th Anniversary Recital as Organist of Liverpool Cathedral". The second, Ein feste Burg ist unser Gott, was partially written "à mon ami Gordon Stewart" and was completed after his death by Ian Tracey.
