= Gerre Hancock =

American organist, improviser, and composer

Gerre Edward Hancock (February 21, 1934 – January 21, 2012) was an American organist, improviser and composer, who served as director of music at Saint Thomas Church in New York City from 1971 to 2004.

== Early life and education ==
Hancock was born in Lubbock, Texas. He received a Bachelor of Music degree from the University of Texas at Austin, and a Master of Sacred Music degree from Union Theological Seminary in New York, from which he later received the Unitas Distinguished Alumnus Award. A recipient of a Rotary Foundation Fellowship, he also studied in Paris at the Sorbonne and during this time was a finalist at the ARD International Music Competition.

Hancock studied organ with E. William Doty, Robert Baker, Jean Langlais, and Marie-Claire Alain, and improvisation with Nadia Boulanger and Searle Wright (1918–2004).

== Career ==
Hancock served as Organist at Second Baptist Church in Lubbock, Texas; Assistant Organist at Saint Bartholomew's Episcopal Church, New York; Organist and Choirmaster at Christ Church (now Christ Church Cathedral) in Cincinnati, Ohio; and Organist and Master of the Choristers at Saint Thomas Church Fifth Avenue in New York City from 1971 to 2004.

A Fellow of the American Guild of Organists, Hancock was a member of its National Council and was a founder and past president of the Association of Anglican Musicians. He served on the faculty of The Juilliard School in New York City and taught improvisation on a visiting basis at the Institute of Sacred Music, Yale University in New Haven, CT, and The Eastman School of Music in Rochester, New York.

A featured recitalist and lecturer at numerous regional conventions of the American Guild of Organists and at national conventions of the Guild in Philadelphia, Cleveland, Boston, Washington DC, Detroit, Houston and New York City, Hancock also represented the AGO as recitalist at the Centenary Anniversary of the Royal College of Organists in London. Hancock was heard in recital in many cities throughout the United States and worldwide. On occasion he performed in duo recitals with his wife, Judith Hancock.

=== Awards and recognition ===
In 1981, he was appointed a Fellow of the Royal School of Church Music and in 1995 was appointed a Fellow of the Royal College of Organists. Hancock received honorary Doctor of Music degrees from the Nashotah House Seminary and The University of the South at Sewanee, Tennessee. In May 2004 he was awarded the Doctor of Divinity degree (Honoris causa) from The General Theological Seminary in New York. He is listed in “Who’s Who in America,” and his biography appears in The New Grove Dictionary of Music and Musicians, 2nd edition. In 2004 he was honored in a ceremony at Lambeth Palace in London where he was presented the Medal of the Cross of St. Augustine by the Archbishop of Canterbury. In May 2009, Hancock was made Doctor of Music (Honoris causa) at Westminster Choir College in Princeton, NJ. In June 2010, Hancock was presented the International Performer of the Year Award by the New York City Chapter of the American Guild of Organists. This is viewed by many as the most distinguished award that the American Guild of Organists bestows upon its colleagues.

== Personal life ==
In 1961 Hancock married fellow organist Judith Eckerman (1934−2025), with whom he had two daughters.

He died in Austin on January 21, 2012, at the age of 77.

== Compositions ==
His compositions for organ and chorus are widely performed. He recorded for Gothic Records, Decca/Argo, Koch International and Priory Records, both as a conductor of The St. Thomas Choir and as a soloist.

=== Selected compositions ===
==== Organ solo ====
- Air: a prelude for organ (composed 1960. New York: Oxford University Press, 2000)
- Fantasy on "Divinum Mysterium" (. Melville, NY: H. W. Gray, 1973)
- A paraphrase of "St. Elizabeth" (New York: Oxford University Press, 1975)
- Prelude on "Hyfrydol" (Melville, NY: H. W. Gray, 1979)
- Prelude and fugue on "Union Seminary" (Melville, NY: H. W. Gray, 1983)
- Prelude on "Slane" (In: The AGO 90th-anniversary anthology of American organ music, ed. Philip Brunelle. New York: Oxford University Press, 1988)
- Fanfare on "Antioch" (Joy to the world) (In: The Oxford book of Christmas organ music, ed. Robert Gower. Oxford: Oxford University Press, 1995)
- A meditation on "Draw us in the spirit’s tether" (New York: Oxford University Press, 1998)
- Variations on "Coronation" (Orleans, MA: Paraclete Press, 2000)
- An Evocation of "Urbs beata Jerusalem" (Orleans, MA: Paraclete Press, 2016)
- Variations on "Palm Beach" (New York: Oxford University Press, 2001)
- Toccata (New York: Oxford University Press, 2003)
- Variations on "Ora Labora" (New York: Oxford University Press, 2004)
- A Laredo fanfare (Orleans, MA: Paraclete, 2016)

==== Two organs ====
- Holy week (Orleans, MA: Paraclete Press, 2007)

== Bibliography ==
Gerre Hancock: Improvising: how to master the art. New York: Oxford University Press, 1994.

== Discography ==
- The organ music of Gerre Hancock. Todd Wilson and Kevin Kwan, Organists. Organs at St. Thomas Church, New York. Richmond, VA: Raven Records, 2014. 2 CDs.
- The Music of Gerre Hancock. The Saint Thomas Choir of Men and Boys, Fifth Avenue, New York; the Saint Thomas Brass; Jeremy Filsell. Signum Classics, 2021.

Preceded by William Self	Organist & Master of the Choristers, Saint Thomas Church, New York; 1971–2004	Succeeded by John Scott
