= St. Paul's Episcopal Church (Put-in-Bay, Ohio) =

Religion
- Affiliation: Episcopal Church
- Status: Active

Location
- State: Ohio
- Interactive map of St. Paul's Episcopal Church
- Coordinates: 41.651868°N 82.822892°W

Architecture
- Type: Church
- Style: Carpenter Gothic
- Completed: 1865
- Materials: Board and Baton

St. Paul's Episcopal Church
- St. Paul's Episcopal Church
- St. Paul's Episcopal Church
- Location: 623 Catawba Ave. (at Lakeview), Put-in-Bay, Ohio
- Denomination: Episcopal
- Churchmanship: Via Media
- Website: http://stpaulsputinbay.org/

Architecture
- Architect(s): Upjohn; Builder, unknown

Administration
- Province: Five
- Diocese: Episcopal Diocese of Ohio
- Deanery: North Central Mission Area

Clergy
- Priest: The Rev. Mary L. Staley

St. Paul's Episcopal Church is a historic American Episcopal church in Put-in-Bay, Ohio, on South Bass Island in Lake Erie. It is the oldest religious structure on the island, believed to be the oldest wooden church still in use in Ohio, and is one of the oldest churches of any construction in continuous use in Ohio. It is located just three blocks south of the downtown area of the village of Put-in-Bay, at Catawba Ave and Lakeview Dr. It is a congregation of the Episcopal Diocese of Ohio.

In 2019, the church reported 43 members; in 2023, it reported 34 members. No membership statistics were reported in 2024 national parochial reports. Plate and pledge financial support reported by the church in 2023 was $108,783. Average Sunday Attendance (ASA) reported in 2024 was 19 persons. This was a relative decrease on ASA of 31 in 2015.

== History ==
=== Parish founding ===
St. Paul's Episcopal Church was established in the autumn of 1864 by the Rev. John Miles Kendrick and the local residents. They started out meeting in the school. Over the winter they raised funds to build a church building. In May 1865, at the close of the Civil War, railroad baron and philanthropist Jay Cooke purchased the property where the church sits and contributed to the building fund. The Carpenter Gothic church was completed in October 1865. It appears to have been built from a design in the book Rural Architecture by architect Richard Upjohn. The first service was attended by the new congregation and several guests including Salmon P. Chase, Jay Cooke, and the Rev Parvin, who was the first rector of St. Paul's of Elkins Park, Pennsylvania, where Jay Cooke was a vestry member. Many of the churches Jay Cooke helped build in Pennsylvania, Ohio and Michigan were named for Saint Paul, which was the name of the church he attended in Philadelphia.

After serving the parish for three years Kendrick moved to larger churches and became the Bishop of the Episcopal Missionary Diocese of Arizona and New Mexico in 1889.

As the only church on the island, the parish served the entire community. Several years later a Roman Catholic congregation was established. Today there are two churches on the island.

The rectory, known as "The Hartman House" is next door at 619 Catawba. The "Hartman House," was built in 1959-1963 replaced the original 1865 rectory. The Hartman house is named for Marylib Vrooman Hartman whose estate made a large contribution to build the house in the 1950s which was matched by the parishioners. The Vrooman family were some of the original merchants on Put-in-Bay.

=== Reformed period ===
From 1869 to 1889 the parish was led by independent ministers.

In the years following the Civil War there arose disagreement over the wording and understanding of the Baptismal Service, leading to the formation of the Reformed Episcopal Church in 1873 by Bishop George David Cummins. Evangelical Episcopalians disturbed by High Church Tractarianism formed their own voluntary societies and continued to work in interdenominational agencies. One of the active supporters of the creation of the Reformed Episcopal Church was St. Paul's rector, the Rev S. R. Weldon.

During the winter of 1868-69, Ohio Bishop Charles P. McIlvaine wrote to the rector with instructions about the form of worship he should have and the vesture he should wear, based on a letter from a fall visitor describing Weldon's inconsistencies with Episcopal practices. The following spring, Weldon chose to leave the Episcopal church instead of following the Bishop's guidance. Prominent member Jay Cooke neither encouraged nor discouraged this, and on June 20, 1869, the church members voted to withdraw from the Episcopal Church and form themselves as a Congregational Church, but continued to worship using the Episcopal Book of Common Prayer. They affiliated with the Reformed Episcopal Church in 1875.

The church returned to the Protestant Episcopal Church in 1912, at the same time Perry's Victory and International Peace Memorial was built. On October 25, 1912 the Episcopal Bishop's visitation marking the return, although the documents formalizing the affiliation were not signed until 1914.

=== Recent history 1916-2012 ===
St. Paul's continues to serve the residents and visitors to South Bass Island. Services are held all year around. The clergy of the parish also minister to residents of North Bass and Middle Bass. In 2011, a labyrinth for prayer and reflection was added to the church property.

== Stained glass ==
St Paul's has a number of stained glass windows from the early 1900s.

A large stained glass window behind the altar was created by Francis D. Sweeney, other were placed in the church by the families of devoted church members.

The "Follow Me" Window (Over the Altar) Matthew 4:19: In 1902 Mrs. Charles D. Barney (Laura L.), daughter of Jay Cooke presented the altar window as a memorial to her mother with this inscription '

"To the Glory of God, and in loving memory of
Dorothea Elizabeth Allen Cooke, Born 1828 died 1871
He saith unto them: Follow Me"

-St. Mat. 4-19.

The grape vine laden with purple grapes and the fishermen with their net were selected based on their role as the products of the island, as well as the symbolic meaning from scripture. The window depicts the scene of Christ's call to the fishermen, showing Him seated beneath a gnarled grape vine bearing fruit near the sea, earnestly conversing with Peter and Andrew, who with their net are sitting in front of Jesus with characteristically eager faces, displaying the impetuosity of the former and the sincerity of the latter as they yield to the Lord's call in the spirit of worldly renunciation. The face of Christ is strikingly beautiful in its ardent earnestness and yearning desire for the partnership with those two fishermen.

The artist, Mrs Frances "Fanny" D Sweeny of Philadelphia who was an instructor of stained glass and proprietor of her own business at the time this was created.

== Wa-Li-Ro ==
In 1933–1970, a summer camp on South Bass Island operated for Episcopal and Anglican choristers. Named Wa-Li-Ro after Ohio Episcopal Bishop, the Right Rev. Warren Lincoln Rogers, thousands of boys from all over the United States participated in the camp that honed their skills as choristers. Their choir practice took place at St. Paul's Episcopal Church. The boys walked to the church from their dormitory to practice twice each day. In addition to the singing the boys spent time canoeing, fishing, swimming and hiking. In later years there was a week set aside for girl choristers as well.

Wa-Li-Ro faculty and directors included many well known composers, choir directors and musicians. Directors included representatives from the Royal School of Church Music (RSCM), among them Gerald Knight, who was the director of the RSCM 1952 to 1972. Paul Allen Beymer was the director of the camp for many years.

Composer and church musician Leo Sowerby made regular trips to the camp for many years. Sowerby was the winner of the Pulitzer Prize for Music in 1946, Each year he wrote an anthem for Wa-Li-Ro. "Themes and Variations (Wa-Li-Ro) H-472 is an organ solo piece still being played. Sowerby died in Port Clinton, Ohio during one of his visits to the Wa-Li-Ro camp.

== Noted members and worshipers ==
- Philip Vroman First settler of Put-in-Bay in 1843 and was a long time member of the Vestry and Senior Warden of this church. There is a stained glass window in his honor, on the eastern wall of the church.
- Mathias Burggraf Jr., a grape grower who served as church treasurer for many years.
- Jay Cooke who supported the church for many years.
- Laura Cooke Barney and her husband Charles D. Barney who supported the church for many years.
- David Allen Jared, attended choir camp at Wa Li Ro two years in a row, 1950 and 1951. Attendees earned "points" for various activities such as making beds, cleaning their plates at meals, never missing a practice session, etc. At end of the camp week, those with a specific "score" were given a Saint Nicholas Medal on a colored ribbon which they could wear on their vestments at their home church thereafter. The ribbon's color depended on how many years one had attended "camp" there.

== Parish records ==
Parish records were transferred for microfilming to the Center for Archival Collections, Bowling Green State University in October 1984, with the cooperation of the Reverend Neilson Rudd who was St Paul's rector at the time. The Bowling Green copies consists of copies of parish record books dating from 1865-1962, which include histories, financial abstracts, lists of communicants, baptisms, marriages, deaths and confirmations, as well as a church constitution and two letters regarding this church's membership in the Ohio Diocese.

Parish Records from 1864 to 1965 can be found in: Grace Luebke Local History Room Material Holdings Harris-Elmore Public Library 328 Toledo Street (P.O. Box 45) Elmore, Ohio 43416 These Records include: Constitution April 10, 1908 Correspondence October 22, 1912, July 30, 1952 Record Book 1865-1962
