= William Self (organist) =

American organist and choirmaster (1906–1998)

William Shuford Self (1906–1998) was an American organist and choirmaster.

William Self was born April 22, 1906, in Lenoir, North Carolina. He studied at The Peabody Institute and New England Conservatory, where he received the Diploma (1926) and Soloist Diploma (1930). He also studied with Joseph Bonnet.

Most of Self’s career was spent at two Episcopal Church congregations: All Saints’ Church, Worcester, Massachusetts (1933–1954) and St. Thomas Episcopal Church, New York (1954–1971).

Along with William Bergsma and William Strickland, he judged the 1956 Church of the Ascension's festival anthem composition competition.

William Self died April 8, 1998.

== Sources ==
- William Self, For Mine Eyes Have Seen (Worcester, Massachusetts: Worcester Chapter of the American Guild of Organists, 1990)

Preceded by T. Frederick Candlyn	Organist & Choirmaster, Saint Thomas Church, New York; 1954–1971	Succeeded by Gerre Hancock
