= Organ Historical Trust of Australia =

Musical instrument organization in Australia

- Founded: May 1977
- Type: National peak body for pipe organ preservation and conservation
- Location: Australia
- Region served: Australia, New Zealand
- Key people: Steve Kaesler OAM (Chairman)
- Website: www.ohta.org.au

The Organ Historical Trust of Australia (OHTA) is a national organisation which works towards:

- the protection, conservation and restoration of pipe organs in Australia,
- the preservation of records pertaining to their history, the promotion of organ repertoire and organ playing to the general public, and
- the encouragement of scholarly research into the history and use of pipe organs and their repertoire.

== Origin and foundation ==
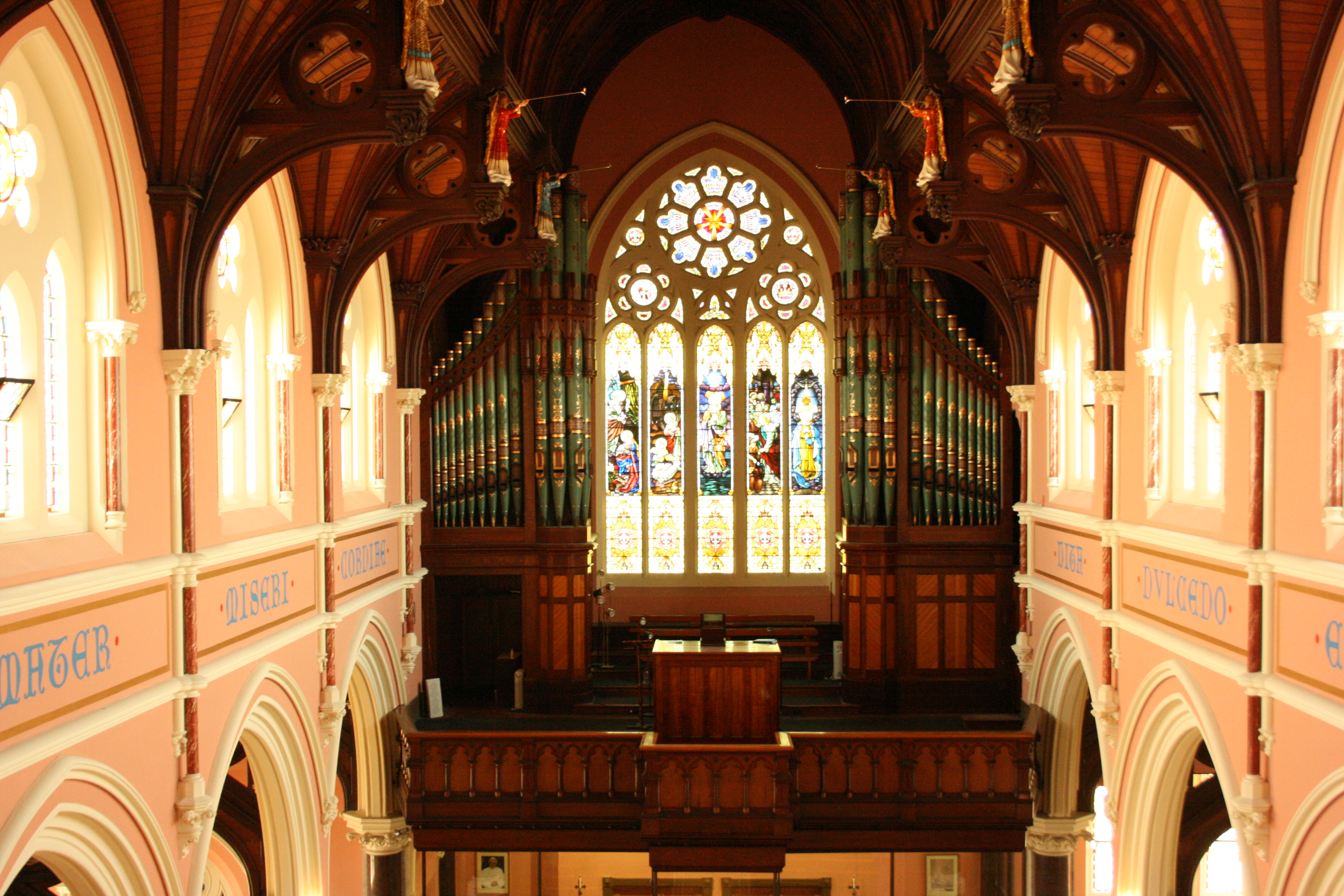
Historic George Fincham organ at St Mary Star of the Sea, West Melbourne, Australia's largest 19th-century instrument still intact

OHTA's establishment in 1977 took place in response to a period following World War II when several significant organs in Australia were either destroyed completely (for example, the Grand Organ erected in 1880 by George Fincham and Son in the Royal Exhibition Building, Melbourne, Victoria}, significantly altered (for example, the organs of St. Andrew's Anglican Cathedral, Sydney, New South Wales, St. John's Anglican Cathedral, Brisbane, Queensland, the 1926 J. E. Dodd organ of St. Francis Xavier's Catholic Cathedral, Adelaide, South Australia and the Pilgrim Uniting (originally Congregational) Church organ, also in Adelaide), or left temporarily or permanently disused while being replaced with electronic or digital organs (for example, St. Joseph's Catholic Church, Newtown, New South Wales, and St. Mary's Anglican Church, Kangaroo Point, a suburb of Brisbane.)

On 13 May 1977, a public meeting was held in the Chapter House of St. Paul's Anglican Cathedral, Melbourne, and OHTA was formed. At the time, the organisation was conceived as a means for extending the work of the National Trust of Australia. In 1978, OHTA was incorporated under the Victorian Companies Act 1961, directed by a Council made up of representatives from each State of Australia, and offering membership to all members of the general public.

== Legal status ==
OHTA is registered with the Australian Government as a Registered Charity recognizing its status as a not-for-profit cultural organization, category: Advancing culture.

== See also ==
Organ Historical Society, a similar organization in America
