= John Scott (organist) =

English organist and choirmaster (1956–2015)

John Scott LVO
- Scott at St Thomas Church, New York, 2014
- Born: 18 June 1956; Wakefield, England
- Died: 12 August 2015 (aged 59); New York City, New York, US
- Occupations: Organist; choirmaster
- Years active: 1978–2015

John Gavin Scott LVO (18 June 1956 – 12 August 2015) was an English organist and choirmaster who reached the highest levels of his profession on both sides of the Atlantic. He directed the Choir of St Paul's Cathedral in London from 1990 to 2004. He then directed the Choir of Men and Boys of Saint Thomas Church on Fifth Avenue in New York City until his death at age 59. Whilst training countless young musicians, he maintained an active career as an international concert performer and recording artist, and was acclaimed as "the premier English organist of his generation".

== Career ==
Born to Hetty (née Murphy) and Douglas Gavin Scott in Wakefield, Yorkshire, John Scott began his musical career as a chorister at Wakefield Cathedral. It was also there that he first learned to play the organ. From 1974 to 1978, he was Organ Scholar at St John's College, Cambridge, assisting George Guest and studying with Jonathan Bielby, Ralph Downes and Gillian Weir.

Upon graduation, he was appointed as Assistant Organist at St Paul's Cathedral and Southwark Cathedral, both in London. After 1985, he worked full-time at St Paul's, which led to his appointment as Organist and Director of Music when Christopher Dearnley retired in 1990. Scott performed at numerous special occasions for the British royal family, including the wedding of Prince Charles and Princess Diana, the 100th birthday of The Queen Mother, and the Golden Jubilee of Queen Elizabeth II. He also served on the organ faculty of the Royal Academy of Music.

In 2004, Scott moved to New York City to succeed Gerre Hancock as Organist and Director of Music at St Thomas Church, Fifth Avenue, home of an internationally renowned choir and the only church-affiliated choir boarding school in North America.

Scott recorded dozens of CDs for labels that included Hyperion, Priory, Decca, Nimbus, Sony, and Chandos. He also compiled chants and psalm texts to publish in The New St Paul's Cathedral Psalter, later reprinted for worldwide distribution as The Anglican Psalter. Highlights of his concert career included the complete organ works of Bach, Buxtehude, Duruflé, Franck, Mendelssohn and Messiaen, and the complete organ symphonies of Vierne and Widor.

== Honours and awards ==
In 1978, Scott won the inaugural Manchester International Organ Competition, and in 1984 he became the first British organist ever to win the International Bach Competition in Leipzig, Germany. In 1998, he was named "International Performer of the Year" by the New York City Chapter of the American Guild of Organists. Queen Elizabeth appointed him as a Lieutenant of the Royal Victorian Order (LVO) in the 2004 New Year Honours, in recognition of his work at St Paul's Cathedral. In 2007, Scott was awarded an honorary doctorate from Nashotah House Theological Seminary. The organ at Saint Thomas Church, built by Dobson Pipe Organ Builders, was posthumously dedicated in his memory.

== Personal life ==
He married Carolyn Jane Lumsden, daughter of organist David Lumsden, on 28 July 1979. They had a son and a daughter before divorcing in June 2010.

Scott married former organist Lily Ardalan on 25 May 2013, and three weeks after his death, their son was born.

== Death ==
In the summer of 2015, at age 59, Scott performed fourteen organ recitals across seven European countries in six weeks. He completed what would become his final concert tour, and returned to New York on 11 August 2015. The next day, he suffered a cardiac episode, was admitted to Roosevelt Hospital, and died there with his wife Lily at his side. St Thomas Church held a public funeral service on 12 September 2015.

== Partial discography ==
Along with numerous industry awards, Scott's many recordings were honoured with two dedicated episodes of the prestigious Pipedreams radio broadcast.

=== Recordings for solo organ ===
Hyperion:

- Mendelssohn: Music for Organ
- The Complete Organ Music by Maurice Duruflé
- Organ Music by Marcel Dupré, Volumes 1–2
- Percy Whitlock

Priory:

- Great Postludes
- Twentieth Century Organ Masterpieces
- John Scott Plays the Organ of St Paul's Cathedral, London
- John Scott Plays the Organ of St Giles' Cathedral, Edinburgh
- The Buzard Organ in All Saints Episcopal Church, Atlanta

Castle:

- Favourite Organ Works

Guild:

- John Scott Plays Liszt

JAV:

- On a Sunday Afternoon, Volume 7

Nimbus:

- William Mathias: Organ Music

=== Recordings with choir ===
Hyperion:

- The English Anthem, Volumes 1–8
- The Psalms of David
- The Music of St Paul's Cathedral
- Music for St Paul's
- Advent at St Paul's
- Epiphany at St Paul's
- Passiontide at St Paul's
- William Croft at St Paul's
- The St Paul's Service and Other Music by Herbert Howells
- Kenneth Leighton: Cathedral Music
- Hear My Prayer
- My Soul Doth Magnify the Lord
- My Spirit Hath Rejoiced
- Praise to the Lord
- Remembrance

Conifer:

- Stainer: the Crucifixion

Decca:

- The Choirboy's Christmas

EMI:

- Carols from St Paul's Cathedral
- How Can I Keep from Singing?

Guild:

- Christmas from St Paul's

Prelude:

- Christmas Music from St Paul's

Pro Organo:

- Christmas on Fifth Avenue
- Easter on Fifth Avenue

Resonus:

- J. S. Bach Motets
- Dancing Day

| Preceded by Christopher Dearnley | Organist and Director of Music, St Paul's Cathedral; 1990–2004 | Succeeded by Malcolm Archer |
| Preceded by Gerre Hancock | Organist and Director of Music, Saint Thomas Church, New York; 2004–2015 | Succeeded by Daniel Hyde |
