= Peter Hurford =

British organist and composer (1930–2019)

- Born: 22 November 1930
- Origin: Great Britain
- Died: 3 March 2019 (aged 88)
- Occupations: Organist and Composer

Peter John Hurford OBE (22 November 1930 – 3 March 2019) was a British organist and composer.

== Life ==
Hurford was born in Minehead, Somerset, to Gladys Hurford (née James) and Hubert Hurford, a solicitor. He was educated at Blundell's School in Tiverton, Devon. He later studied both music and law at Jesus College, Cambridge, graduating with dual degrees, and afterwards obtained a reputation for both musical scholarship and organ playing. Hurford studied with Harold Darke and subsequently studied in Paris under the French organist André Marchal, exploring music of the Baroque period.

He made interpretations of Bach, and recorded the complete Bach organ works for Decca and BBC Radio 3. His expertise also encompassed recordings of the Romantic literature for organ, performances notable for attention to stylistic detail. His playing style is noted for clean articulation, beauty of expression, and a sense of proper tempo.

Hurford was appointed organist of Holy Trinity Church, Leamington Spa from 1956 to 1957. For the same period, he was Music Master at Bablake School, Coventry, and Musical Director of the Royal Leamington Spa Bach Choir. He was then appointed organist and choirmaster of St Albans Cathedral in 1958, serving in this post for twenty years. He conceived the idea of an organ competition in 1963, partly to celebrate the new Harrison & Harrison organ designed by Ralph Downes and himself. This venture was successful mainly because of the young Hurford's rapidly growing stature in Britain and overseas as a result of his refreshing notions of the "authentic performance style". This has grown into the biennial St Albans International Organ Festival, a world-renowned festival of organ music with competitions whose past winners include many of the great names in modern organ music including Dame Gillian Weir, David Sanger, Thomas Trotter and Kevin Bowyer.

Hurford travelled extensively for both his performance and recording career. He was artist in residence at Cincinnati, Ohio University (1967–68), Toronto, Canada (1977), and consultant for the Sydney Opera House organ. He held a number of Honorary Doctorates, was appointed an Honorary Fellow of Jesus College, Cambridge in 2006, was a past President of the Royal College of Organists and received its Medal in 2013, and was an Officer of the Order of the British Empire (OBE). He wrote a book: Making Music on the Organ (1998, Oxford University Press, ISBN 0-19-816207-3) and published a great deal of choral music for the Anglican liturgy, much of it issued by leading publishers such as Novello and Oxford University Press. His Litany to the Holy Spirit, to a famous text by Robert Herrick, is sung worldwide.

Hurford suffered a stroke in 1997, but recovered enough to resume his performing career seven months later. In 2008, he was diagnosed with Alzheimer's disease and subsequently retired from performing in 2009.

Hurford died on 3 March 2019, aged 88. His marriage to Patricia Matthews lasted from 1955 until her death in 2017 and produced three offspring. His survivors include his daughter Heather, his sons Michael and Richard, and nine grandchildren.

== Arranger, Composer, Editor ==
=== Choir ===
- 1958. Litany to the Holy Spirit. Unison.
- 1960. The Holy Son. SATB
- 1962. Magnificat and Nunc dimittis in G. SATB, organ
- 1962. Magnificat and Nunc dimittis in A. SS, organ
- 1962. The Holy Son. TTBB
- 1962. Three short anthems. SS, organ
- 1968. Noel Nouvelet. SATB
- 1971. Bethlehem, of noblest cities. SATB.
- 1971. Magdalen, cease from sobs and sighs. SATB
- 1972. Two Sentences. SATB, organ
- 1972. Communion Service: Series 3. Congregation, SATB, organ
- 1975. Sunny Bank. SATB
- 1976. Come love we God. SATB
- 1976. Two carols for equal voices.
- 1977. O mortal man, remember well. SATB
- 1980. Christ hath a garden. SATB
- 1995. Litany to the Holy Spirit. SATB

=== Organ ===
- 1958. Five short chorale preludes.
- 1958. Paean.
- 1960. A Fancy
- 1960. Five verses on a melody from the Paderborn Gesangbuch (1765).
- 1961. Suite: 'Laudate Dominum'.
- 1961. Meditation.
- 1962. Passingala.
- 1963. Two Dialogues.
- 1970. Fanfare on Old 100th.
- 1970. Prince of Denmark's march (Jeremiah Clarke). Arranged.
- 1976. Trio.
- 1977. Bristol Suite.
- 1977. Nicaea.
- 1977. Sonata in C minor by G. B. Pescetti. Edited.

== Recording artist ==
Hurford made over 50 recordings, both as a solo artist and with multiple other musicians. As well as recording Bach's complete works for the organ, he recorded the organ concertos, op. 7 of Handel with the Concertgebouw Chamber Orchestra.

Cultural offices
| Preceded by Claude Burton | Organist and Master of the Choristers of St Albans Cathedral; 1957–1978 | Succeeded by Stephen Darlington |
