= St Albans Bach Choir =

- Origin: St Albans, Hertfordshire, U.K.
- Genres: Choral
- Instrument: choral
- Years active: 1924–present
- Website: stalbansbachchoir.org.uk

St Albans Bach Choir is an amateur choir based in St Albans. Since its founding in 1924, it has performed a wide range of choral music including but by no means limited to the great Bach masterpieces. It strives for the highest possible standards of music making, employing soloists of the highest calibre and professional orchestras. Performances are normally held in St Albans Cathedral. The Musical Director is William Fox, Director of Music at the Cathedral.

The choir has been conducted by distinguished guest conductors Sir David Willcox, John Rutter CBE, Sir Richard Armstrong and Laurence Cummings.

In October 2018, the choir was recognised as being amongst "9 of The Best UK Choirs".

The choir marked its centenary in 2024 with a season of concerts and the publication of a book about the choir, its history, music and people.

== History and Organisation ==
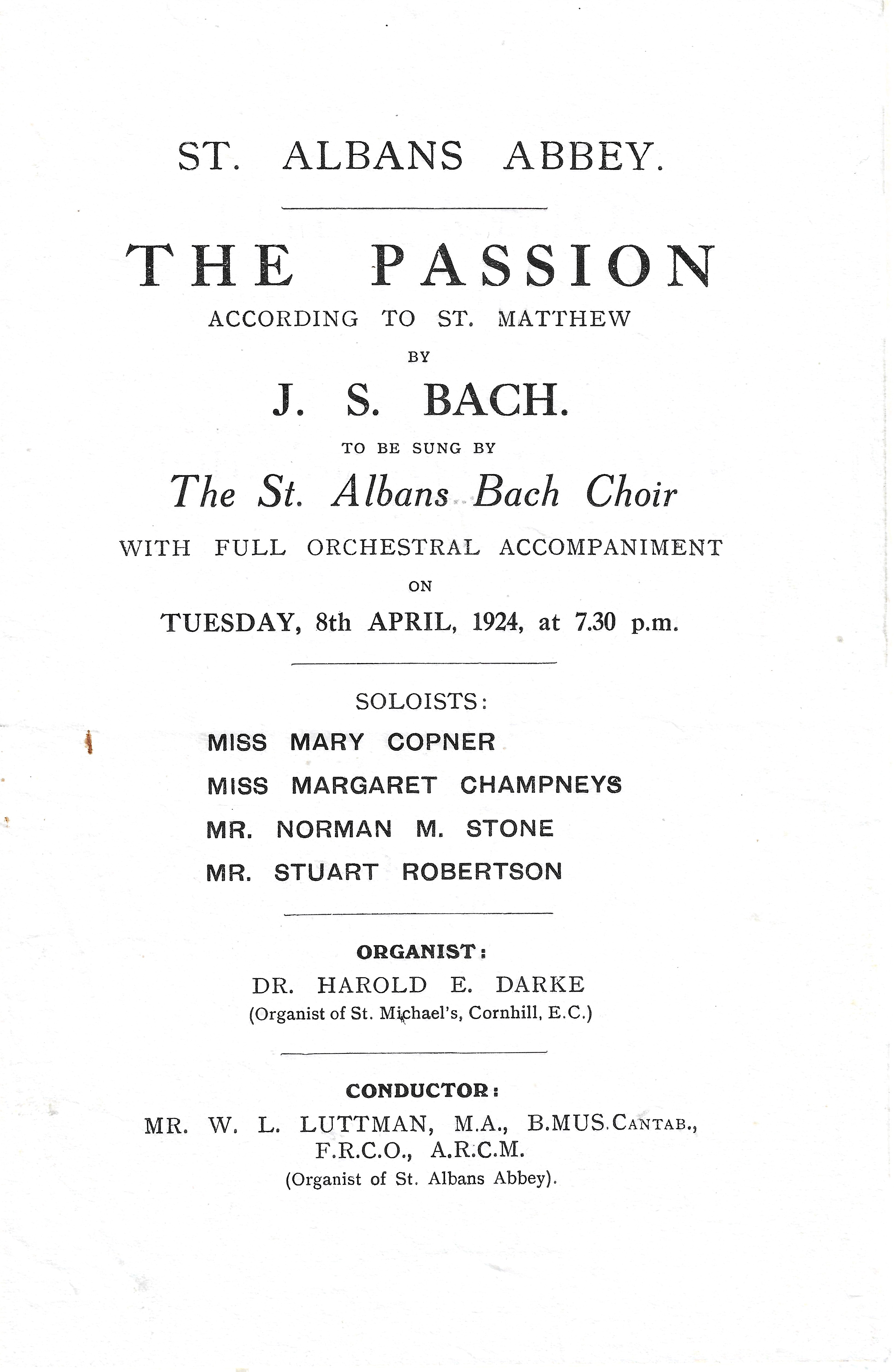
Concert programme for the inaugural concert of the St Albans Bach Choir, 1924

Formed in 1924, the choir's first concert in April of that year consisted of a performance of Bach's St Matthew Passion under Mr Luttman. No concerts were given during the Second World War, but it has performed every year since 1947 up until interrupted by the COVID-19 pandemic. The concert scheduled for March 2020 was cancelled, with no rehearsals or concerts until Autumn 2021.

According to the choir's Constitution, its objectives include the "presentation of public choral concerts to the highest possible standards". In pursuance of this, membership is by audition with periodic re-auditions. In addition, members are required to take periodic individual singing lessons.

The Musical Director is normally the Director of Music at St Albans Cathedral (Andrew Lucas since 1998 and William Fox from Autumn 2024). The choir's President and Vice-President are the Bishop and Dean of St Albans respectively. However, there are no formal links with the Cathedral.

== Concerts and other appearances ==
=== Regular concerts ===
The choir normally gives three main concerts a year in St Albans Cathedral, with professional soloists and orchestra. In alternate years the Summer concert is normally one of the major events in the biennial St Albans International Organ Festival.

For many years, the choir has also presented charity carol concerts in December, which are very popular. A local charity is chosen each year, supported by an afternoon and an evening concert, the former aimed especially at children.

=== Guest conductors ===
In June 2026, Daniel Hyde, Musical Director and Principal Conductor of the City of London Choir, conducted the choir in a performance of The Dream of Gerontius by Elgar.

In July 2025, internationally recognised conductor Paul Daniel CBE conducted the choir together with the Choir of King's College London in performances of Beethoven's 9th Symophony and Brahms' Alto Rhapsody.

In 2019, Howard Blake himself conducted his Benedictus.

In July 2017, Laurence Cummings, Musical Director of the London Handel Festival, conducted the choir in a performance of Handel's Messiah.

In July 2013, Sir Richard Armstrong conducted the choir in a performance of Britten's War Requiem.

In November 2011, in April 2019 and November 2023, the choir performed John Rutter's Requiem, conducted on both occasions by the composer.

In 1987, Sir David Willcocks conducted the choir in the world premier of the final revised version of Howard Blake's Benedictus.

== Repertoire ==
Whilst a core component of the choir's repertoire includes J. S. Bach's three major choral works (St Matthew Passion, St John Passion and Mass in B minor), one of which is traditionally performed roughly every 2 years, it also extends from Monteverdi (Vespers of 1610, last performed in 1974) to the late 20th Century.

Notable concerts from recent years have included:

- Dvořák Stabat Mater (2017)
- Handel Messiah (2014) conducted by Laurence Cummings (Musical Director of the London Handel Festival)
- Britten War Requiem (2013) conducted by Sir Richard Armstrong
- John Rutter Requiem (2011 and 2019) conducted by the composer
- Orff Carmina Burana (2019)
- Fanshaw African Sanctus (2006) with the composer taking part.

== Commissioned works ==
In 2006, the choir gave the first performance of Tenebrae by Joseph Phibbs, which was commissioned by the choir.

== Other First Performances ==
In 1987, the choir gave the first performance of the final revised version of Howard Blake Benedictus, conducted by Sir David Willcocks.

In 2019 the choir gave the first performance of Walking in the Air by Howard Blake in a new arrangement with choral backing. The soloist was Peter Auty, the treble soloist in the film version, now a tenor.

== Music Directors ==
The following is a list of music directors since the choir's founding:

- Willie Lewis Luttman (1924–1930)
- C E Osmond (1931)
- Albert Tysoe (1938–1945)
- Meredith Davies (1947–1949)
- Peter Burton (1950–1957)
- Peter Hurford (1958–1978)
- Stephen Darlington (1978–1985)
- Colin Walsh (1985–1988)
- Barry Rose (1989–1997)
- Andrew Lucas (1998–2024)
- William Fox (since Autumn 2024)
