= St Albans Cathedral Choir =

English cathedral choir

- Choir
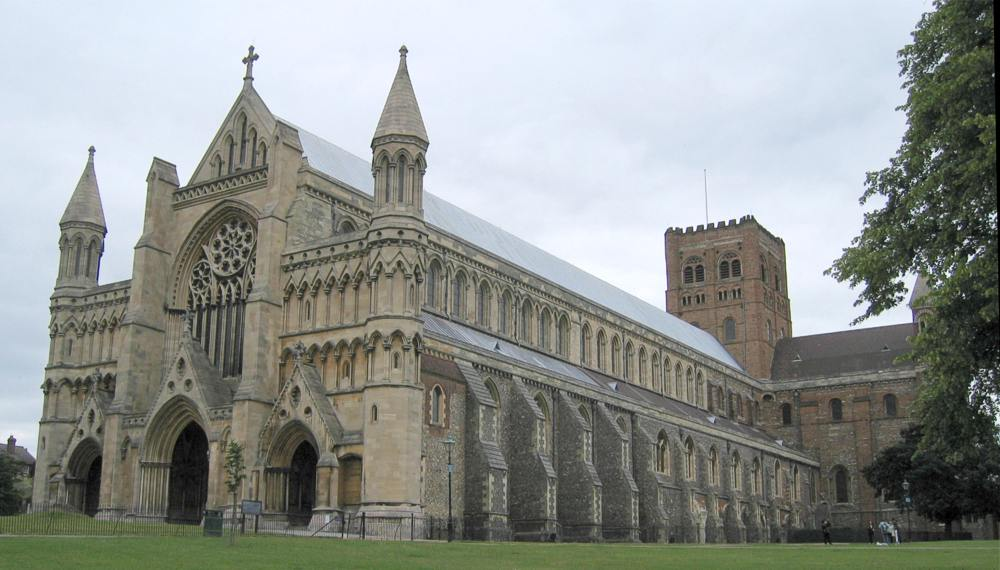
- St Albans Cathedral
- Members: ~20 boy choristers aged 7–14; 12 adult Lay Clerks; 26 girl choristers aged 7–14
- Music director: William Fox (New Director of the Music)
- Headquarters: Sumpter Yard, Holywell Hill, St Albans
- Affiliation: St Albans Cathedral
- Website: stalbanscathedral.org

St Albans Cathedral Choir is an English cathedral choir based in St Albans, Hertfordshire, England. It is made up of:

- around 12 adults lay clerks.
- 20 boys choristers aged 7–14
- in addition to the original boys-only choir, there is a St Albans Cathedral Girls' Choir (originally the Abbey Girls' Choir) founded in 1996.

They are directed by William Fox, the Director of Music at the cathedral, and accompanied in services by Conor McGlone, the cathedral's Organ scholar or the Assistant Director of Music, Dewi Rees.

== Schedule ==
St Albans has a strong musical tradition. For example, it hosts the St Albans International Organ Festival. However, unlike many cathedrals, St Albans does not have a boarding school for its choristers. The choirs have strong links with many local day schools, including St Albans School and St Columba's College, meaning that services and rehearsals have to be fitted around a normal school week.

Choristers are expected to sing at the Cathedral both before and after school on Tuesdays and Thursdays, on which days Choral Evensong is sung, and before school on Mondays, in addition to an after-school rehearsal on Fridays and the commitment of up to three services over the weekend. A typical week will involve around 14-16 hours of singing, and over his 4 to 7 year career (depending on when the person joins) in the Choir a Chorister will spend approximately six months' worth of that singing in the cathedral.

== Touring ==
The Choir goes on tours to other countries every other year to perform concerts, with past tours including the United States, France, the Netherlands, Italy, Germany and, in 2017, Spain, during which it performed concerts in Segovia, Madrid and Alcalá de Henares, and sang at a service in the Church of San Andrés in Madrid. In May 2019 it toured Italy, with performances given in Pesaro and Fano Cathedrals, the Church of San Paulo in Fano, and Mass at the Basilica di Loreto. In May 2025, the Boy's Choir went to Cologne, William Fox's first choir tour.

== Traditions ==
The annual Choir Camp was founded by Peter Hurford when he was organist at St Albans and held in the hamlet of Luccombe. The tents used by the Choir remained the same since the first Choir Camp in 1958, with most being army surplus from the Second World War. On the Sunday the Choir would sing Choral Eucharist in St Mary's, Luccombe for the parishioners, and on each day the choristers and Lay Clerks would go on hikes, often over ten miles in length, around the Somerset countryside. The Camp celebrated its 50th anniversary in 2008.

The Choir also holds an annual cricket match and football match using the grounds of local schools and parks. The games are played between the two 'sides' of the Choir, known in the English choral tradition as Decani and Cantoris.

== Organists ==
The Choir is directed by the Master of the Music. The Assistant Master of the Music is currently Dewi Rees. The current Organ Scholar is Connor McGlone.

=== Masters of the Music ===
- 1302 Adam
- 1498 Robert Fayrfax
- 1529 Henry Besteney
- 1820 Thomas Fowler
- 1831 Edwin Nicholls
- 1833 Thomas Fowler
- 1837 Thomas Brooks
- 1846 John Brooks
- 1855 William Simmons
- 1858 John Stocks Booth
- 1880 George Gaffe
- 1907 Willie Lewis Luttman
- 1930 Cuthbert E. Osmond
- 1937 Albert Charles Tysoe
- 1947 Meredith Davies
- 1951 Claude Peter Primrose Burton
- 1957 Peter Hurford
- 1978 Stephen Darlington
- 1985 Colin Walsh
- 1988 Barry Rose
- 1998 Andrew Lucas
- 2024 William Fox

=== Assistant Masters of the Music ===
The assistant Master of Music at St Albans may also be the Master of Music at St Albans School. For example, John Rutter's Donkey Carol is dedicated "to Simon Lindley and the choir of St. Albans School".

- 1908–09 John Cawley
- 1921–30 George C. Straker
- 1936–39 Sydney John Barlow
- 1948–51 Frederick Carter
- 1951–70 John Henry Freeman
- 1970–75 Simon Lindley
- 1975–76 John Clough
- 1976–2001 Andrew Parnell
- 2001–08 Simon Johnson
- 2008–24 Tom Winpenny
- 2024-2025 Ben Collyer
- 2025-present Dewi Rees

== Notable ex-choristers ==
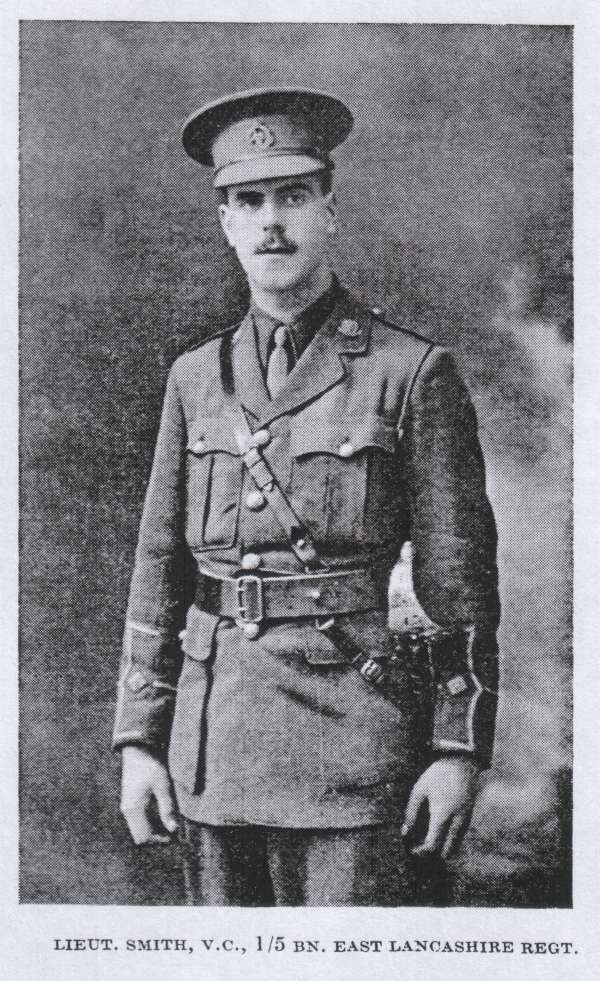
Alfred Victor Smith VC Croix de Guerre (1891–1915)

- Rod Argent (born 1945) – pop musician, founding member of The Zombies and writer of international hits including "She's Not There", "Tell Her No" and "Time of the Season"
- Rogers Covey-Crump (born 1944) – tenor
- Mike Newell (born 1942) – film director
- Alfred Victor Smith VC Croix de Guerre (1891–1915) – recipient of both the Victoria Cross and the Croix de Guerre
- Julian Trevelyan (born 1998) – concert pianist

== Trivia ==
St Albans Cathedral Choir appeared in the 2003 film Johnny English, starring Rowan Atkinson and John Malkovich, as the choir of Westminster Abbey during the coronation scene. The choir later appeared in Dodger starring Christopher Ecclestone during the coronation scene.

== Performances ==
St Albans Cathedral Choir most notably hosts the Three Choirs Concert, a key part of the St Albans International Organ Festival. Since 2015, the Choir has accomplished three BBC Radio 3 broadcasts and has performed in two BBC One television programmes. It has performed with several world-famous choirs, the most recent examples being the 2017 Three Choirs Concert, when it performed jointly with St Paul's Cathedral Choir and Temple Church Choir, and the 2019 Three Choirs Concert, with the Chapel Choir of Jesus College, Cambridge and the choirs of Salisbury Cathedral.
