= Monique Gendron =

Canadian organist

Monique Gendron is a Canadian organist of international renown. She won first prize at the St Albans International Organ Festival in England and at the Grand Prix of Chartes in France. She has recorded sonatas by Johann Sebastian Bach and George Frideric Handel with oboist Bernard Jean and has performed in concert series presented by Les Amis de l'orgue de Québec. She has performed in concerts and recitals throughout North America and Europe. She currently teaches on the faculties at the Conservatoire de musique du Québec à Hull and the Académie de musique du Québec.

Born in Montréal, Gendron earned a bachelor's degree from Université de Montréal and a premiere prix in organ performance from the Conservatoire de musique du Québec à Montréal. In 1956 she won a scholarship from Les Amis de l'art and she won the John Robb Organ Competition in 1963 1963, as well as in 1966. In 1966 she was awarded the Prix d'Europe which enabled her to pursue graduate studies in France at the École Normale de Musique de Paris where she earned a Master of Music. She also holds a diploma in organ performance from the University of Vienna. Some of her teachers are Marie-Claire Alain, Anton Heiller, and Michael Radulescu.
