= National Sunday Law =

National Sunday Law may refer to:

- Blue laws in predominantly Christian countries
- Sunday Sabbatarian ecclesiastical laws in certain national Christian denominations
- National Sunday Law, a book by Seventh-day Adventist author Jan Marcussen
