= Organ Symphony No. 3 =

Organ Symphony No. 3 may refer to:

- Organ Symphony No. 3 (Vierne)
- Symphony No. 3 (Saint-Saëns) or Organ Symphony
