= David Sanger =

David Sanger is the name of:

- David Sanger (organist) (1947–2010), British concert organist
- David Sanger (drummer), member of the American country music group Asleep at the Wheel
- David E. Sanger (born 1960), American journalist with The New York Times
