= Jan Kleinbussink =

Dutch classical musician (born 1946)

Jan Kleinbussink (born 1946) is a Dutch classical musician who specializes in the performance of old music. He is the cantor-organist of the Central Church in Deventer, also known as the Lebuïnus Church. He is also well known for his contributions as an instrumentalist and conductor to recordings of J.S. Bach, Buxtehude, Charpentier, Graupner, Händel, W.A. Mozart, and Telemann.

Kleinbussink studied piano, organ, orchestra and choir conducting, composition and music theory at three Dutch conservatoires: Amsterdam, Deventer and Rotterdam. After graduating he continued his specialization in baroque and renaissance music with Anton Heiller, Philippe Herreweghe, and Ton Koopman.

During the 1970s he was also active as a composer. Kleinbussink taught music theory at the Rotterdam Conservatoire and performance at the Royal Conservatory of The Hague. In 2007 he was included in the Dutch Order of Orange-Nassau.
