= David Rumsey (organist) =

- Born: David Rumsey; 30 March 1939; Sydney
- Died: 12 February 2017 (aged 77); Basel, Switzerland
- Education: Newington College; Sydney Conservatorium of Music
- Occupation: Organist

David Edward Rumsey (30 March 1939 – 12 February 2017) was an Australian-born organist and composer.

He was born in Sydney, attended Newington College, and studied organ with Norman Johnston at the Sydney Conservatorium of Music, where he would later also teach.

Graduating in 1963, he moved to Europe to study with Marie-Claire Alain in Paris, and then with Anton Heiller in Vienna.

In 1966 he returned to Australia together with fellow Heiller student, Christa Brosch – they married and had two daughters, Stella and Marie. In 1968 he was artistic director of the first Adelaide organ festival.

He married Elizabeth Jones in 1998 and they moved together to Basel, Switzerland, in 2000. Rumsey died in Basel in 2017, aged 77.
