= Samuel Kummer =

German church organist (1968–2024)

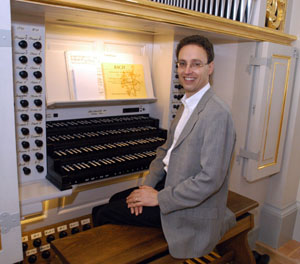
- Kummer at the organ console of the Frauenkiche, 2009
- Born: 28 February 1968; Stuttgart, Baden-Württemberg, West Germany
- Died: 23 April 2024 (aged 56); Dresden, Saxony, Germany
- Education: State University of Music and Performing Arts Stuttgart
- Occupations: Organist; Academic teacher
- Organizations: Frauenkirche, Dresden; Hochschule für Kirchenmusik Dresden
- Awards: Diapason d'Or; Preis der deutschen Schallplattenkritik
- Website: www.samuelkummer.de

Samuel Kummer (28 February 1968 – 23 April 2024) was a German organist, from 2005 to 2022 at the Frauenkirche in Dresden. When he took the position at the restored church, destroyed by bombing in World War II, with a new Kern organ, he programmed a first recital with music by Bach, Brahms, Reger, Louis Vierne and his own. In concerts and in church services, he was particularly known for his improvisations. He played concerts internationally and made award-winning recordings. He taught at the Hochschule für Kirchenmusik Dresden from 2007.

== Life and career ==
=== Early life and education ===
Kummer was born in Stuttgart on 28 February 1968. He studied church music at the State University of Music and Performing Arts Stuttgart, organ with Christoph Bossert, Werner Jacob and Ludger Lohmann, and specifically organ improvisation with Willibald Bezler, Hans Martin Corrinth and Wolfgang Seifen. He took master classes with Marie-Claire Alain, Hans Fagius, Lorenzo Ghielmi, Olivier Latry and Jean-Claude Zehnder. He passed his A exam in 1997 with a distinction in improvisation.

=== International concerts and first church position ===
Kummer performed in concert from 1988, in Europe, the Americas and Japan. He played in concert series including the European Organ Festival in Maastricht, where in 1996 he won the first prize in the Concours L'Europe et L'Orgue, and the International Bach Festival in Warsaw. He gave concerts at the Cologne Cathedral, Riga Cathedral, the Tabernacle in Salt Lake City, Saint Petersburg Philharmonia, and Suntory Hall in Tokyo. He played several times at the Guatemala Cathedral, where he supported the restoration of the 1937 Walcker organ in 1999.

In 1998 Kummer was appointed a Lutheran district church musician (Bezirkskantor) in Kirchheim unter Teck. During his tenure he conducted several oratorios, including Frank Martin's In terra pax. He instituted a concert series, Orgelmusik zur Marktzeit (Organ music at market time), and played the complete organ works of Johann Sebastian Bach.

On 11 May 2016, the centenary of Max Reger's death, he played Reger's Variationen und Fuge über ein Originalthema, Op. 73, at the Konzerthaus Dortmund, broadcast live by WDR.

=== Frauenkirche, Dresden ===
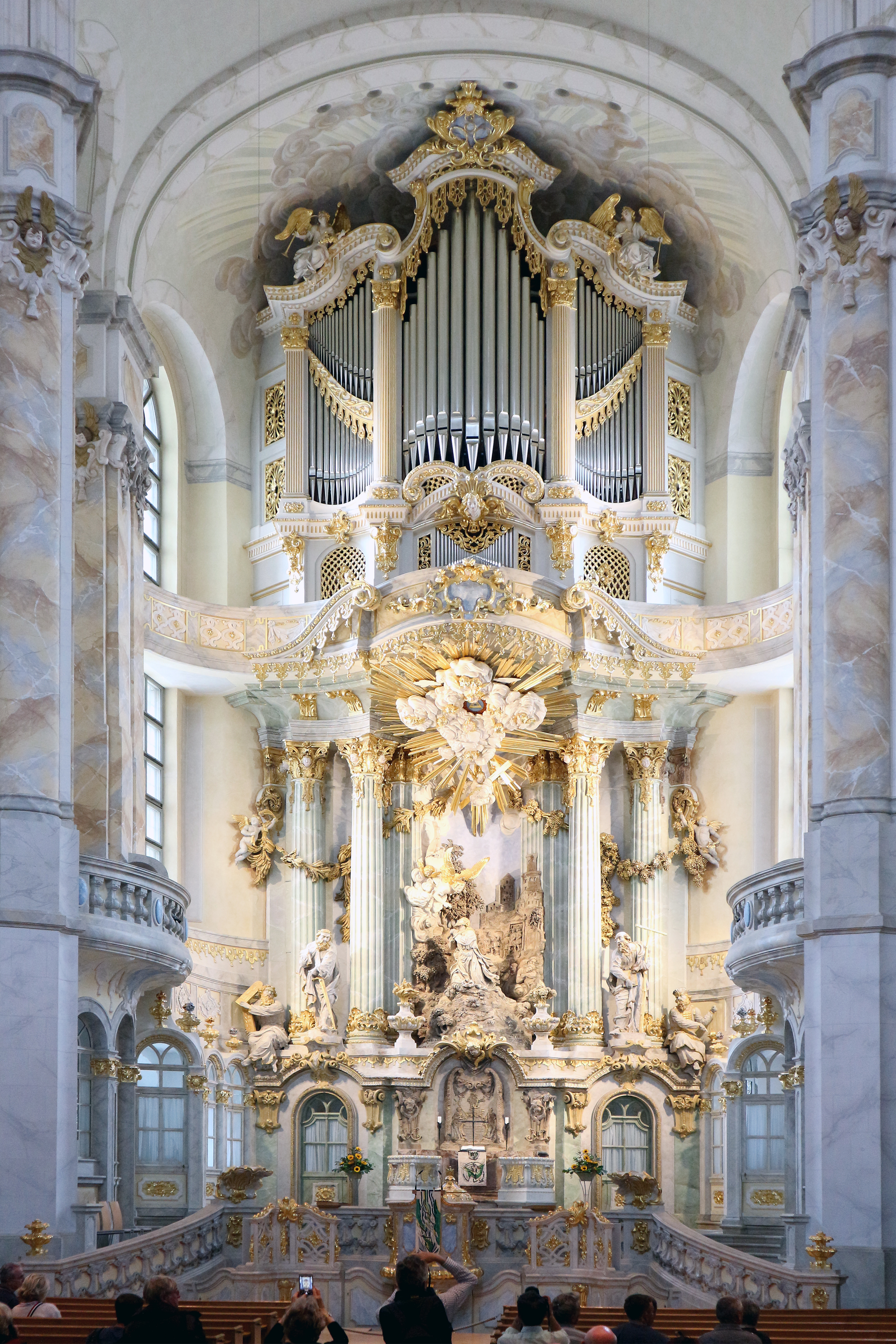
Kern organ of the Frauenkirche

In 2005, Kummer was appointed the organist at the Frauenkirche in Dresden, when the church was reopened after the completion of its restoration from destruction in World War II. The restoration included a new Kern organ, an instrument for all musical styles, instead of the church's Baroque Silbermann organ. For his inaugural recital, Kummer chose music by Bach, Brahms, Reger, Louis Vierne and his own composition. He shaped the profile of music there in many regular services, according to the church adding "depth and spirituality" by his playing, especially in improvisation. He co-founded a concert series, Dresdner Orgelzyklus (Dresden Organ Cycle), which includes performances on the organs of three churches in Dresden, the Kreuzkirche, the Hofkirche, and the Frauenkirche. In addition he performed as organ soloist at the Frauenkirche in orchestral works including the Organ Symphony by Saint-Saëns with the Staatskapelle Dresden and Joseph Jongen's Symphonie Concertante with the Chemnitz Philharmonic in 2007.

From 2007, Kummer was also a dozent for organ repertoire, liturgical performance and improvisation at the Hochschule für Kirchenmusik Dresden.

Kummer was dismissed from the Frauenkirche in 2022 with stated reasons of unreliability and unpunctuality. Music journalist Claus Fischer of the MDR commented at the time that Kummer was perhaps more an artist than an organiser, and thus not ideally suited to the position.

=== Personal life ===
Kummer was married to Irena Renata Budrytė-Kummer. He died on 23 April 2024, at the age of 56. According to his family, he collapsed at Dresden Main Station on his way to teaching in Würzburg, where he had been appointed to a summer position at the Hochschule für Musik.

== Recordings ==
Kummer recorded a CD with organ music by Bach and Duruflé for Carus in 2005, the first CD recorded at the Frauenkirche, to critical acclaim. In 2007, he recorded Louis Vierne's Organ Symphonies Nos. 3 and 5, beginning a complete recording of the composer's organ works following the new edition by Carus. It was awarded a Diapason d'Or.

In 2020 he recorded Bach's The Art of Fugue at the organ of St. Wenzel in Naumburg, built by Zacharias Hildebrandt; the instrument was approved in 1748 by Bach and Silbermann and is the largest extant organ that Bach is known to have played. A reviewer wrote:

Kummer takes great care, as the music progresses and the registrations become more imposing, to maintain clarity at all times in the contrapuntal lines. Never did I hear definition lost at any time throughout. He revels in the textures of the denser fugues, such as Contrapunctus 11 a 4, emphasizing the more subtle lines. Registration choices show ingenuity and resourcefulness. In short, Kummer displays a great maturity of vision.

The recording was awarded the Preis der deutschen Schallplattenkritik.
