= Stephen Darlington =

British choral director and conductor

Stephen Darlington MBE
- Born: 21 September 1952 (age 74)
- Education: King's School, Worcester; Christ Church, Oxford
- Occupations: Choral conductor, organist
- Known for: Assistant organist, Canterbury Cathedral; Master of the Music, St Albans Cathedral Choir; Music director, International Organ Festival; Organist and tutor in music, Christ Church, Oxford (1985–2018); President, Royal College of Organists (1999–2001)
- Relatives: Jonathan Darlington (brother)

Stephen Mark Darlington MBE (born 21 September 1952) is a British choral director, organist and conductor who served as Director of Music at Christ Church, Oxford, from 1985 to 2018. After retiring from Christ Church, he served as interim director at St John’s College, Cambridge. His brother is the conductor Jonathan Darlington.

== Education and career ==
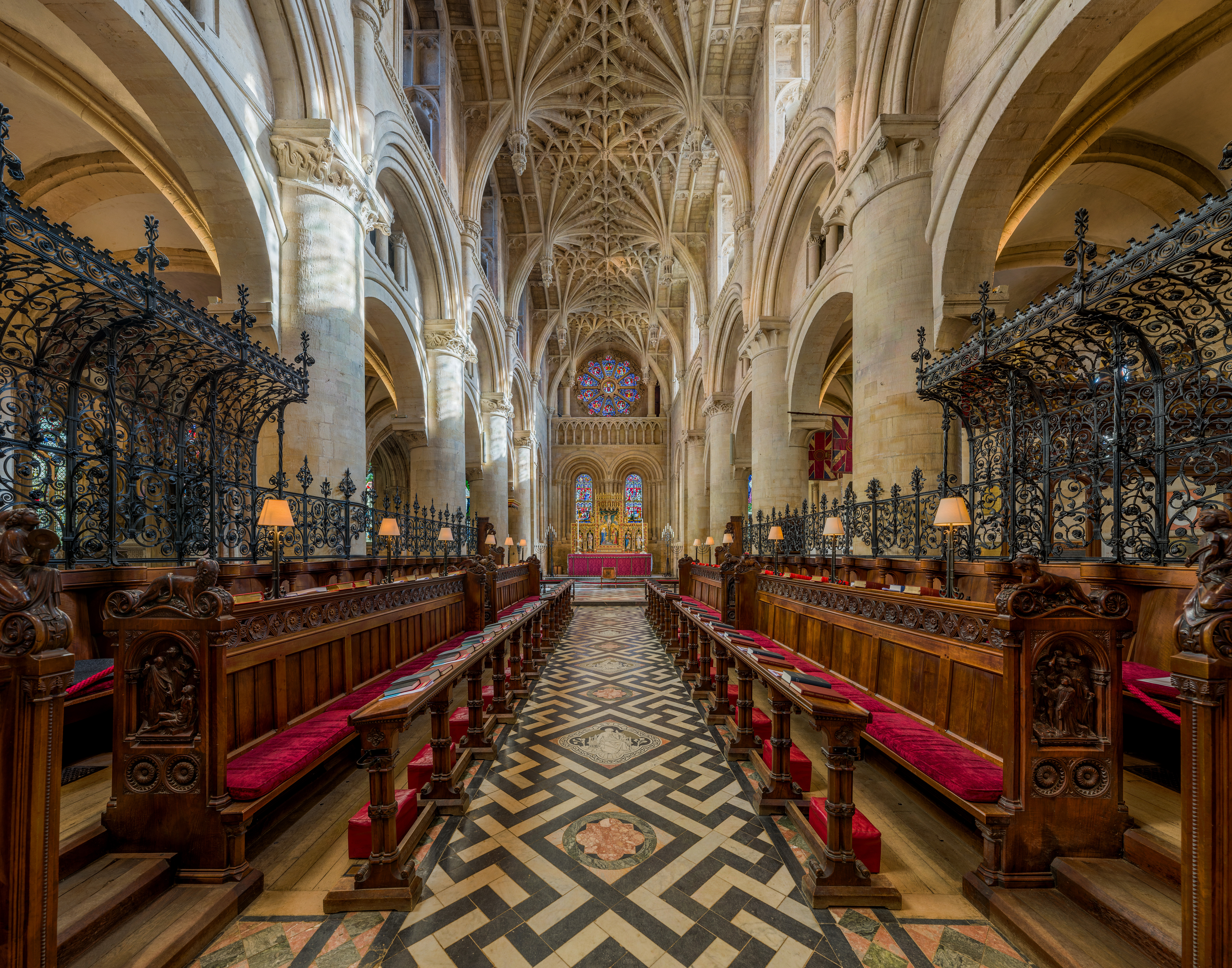
The choir stalls at Christ Church Cathedral, Oxford, where Darlington was Director of Music for 33 years.

After attending King's School, Worcester, Darlington was an organ scholar at Christ Church, Oxford, in the early 1970s, studying under Simon Preston. Afterwards he was appointed assistant organist at Canterbury Cathedral, where he served for four years before becoming Master of the Music for St Albans Cathedral Choir. At St Albans he also directed the International Organ Festival.

In 1985 Darlington returned to Christ Church, Oxford, as Director of Music and tutor of music, holding the post for 33 years until his retirement in 2018.

In 2021 he became interim Director of Music at St John's College, Cambridge, following the appointment of Andrew Nethsingha as organist of Westminster Abbey. He served until 2023.

== Concerts and recordings ==
Darlington has travelled internationally both with the choir and as an organist and conductor, directing, among others, the Australian Brandenburg Orchestra, the London Mozart Players, the English Chamber Orchestra, the Northern Sinfonia, the Hanover Band, the English String Orchestra and the London Musici. The Christ Church choir sang under his direction with Plácido Domingo, José Carreras, James Bowman and others. He also collaborated with contemporary composers including John Tavener and Howard Goodall. He conducted Goodall's theme music for The Vicar of Dibley and was featured in Goodall's ChoirWorks and OrganWorks series.

His recorded works amount to over 60 albums, several of which have won awards and other forms of recognition such as Gramophone recommendations.

== Awards and recognition ==
Darlington was Choragus of the University of Oxford and holds a Lambeth Doctorate. He served as President of the Royal College of Organists from 2000 to 2002. He is an honorary member of the Royal Academy of Music, a Fellow of the Royal School of Church Music and an honorary canon of Christ Church Cathedral, Oxford. Darlington was appointed a Member of the Order of the British Empire (MBE) in the 2019 New Year Honours for services to music.

Cultural offices
Preceded by Peter Hurford	Organist and Master of the Choristers of St Albans Cathedral; 1978–1985	Succeeded by Colin Walsh
Preceded by Francis Grier	Organist and Master of the Choristers of Christ Church Cathedral, Oxford; 1985–2018	Succeeded by Steven Grahl
