= David Drury (musician) =

Australian church organist (born 1961)

David Drury (born 1961) is a church organist in Sydney, Australia. He was formerly organist at St James' Church, Sydney, and has given recitals in Westminster Abbey, St Paul's and Westminster cathedrals in London, King's College, Cambridge, and Notre Dame and La Madeleine in Paris.

Drury attended Trinity Grammar School, Sydney, and graduated with a B.Mus from the Sydney Conservatorium in 1984. Drury won the 1987 Improvisation Competition at the St Albans International Organ Festival.

He has released four solo recordings as well as recordings with the Sydney Symphony Orchestra and Cantillation.

He has been director of music at St Paul's College, University of Sydney since 1992. He is organist-in-residence at Christ Church Cathedral, Newcastle.
