= Ralph Downes =

British organist and organ designer (1904–1993)

- Born: Ralph William Downes; 16 August 1904; Derby
- Died: 24 December 1993 (aged 89)
- Education: Royal College of Music
- Occupations: Organist, Professor of Organ in the Royal College of Music

Ralph William Downes CBE, KSG (16 August 1904 – 24 December 1993) was an English organist, organ designer, teacher and music director and was Professor of Organ in the Royal College of Music.

== Biography ==
Downes was born in Derby and studied at the Royal College of Music from 1922 to 1923 under Walter Alcock, Henry Ley, and Edgar Cook. He was then assistant organist at Southwark Cathedral from 1923 until 1925, before moving to Keble College, Oxford (where he was also Organ Scholar to continue his education (1925 to 1928)). He was then musical director and organist at the E.M. Skinner organ of the new chapel at Princeton University between 1928 and 1935, before returning to London.

During his time in America, Downes was influenced by the organ builder G. Donald Harrison and the harpsichordist Ralph Kirkpatrick, and other baroque music performers. These influences persisted on his return to London, where he was appointed as organist of the London Oratory (a post he would hold from 1936 to 1977). His recitals and broadcasts were known for their use of historical performance styles, which was uncommon at the time. He gave first performances on British soil of organ pieces by composers such as Darius Milhaud, Paul Hindemith and Arnold Schoenberg. He was the only instrumentalist whom Benjamin Britten invited to perform at every Aldeburgh Festival in Britten's lifetime.

In 1948, he was commissioned to design the organ for the Royal Festival Hall. When the organ was first unveiled in 1954, it caused some controversy, but it proved to be the beginning of what is now perceived as the classical reform movement in organ design, leaving behind the vast edifices of Victorian civic instruments in favour of a simpler and more cohesive sound, more characteristic of the Baroque era. Although the final result was still not wholly to his taste, lacking in some tonal colours which he would have preferred, it clearly pointed the way to the "modern" British organs such as those built by Grant, Degens and Bradbeer (see New College Oxford) and Mander. Downes helped execute the rebuilding of many famous organs, including St Albans Cathedral (in 1963) and Gloucester Cathedral (in 1971).

He was Professor of Organ in the Royal College of Music from 1954 to 1975 and was regarded as the leading organ teacher of his day. His influence on students such as Dame Gillian Weir, Thomas Trotter, John Scott and Roucher du Toit is a matter of record. He also taught Trevor Pinnock. It was Downes who urged Weir to compete in the prestigious St Albans International Organ Festival at St Albans, where she took first prize. Downes visited the Festival numerous times.

Recordings of Downes at the organ are still available, notably those with Benjamin Britten and Peter Pears. He recorded Bach's organ music to acclaim. Many of his recordings were made on the Royal Festival Hall organ, however he also recorded at the London Oratory, where he designed the Grand Organ built by JW Walker. He wrote about his organ design philosophy in Baroque Tricks (Positif, Oxford, 1983).

He was appointed CBE in 1969. In 1970 he was made a Papal Knight of the Order of St Gregory the Great. He died in 1993. The organ was silent at his funeral, at his request, to make way for Gregorian chant of which he had grown fond following his conversion to Catholicism.

His son was the distinguished architectural historian Kerry Downes (1930-2019).
