= Organ Symphony No. 3 (Vierne) =

Organ symphony by Louis Vierne

Troisième symphonie pour grand orgue
- Organ symphony by Louis Vierne
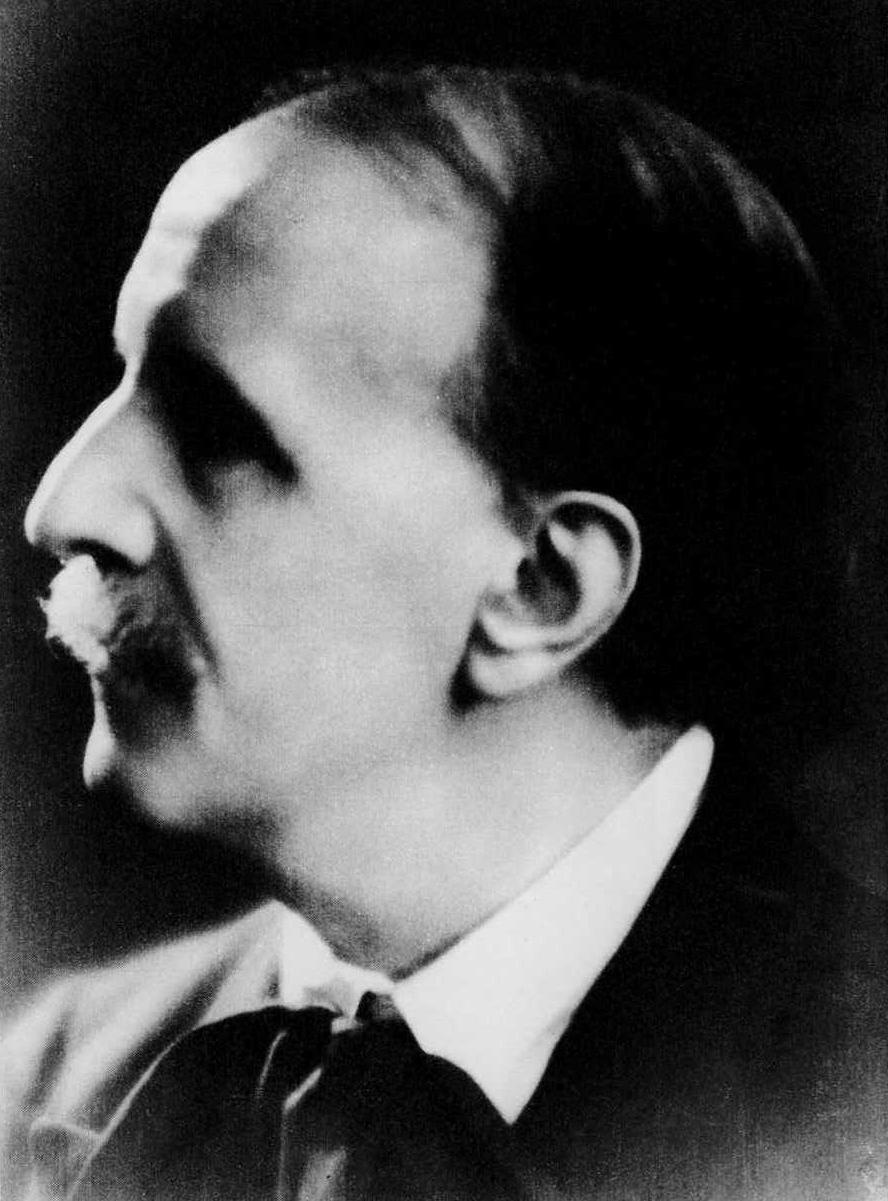
- The composer in 1910
- English: Organ Symphony No. 3
- Key: F-sharp minor
- Opus: 28
- Composed: 1911
- Dedication: Marcel Dupré
- Performed: March 1912
- Published: 1912
- Duration: 30 minutes
- Movements: 5

The Organ Symphony No. 3 (Troisième symphonie pour grand orgue) in F-sharp minor, Op. 28, is an organ symphony by Louis Vierne. He composed it in 1911, and it was first performed in March 1912. It was first published by Éditions Durand the same year. It has been described as the most inspired and best structured of his six organ symphonies.

== History ==
Vierne, organist at Notre-Dame de Paris, continued the French tradition of secular organ symphonies, such as the works by his teacher Charles-Marie Widor, who had established the organ as a concert instrument. Widor was inspired by the organs built by Aristide Cavaillé-Coll.

Vierne composed the third organ symphony in 1911, beginning on 18 March. He completed it on 14 September during summer vacation which he spent with the family of Marcel Dupré in Saint-Valery-en-Caux, Normandy. He dedicated it to Dupré, who played the world premiere at the Salle Gaveau of Paris in March 1912. It was first published by Éditions Durand that year. Carus-Verlag published a critical edition of the complete organ works by Vierne in 2007, edited by Jon Laukvik and David Sanger.

== Structure and music ==
The work is structured in five movements:

1. Allegro maestoso
2. Cantilène
3. Intermezzo
4. Adagio
5. Final

The first movement begins with "an aggressive call to arms" in "jagged rhythmic edges" which dominate the movement in sonata form. The rhythm is reminiscent of the French overture with a more lyrical second subject, skillfully combined with the first in the development section, with significant chromaticism.

The second movement is soft in contrast, with long melodic hautbois phrases. The third movement has scherzo character in a triple metre, which can be seen as grotesque or playful. A second theme comes with a pizzicato bass. The fourth movement is marked "Quasi largo", and is homophonic and soft like the second, but using chromaticism reminiscent of Wagner. A "declamatory melody" in a middle section seems endless. When the opening theme returns, it is developed further. Vierne adapted this movement in his Piece symphonique for organ and orchestra in 1926, in preparation of a U.S. concert tour.

The Final features typical elements of a French toccata, such as fast ostinato passages for the manuals versus a slow melody in the bass, but also uses counterpoint. It is again in sonata form, with an augmented bass in the development, and culminates in a coda with virtuoso pedal.

== Recordings ==
- Bruno Mathieu, 1996
- Jeremy Filsell, organ of Abbaye de Saint-Ouen, Rouen, 2005
- David Briggs, organ of Basilica of Saint-Sernin, Toulouse, 2008
- Samuel Kummer, Kern organ of Frauenkirche Dresden, Carus-Verlag
