= Kerry Downes =

English architectural historian (1930–2019)

Kerry John Downes OBE FSA (8 December 1930 – 11 August 2019) was an English architectural historian whose speciality was English Baroque architecture. He was Professor of History of Art, University of Reading, 1978–91, then Emeritus.

== Early life and education ==
Kerry Downes was born in Princeton, New Jersey on 8 December 1930 to Ralph Downes CBE KSG (1904–1993) and Agnes Mary Downes (née Rix). His father was the musical director at Princeton University's new chapel. The family returned to London, where in 1936 Ralph became the organist at the Brompton Oratory.

Kerry was educated at St Benedict's School, Ealing. He became fascinated by architecture and the history of art, and would cycle into London to visit churches and photograph them using a wooden quarter plate camera.

His art teacher, Michael Franks, encouraged his interest and suggested he should study art history at the Courtauld Institute of Art. His degree at the Courtauld suited what he called his butterfly mind: "I was painting, learning photography, and developing what is still a major interest: why the world in general, and buildings in particular, don’t look as they do in pictures and photographs".

His first essay, on Francesco Borromini - written for the then Courtauld Director, Anthony Blunt - was described as "dreadful, if enthusiastic".

He graduated with a BA in 1952, then, as a conscientious objector, his two years of National Service were carried out as a hospital porter. This gave him the opportunity to continue his studies part-time. Returning to the Courtauld Institute of Art in 1954 he was employed as a library assistant.

He studied for his PhD on Nicholas Hawksmoor, under the supervision of Margaret Whinney. His PhD was awarded in 1960.

== Hawksmoor and Vanbrugh ==
Downes's reputation was built on his scholarship of two architects. His monograph on Nicholas Hawksmoor (Zwemmer 1959) was his PhD thesis, without the catalogue of drawings. At the time Hawksmoor was a little known pupil of Sir Christopher Wren, and his Christ Church, Spitalfields had been left to rot. Publication of the book helped to rescue the church from destruction by initiating a restoration programme for the church, with parish worship returning in 1987. The importance of this first book, Hawksmoor, was recognised by the award of the Society of Architectural Historians (GB) Alice Davis Hitchcock medallion in 1961.

His second book, Hawksmoor, (Thames & Hudson 1969) explored Hawksmoor's divergence from Wren, and the influence of imagination, with reference to the hall of All Souls College, Oxford.

Downes also wrote two books on Sir John Vanbrugh. The first, Vanbrugh (Zwemmer 1977) examined how Vanbrugh was influenced by Hawksmoor and detailed their collaboration in the building of Castle Howard. The second book, Sir John Vanbrugh: A Biography (Sidgewick & Jackson 1987) painted a broader picture, incorporating Vanbrugh's career as a dramatist.

== Life and career ==
Downes left his job as a librarian at the Courtauld in 1958. He took up a similar position at the Barber Institute of Fine Arts, University of Birmingham until 1966. He then joined the recently appointed Peter Fitzgerald at the University of Reading, initially as a lecturer in Fine Art, then as a Reader (1971 - 1978) and finally Professor, History of Art, retiring Emeritus in 1991. Downes was elected a Fellow of the Society of Antiquaries in 1961. In addition to his career at Reading, Downes was a commissioner with the Royal Commission on the Historical Monuments of England (1981–93); Visiting Lecturer Yale University 1968; Honorary Visiting Professor University of York from 1994; President (1984–88) and Honorary Patron (2017) of the Society of Architectural Historians of Great Britain (1984–88). In 1994 he was appointed OBE. In 1995 he was admitted as Honorary DLitt University of Birmingham.

His interests included the work of Sir Christopher Wren (1632–1723); the Flemish painter Sir Peter Paul Rubens (1577–1640) and Francesco Borromini (1599 - 1667). His fellow historian James Stevens Curl has written, "Downes's productivity seems to contradict his claim that procrastination is one of his recreations". In 1993, a collection of 24 original essays by colleagues, pupils and friends was dedicated to him, entitled English Architecture Public and Private: Essays for Kerry Downes.

Downes married Margaret Walton, a music librarian with a contralto voice in 1962; they remained a devoted couple until her death in 2003.

Photographs by Kerry Downes are held at the Conway Library in the Courtauld, London, and are being digitised.

== Death ==
Downes died in York on 11 August 2019, aged 88.

== Publications ==
- Hawksmoor, 1959, London: A. Zwemmer Ltd
- Hawksmoor, 1970, Thames and Hudson ISBN 978-0500181034.
- Vanbrugh, 1977, London: A. Zwemmer Ltd ASIN B004H74CP6.
- Georgian Cities of Britain, 1979, Phaidon Press ISBN 978-0714819488.
- Sir Christopher Wren, 1982, Trefoil Publications Ltd ISBN 978-0862940300.
- The Architecture of Wren, 1982, Universe Publishing ISBN 978-0876633953.
- Sir John Vanbrugh: A Biography, 1987, Sidgwick & Jackson ISBN 978-0283994975.
- Sir Christopher Wren: The Design of St. Paul's Cathedral, 1989, Aia Press ISBN 978-0913962909.
- Rubens, 2006, Chaucer Press ISBN 978-1904449201.
- Christopher Wren, 2007, Oxford University Press ISBN 978-0199534517.
- Borromini's Book: The “Full Relation of the Building” of the Roman Oratory by Francesco Borromini and Virgilio Spada of the Oratory. Translated by Kerry Downes Wetherby: Oblong Creative, 2009.ISBN 9780955657641.
