= Twelve Tree Copse Cemetery =

WWI CWGC cemetery in Gallipoli

Twelve Tree Copse
- Commonwealth War Graves Commission
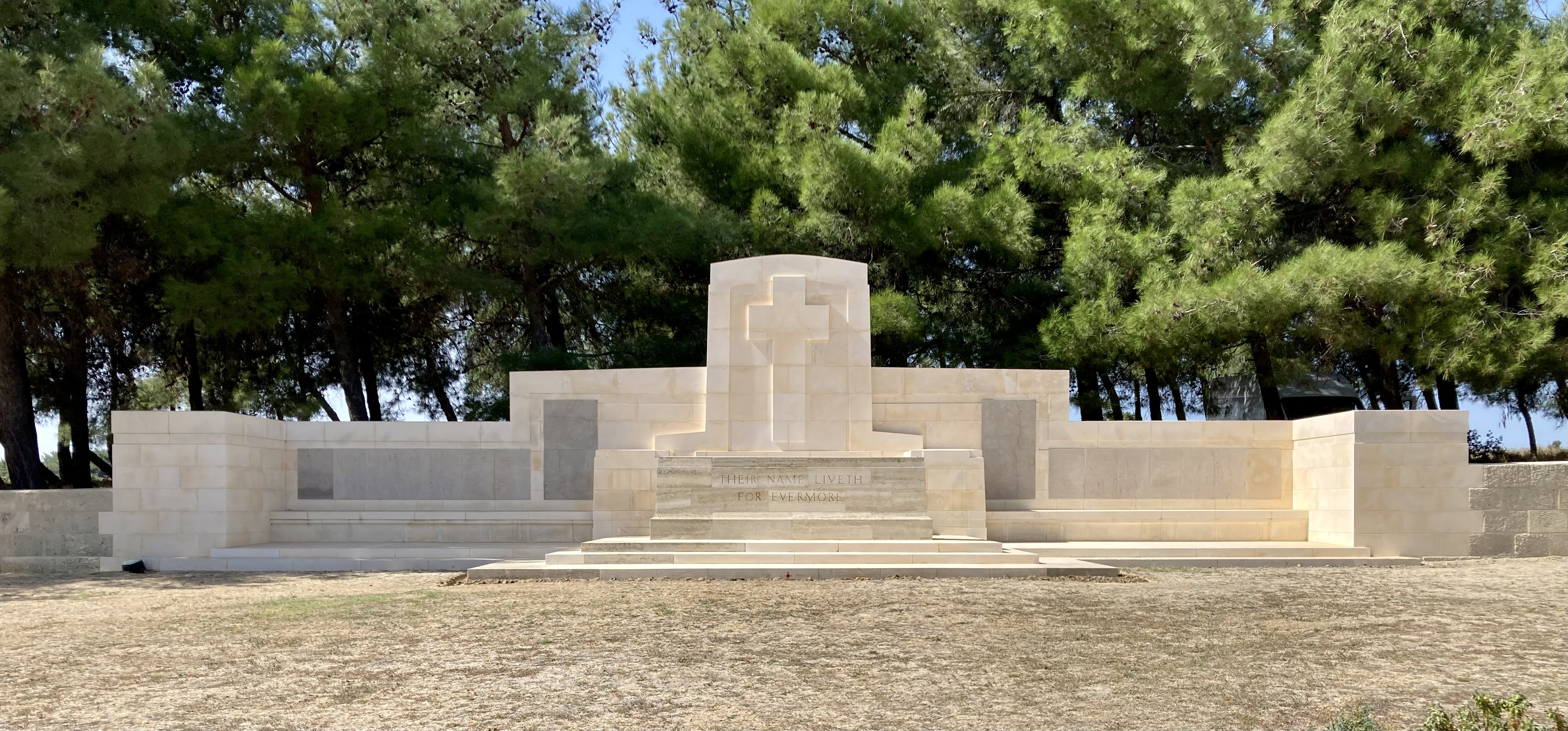
- Used for those deceased April–December 1915
- Established: 1920
- Location: 40°5′16″N 26°12′53″E near Gallipoli, Turkey
- Total burials: 3360
- Unknowns: 2226

Burials by nation
- Allied Powers: British: 1313; New Zealand: 80; Australian: 12; Ceylon: 1; India: 1

Burials by war
- World War I: 3360

Twelve Tree Copse Cemetery is a Commonwealth War Graves Commission cemetery containing the remains of Allied troops who died during the Gallipoli campaign. It is located about one kilometre (0.62 mi) south-west of Krithia on the Gallipoli Peninsula.

It also contains the Twelve Tree Copse (New Zealand) Memorial, one of four memorials on the peninsula which commemorate New Zealand soldiers killed at Gallipoli but whose graves are not known. The 179 names on it record the names of soldiers killed outside of the ANZAC area.

The cemetery was constructed after the Armistice from graves brought in from isolated sites and small cemeteries dotted around the battlefield. Notable amongst these were Geoghan's Bluff Cemetery which contained 925 graves from the Battle of Gully Ravine which was fought in June–July 1915, Fir Tree Wood Cemetery and Clunes Vennel Cemetery which contained 522 graves.

Special memorials contain the names of 646 British soldiers, ten from New Zealanders and one from Australian buried in the cemetery but whose graves have not been identified.

== Notable graves ==
One of the unidentified bodies is that of Second Lieutenant Alfred Smith who was killed when he flung himself onto a grenade to save his comrades, for which he was posthumously awarded a Victoria Cross.
