= Douglas Lawrence =

Australian musician

Raymond Douglas Lawrence AM (born 1943) is an Australian organist who is director of music at the Scots' Church, Melbourne, and teacher of the organ at the University of Melbourne.

In 1969, Lawrence completed his master's degree in music at the University of Melbourne. He then studied from 1969 to 1971 at the Academy of Fine Arts Vienna (Vienna Musikhochschule) under the tutelage of Austrian organist Anton Heiller.

Lawrence founded and directs the Australian Baroque Ensemble and the Australian Chamber Choir. He also founded the Choir of Ormond College. In 1992 he was awarded the Medal of the Order of Australia for services to music. In the 2020 Australia Day Honours, Lawrence was appointed a Member of the Order of Australia for "significant service to the performing arts, particularly to chamber choirs".

He frequently performs as a soloist for major music organisations within Australia and his concert career has taken him throughout most of the world. Amongst several inaugurals, Lawrence played the first concert (1979) on the organ of the Sydney Opera House and Melba Hall at the University of Melbourne and gave the first solo recital on the organ in the Melbourne Concert Hall.

Lawrence has released a number of recordings including The Best of Pachelbel, Buxtehude, A Baroque Collection, Reverberations 1 and Reverberations 2.
