= Kimberly Marshall =

American organist and academic

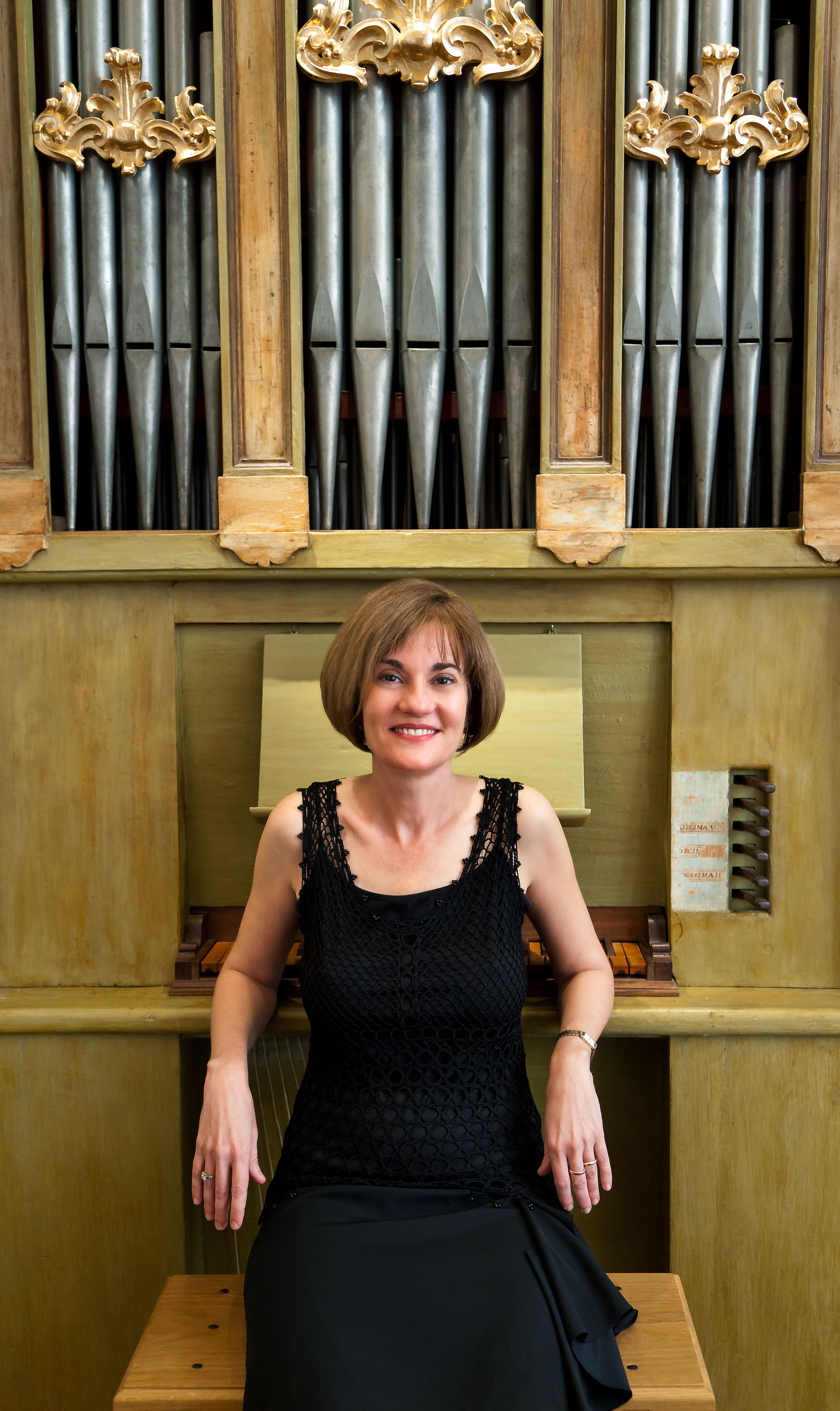
Marshall at the Traeri organ, Arizona State University

Kimberly Marshall (born 1959) is an American organist and academic whose research centers on the history of the organ and its repertoire. She holds the Patricia and Leonard Goldman Endowed Professorship in Organ at Arizona State University (ASU), where she led the School of Music from 2006 to 2012. She won the interpretation prize at the St Albans International Organ Competition in 1985 and received the Medal of the Royal College of Organists in 2022.

== Early life and education ==
Marshall was born in Winston-Salem, North Carolina, and began studying the organ in 1974 with John Mueller at the North Carolina School of the Arts, now the University of North Carolina School of the Arts. From 1977 to 1982 she attended the University of North Carolina at Chapel Hill on a Morehead Scholarship and earned a BA in French, with music tutorials at Duke University and private organ study with Fenner Douglass. She also studied in France with Louis Robilliard at the conservatoire in Lyon (1978–79) and with Xavier Darasse in Toulouse (1980–81), and received a médaille d'or in Lyon.

In 1982 Marshall began graduate study at University College, Oxford, supported by a Marshall Scholarship from the British government. She studied with John Caldwell and with Christopher Page, who supervised her DPhil thesis on iconographical evidence for the late-medieval organ. She received the degree in 1986.

== Career ==
=== Stanford and the Royal Academy of Music ===
Marshall was appointed assistant professor of music and university organist at Stanford University in 1986 and held the post until 1993. She coordinated the DMA program in organ and founded the Organ Consortium at Stanford. In 1991 she received a Fulbright award for a year of research and teaching at the Sydney Conservatorium of Music.

From 1993 to 1996 she was dean of postgraduate studies at the Royal Academy of Music in London, where she developed a master's degree in advanced performance studies, awarded in conjunction with King's College London.

=== Göteborg and Arizona State University ===
From 1996 to 2000 Marshall was a project leader at the Göteborg Organ Research Center (GOArt) at the University of Gothenburg in Sweden. She organized a conference on sound recordings of the organ, held at Arizona State University in January 2002, and later edited its proceedings, which GOArt published in 2012.

Marshall joined ASU in 1998 as associate professor of music to oversee the organ studio. She was associate director for graduate studies in the School of Music from 2001 to 2006 and was promoted to full professor in May 2002, when she received the Goldman Endowed Professorship. She was interim director of the School of Music from August 2006 and director from July 2007 to June 2012. In 2006 she arranged the loan of a Baroque organ built by Traeri to complement the school's organ by Paul Fritts. She is also an advisor on organs to the Musical Instrument Museum in Phoenix.

On March 12, 2022, the Royal College of Organists presented Marshall with its Medal at a ceremony in Southwark Cathedral. The College describes the medal as its highest honour, and it was awarded to her for distinguished achievement in organ performance and scholarship.

== Performance and recordings ==
Marshall won first prize at the St Albans Organ Interpretation Competition in 1985, which led to a contract with the BBC and a recital in the Royal Festival Hall series in London. She has performed organ works by György Ligeti in the composer's presence, at Stanford and at the Royal Academy of Music, and has advocated for music by contemporary composers including Margaret Sandresky, Dan Locklair and Ofer Ben-Amots.

Her recordings on the Loft Recordings label include Divine Euterpe (2000), a collection of organ music by women composers including Fanny Mendelssohn, Elfrida Andrée and Ethel Smyth; Gothic Pipes: The Earliest Organ Music (2004); A Fantasy Through Time (2009), a CD and DVD set of organ fantasias from five centuries; The First Printed Organ Music: Arnolt Schlick (2012); and Celebrating Notre Dame (2021), recorded on the organ of Örgryte New Church in Gothenburg. She was the organist on a 2003 recording for BIS of an organ concerto by Chen Yi with the Singapore Symphony Orchestra.

== Organ sound meditation and John Cage ==
Marshall worked on organ music for meditation and health during the COVID-19 pandemic, developing a guided listening format called Organ Sound Meditation. She presented an "organ sound bath" at the International Orgelpark Symposium in Amsterdam in June 2022. In September she gave a seminar on organ music as sound meditation and led a one-hour session, Organ Sound for Healing, at the Church of Sweden's Kyrkomusiksymposium in Uppsala. In October 2023 she was among the performers in the opening gala concert of the Göteborg International Organ Festival, Echoes of Past and Present in Sound, Light, and Dance.

From January 7 to 15, 2026, Marshall hosted a continuous performance of John Cage's Organ²/ASLSP in the Organ Hall at Arizona State University. Marshall and three colleagues, Christopher Anderson, Diane Luchese and Alexander Meszler, each played a six-hour shift every day, for 192 hours in all, on the hall's two organs, one built by Paul Fritts in 1991 and the other by Domenico Traeri in 1742. The performance ran from noon on the first day to noon on the last and was livestreamed. Each of the work's eight sections lasted 24 hours. Luchese suggested the project to Marshall.

== Research and publications ==
Marshall's research interests include medieval, Renaissance and Baroque keyboard music, the history of the organ, and yoga and mindfulness practice for organists. Her doctoral thesis on the late-medieval organ was published by Garland in 1989. She edited Rediscovering the Muses (1993), a collection of essays on women's musical traditions, and two anthologies of late-medieval and Renaissance organ music for Wayne Leupold Editions, published in 2000 and 2004. She has contributed articles to the Grove Dictionary of Music and the Oxford Dictionary of the Middle Ages.

== Selected publications ==
=== Books and editions ===
- Marshall, Kimberly (1989). Iconographical Evidence for the Late-Medieval Organ in French, Flemish, and English Manuscripts. New York: Garland. ISBN 978-0-8240-2047-7.
- Marshall, Kimberly, ed. (1993). Rediscovering the Muses: Women's Musical Traditions. Boston: Northeastern University Press. ISBN 978-1-55553-173-7. OCLC 28634707.
- Marshall, Kimberly, ed. (2000). Late-Medieval Organ Music before 1460. Historical Organ Techniques and Repertoire. Vol. 3. Colfax, NC: Wayne Leupold Editions.
- Marshall, Kimberly, ed. (2004). Renaissance Organ Music 1500–1550. Historical Organ Techniques and Repertoire. Vol. 9. Colfax, NC: Wayne Leupold Editions.
- Marshall, Kimberly, ed. (2012). The Organ in Recorded Sound: An Exploration of Timbre and Tempo. Göteborg: Göteborg Organ Art Center.

=== Articles ===
- Marshall, Kimberly (November 2008). "Bach on the Organ". Early Music. 36 (4): 661–664.
- Marshall, Kimberly (August 2011). "Bach's 325th Birthday". Early Music. 39 (3): 451–454. doi:10.1093/em/car062.
- Marshall, Kimberly (February 2013). "The "Organ of the Future" in Sweden's Studio Acusticum". The American Organist: 62–65.
- Marshall, Kimberly (2017). "Variable Plena in the 'Bach' Organs of Thuringia and Saxony". Keyboard Perspectives. X: 91–111.
- Marshall, Kimberly (2018). "From Modules to Music: Recreating Late-Medieval Organs in the Last Quarter Century". Journal of the British Institute of Organ Studies. 42: 79–98.
- Marshall, Kimberly (June 2022). "Playing the Stylus phantasticus". Organists' Review: 10–18.
- Marshall, Kimberly (January 2023). "The Earliest Organists: Women Playing the Hydraulis, ca. 250 BCE–250 CE". The American Organist. 57 (1): 54–57.
- Marshall, Kimberly (August 2026). "'Passing the Time' with John Cage". The Diapason. Vol. 117, no. 8.

=== Chapters ===
- Marshall, Kimberly (2012). "György Ligeti (1923–2006)". In Anderson, Christopher S. (ed.). Twentieth-Century Organ Music. Routledge Studies in Musical Genres. New York: Routledge. pp. 262–285. ISBN 978-0-415-87565-3.
- Marshall, Kimberly (2012). "Cycles of Interpretation in Recordings of Bach's Organ Music". In Marshall, Kimberly (ed.). The Organ in Recorded Sound: An Exploration of Timbre and Tempo. Göteborg: Göteborg Organ Art Center. pp. 45–51.
- Marshall, Kimberly (2017). "Is This Still Medieval? Contextualizing the Van Straten Organ". In Fidom, Hans (ed.). Medieval Organ Art: The Van Straten Organ at the Orgelpark. Orgelpark Research Reports. Vol. 4. Amsterdam: VU University Press. pp. 17–34. ISBN 978-90-8659-222-7.

== Selected discography ==
- Divine Euterpe: 15th–20th Century Organ Music by Women Composers. Loft Recordings, LRCD 1021, 2000.
- Bach Encounters Buxtehude. Loft Recordings, LRCD 1029, 2002.
- Chen Yi, organ concerto, with the Singapore Symphony Orchestra. BIS, 2003.
- Gothic Pipes: The Earliest Organ Music. Loft Recordings, LRCD 1047, 2004.
- A Fantasy Through Time: Five Centuries of Organ Fantasies. Loft Recordings, LRCD 1108, 2009.
- The First Printed Organ Music: Arnolt Schlick. Loft Recordings, LRCD 1124, 2012.
- A Recital in Handel's Parish Church. Loft Recordings, LRCD 1154, 2015.
- Celebrating Notre Dame, with Schola Gothia. Loft Recordings, LRCD-1168-DA, 2021.
