= Anton Heiller =

Austrian musician

Anton Heiller (15 September 1923 – 25 March 1979) was an Austrian organist, harpsichordist, composer and conductor.

== Biography ==
Born in Vienna, he was first trained in church music by Wilhelm Mück, organist of Vienna's Stephansdom (St. Stephen's Cathedral). He then combined work as répétiteur and choirmaster at the Vienna Volksoper with further study at the Vienna Academy of Music under Bruno Seidlhofer (piano, organ, harpsichord) and Friedrich Reidinger (music theory and composition) while serving in the military, mostly as a medical aide. In 1945, he both graduated from the academy and was appointed organ teacher there. He was promoted to professor in 1957.

Heiller's career after World War II is an uninterrupted list of concerts, lectures, records, jury service at contests, and professional honors. In 1952 he won the International Organ Competition in Haarlem, Netherlands, and toured both Europe and the United States, where his organ recitals at Harvard University (on the then new C.B. Fisk instrument in Memorial Church) — still available on a 4-CD boxed set — were particularly appreciated. A few years before this, he had released a set of recordings for Vanguard of many of Bach's larger organ works on a majestic Marcussen instrument in Sweden. His two Haydn Society LPs, from the early 1950s, of Joseph Haydn's Symphonies 26 ("Lamentation") and 36 and Symphonies 52 and 56, are distinguished for their forthright conciseness and straightforwardness, without gratuitous ritardandi or other tempo changes not requested by Haydn in the score.

Successive Austrian governments bestowed on Heiller every artistic award in their power, including the Vienna Culture Prize (1963), the Vienna Cross of Honor for Arts and Science (1968) and the Grand Austrian State Prize (1969). Offered the conductorship of the Vienna State Opera he declined in order to concentrate on keyboard playing, although near the end of his life he said he was looking forward to conducting more.

Heiller recorded most of his large repertory, which ranged from Giovanni Gabrieli and Dieterich Buxtehude through Bach to Max Reger and Heiller's good friend Paul Hindemith. Romantic works interested him much less than Baroque and 20th-century material. In whatever works he performed he displayed formidable technique, immense rhythmic strength and, in particular, a rare talent for clarifying and maintaining the momentum of the most complex polyphonic passages with what sounded like effortless ease.

He also composed from his teens onward. His works, influenced by Hindemith and Frank Martin, were often dodecaphonic, and never achieved anything like the acclaim of his performances, but he was prolific and composed much music for his own instrument, including an organ concerto (1963) and what may be the only concerto ever written for organ and harpsichord (1972).

He died unexpectedly and prematurely in Vienna at the age of 55, collapsing after choking on food, from what was thought to be a heart attack.

His notable pupils include Monique Gendron, Wolfgang Karius, Jan Kleinbussink, Douglas Lawrence, Brett Leighton, Peter Planyavsky, Michael Radulescu, David Rumsey, David Sanger, Sibyl Urbancic, Jean-Claude Zehnder, and Miriam Clapp Duncan .

== Works ==
- 1937 – Drei frühe Choralvorspiele – für Orgel
- 1938 – Die Bäume blühn und duften – für gemischten Chor a cappella
- 1938 – Christus factus est – für gemischten Chor a cappella
- 1940 – Sonatensatz in D für Orgel
- 1940 – Passacaglia in C für Orgel
- 1941 – Zwischenspiel E-Dur für Orgel
- 1941 – Toccata für Klavier
- 1941 – Fantasie und Fuge in F für Orgel
- 1942 – Drei Lieder nach Gedichten von Anton Wildgans – für Mezzosopran und Klavier
- 1943 – Klavierstück
- 1943 – O du fröhliche – Choralvorspiel und Choral für Orgel
- 1943 – Toccata Zwei Klaviere zu vier Händen
- 1943 – Intermezzo – für Klavier
- 1944 – Ave Maria – für Sopran, Violine und Viola
- 1944 – Es ist ein Ros' entsprungen (Kleine Partita für Orgel)
- 1944 – Messe in mixolydisch g – für gemischten Chor a cappella
- 1944 – Sonate für Orgel
- 1945 – Wen Gott liebt – Spruch für Gesang und Klavier
- 1945 – Das Marienkind – Musik zum gleichnamigen Legendenspiel
- 1945 – Lux fulgebit nos – für vier Knabenstimmen
- 1945 – Der Heiland ist erstanden – Choralmotette für gemischten Chor a cappella
- 1946 – Kammersinfonie
- 1946 – Requiem – für dreistimmigen gemischten Chor a cappella
- 1946 – Laetentur caeli – für vierstimmigen Knabenchor
- 1946 – Christus factus est – für dreistimmigen Knabenchor
- 1947 – Ave Maria – für Sopran und Klavier oder Orgel
- 1947 – Resurrexi – für vierstimmigen gemischten Chor a cappella
- 1947 – Unam petii a domino – für Knabenchor a cappella
- 1947 – Exsurge, Domine – für Männerchor a cappella
- 1947 – Zweite Sonate für Orgel
- 1947 – Zwei kleine Partiten:
  - I) "Freu dich sehr, o meine Seele"
  - II) "Vater unser im Himmelreich"
- 1948 – Messe in lydisch f – für vierstimmigen gemischten Chor und Orgel
- 1948 – Missa in nocte – für zweistimmigen Oberchor und Orgel
- 1949 – Präludium und Fuge A-Dur – für Orgel
- 1949 – Dreifaltigkeitsproprium – für gemischten Chor a cappella
- 1949 – Ach wie nichtig, ach wie flüchtig – Choralmotette für gemischten Chor a cappella
- 1950 – Tragische Geschichte – für gemischten Chor a cappella
- 1951 – Nörgeln – für gemischten Chor a cappella
- 1951 – Hoc corpus – für gemischten Chor a cappella
- 1951 – O Jesu, all mein Leben – für gemischten Chor a cappella
- 1951 – Missa brevis in C – für gemischten Chor a cappella
- 1951 – Grad dort – für gemischten Chor a cappella
- 1951–1953 – Drei kleine geistliche Chöre – für gemischten Chor a cappella
- 1952 – Tentatio Jesu – Kurzoratorium für Soli, gemischten Chor und zwei Klaviere
- 1953 – Ich liebe dich von Herzensgrund – für Oberchor a cappella
- 1953 – Missa super "Erhalt uns, Herr, bei deinem Wort" – für Frauen- oder Knabenchor a cappella
- 1953 – Te Deum für gemischten Chor und Orgel
- 1955 – So treiben wir den Winter aus – für gemischten Chor a cappella
- 1955 – Psalmenkantate – für Soli, gemischten Chor, Orgel und Orchester
- 1956 – Deutsches Proprium für den Dreifaltigkeitssonntag – für gemischten Chor a cappella
- 1956 – François Villon – Rundfunkballade (Oratorium) für Soli, Chor und Orchester
- 1956 – Memorare – für gemischten Chor a cappella
- 1957 – Ave Maria – für dreistimmigen Oberchor
- 1957 – Missa super "Salve regina" et "Vater unser im Himmelreich" – für dreistimmigen Oberchor
- 1957 – Vier österreichische Volksliedsätze – für Männerchor a cappella
- 1957 – Confirma hoc, Deus – für gemischten Chor a cappella
- 1958 – Regina martyrum – Kantate für Soli, vierstimmigen Chor und Orgel
- 1958 – Postludium super "Ite, missa est XI" (für Orgel)
- 1958 – Vier geistliche Motetten – (Proprium in Anniversario Dedicationis ecclesiae) für gemischten Chor a cappella
  - I) Terribilis est
  - II) Locus iste
  - III) Domine deus
  - IV) Domus mea
- 1959 – Domine Deus omnipotens – Hymnus für Sopran und Klavier
- 1959 – In festo corporis Christi (Vier Stücke zum Fronleichnamsfest)
- 1959 – Zwei geistliche Gesänge – für Sopran und Orgel
- 1960 – Lobet, ihr Knechte des Herrn – Kleine Motette für gemischten Chor a cappella
- 1960 – Tantum ergo I über ein Zwölftonmodell – für gemischten Chor a cappella
- 1960 – Tantum ergo II über die gregorianische Melodie – für gemischten Chor a cappella
- 1960 – Missa super modos duodecimales – für gemischten Chor und sieben Instrumente
- 1960 – O Rex gentium – für gemischten Chor a cappella
- 1961 – Klavierstück über den Namen "Alfred Schlee"
- 1961 – Stufen – für Oberchor a cappella
- 1961 – Pater noster, Ave Maria – für Alt und Klavier
- 1961 – Kleine Messe über Zwölftonmodelle – für gemischten Chor a cappella
- 1962 – Fiat voluntas tua – für Alt und Klavier
- 1963 – Der 37. Psalm – für Chor und Orchester
- 1963 – Konzert für Orgel und Orchester
- 1964 – Terribilis est – für gemischten Chor a cappella
- 1964 – Sub tuum praesidium – für Alt und Klavier
- 1964 – Proprium zum Fronleichnamsfest – für dreistimmigen gemischten Chor a cappella
- 1965 – Deutsches Ordinarium – für gemischten Chor und Orgel oder Orchester
- 1965 – English Mass – for mixed choir, congregation and organ
- 1965 – Fantasia super "Salve Regina" (für Orgel)
- 1965 – In principio erat verbum – Kantate für Tenor, gemischten Chor, Orchester und Orgel
- 1965 – Nun bitten wir den heiligen Geist – Kleines Choralvorspiel für Orgel
- 1966 – Deutsches Proprium für den vierten Sonntag nach Ostern – für Knaben- oder Frauenchor
- 1967 – Deutsches Proprium zum Dreifaltigkeitsfest – für Chor, Gemeinde und Orgel
- 1967 – Ecce lignum crucis – Meditation für Orgel
- 1968 – Das Laub fällt von den Bäumen – für gemischten Chor a cappella
- 1968 – Improvisation über den Gregorianischen Choral "Ave maris stella"
- 1968 – Stabat Mater für gemischten Chor und Orchester
- 1970 – Geistliches Konzert – für gemischten Chor und sechs Holzbläser
- 1970 – 100 Jahre Wiener Musikverein – Geburtstagsgabe in einer Reihe von 100 Tönen
- 1970 – Tanz-Toccata für Orgel
- 1971 – Adventmusik – für Oboe, Violine, Kinderchor und Orgel
- 1971–1972 – Konzert für Cembalo, Orgelpositiv & Kamerorchester
- 1972 – Nun komm' der Heiden Heiland (Variationen für Orgel)
- 1973 – Solo – für Gitarre
- 1973 – Passionsmusik – für Kinderchor und Orgel
- 1974 – Drei Weihnachtslieder – für Oberchor a cappella
- 1974 – Meditation für Orgel über die Gregorianische Oster-Sequenz ("Victimae Paschali Laudes")
- 1974 – Nicht Knechte, sondern meine Freunde nenne ich euch – für gemischten Chor a cappella
- 1974 – Verleih uns Frieden gnädiglich – Choralvorspiel für Orgel
- 1975 – Drei kleine Choralvorspiele für Orgel:
  - I) "Valet will ich dir geben"
  - II) "Der Tag ist hin"
  - III) "Mit Fried und Freud ich fahr dahin"
- 1975 – Aus tiefer Not schrei ich zu dir – Intonation, Choral und drei Variationen für Orgel
- 1975 – Ein wenig über B-A-C-H – Drei kleine Stücke für Cembalo
- 1975 – Kleine deutsche Messe – für Oberchor und Orgel
- 1976 – Jubilato (für Orgel)
- 1977 – Hymnus für Chor und Orgel aus der Vesper für Kantor, Soli, Chor und Orgel
- 1977 – Hochgebet mit eigenem Sanctus – für Singstimme allein
- 1977 – Magnificat aus der Vesper für Kantor, Soli, Chor und Orgel
- 1977 – Es ist ein Ros' entsprungen (Orgelsatz)
- 1977 – Kleine Partita über das dänische Lied: "Den klare sol går ned" (für Orgel, mit Anhang für Flöte solo)
- 1977 – Vorspiel, Zwischenspiel und Nachspiel aus der "Vesper" für Kantor, Chor und Orgel
- 1977–1978 – Choralvorspiele zu Liedern des Dänischen Gasangbuchs:
  - I) O Hoved, højt forhånet (O Haupt voll Blut und Wunden')
  - II) Det hellige kors
  - III) Rind nu op i Jesu navn (Steh nun auf in Jesu Namen)
  - IV) Min sjael, den Herren love (Nun lob mein Seel den Herren)
  - V) Sorrig og glæde de vandre til hobe (Kummer und Freude, zusammen sie wandern)
  - VI) Som lilliens hjerte kan holdes i grøde (Wie der Lilie Herze kann reifen zur Ernte)
  - VII) Freu dich sehr, meine Seele
- 1978 – Kleine Partita "Erhalt uns, Herr, bei deinem Wort"
