= Gillian Weir =

New Zealand-British organist

Dame Gillian Weir DBE FRCM
- Born: Gillian Constance Weir; 17 January 1941 (age 85); Martinborough, New Zealand
- Education: Whanganui Girls' College
- Alma mater: Royal College of Music, London
- Occupation: Organist (retired)
- Organisation: Patron of the New Zealand Organ Association
- Spouses: Clive Webster (m. 1967; div. 1972) Lawrence Phelps (m. 1972)
- Parents: Cecil Alexander Weir; Clarice Mildred Foy
- Awards: St Albans International Organ Festival (1964)

Dame Gillian Constance Weir DBE FRCM (born 17 January 1941) is a New Zealand-British organist.

== Biography ==
Weir was born in Martinborough, New Zealand, on 17 January 1941. Her parents were Clarice Mildred Foy (née Bignell) and Cecil Alexander Weir. She received her schooling at Queen's Park School, Wanganui Intermediate, and Wanganui Girls' College. When she was 19, she was a co-winner of the Auckland Star Piano Competition, playing Mozart. A year later she won a scholarship of the Associated Board of the Royal Schools of Music in London. There, she studied with the concert pianist Cyril Smith and the renowned organist Ralph Downes, and in her second year (1964) won the prestigious St. Albans International Organ Competition.

Weir made her début at the Royal Albert Hall while still a student, as soloist in the Poulenc Organ Concerto, on the opening night of the 1965 season of the Promenade Concerts, and in the same year at the Royal Festival Hall in recital, then the youngest organist to have performed there publicly. She returned to the Albert Hall to make the first recording on the great organ after the 2004 rebuild.

In 1967, she married Clive Rowland Webster. The marriage was dissolved in 1972. In that year, she married Lawrence Irving Phelps, an American organ builder.

== Messiaen ==
Her performance in 1964 of a work by Olivier Messiaen occurred at a time when his music was little-known outside France and she became particularly associated with this composer; she has several times performed his complete works in series. Her recording for Collins Classics (re-released for Priory Records on 2002) was hailed as "one of the major recording triumphs of the century" in In Tune Magazine. Her distinguished position as a Messiaen interpreter has been reinforced by her CD release of his complete organ works to great acclaim as well as by her contribution to Faber's The Messiaen Companion and other publications. At Messiaen's request, she gave the first UK performance in January 1973 of the Méditations sur le Mystère de la Sainte Trinité at the Royal Festival Hall from a facsimile of the composer's manuscript, given to her after he gave the world premiere in Washington D.C.

Her series of six weekly recitals in Westminster Cathedral of Messiaen's organ works in 1998, the 90th anniversary of his birth, brought huge audiences, and for her performances she was awarded the Evening Standard Award for Outstanding Solo Performance, the first organist to have been so honoured.

== Recordings ==
Weir's artistry was marked in 1999 by the re-issue on CD of her series of Argo recordings, and her nomination by Classic CD magazine as one of the 100 Greatest Players of the Century, and by The Sunday Times as one of the 1000 Music Makers of the Millennium. In December 2000, ITV's South Bank Show chronicled her worldwide activities as performer, teacher and recording artist.

== Television ==
Weir performed in her own six-part television series King of Instruments for the BBC in 1989; it drew large audiences in Great Britain.

== Honours and awards ==
- 1975: Elected Honorary Fellow of the Royal College of Organists, London (Hon. FRCO)
- 1977: First woman elected to the Council of the Royal College of Organists
- 1981: International Performer of the Year, elected by the American Guild of Organists, New York City
- 1981–83: First woman President of the Incorporated Association of Organists
- 1982: Elected Musician of the Year by the International Music Guide
- 1982: Elected Honorary Member of the International Music Sorority Sigma Alpha Iota
- 1983: Elected Honorary Fellow of the Royal Canadian College of Organists (Hon FRCCO)
- 1983: Awarded honorary Doctor of Music from the University of Victoria, Wellington, New Zealand (Hon D.Mus.)
- 1985: First musician to receive the Turnovsky Foundation Award for Outstanding Contribution to the Arts
- 1989: Appointed Commander of the Order of the British Empire (CBE) in the 1989 Queen's Birthday Honours, for services to music
- 1989: Elected Honorary Member of the Royal Academy of Music, London (Hon. RAM)
- 1992–93: President of the Incorporated Society of Musicians, England
- 1993: Trustee of the Eric Thompson Charitable Trust for Organists and Organ Music
- 1994–96: First woman president of the Royal College of Organists, England
- 1996: Promoted Dame Commander of the Order of the British Empire (DBE) in the 1996 New Year Honours, for services to music
- 1997–98: Visiting professor of the Royal Academy of Music, London
- 1997: Awarded honorary doctorate by the University of Huddersfield (Hon D.Litt.)
- 1998: Awarded Silver Medal by the Albert Schweitzer Association (Sweden)
- 1998–present: President of the Soloist's Ensemble
- 1998: Patron of the Oundle International Festival
- 1999: Appointed the Prince Consort Professor in Organ, Royal College of Music, London
- 1999: March 1999 – Winner of the Evening Standard Award for Outstanding Solo Performance in 1998
- 1999: July 1999 – Awarded honorary doctorate by the University of Hull (Hon D.Mus.)
- 1999: Patron of Friends of Young Artists' Platform
- 1999–present: Patron of the Cirencester Early Music Festival
- 2000: November 2000 – Elected Fellow of the Royal College of Music, London (FRCM)
- 2000: December 2000 – Subject of television documentary profile by the South Bank Show (ITV)
- 2001: February 2001 – Awarded honorary doctorate by the University of Exeter (Hon D.Mus.)
- 2001: Awarded honorary doctorate by Birmingham City University (Hon Doctor of the university)
- 2003: Awarded honorary doctorate by the University of Leicester (Hon D.Mus.)
- 2004: Awarded honorary doctorate by the University of Aberdeen (Hon D.Mus.)
- 2006: Elected Member of the Senior Common Room at the University College and St Chad's College, Durham University
- 2009: Elected Member of the Senior Common Room at the College of St Hild and St Bede, Durham University
- 2009: Awarded honorary doctorate by the University of London (Hon D.Mus.)
- 2011: Awarded Arts Foundation of New Zealand Icon Award
