= William Fox (organist) =

English organist (born 1995)

- Born: 1995
- Education: Royal Birmingham Conservatoire
- Occupation: Organist
- Organizations: St Paul's Cathedral; St Albans Cathedral

William Fox (born 1995) is an English organist, currently director of music at St Albans Cathedral.

Fox was successively a chorister at York Minster, junior organ scholar at Wells Cathedral and organ scholar at Hereford Cathedral. While in Hereford he became a Fellow of the Royal College of Organists (FRCO) and won the Turpin and Durrant prize. He then read music at Magdalen College, Oxford, from where he graduated with First-Class Honours, and was organ scholar under the directorship of Daniel Hyde and Mark Williams.

Fox was appointed sub-organist at St Paul's Cathedral in October 2017, and took up the post in July 2018; he is the youngest person to be appointed to this position. In September 2019, he became a Junior Fellow of the Royal Birmingham Conservatoire, where he also studies. He won the 2018 Sir Anthony Lewis Memorial Prize Competition for piano accompaniment, at the Royal Academy of Music.

Fox's playing has been broadcast on BBC Radio 3, Classic FM, and BBC Television; he has recorded on the Opus Arte and Naxos labels.

On 16 February 2024 it was announced that Fox would be the next director of music at St Albans Cathedral from September 2024, following the retirement of Andrew Lucas, who had been master of the music at the cathedral since 1998. He also accepted an invitation by St Albans Bach Choir to become their new musical director, who has traditionally been the director of music at the cathedral.

== Discography ==
- On Christmas Night (Choir of Magdalen College, Oxford)
- The Pillar of the Cloud (Choir of Magdalen College, Oxford)
- Cecilia McDowall: Organ Works
