= Marcussen =

Marcussen is a surname. Notable people with the surname include:

- Hanna Elise Marcussen (born 1977), Norwegian politician
- Ida Marcussen (born 1987), Norwegian heptathlete
- Jan Marcussen, American Seventh-day Adventist and former minister
- Jens Marcussen (1926–2007), Norwegian politician
- Jørgen Marcussen (born 1950), Danish racing cyclist
- Peder Marcussen (1894–1972), Danish gymnast
- Sigurd Marcussen (1905–2006), Norwegian politician
- Stephen Marcussen, chief mastering engineer

== See also ==
- Marcussen & Søn, a Danish organ building company
