= Bruno Mathieu =

French organist

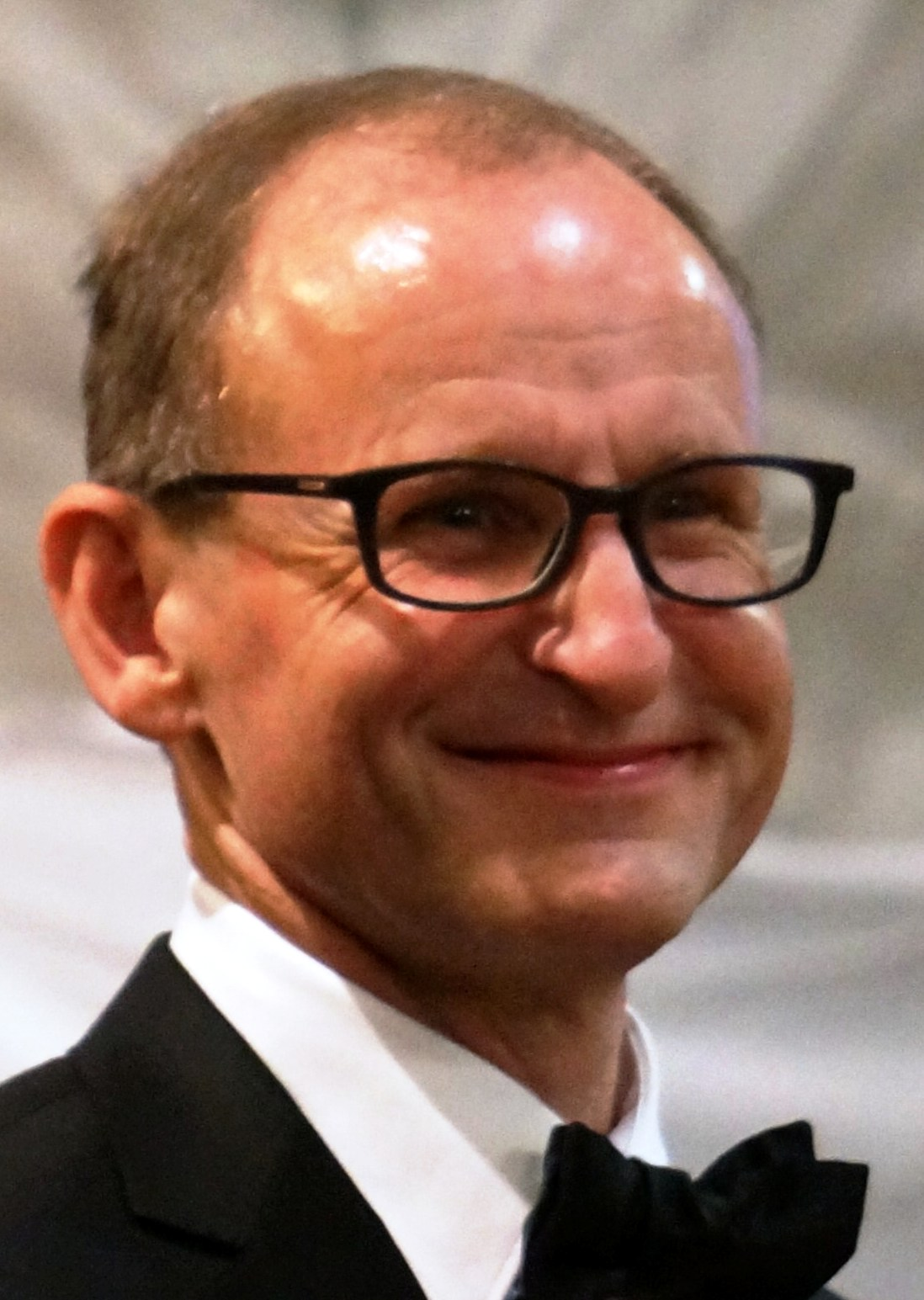
En concert en 2014.

Bruno Mathieu (born 23 March 1958) is a French organist. He studied organ with Jean Langlais, Suzanne Chaisemartin, Jean Guillou, Marie-Claire Alain, and composition with Pierre Lantier, as well as piano with France Clidat and Gisèle Kühn. He is the organist of the Church of Saint-Justin de Levallois-Perret.

To date, he has given over six hundred recitals in Canada and throughout Europe. In Paris, he is particularly active at the great organs of Notre-Dame de Paris and the Saint-Sulpice, Saint-Germain-des-Prés, la Madeleine churches. Mathieu teaches organ at the 20th arrondissement of Paris Conservatory.

Mathieu has recorded under the labels Festivo, Adda, Naxos, and Numérisson. His compositions include a "Te Deum", premiered at Notre-Dame de Paris on 31 December 2000, a "Fantasy for organ", and a small suite for piano.

== Compositions ==
- "Fantaisie pour orgue" (Delatour France)
- "Te Deum pour orgue" (Delatour France)
- "Petite suite sotte" pour piano (Delatour France)
- "Volute Trinitaire pour orgue" (Delatour France
- "Sourires" pour orgue

== Recordings ==
- Louis Vierne: Symphonies pour orgue 3 et 6 (Naxos)
- Jean Langlais: Suite Médiévale (Naxos)
- Marcel Dupré: Symphonies
- Olivier Messiaen : La Nativité / Bruno Mathieu : Te Deum (Delatour France numérisson)
- Johann-Sebastian Bach : 6 Sonates en trio (Delatour France numérisson)
- Louis Vierne 2e Symphonie - Marcel Dupré: 3 préludes et fugues op.7 (Delatour France numérisson)
