= Thomas Trotter (musician) =

British concert organist

- Born: 4 April 1957 (age 69)
- Origin: England
- Occupation: Concert organist

Thomas Andrew Trotter (born 4 April 1957) is an English concert organist. He is Birmingham City Organist, organist of St Margaret's, Westminster, visiting Fellow in Organ Studies in the Royal Northern College of Music and president of St Albans International Organ Festival.

== Biography ==
Born in Birkenhead, he was a pupil at Malvern College and studied music at Cambridge University where he was organ scholar at King's College. He also studied under Marie-Claire Alain, winning the Prix de Virtuosité in her class. He won first prize in the interpretation competition at the St Albans International Organ Festival in 1979 and made his debut in the Royal Festival Hall the following year. He was appointed to the position of Birmingham City Organist in 1983, succeeding Sir George Thalben-Ball.

In Birmingham he plays regularly in the city's Symphony Hall and Town Hall, usually including contemporary compositions in his recitals. He is also noted for playing transcriptions of orchestral music, which is a tradition at St Margaret's, Westminster, where he is organist.

Trotter has performed and been recorded around the world, and is much sought after as a soloist in orchestral partnerships. He has performed with conductors Sir Simon Rattle, Bernard Haitink, Riccardo Chailly and Sir Charles Mackerras, as joint soloist with performers including Evelyn Glennie, and has given recitals in the Berlin Philharmonie, Leipzig Gewandhaus, Musikverein, Vienna and Konzerthaus, Vienna and London's Royal Festival Hall; and has given the commissioning recital on new or restored organs in places such as Cleveland's Severance Hall (Ohio), Princeton University Chapel (New Jersey), the Amsterdam Concertgebouw, St David's Hall, Cardiff, and most recently, the Royal Albert Hall in London, following the extensive refurbishment of its organ by Mander Organs completed in 2005.

Trotter has also been invited to perform on major historic instruments such as those at St. Ouen in Rouen, St. Bavo's in Haarlem (Netherlands), Weingarten Abbey in Germany and Woolsey Hall at Yale University and he appears at the festivals of Salzburg, Berlin, Vienna, Edinburgh and London's BBC Proms.

In 2020, he was awarded The Queen's Medal for Music, awarded annually to an individual or group of musicians who had a major influence on the musical life of the United Kingdom.

== Recording history ==
Trotter's recordings of Messiaen and Mozart have been named "Critics Choice" by The Gramophone magazine, and he received a Grand Prix du Disque for his recording of music by Franz Liszt in 1995. He was consultant for the new Marcussen organ in Manchester's Bridgewater Hall and also for the organ in Birmingham's Symphony Hall.

He has released seven CD recordings on the Regent Records label: the complete organ works of Elgar from Salisbury Cathedral (REGCD256), released for the 150th anniversary of the composer's birth (2007); Restored to Glory (REGCD265), released to commemorate the re-opening of the Town Hall and re-inauguration of its organ in October 2007; Sounds of St Giles (REGCD302), on the new Mander East organ of St Giles Cripplegate in 2008 (Gramophone Critics' Choice); CPE Bach Organ Works (REGCD314) released in December 2009; Schumann: Complete Works for Organ (REGCD347 – Editor's Choice, Gramophone Magazine, January 2011), recorded on the historic Ladegast organ of Merseburg Cathedral, Germany, and Grand Organ Prom (REGCD322 – Editor's Choice, Organists' Review, August 2011), transcriptions and original works from the Victorian concert hall tradition, recorded at the Royal Albert Hall, London; 'From Palaces to Pleasure Gardens' – the 1735 Richard Bridge Organ of Christ Church, Spitalfields, London (REGCD526 – Editor's Choice, Gramophone Magazine, October 2019). All have received outstanding critical response.

He has released two DVDs on Regent: The Town Hall Tradition (REGDVD001 – September 2011, OCLC 1048627643), recorded on the organ of Town Hall, Birmingham, and A Shropshire Idyll (REGDVD002 – March 2014, OCLC 904720508), released to commemorate the 250th anniversary of the Snetzler organ in St Laurence's Church, Ludlow.
