= Jan Marcussen =

American preacher and author

A. Jan Marcussen is a preacher, and marriage counselor. He is most known for views and promotion, through writing and other methods, of eschatology and the seventh-day Sabbath. Marcussen has offered to pay 1,000,000 U.S. dollars to anyone who can find biblical proof of a Sunday Sabbath.

== Books ==
Marcussen’s writings includes books by Amazing Truth Publications: Two Months to Live; Cousin Henry Potter (and the Terrible Time Machine); and National Sunday Law. Seven Secrets of Family Happiness is published by “Southern Publishing Association,” The Seventh-day Adventist denominational publisher, Southern Publishing Association, was located in Nashville, TN, and merged with the denominational Review and Herald Publishing Association in 1980.

Marcussen’s National Sunday Law was published in 1983. By 2021, it has reached 48.1 million copies in 74 languages. National Sunday Laws focuses on prophetic apocalyptic interpretations and warnings from the biblical books of Daniel and Revelation. Among other things, he discusses the Beast in Revelation and the image and mark of The Beast in Revelation. National Sunday Law maintains that the United States government will soon enact a national blue law that would mandate Sunday as being a day of rest and worship.

== Videos ==
- Catholic Charismatic Attack (on God's SDA Church) series
- Roman Catholic Attack (on God's SDA Church) series
- Revelation Studies series

== Newsletter ==
Jan Marcussen publishes a newsletter that chronicles the advancement toward a civil law requiring worship on Sundays (the Lord's Day in historic Christianity).

== Cultural references ==
Marcussen's National Sunday Law was in part the inspiration for the 2004 action movie, The 4th Beast: Mask of the Antichrist. Director Nathyn Masters, an alumnus of Chicago's Columbia College, recounts how he desired to create an endtime Christian action film with a posttribulation scenario as an alternative to such pre-tribulation films as Left Behind.

== See also ==
- Historic Adventism
