= David Sanger (organist) =

- Born: 17 April 1947
- Origin: Britain
- Died: 28 May 2010 (aged 63)

David John Sanger (17 April 1947 – 28 May 2010) was a British concert organist, professor and president of the Royal College of Organists.

== Biography ==
Sanger was educated at Eltham College and the Royal Academy of Music. His teachers included Susi Jeans, Marie-Claire Alain and Anton Heiller.

His career as a performer was launched when he won first prize in two international competitions: St Albans, England in 1969 and Kiel, Germany in 1972. After this, he toured as a solo recitalist. His discography spans the music of several centuries, and includes the complete organ works of Franck, the complete organ symphonies of Louis Vierne, and works by Liszt and Lefébure-Wély. He also recorded the complete organ music of Bach for Meridian Records.

He toured many countries as recitalist – Germany, Denmark, Sweden, Norway, Finland, Belgium, the Netherlands, Austria, Italy, France, Russia, Iceland, the United States, Mexico and South Korea – as well as giving many recitals in the British Isles, notably at the BBC Proms at the Royal Albert Hall, The Royal Festival Hall, the City of London Festival, the Bath Festival, the Chester Festival, the West Riding Cathedrals' Festival, and many similar occasions. He gave Master Classes in many places including Copenhagen, Stockholm and Oslo, and was 'Headmaster' of the Church Music Seminar in Bergen for fourteen years. He was frequently partnered by Hans Fagius from Sweden for Organ Duet Concerts.

=== Recording ===
As a recording artist he made over 20 CDs. His début on the organ was with Polydor (DG Début Series) with Bach and Franck recorded in Munich. He recorded the complete organ works of César Franck at the Katarina Church in Stockholm (before the fire) for BIS. His Meridian recordings of Vierne's Six Organ Symphonies received wide acclaim and he was close to completing his recordings of the complete organ works of Bach. The most recent Bach CDs were recorded on the newly constructed, historic-style, Carsten Lund organ in Copenhagen's Garnisons Church.

With Meridian he recorded a selection of trifles by Lefébure-Wély on the recent Cavaillé-Coll style instrument at Exeter College, Oxford, for which instrument Sanger also acted as Consultant. Other projects as consultant included new, rebuilt or restored organs at Bromley Parish Church, Haileybury School, St Cuthbert's, Edinburgh, Usher Hall, Edinburgh, Leeds Cathedral, Trinity Hall, Cambridge, Strathclyde University and Sheffield Cathedral.

=== Teaching ===
In addition to his performing career, Sanger was a teacher of the organ. He was professor of organ at the Royal Academy of Music in London, and chairman of the organ department there from 1987 to 1989. Between 1989 and 1997 he was a Consultant Professor at the RAM. He was guest professor for two years at the Royal Danish Academy of Music, Copenhagen. He was a Visiting Tutor in organ studies at the Royal Northern College of Music, Birmingham Conservatoire, and teacher of organ at Oxford and Cambridge Universities. He was appointed as Consultant Tutor at the Birmingham Conservatoire. He had many successful students at international competition level, including two winners at the Calgary International Organ Competition.

=== Competition juror ===
Sanger appeared in the jury of many international organ competitions; St Albans, Paisley, Speyer, Biarritz, Alkmaar, Odense Nűrnberg and Lucerne. He was made a Fellow of the Royal Academy of Music in 1985.

=== President of the Royal College of Organists ===
After being a member since age 15, Sanger was appointed president of the Royal College of Organists in October 2008, a position he served in until his resignation a week before his death.

== Indecent assault charges and death ==
On 25 May 2010 Sanger appeared in court, charged with four counts of indecent assault and four of gross indecency, all against a boy under the age of 14 and under the age of 16 and all alleged to have taken place between 1978 and 1982. Sanger denied all charges and was released on conditional bail, pending a hearing scheduled for 21 July 2010. Three days later, on 28 May 2010, police announced that Sanger had been found dead at his converted former chapel (which housed a church organ) in Embleton, near Cockermouth, Cumbria.

After Sanger's body had been found, Police stated that they were not looking for anyone else in connection with the death. An inquest was opened 1 June 2010. The inquest subsequently ruled in January 2011 that the cause of death was asphyxia caused by a plastic bag and ligature and that Sanger had killed himself.

== Discography ==
- The Complete Organ Works of J S Bach Vol. I – Meridian Records CDE 84081
- The Complete Organ Works of J S Bach Vol. II – Meridian Records CDE 84144
- The Complete Organ Works of J S Bach Vol. III – Meridian Records CDE 84203
- The Complete Organ Works of J S Bach Vol. IV – Meridian Records CDE 84209
- The Complete Organ Works of J S Bach Vol. V – Meridian Records CDE 84235
- The Complete Organ Works of J S Bach Vol. VI – Meridian Records CDE 84326
- The Complete Organ Works of J S Bach Vol. VII – Meridian Records CDE 84377
- The Complete Organ Works of J S Bach Vol. VIII – Meridian Records CDE 84378
- The Complete Organ Works of J S Bach Vol. IX – Euridice (unpublished recordings [April 2010] from Bodin Parish church, Norway. Organ 2003 by Heiko Lorenz, Wilhelmshaven)
- The Complete Organ Works of J S Bach Vol. X – Euridice (unpublished recordings [April 2010] from Bodin Parish church, Norway. Organ 2003 by Heiko Lorenz, Wilhelmshaven)
- The Complete Organ Works of J S Bach Vol. XI – Euridice (unpublished recordings [April 2010] from Bodin Parish church, Norway. Organ 2003 by Heiko Lorenz, Wilhelmshaven)
- Lefébure-Wély popular organ works – Meridian Records CDE 84296
- Carols from Salisbury – the Cathedral Choir conducted by Richard Seal, accompanied by Colin Walsh – Meridian Records CDE 84068
- Vierne Organ Symphonies 1 & 2 – Meridian Records CDE 84192
- Vierne Organ Symphonies 3 & 4 – Meridian Records CDE 84176
- Vierne Organ Symphonies 5 & 6 – Meridian Records CDE 84171
- Liszt organ works – Meridian Records CDE 84060
- "In the Pleasant Groves" music by Handel – Meridian Records CDE 84157
- César Franck complete organ works – BIS Records BIS CD 214/215
- Duets for organ with Hans Fagius – BIS Records BIS CD 273
- Boëllmann Suite Gothique, opus 25, Mulet "Tu es petra", Jongen Sonata Eroica, opus 94, Gigout menuetto – Saga Classics SDC 9033
- Widor Symphony 5 (complete), Symphony 6 (1st mvt), Symphony 8 (Adagio only) – Saga Classics SDC 9048 (Re-issued 1/2016 with the contents of SDC 9033 on Alto ALC 1292)
- Franck Grande Pièce Symphonique, opus 17 – Resonance 445 014 – 2

== Publications ==
- "Magnificat & Nunc Dimittis (St. Paul's Service)" (SSA & organ) – Banks Music Publications
- "Magnificat & Nunc Dimittis (St. Paul’s Service)" (SATB & organ) – Banks Music Publications
- "O Filii et Filiae" (SATB, Congregation & (two) organ(s)) – Banks Music Publications
- "Mass for the Parishes" (SATB and organ, with optional congregational participation) – Banks Music Publications
- "Missa Brevis" (SSA & organ) – United Music Publishers
- "Go Forth into the World in Peace (A Blessing)" (SATB & organ) – Banks Music Publications
- "Let All the World in Every Corner Sing" (SATB, baritone soloist and organ) – Banks Music Publications
- "Father, We Thank Thee for the Night" (S and optional A, and organ) – Banks Music Publications
- "Salve Regina" (SATB, unaccompanied) – Banks Music Publications
- "Spring Rising!" (SATB, soloists and piano) – Banks Music Publications
- "Sweet Was the Song the Virgin Sang" (SATB, unaccompanied) – Banks Music Publications
- "Shepherds, Shake Off Your Drowsy Sleep!" (SATB & organ) – Banks Music Publications
- "Whence is That Goodly Fragrance?" (SATB & organ) – Banks Music Publications
- "From East to West" (SATB & organ) – Oxford University Press
- "Christmas Day" (SATB & organ) – Oxford University Press
- "The Sun Has Got His Hat on" (close harmony arrangement) – Banks Music Publications
- "Sonata Forte Piano per Organo" – Banks Music Publications
- "Nocturne" – Banks Music Publications
- "Prelude and Fugue for St. Paul’s" – Banks Music Publications
- "Petite Suite Française" – Banks Music Publications
- "Four Miniature Ostinatos" – Banks Music Publications
- "Marche Européenne" – Banks Music Publications
- "A Christmas Rhapsody" – Banks Music Publications
- "Play the Organ, Volumes 1 & 2" – Novello
- "Lakeland String Suite" – Banks Music Publications
- "Introduction, Passacaglia & Fugue in E flat minor" Healey Willan – Oxford University Press
- "Voluntary in C by Johann Pepusch" – Oxford University Press
- Favourite Organ Music by J. A. Lefébure-Wély, 2 volumes – Oxford University Press
