= St Albans International Organ Festival =

The International Organ Festival (IOF) is a biennial music festival and organ competition held in St Albans, England since 1963. Originally held annually, it was changed to every two years in 1965 due to the complexity of organising the increasingly ambitious programme. The festival is run mainly by volunteers.

== Background ==
The festival was conceived by the organist and choirmaster of St Albans Cathedral, Peter Hurford, to celebrate the building of a new organ at the cathedral by Harrison & Harrison. The main competitions are still conducted on this instrument, its eclectic style and modern electropneumatic action now complemented by another self-contained tracker action instrument which the International Organ Festival Society, the charity which runs the Festival, has had built for its own use and sited at St Saviour's Church, St Albans. This was built by Peter Collins in the style of, and in homage to, the early 18th century German organ builder Andreas Silbermann. There is a new (2005) organ in St Peter's Church, St Albans by Mander Organs, which played a role in the festival and competitions from 2007.

Recent competitions have also visited London. Competition rounds are regularly held at Christ Church Spitalfields and the Royal Academy of Music. In 2017 a concerto final was held at St John's Smith Square.

There are two main competitions, the interpretation competition and the improvisation competition (also known as the Tournemire Prize). Judges have included Piet Kee, Marie-Claire Alain, Anton Heiller, Ralph Downes, Harry Croft-Jackson, Thomas Trotter, Ton Koopman, Naji Hakim, Daniel Roth and David Sanger. The competition is considered prestigious, as may be judged by the list of past winners (starting with Susan Landale in 1963 and Gillian Weir in 1964), and judges have occasionally decided not to award first prize.

The Artistic Director and Executive Director since 2007 is David Titterington, professor of organ at the Royal Academy of Music.

The 2027 festival and competitions will take place from 7 to 17 July.

== The Festival ==
The festival's associated concert series includes large orchestral and choral works, chamber music and solo performances, as well as evening jazz. The Three Choirs concert is an audience favourite, in which over the years the choristers of St Albans Cathedral have been joined by many of England's most celebrated cathedral choirs (for instance, in 2013 Salisbury Cathedral & York Minster, in 2015 Christ Church Cathedral, Oxford and Westminster Cathedral, and in 2017 St Paul's Cathedral & Temple Church).

Many of the great orchestras (the Royal Philharmonic Orchestra, the Royal Liverpool Philharmonic Orchestra and others) have played in the Festival, and there have been recitals and concerts from performers such as John Williams, Sarah Walker, Musica Antiqua Köln, Evelyn Glennie, Emma Kirkby, James Bowman and Julian Perkins. Concerts have sometimes been broadcast on BBC Radio 3. Many concerts take place in the Cathedral, but the Festival takes place all over St Albans with other regular venues including St Peter's Church and St Saviour's Church.

The 2021 Festival was one of the first events to take place after Covid-19 restrictions were partially relaxed in the UK. Performers included Nicola Benedetti with Aurora Orchestra, Tenebrae, Jess Gillam, Steven Osborne and Roderick Williams.

== The Fringe ==
The IOF Fringe has presented community-focused performances in a wide range of formal and unconventional venues.

Events were mostly outdoors in historic parts of the City such as in front of the Clock Tower and in the Tudor streets of St Michael's or in the Alban Arena. Artists taking part included Seth Lakeman, The Swanvesta Social Club and Isla St Clair.

Previously, cabaret events and other entertainment had been run as part of the festival, including performances from Richard Stilgoe, Jake Thackray, Instant Sunshine and others.

== Past winners ==
The following individuals have won prizes at the festival.

=== Interpretation competition ===
- 1963 Susan Landale, UK
- 1964 Gillian Weir, UK
- 1965 Hans Joachim Bartsch, Germany
- 1967 Danièle Gullo, France
- 1969 David Sanger, UK
- 1971 Larry Cortner, USA
- 1973 Jan Overduin, The Netherlands / Walter Glyn Jenkins, UK
- 1975 Lynne Davis, USA
- 1977 Peggy Haas, USA / Marcus Huxley, UK (joint second)
- 1979 Thomas Trotter, UK
- 1981 David Rowland, UK (second prize)
- 1983 Kevin Bowyer, UK
- 1985 Kimberly Marshall, USA
- 1985 Diane Meredith Belcher, USA (second prize)
- 1987 Bas de Vroome, The Netherlands (second prize)
- 1989 Mikael Wahlin, Sweden
- 1991 Joseph Adam, USA
- 1993 Gabriel Marghieri, France
- 1995 Mattias Wager, Sweden
- 1997 David Goode, UK (second prize)
- 1999 Pier-Damiano Peretti, Italy
- 2001 Johannes Unger, Germany
- 2003 Herman Jordaan, South Africa
- 2005 Andrew Dewar, UK
- 2007 Ulrich Walther, Germany
- 2009 Konstantin Volostnov, Russia
- 2011 David Baskeyfield, UK
- 2013 Simon Thomas Jacobs, UK
- 2015 Johannes Zeinler, Austria
- 2017 Thomas Gaynor, New Zealand
- 2019 Kumi Choi, South Korea
- 2021 Competition was held virtually due to Covid-19, with no first prize
- 2023 Sunkyung Noh, South Korea (60th anniversary competition)
- 2025 Alexis Grizard, France

=== Improvisation competition ===
- 1963 Guy Bovet, Switzerland
- 1964 André Isoir, France
- 1971 Hans Eugen Frischknecht, Switzerland
- 1973 Kees van Ersel, The Netherlands
- 1975 Nathan Ensign, USA
- 1977 Jos van der Kooy, The Netherlands
- 1979 Christoph Tietze, USA
- 1983 Naji Hakim, France
- 1985 Marie-Bernadette Dufourcet-Hakim, France
- 1987 David Drury, Australia
- 1991 Christoph Kuhlmann, Germany
- 1993 David Briggs, UK
- 1997 Martin Baker, UK
- 2001 Hayo Boerema, The Netherlands / Thomas Lennartz, Germany (joint second)
- 2003 Robert Houssart, The Netherlands
- 2005 Gerben Mourik, The Netherlands
- 2007 not awarded
- 2009 Jean-Baptiste Dupont, France
- 2011 Paul Goussot, France
- 2013 Martin Sturm, Germany
- 2015 David Cassan, France
- 2017 not awarded
- 2019 Gabriele Agrimonti, Italy
- 2021 No improvisation competition was held
- 2023 Samuel Gaskin, USA and Niklas Jahn, Germany (joint first prize)
- 2025 No first prize was awarded for improvisation
