= Yang Yi (translator) =

Chinese literary translator (1919–2023)

- 杨苡
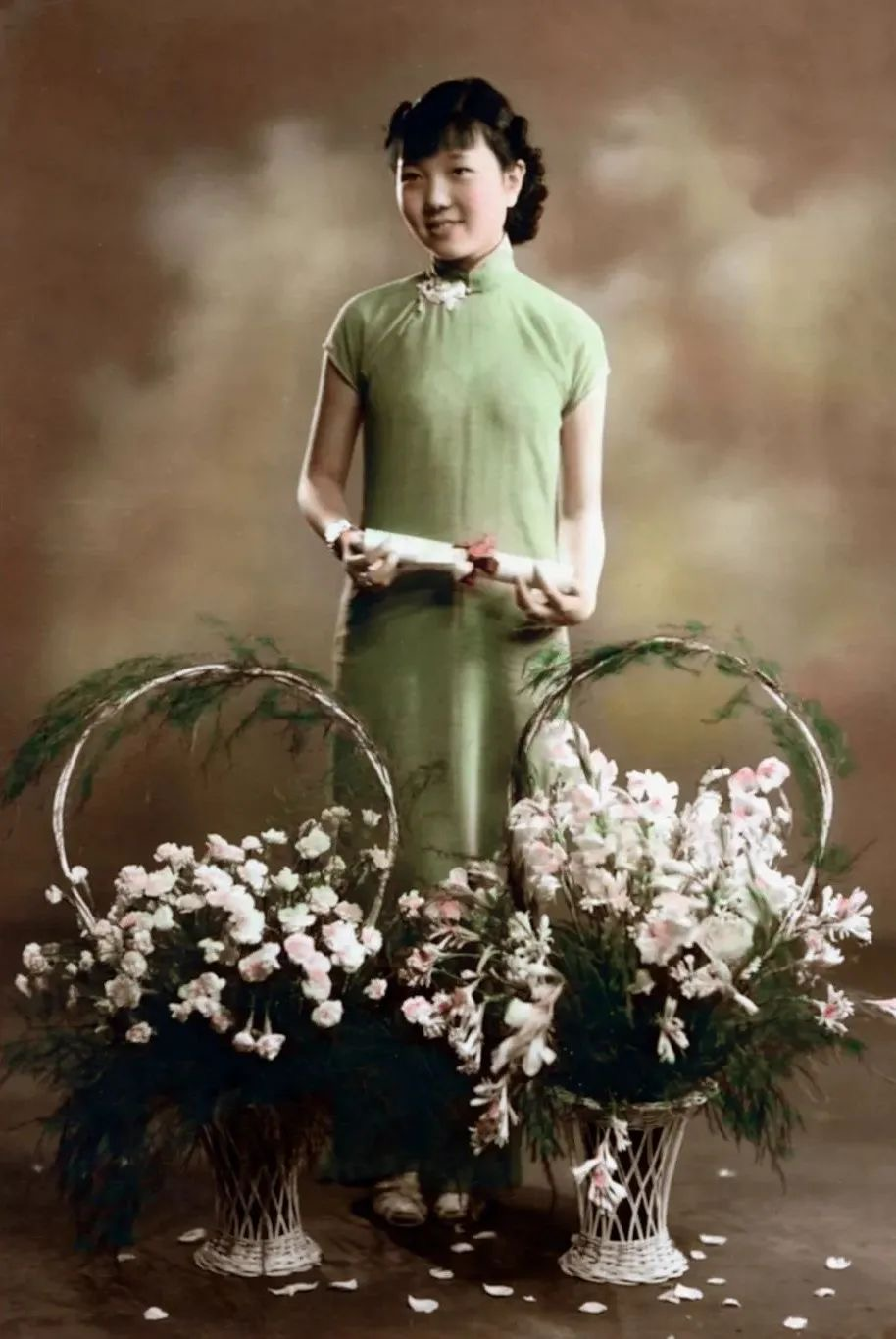
- High school graduation portrait of Yang Yi
- Born: Yang Jingru; 12 September 1919; Tianjin, Republic of China
- Died: 27 January 2023 (aged 103); Nanjing, Jiangsu, China
- Education: Southwestern Associated University; Chongqing National Central University
- Occupation: Translator
- Spouse: Zhao Ruihong
- Relatives: Yang Xianyi; Yang Minru
- Writing career
- Language: Chinese, English
- Period: 1935–2022
- Genre: Novel
- Notable work: Wuthering Heights (translation)

Chinese name
- Traditional Chinese: 楊苡
- Simplified Chinese: 杨苡
Transcriptions
Standard Mandarin
- Hanyu Pinyin: Yáng Yì
- Bopomofo: ㄧㄤˊ ㄧˋ
- Gwoyeu Romatzyh: Yang Yih

Yang Jingru
- Traditional Chinese: 楊靜如
- Simplified Chinese: 杨静如
Transcriptions
Standard Mandarin
- Hanyu Pinyin: Yáng Jìngrú
- Bopomofo: ㄧㄤˊ ㄐㄧㄥˋㄖㄨˊ
- Gwoyeu Romatzyh: Yang Jinqru

Yang Jingru (Chinese: 杨静如; 12 September 1919 – 27 January 2023), known as Yang Yi (杨苡), was a Chinese translator of literary works. Her translation of Wuthering Heights, called Huxiao Shanzhuang, was reprinted many times since 1980, and is regarded as a classic and authoritative translation in China. She was also well known for her lifelong friendship with Chinese novelist Ba Jin, and her works about the author, including The Collection of the Mud in Snow, a compilation of his letters, and "An Interview with Ba Jin". A writer of poetry, prose, and children's literature, one of her later projects was a book of poems translated by Yang Yi and her brother, Yang Xianyi, who predeceased her in 2009.

In 2019, Yang Yi received a Lifetime Achievement Award from the Nanjing Literature and Art Awards. Her autobiography, an oral history of her life compiled and edited by Nanjing University professor Yu Bin, was published in 2022. A long-time resident of Nanjing, Yang Yi died in January 2023, at the age of 103.

== Early life and education ==
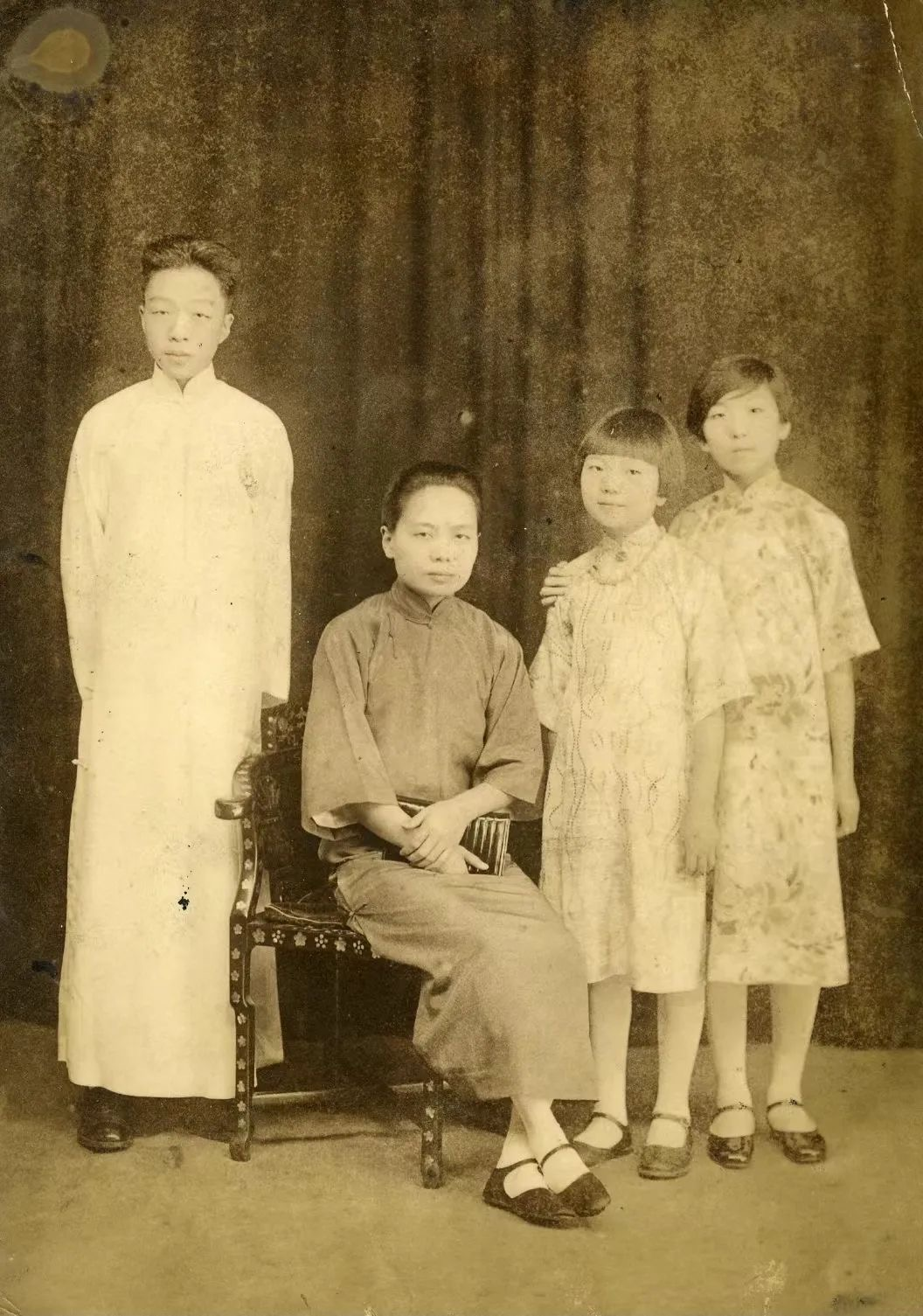
Yang Yi (second from right) with her brother, mother, and sister (c. 1928)

Born in Tianjin in 1919, Yang Jingru was the youngest child of Yang Yuzhang, the first president of the Tianjin branch of Bank of China during the Republican era. Her father, who had married her mother as a second wife, died the year she was born. Her brother, Yang Xianyi, went on to become an internationally known literary translator, while her sister, Yang Minru, became a professor of classical literature.

From the age of eight, Yang attended the church-run Chinese and Western Girls' School, learning English by watching foreign films. In 1935, the 9 December movement made her want to do more than read books to help China resist Japanese aggression. Like many teenagers, Yang read the novel Family by Ba Jin. Depressed by her own circumstances, which she likened to being trapped in a "golden cage", Yang wrote to a formal letter to Ba Jin about her frustration. To her surprise, Ba Jin wrote back, and they continued exchanging letters for over fifty years, bonding over a shared love of literature. She later compiled 60 of the letters Ba Jin had written and annotated them, in a book called The Collection of the Mud in Snow (雪泥集).

Ba Jin assured her that "the future will be beautiful", (Note: The sentence Yang often quoted from Bai was "未来是美好的".) and encouraged her to write. Yang Yi published her first poems in 1936. In 1937, she graduated from high school and was accepted to Nankai University, but her life changed with the capture of northern China including Tianjin by Japanese forces, at the outbreak of the Second Sino-Japanese War. Following the arrest of Shao Gunxiang, the editor-in-chief of a magazine she had contributed to pseudonymously, Yang feared reprisal for the anti-Japanese sentiments in her poetry, and fled Japanese-occupied Tianjin on 7 July 1938, one year after the Marco Polo Bridge Incident. Journeying through British Hong Kong and Annam with one of her cousins, she eventually arrived in Kunming.

In Kunming, Yang entered Southwestern Associated University, originally intending to study Chinese literature. On the advice of writer Shen Congwen, who was teaching at the university, Yang changed her major to English instead, and decided to focus on literary translation in the foreign languages department. Active in campus life, Yang joined the literary society with poets such as Mu Dan, as well as her future husband, Zhao Ruihong; participated in the Yunnan branch of the Anti-enemy Literature and Art Association; and contributed poetry to the magazine Songs of War (战歌) and Ta Kung Pao. After two years, Yang moved to the foreign languages department at Chongqing National Central University. During her college years, Yang studied with many leading scholars of translation such as Chen Jia and Pan Jiaxun.

== Career ==
=== Translation ===
After the war, Yang Yi moved to Nanjing and was a member of the translation committee of the Nanjing National Institute for Compilation and Translation, participating in the translation of works such as The History of the Decline and Fall of the Roman Empire and The Travels of Marco Polo.

==== Wuthering Heights ====
Yang Yi had first discovered Wuthering Heights as a middle school student in Tianjin, when she went to the cinema to watch a Hollywood film adaptation of the novel. In 1944, she happened to find the book in the library at Chongqing Central University. According to Yang, she was motivated to translate Wuthering Heights by Emily Brontë, so that she could prove that it was "superior" to Jane Eyre, the famous novel written by the author's sister, Charlotte Brontë. Ba Jin was supportive of her ambition to retranslate Wuthering Heights, and encouraged her to take her time in translating with great care to convey the true meaning of the original work. She started translating Wuthering Heights in 1953.

In October 1955, Shanghai Pingming, the publishing house founded by Ba Jin in the late 1940s, published Yang Yi's translation of Wuthering Heights, with a first run of 11,000 copies. There was new interest in the novel in China, due in part to Karl Marx's praise for Brontë's critique of the bourgeoisie and capitalist society, and Yang Yi's translation was well received among readers. Although there had been several translations of the novel previously, including those by Wu Guangjian, Liang Shiqiu, and Luo Sai, each of them had used a different title in Chinese. Yang Yi came up with the Chinese title for Wuthering Heights, Huxiao Shanzhuang (呼啸山庄, "whistling/screaming mountain villa"), to convey the natural environment and mood of the setting, and this became the authoritative title for the work in China. According to literary critics, the distinguishing characteristics of Yang Yi's translation included the care and respect with which she described the female characters, as well as her efforts to stay true to the original work, while also carefully choosing words that were accessible to Chinese readers.

Wuthering Heights, like many other works of literature, was suppressed during the Cultural Revolution. During the reform and opening up era, the Jiangsu People's Publishing House started translating and publishing contemporary Western literary works, and was looking for a foreign masterpiece to feature in its collection. On the recommendation of Anhui University professor Wu Ningkun, a former classmate at Southwestern Associated University, the publishing house decided to re-release Wuthering Heights. Twenty-five years after it was first published, Yang Yi revised her 1955 translation, adapting some of the language in light of the more "diverse" readership in contemporary China, and familiarised herself with issues such as typefaces and layout to provide input as the book was prepared for publication.

In July 1980, Yang Yi's updated translation was published by Jiangsu People's Publishing House, with an initial sold-run run of 350,000 copies. Hunan Publishing House worked with Yang Yi to release an abridged edition of Wuthering Heights as part of a set of world literature classics. From 1990, Wuthering Heights was published by Yilin Publishing House, and by June 2001, it had been reprinted a total of 15 times. In subsequent years, Yilin released hardcover, paperback, and abridged editions of Yang Yi's translation, and had considerable success with sales, with 26 further printings over a ten-year period.

Over time, Yang Yi's translation of Wuthering Heights endured as the "stand out" translation in China, even as over one hundred translations coexisted during the "translation boom" in later years. Her translation won the Nanjing Jinling Literature Prize for 1979–1986, the only translated work to be so honored, and received the 7th National Excellent Bestseller Award. Yang Yi's translation has also been distributed by another publisher in Taiwan, and as of 2019, was the only Chinese version held in the collection of the Brontë Parsonage Museum.

==== Other translated works ====
Yang Yi's other highly acclaimed translations included the Chinese translation of William Blake's Songs of Innocence and of Experience (天真与经验之歌), as well as David Weiss's Naked Came I: A Novel of Rodin (我赤裸裸地来：罗丹传), a biographical novel about sculptor Auguste Rodin.

In addition, she translated the English versions of works from the Soviet Union, including Aleksey Nikolayevich Tolstoy's The Russian Character (俄罗斯性格) and a novel called The Never-Setting Sun (永远不会落的太阳), both of which were reprinted many times in large volumes in China.

Following the re-release of Wuthering Heights, Yang Yi worked with a group of young translators on the Chinese edition of W. Somerset Maugham's Ten Novels and Their Authors, and translated the chapter on "Emily Brontë and Wuthering Heights".

=== Teaching ===
After graduating from university Yang Yi taught English as a middle school teacher. In 1949, she started teaching Chinese. In 1956, she was sent to Karl Marx University in Leipzig, East Germany, where she was a lecturer with the school of Oriental languages for one year.

From 1960 onward, Yang Yi taught at Nanjing Normal University in the department of foreign languages. From 1966 to 1972, her teaching career was interrupted by the Cultural Revolution, when she was subjected to criticism, isolation, and hard labor for having translated Wuthering Heights, and having "preached the theory of class reconciliation and the extinction of class struggle", "advocated the supremacy of love", and other crimes. Her brother, literary translator Yang Xianyi, and her sister-in-law, Gladys Yang, were both imprisoned as "class enemies" during this period. In 1972, Yang Yi was "released" and resumed working at Nanjing Normal University, teaching "general reading" before being transferred to the United Nations document translation group. In 1980, she decided to resign and retire from the university, rather than wait for a promotion to professor.

=== Writing and editing ===
==== Children's literature ====
After returning from East Germany, Yang Yi became a special editor at the journal Yuhua literature monthly, and began writing poetry for children. During the Anti-Rightist Campaign years, her works for children including "The Story of Problems" and "The Story of the Cinema" were heavily criticized by party members in Jiangsu for being "reactionary", despite receiving critical acclaim in other parts of the country, such as Beijing and Shanghai. Nevertheless, in 1958, Yang Yi's poem "Beijing–Moscow" was published in the Anthology of Children's Literature by the People's Literature Publishing House, and in 1959, her poem "Do Your Own Things by Yourself" (自己的事自己做) won the Outstanding Children's Literature Award on the occasion of the tenth anniversary of the founding of the People's Republic of China.

==== Works on Ba Jin ====
Starting in 1935, Yang Yi exchanged letters with Ba Jin for 69 years. Over the years, many of Ba Jin's letters were lost or destroyed. In 1938, when Japanese forces entered the French concession in Tianjin, Yang's mother burned more than a dozen of his letters. Several more of his letters were lost as Yang Yi traveled to Kunming and Chongqing. During the Cultural Revolution, she reluctantly destroyed letters that might be "incriminate" Ba Jin, such as a letter from the early 1960s in which he had described the environment of "criticism" that had emerged in China, and gave 23 of his letters to friends for safekeeping.

Following a confrontation with Red Guards who slapped her for not cooperating, Yang Yi handed over 23 letters from Ba Jin to a task force, warning them that they would be held responsible in the future if any of the letters went missing. When she was finally "cleared" in 1972, all the letters were returned to her.

In 1981, she wrote "An Interview with Ba Jin", which was published by Panda Books in an edited volume introducing Western readers to his works. In 1987, Yang Yi compiled 60 of the remaining letters she had from Ba Jin in a volume called The Collection of the Mud in Snow (雪泥集). She annotated the letters and wrote a postscript for the book, which was published by Sanlian Press. In the letters, Ba Jin discusses literature, books, and periodicals – the art of creation and translation, as well as the business of book publishing – and recommends and critiques various works, including Yang Yi's own writing and translation. On 22 November 1997, Yang Yi went to Shanghai East China Hospital to visit Ba Jin for the last time. His last words to her were, "Write more."

==== Works in later years ====
Once she retired from teaching, Yang Yi spent more time on writing shorter pieces such as essays and novellas, noted for their wit and satire. In 1986, her article "Dreaming of Xiaoshan", in which she remembers her college classmate and friend who married Ba Jin, received a readers' choice award from People's Literature Magazine. Her other prose works included "Three Mountains", which won second place in the inaugural national microfiction competition, and "Moonlight Like a Dream", which placed second in the Jinling Mingyue Prose Competition.

After her brother, Yang Xianyi, died in 2009, Yang Yi compiled and edited a volume of poetry translated by her late brother and herself. First published in 2012, an updated edition was published in 2022 by Chinese Translation Publishing House. Called Brother–Sister Translated Poems (兄妹译诗) or Translated Poems by Yang Xianyi and Yang Yi, it features more than 100 of their favorite poems. Most of the poems are translated from English, and include modern classics such as "Loveliest of Trees" by A. E. Housman, "The Hollow Men" by T. S. Eliot, and "Solomon and the Witch" by W. B. Yeats. The 2022 edition includes a poem which had been cut from the original due to its length – "The Prisoner of Chillon" by Lord Byron – translated by Yang Yi.

== Personal life and death ==
Yang Yi met Zhao Ruihong at Southwestern Associated University in Kunming. They married on 13 August 1940, publishing a newspaper announcement but foregoing a formal wedding due to the ongoing war. Zhao was also a translator and literary expert, known for his Chinese translation of The Red and the Black by Stendhal, and was a co-founder of the Chinese Society of Comparative Literature. One of their children is writer and painter Zhao Heng.

An oral autobiography of Yang Yi's life, One Hundred Years, Many People, Many Things, was published in 2022. She died on 27 January 2023, aged 103.
