= Destiny Waltz =

Destiny Waltz may refer to:

- A composition by Sydney Baynes
- A novel by Gerda Charles
