= Thomas (Burton novel) =

1969 novel by Hester Burton

Thomas; or Beyond the Weir Bridge
- First edition cover
- Author: Hester Burton
- Language: English
- Genre: War novel, Family saga
- Publisher: Oxford University Press (UK); Crowell & Co. (US)
- Publication date: UK: 1969; US: 1970
- Publication place: United Kingdom
- Media type: Print (Hardback)
- Pages: 221
- Preceded by: Otmoor for Ever (1968)
- Followed by: Through the Fire (1969)

Thomas is a 1969 novel by Hester Burton, published in the US as Beyond the Weir Bridge. The story follows three friends as they grow up in the political and religious turmoil following the end of the Wars of the Three Kingdoms in 1651, including the Restoration of Charles II in 1660, the 1665 Plague and the 1666 Fire of London. In common with other novels by Hester Burton, it is a well-written and historically accurate viewpoint of this period.

== Background and publication ==
In the UK, the novel was published as Thomas in 1969 by the Oxford University Press and in 1970 in the US by Crowell & Co., where the title was changed to Beyond the Weir Bridge. At the same time, Burton also published Through the Fire which explores many of the same themes but for a younger audience.

== Plot summary ==
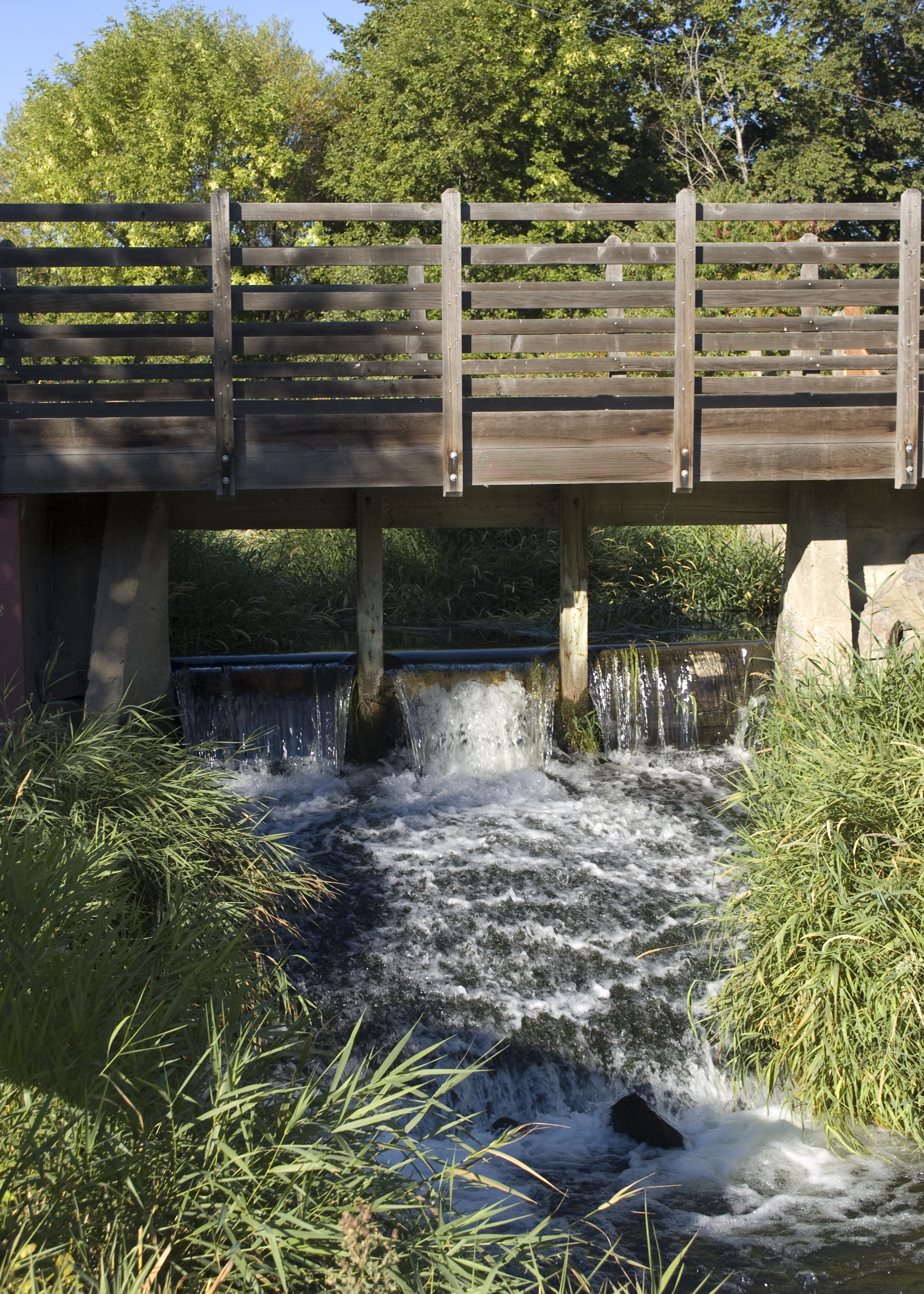
A weir bridge; Thorp, Washington, USA.

The three main characters are Richard, Richenda and Thomas, who gives his name to the book's UK title. We first encounter them at the age of 7, at the end of the wars modern historians customarily refer to as the Wars of the Three Kingdoms.

Richard's father dies of fever while serving in a Parliamentary garrison at Arundel Castle, during the First English Civil War in 1644; his death embittered his mother, who has little affection for her son and remarries a stern and unsympathetic Puritan. This is based on Thomas Springate, who died of fever at Arundel in 1644; his wife, Lady Mary Springate, was eight months pregnant but travelled to be with him. She later wrote a detailed account for her posthumous daughter, who married the Quaker leader, William Penn.

Richenda is the daughter of her close friend who looks after Richard and the two grow up together; both are impulsive and strong-willed, in contrast to the third character, Thomas. His father is a Royalist who owns the local estate where Richenda's family lives but has been ruined by the war.

Richard and Richenda befriend Thomas, who is quiet and studious but also shows he is a person of integrity and courage. He demonstrates this early in the book by crossing a narrow bridge or plank laid across a local weir, hence the title used in the US of Beyond the Weir Bridge.

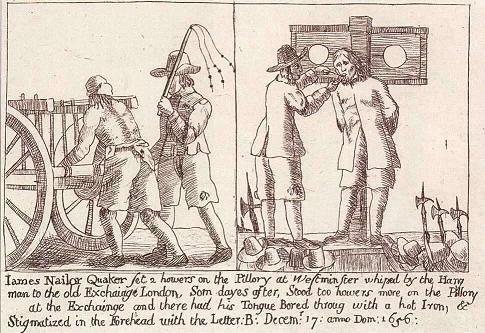
Quaker James Nayler being pilloried and whipped; as Quakers, Thomas and Richenda were persecuted by the Restoration government.

The novel follows the three through the turbulent period that followed the Restoration of Charles II in 1660, ending with the Great Fire of 1666. Richard is expelled from Cambridge and disowned by his parents but becomes an assistant to a London doctor. Richenda and Thomas join the Quakers, which causes a breach between Thomas and his father, as well as the three friends; Burton does a good job of explaining why memories of the recent civil war meant sects like the Quakers were seen as dangerous. This was also historically accurate, since there were a number of attempted revolts by Puritan radicals, including that led by Thomas Venner in January 1661.

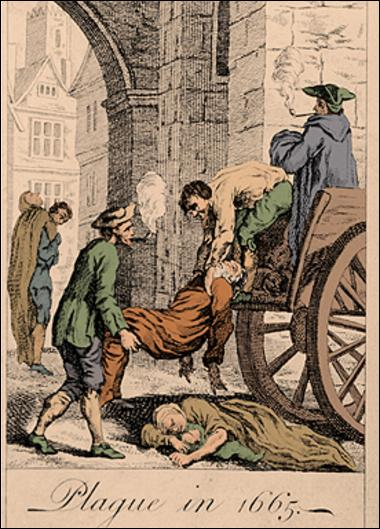
The Great Plague of London, 1665; collecting the dead for burial

Thomas and Richenda fall in love, marry and have a child together, with Thomas inheriting his father's lands, although they are persecuted for being Quakers. When the Plague breaks out in 1665, Richard and his master are among the few doctors to remain, an historically accurate fact; one of his patients is a young Quaker woman whose faith and humanity restores his confidence in people. Thomas feels called to go to London and help Richard tend the sick but later dies of the plague himself.

Thomas's sacrifice and his own experience changes Richard's views and he becomes far more tolerant. Richenda returns home to take over the estate, while Richard occasionally visits and it is only when the Great Fire destroys much of London in 1666 that she realises she loves him. The story ends with Richard rescuing Thomas's son as he too runs across the weir bridge.

The novel shows different responses to adversity and loss; Richard's mother and Thomas' father become bitter and intolerant as a result but Thomas and later Richard himself avoid this. Like her other books, 'Beyond the Weir Bridge' reflects the impact of inequalities in society on her protagonists, their willingness to challenge these and the importance of education in that process.

== Reviews and assessment ==
The Oxford Encyclopedia of Children's Literature summarises Burton's novels as "featuring heroines with strong opinions... class tensions and social justice are recurring themes....(and) accounts of ordinary young people affected by national events." Despite being titled Thomas in the UK, Richenda is the emotional heart of the story and the novel exemplifies these characteristics.

In her obituary, the Daily Telegraph described Thomas as "...perhaps her most sensitive novel." It was nominated for the Boston Globe–Horn Book Award in 1971, the winner that year being Eleanor Cameron's A Room Made of Windows.

== Sources ==
- Royle, Trevor (2004). Civil War: The War of the Three Kingdoms 1638-1660. Brown, Little. ISBN 978-0316861250.
