= Ingaret Giffard =

British actress and author

Ingaret Giffard, Lady Van der Post (1902 – 5 May 1997), was a British actress and writer, and the second wife of Sir Laurens Van der Post (CBE).

== Playwright ==
Born in England, she lived with her family for four years in India, after which, back in London, she began acting and writing plays. One of her plays, "Because We Must," with Vivien Leigh, Alan Napier, Howard Wyndham, and Bronson Albery, was staged at Wyndham's Theater in 1937.

== Marriage ==
Giffard also travelled to the Sudan and to South Africa. She met Van der Post in London in 1936, where he was working as a journalist. He had been born, raised, and started his career in South Africa. They were both married to others when they met. It was only in 1949 that they were free to marry each other.

== Relationship with Carl Jung ==
Giffard introduced her husband to Carl G. Jung, whose analytic techniques had helped her troubled mother. The Van der Posts moved to Switzerland, where Jung lived, and became part of his circle of friends. Giffard herself trained as a lay Jungian analyst.

== Memoir ==
Giffard wrote a memoir entitled The Way Things Happen, which was published in 1990 by William Morrow & Co.

== Death ==
She died five months after her husband, in 1997.

== Surviving papers ==
Giffard's papers are held at Durham University Library.
