= Merry Christmas, Mr. Lawrence =

1983 film by Nagisa Ōshima

- Japanese theatrical release poster
- Directed by: Nagisa Ōshima
- Screenplay by: Nagisa Ōshima; Paul Mayersberg
- Based on: The Seed and the Sower; 1963 novel by Sir Laurens van der Post
- Produced by: Jeremy Thomas
- Starring: David Bowie; Tom Conti; Ryuichi Sakamoto; Takeshi Kitano; Jack Thompson
- Cinematography: Toichiro Narushima
- Edited by: Tomoyo Ōshima
- Music by: Ryuichi Sakamoto
- Production companies: National Film Trustee Company; Antares-Nova N.V.; Recorded Picture Company; Oshima Productions; Asahi National Broadcasting; Broadbank Investments
- Distributed by: Shochiku Fuji; Nippon Herald Films (Japan); Palace Pictures (United Kingdom); Everand Films (New Zealand)
- Release dates: 10 May 1983 (Cannes); 28 May 1983 (Japan); 25 August 1983 (United Kingdom)
- Running time: 123 minutes
- Countries: Japan; United Kingdom; New Zealand
- Languages: English; Japanese
- Box office: ¥990 million (Japan rentals) $2.3 million (USA); 2.8 million tickets (overseas)

Merry Christmas, Mr. Lawrence (Japanese: 戦場のメリークリスマス, Hepburn: Senjō no Merī Kurisumasu; lit. 'Battlefield's Merry Christmas'), also known as Furyo (俘虜, Prisoner of War), is a 1983 war film directed by Nagisa Ōshima from a screenplay by Ōshima and Paul Mayersberg. It stars David Bowie, Tom Conti, Ryuichi Sakamoto, Takeshi Kitano, and Jack Thompson. In the film, John Lawrence (Conti), a British prisoner of war in a Japanese camp during World War II, seeks to bridge a deadly divide between a new prisoner and the camp's commander.

The film is based on the experiences of Sir Laurens van der Post as a prisoner of war in Java, particularly his novels The Seed and the Sower (1968) and The Night of the New Moon (1970). Sakamoto also composed and played the score, including the vocal version of the main theme, "Forbidden Colours", with lyrics written and sung by David Sylvian. The film was entered into the 1983 Cannes Film Festival in competition for the Palme d'Or. Sakamoto's score won the film a BAFTA Award for Best Film Music.

== Plot ==
In 1942, Captain Yonoi is the commander of the POW camp in Lebak Sembada in Japanese-occupied Java. A strict adherent to the bushido code, his only connection to the prisoners is the empathetic Lieutenant-Colonel John Lawrence, the only inmate fluent in Japanese, and the abrasive spokesman Group Captain Hicksley, who repeatedly resists Yonoi's attempts to find weapons experts among the prisoners. Lawrence has befriended Sergeant Gengo Hara but remains at odds with the rest of the staff. Summoned to the military trial of the recently captured Major Jack Celliers, Yonoi is fascinated by his resilience and has him interned at the camp. Yonoi confides in Lawrence that he is haunted with shame due to his absence during the February 26 incident, believing he should have died alongside the rebels, implying his focus on honour stems from this. Sensing a kindred spirit in Celliers, Yonoi's fascination grows.

When the inmates are made to fast as punishment for insubordination during the forced seppuku of a guard, Celliers is caught sneaking them food. They discover a smuggled radio during the subsequent investigation, forcing Celliers and Lawrence to accept blame. Yonoi's batman, realizing the hold Celliers has on him, attempts to kill Celliers in his sleep that night, but fails after he wakes up and escapes, freeing Lawrence too. Yonoi catches Celliers and challenges him to a duel in exchange for his freedom, but Celliers refuses. The batman returns and kills himself for his failure, urging Yonoi to kill Celliers before his feelings overpower him.

At the funeral, Lawrence learns that he and Celliers will be executed for the radio to preserve order in the camp. Enraged, he trashes the funeral altar and is forced back into his cell. That night, Celliers reveals to Lawrence that as a teenager, he betrayed his younger brother, long bullied for his hunchback, by refusing to spare him a humiliating and traumatizing initiation ritual at their boarding school. He describes the lifelong shame it caused, paralleling Yonoi's predicament. The pair are released by a drunken Hara after another prisoner confesses to delivering the radio. As they leave, Hara calls out in English, "Merry Christmas, Lawrence!" Although angry at Hara for exceeding his authority, Yonoi only mildly reprimands him.

Realizing that Yonoi wants to replace him with Celliers as spokesman, Hicksley confronts him and they argue about withholding information from each other. Enraged, Yonoi orders the whole camp to form up outside the barracks, including the sick bay's ailing patients, resulting in one's death. Hicksley, who refused to bring out the patients, is to be executed on the spot for his insubordination, but before he can be killed, Celliers breaks rank and kisses Yonoi on each cheek. Caught between a desire for vindication and his feelings for Celliers, a distraught Yonoi collapses and is relieved of duty. The guards beat Celliers and drag him away. Yonoi's sterner replacement has Celliers buried in the sand up to his neck. Yonoi sneaks into his pen and cuts a lock from his hair, moments before his death.

Four years later, Lawrence visits Hara, now a prisoner of the Allies. Hara has learned English and reveals he'll be executed the following day for war crimes. Expressing confusion over the harshness of his sentence given how commonplace his actions were among both sides of the war, he and Lawrence conclude that while the Allies officially won, morally "we are all wrong." They reminisce about Celliers and Yonoi, the latter of whom was reported to have been killed after the war, before bidding each other goodbye. As he is leaving, Hara calls out, "Merry Christmas, Mr. Lawrence!"

== Cast ==
- David Bowie as Maj. Jack "Strafer" Celliers
  - Chris Broun as Jack Celliers (aged 12)
- Tom Conti as Lieutenant-Colonel John Lawrence
- Ryuichi Sakamoto as Captain Yonoi
- Takeshi Kitano as Sergeant Gengo Hara
- Jack Thompson as Group Captain Hicksley
- Johnny Okura as Kanemoto
- Alistair Browning as De Jong
- James Malcolm as Celliers' brother
- Yuya Uchida as Commandant of military prison
- Ryunosuke Kaneda as Colonel Fujimura, President of the Court
- Takashi Naitō as Lieutenant Iwata
- Yuji Honma as Private First Class Yajima
- Tamio Ishikura as Prosecutor
- Rokko Toura as interpreter
- Kan Mikami as Lieutenant Ito
- Hideo Murota as new commandant of the camp

== Production ==
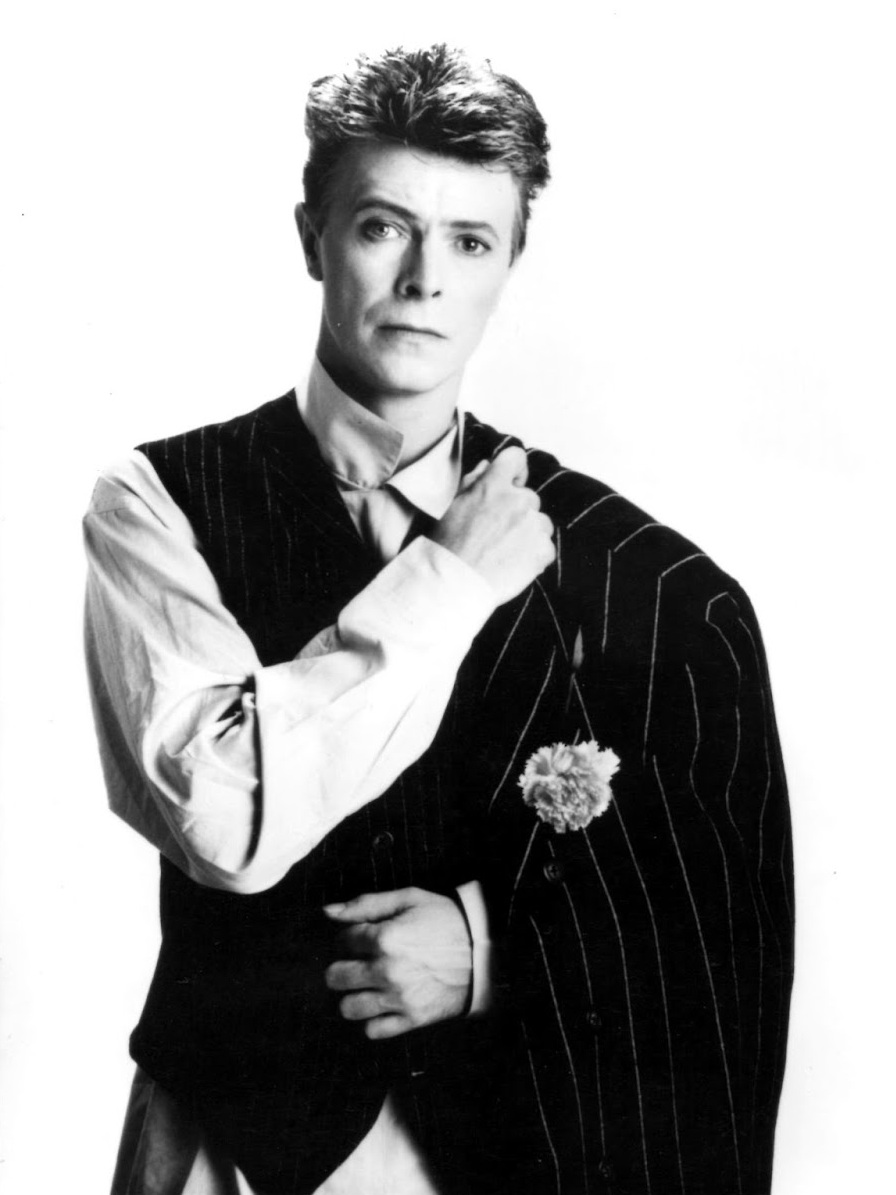
David Bowie was cast as Jack Celliers on the strength of his performance in The Elephant Man.

David Bowie was cast as Jack Celliers after director Nagisa Ōshima saw him in a production of The Elephant Man on Broadway. He felt that Bowie had "an inner spirit that is indestructible". While shooting the film, Bowie was amazed that Ōshima had a two- to three-acre camp built on the remote Polynesian island of Rarotonga, but most of the camp was never shot on film. He said Ōshima "only shot little bits at the corners. I kind of thought it was a waste, but when I saw the movie, it was just so potent – you could feel the camp there, quite definitely." Bowie noted how Ōshima would give an incredible amount of direction to his Japanese actors ("down to the minutest detail"), but when directing him or fellow Westerner Tom Conti, he would say "Please do whatever it is you people do." Bowie thought his performance in the film was "the most credible performance" he had done in a film up to that point in his career.

It was an early international role for Jack Thompson.

The boarding school sequence was shot on location at King's College, a private high school in Auckland, New Zealand. In a shot of two students playing billiards, another boy in the room can be seen wearing a King's blazer. Other scenes were filmed in various locations around Auckland including Auckland Railway Station.

Ōshima chose Ryuichi Sakamoto after seeing his photographs in a photo book Fifty Representative Figures of Today, and without even meeting him. The film was Sakamoto's debut soundtrack just as it was his inaugural acting role. It was also Takeshi ‘Beat’ Kitano's debut movie acting role, having only been known up to that point as a comedian on TV variety shows in Japan.

Contrary to usual cinematic practice, Ōshima shot the film without rushes and shipped the film off the island with no safety prints. "It was all going out of the camera and down to the post office and being wrapped up in brown paper and sent off to Japan", said Bowie. Ōshima's editor in Japan cut the movie into a rough print within four days of Ōshima returning to Japan.

On set, David Bowie made a bond with his on-screen brother, James Malcolm, whom he later called his “New Zealand brother”. For one pivotal scene, Malcolm had to sing for Bowie. The next year, Bowie invited Malcolm to join him on stage at Western Springs in Auckland for the Serious Moonlight Tour, where they released a dove together as a sign of peace.

== Soundtrack ==
Professional ratings
Review scores
| Source | Rating |
|---|---|
| AllMusic | 2.5/5 stars |
| Encyclopedia of Popular Music | 3/5 stars |
| Smash Hits | 6/10 |

Merry Christmas Mr. Lawrence is the soundtrack from the 1983 film Merry Christmas, Mr. Lawrence, released on 1 May 1983 in Japan and in August 1983 in the UK. It was composed by Ryuichi Sakamoto, who also starred in the film. It was Sakamoto's first film score, though it was released several weeks after the film Daijōbu, My Friend, for which he also composed the music.

Despite receiving mixed reviews from critics, the film has since become a cult classic, largely due to its soundtrack. For the film's soundtrack, Sakamoto won the 1984 BAFTA Award for Best Film Music as well as the 1984 Mainichi Film Award for Best Film Score. David Sylvian contributed lyrics and vocals on "Forbidden Colours", a vocal version of the main theme, "Merry Christmas Mr. Lawrence", both of which were released as singles. A special 30th anniversary edition, which included a second CD of tracks, was released in November 2013 in Japan.

== Reception ==
Review aggregator website Rotten Tomatoes gives Merry Christmas, Mr. Lawrence an 86% approval rating and an average rating of 6.60 out of 10 based on 28 reviews. The site's consensus states: "Worthy themes and strong performances across the board make Merry Christmas, Mr. Lawrence an impactful story about bridging cultural divides." Metacritic assigned the film a weighted average score of 53 out of 100, based on 13 critics, indicating "mixed or average reviews".

The New York Times critic Janet Maslin wrote:

David Bowie plays a born leader in Nagisa Ōshima's Merry Christmas Mr. Lawrence, and he plays him like a born film star. Mr. Bowie's screen presence here is mercurial and arresting, and he seems to arrive at this effortlessly, though he manages to do something slyly different in every scene. The demands of his role may sometimes be improbable and elaborate, but Mr. Bowie fills them in a remarkably plain and direct way. Little else in the film is so unaffected or clear.

On the film's Japanese actors, Maslin wrote that

the two main Japanese characters who have brought [Lawrence] to this understanding are Sergeant Hara, a brutal figure who taunts Lawrence while also admiring him, and Captain Yonoi, the handsome young camp commander, who has a fierce belief in the samurai code. Both of these actors perform at an obvious disadvantage, since their English is awkward and the motives of their characters are imperfectly revealed. However, they can convey the complex affinity between captors and prisoners, a point that is made most touchingly in a brief postwar coda.

Director Akira Kurosawa named Merry Christmas, Mr. Lawrence as among his favorite films.

== Box office ==
In Japan, the film earned ¥990 million in distributor rentals. In the United States, it grossed $2,306,560 (equivalent to $7,500,000 in 2025).

It sold 2,385,100 tickets in the United States, France and Sweden (including 1,579,223 in France). It also sold 423,778 tickets in Germany, and 54 tickets in Switzerland and Spain since 2007, for a combined 2,808,932 tickets sold in overseas territories outside of Japan and the United Kingdom.

== See also ==
- List of anti-war films
- List of Christmas films
