= Atlan (novel) =

1965 novel by British writer Jane Gaskell

- Author: Jane Gaskell
- Language: English
- Genre: fantasy, sword & sorcery
- Published: 1965
- Publisher: Hodder and Stoughton
- Publication place: United States
- Media type: Print
- Preceded by: The Serpent (1963)
- Followed by: The City (1966)

Atlan is a fantasy novel by British writer Jane Gaskell. It was first published in 1965. It is the second book in the Atlan series set in prehistoric South America and Atlantis. The first book in the series was The Serpent, and Atlan is followed by two more books, The City and Some Summer Lands.

== Plot summary ==
Atlan is told from the first person point of view of the main character, Cija. Following the events of The Serpent, Cija has married Zerd, a half-human, half-reptilian warlord. Zerd's army has conquered the hidden continent of Atlan (a clear reference to Atlantis) and Zerd now rules as its Emperor with Cija by his side. Zerd has not given up his philandering ways and the couple become estranged. Cija's suffers travails in Atlan, which include assassination attempts, bandits, and misadventures. Complicating matters is an invasion by the Northern army, headed by Zerd's ex-wife Sedili.
