= Yang Xianyi =

Chinese literary translator (1915–2009)

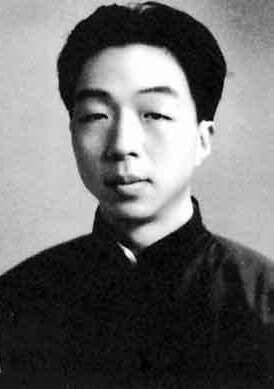
- Yang in 1941
- Born: January 10, 1915; Tianjin, Republic of China
- Died: November 23, 2009 (aged 94); Beijing, People's Republic of China
- Other name: Yang Hsien-i
- Education: Merton College, Oxford (MA)
- Occupation: Translator
- Spouse: Gladys Yang
- Children: 3
- Relatives: Yang Yi (sister)

Yang Xianyi (simplified Chinese: 杨宪益; traditional Chinese: 楊憲益; pinyin: Yáng Xiànyì; Wade–Giles: Yang Hsien-i; January 10, 1915 – November 23, 2009) was a Chinese literary translator, known for rendering many ancient and a few modern Chinese classics into English, including Dream of the Red Mansions.

== Life and career ==
Born into a wealthy banking family in Tianjin, he was sent to Merton College, Oxford to read Classics in 1936.

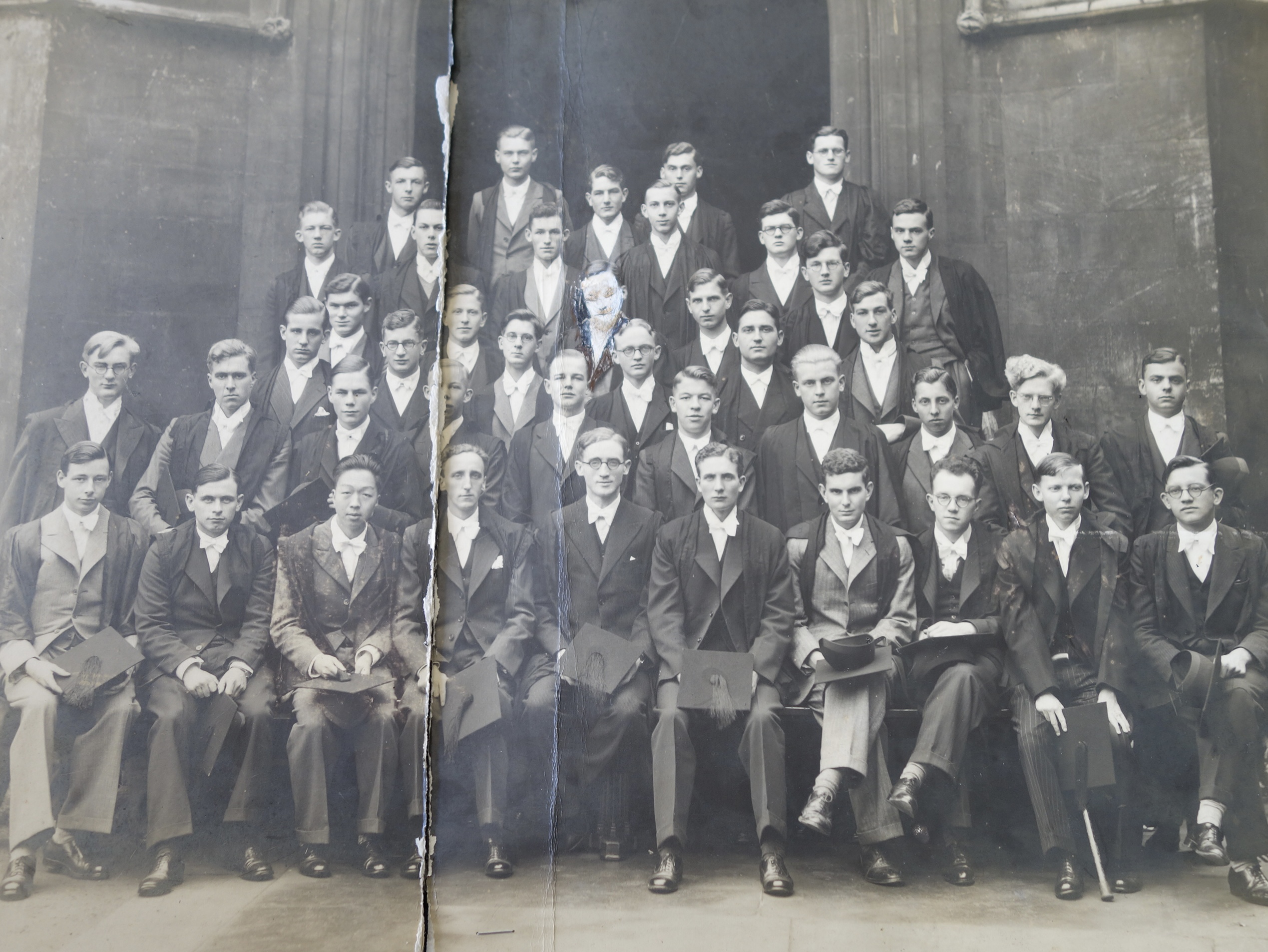
Yang at Merton, third from bottom left, his friend Bunny Mellor bottom right, 1930s.

There he met Gladys Tayler, fell in love. Under his influence, Tayler switched from reading French to Chinese and became Oxford's first graduate with an honours degree in Chinese.

Yang and his fiancee Tayler returned to war-torn China in 1940, got married in 1941 in Chongqing, the wartime capital of Nationalist Gov. They had two daughters and a son, who died by suicide in 1979.While teaching in Chonqing, they began their decades long co-operation of introducing Chinese classics to the English-speaking world. Working for the Foreign Languages Press in Beijing, a government-funded publisher, the husband and wife team produced a number of quality translations. The works translated include classical Chinese poetry; such classic works as A Dream of the Red Mansions, The Scholars, Liu E's Mr. Decadent: Notes Taken in an Outing (老殘遊記), also known as The Travels of Lao Can, and some of Lu Xun's stories.

Yang was also the first one to render the Odyssey into Chinese (prose) from the ancient Greek original. He also translated Aristophanes's Ornithes, Virgil's Georgics, La chanson de Roland and Bernard Shaw's Pygmalion into Chinese.

He narrowly escaped being labeled a "rightist" in 1957-58 for his frank speaking. However, Yang and his wife Gladys were imprisoned for four years as "class enemies" in 1968 during the Cultural Revolution. Gladys died in 1999.

He was also noted for writing doggerel. His autobiography, White Tiger, was published in 2003.

After Yang Xianyi died in 2009, his youngest sister, translator Yang Yi, compiled and edited a book including poetry translated by her late brother. In 2022, a new edition was released by Chinese Translation Publishing House, called Brother–Sister Translated Poems (兄妹译诗) or Translated Poems by Yang Xianyi and Yang Yi, featuring more than 100 of their favorite poems.
