= Collected Poems (Lovecraft) =

1963 collection of poems by H. P. Lovecraft

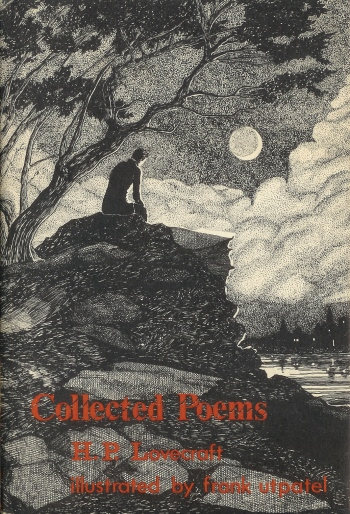
- Jacket illustration by Frank Utpatel for Collected Poems
- Author: H. P. Lovecraft
- Illustrator: Frank Utpatel
- Cover artist: Frank Utpatel
- Language: English
- Genre: poetry
- Publisher: Arkham House
- Publication date: 1963
- Publication place: United States
- Media type: Print (Hardback)
- Pages: 134 pp

Collected Poems is an illustrated collection of poems by H. P. Lovecraft. It was released in 1963 by Arkham House in an edition of 2,013 copies. The editor August Derleth, in his foreword, stated that the book contains the best of Lovecraft's poetry, as well as the second-best and even his earlier work.

== Contents ==
Collected Poems contains the following poems:

1. "Foreword", by August Derleth
2. "Providence"
3. "On a Grecian Colonnade in a Park"
4. "Old Christmas"
5. "New England Fallen"
6. "On a New England Village Seen by Moonlight"
7. "Astrophobos"
8. "Sunset"
9. "To Pan"
10. "A Summer Sunset and Evening"
11. "To Mistress Sophia Simple, Queen of the Cinema"
12. "A Year Off"
13. "Sir Thomas Tryout"
14. "Phaeton"
15. "August"
16. "Death"
17. "To the American Flag"
18. "To a Youth"
19. "My Favorite Character"
20. "To Templeton and Mount Monadnock"
21. "The Poe-et's Nightmare"
22. "Lament for the Vanished Spider"
23. "Regnar Lodbrug's Epicedium"
24. "Little Sam Perkins"
25. "Drinking Song from the Tomb"
26. "The Ancient Track"
27. "The Eidolon"
28. "The Nightmare Lake"
29. "The Outpost"
30. "The Rutted Road"
31. "The Wood"
32. "The House"
33. "The City"
34. "Hallowe'en in a Suburb"
35. "Primavera"
36. "October"
37. "To a Dreamer"
38. "Despair"
39. "Nemesis"
40. "Yule Horror"
41. "To Mr. Finlay, Upon His Drawing for Mr. Bloch's Tale, 'The Faceless God'"
42. "Where Once Poe Walked"
43. "Christmas Greetings to Mrs. Phillips Gamwell—1925"
44. "Brick Row"
45. "The Messenger"
46. "To Klarkash-ton, Lord of Averoigne"
47. "Psychopompos"
48. "The Book"
49. "Pursuit"
50. "The Key"
51. "Recognition"
52. "Homecoming"
53. "The Lamp"
54. "Zaman's Hill"
55. "The Port"
56. "The Courtyard"
57. "The Pigeon-Flyers"
58. "The Well"
59. "The Howler"
60. "Hesperia"
61. "Star Winds"
62. "Antarkos"
63. "The Window"
64. "A Memory"
65. "The Gardens of Yin"
66. "The Bells"
67. "Night Gaunts"
68. "Nyarlathotep"
69. "Azathoth"
70. "Mirage"
71. "The Canal"
72. "St. Toad's"
73. "The Familiars"
74. "The Elder Pharos"
75. "Expectancy"
76. "Nostalgia"
77. "Background"
78. "The Dweller"
79. "Alienation"
80. "Harbour Whistles"
81. "Recapture"
82. "Evening Star"
83. "Continuity"

The 36 poems from "The Book" through "Continuity" form a sequence of sonnets known as Fungi from Yuggoth.

== Reprints ==
- New York: Ballantine, 1971(as Fungi from Yuggoth and Other Poems).
