= Time of Trial =

1963 young adult novel by Hester Burton

- First edition
- Author: Hester Burton
- Illustrator: Victor Ambrus
- Language: English
- Genre: Children's novel
- Publisher: Oxford University Press
- Publication date: 1963
- Publication place: United Kingdom
- Media type: Print (hardback, paperback)
- Pages: 216 pp
- ISBN: 0192712209 (1972 edition)
- OCLC: 557577009

Time of Trial is a 1963 young adult historical novel by Hester Burton. Set in early nineteenth-century England, it addresses the themes of social reform and freedom of speech in a time of war. Burton received the 1963 Carnegie Medal for this novel.

== Setting ==
The novel opens in 1801, when Great Britain is still at war with France. The long war has caused poverty and starvation among the lower classes in England, and the governing classes are anxious about social unrest. The book's two principal locations are Holly Lane, London, where the Pargeters have a bookshop, and Herringsby on the Suffolk coast, a seaside resort and fishing village.

== Plot summary ==
The novel is a third person narrative, mainly centring on the thoughts and experiences of Margaret Pargeter. The Pargeters live on Holly Lane, near St Paul's Cathedral, where they have a bookshop. Robert Kerridge lodges with them while studying medicine. Though poor for gentlefolk, they have a comfortable life compared to many of their neighbours. The bookseller has somewhat radical views and stocks such controversial works as The Rights of Man, which Margaret often feels impelled to hide from customers. Her brother John, who does not share his father's principles, loathes the bookshop and hopes to join the army.

The crisis of the novel is precipitated by a neglected tenement's collapse, which kills all the families who lived there. Inspired by the tragedy, Mr. Pargeter writes and distributes a pamphlet called The New Jerusalem in which he describes his vision of an ideal society. The rich object to his plan to hand over all property to the parishes to be administered for the good of all. He is arrested and found guilty of libelling the landlords and preaching sedition. The poor, on the other hand, object to his plan to prevent children under 14 from working, which they see as likely to make poor families poorer. While he is awaiting trial, a mob attacks his shop and burns it to the ground.

Through the intercession of Robert's father and uncle, Mr. Pargeter's sentence is fairly moderate: six months in the model prison at Ipswich. Dr. Kerridge offers Margaret free lodging in the seaside resort of Herringsbury in Suffolk so that she will be able to visit her father. His hidden agenda is to separate Margaret and his son, as he believes she would be an unsuitable wife for an ambitious doctor. However, despite his family's disapproval, Robert marries Margaret as soon as he is financially independent.

Drama comes to Herringsby when a riding-officer (a customs official) is found murdered. A regiment descends on the village with the intention of routing the smugglers. One of the officers of the regiment is John Pargeter, who had left London after the arrest. He makes peace with his sister and father. Mr. Pargeter plans to open a new bookshop and start a school, now believing that only through literacy and education can his dreams be realized.

== Characters ==
- Margaret Pargeter (sometimes called Meg), a 17-year-old girl, a book lover
- John Pargeter, her older brother, later an officer in the army
- Mr. Pargeter, their elderly father, an idealistic bookseller
- Mrs. Neech, the Pargeters' severe housekeeper
- Elijah, a survivor of the tenement collapse, taken in by the Pargeters
- Robert Kerridge, a medical student in love with Margaret
- Dr. Kerridge, Robert's father, Mr. Pargeter's godson, an aristocratic physician
- Mrs. Kerridge, Robert's mother
- Sir Maurice Kerridge, Robert's uncle, a Member of Parliament
- Mr. Stone, a bookdealer and friend of Mr. Pargeter
- Mrs. Dunnett, a widow, Margaret's landlady in Herringsby
- Lucy Moore, Margaret's friend in Herringsby
- Mr. and Mrs. Moore, their son Dick and Aunt Kitty, Lucy's family, farmers
- Dan Fiske, a fisherman and probably a smuggler

== Reception and literary significance ==
For Time of Trial, Burton won the annual Carnegie Medal, recognising the year's best children's book by a British subject. It was the fourth historical novel to appear on the winning list. In her New York Times review of the novel, Mary Stolz wrote: "When Hester Burton... writes a historical novel, it is not a modern romance with appliqués of research but a sound portrait of the period, presented with unobtrusive scholarship."

== Articles ==
- Hester Burton: "How I Came to Write Time of Trial", The Junior Bookshelf volume 28 (July 1964) pp 135–38.

Awards
Preceded by The Twelve and the Genii	Carnegie Medal recipient 1963	Succeeded by Nordy Bank
