= The Serpent (novel) =

1963 novel by British writer Jane Gaskell

- First edition cover
- Author: Jane Gaskell
- Publisher: Hodder & Stoughton
- Publication date: 1963

The Serpent is a novel by British writer Jane Gaskell. It was first published in 1963. It is the first part of the Atlan series, a set of four (or five) fantasy novels set in prehistory. The following novels are Atlan, The City, and Some Summer Lands. The stories are set in Atlantis and South America.

The Serpent was also published split into two books, titled The Serpent and The Dragon, hence the confusion over the numbering of the volumes.

== Plot summary ==
The protagonist of the novel is Cija (pronounced 'kee-yah'), the illegitimate child of the Dictatress of a small kingdom and a high-ranking priest. The story itself is written from her point of view. She was kept in a tower and looked after by servants until she turned 17; until that time she had not met any men and believed that men were extinct and women ruled the world. She was also raised to believe she was a goddess, related to the gods of her country, to whom she refers to as her "cousins".

When she is 17 years old, her mother releases her from the tower and gives her as a hostage to Zerd, the half-Human, half-Reptilian warlord, leader of an invading army on their way to conquer the mysterious continent of Atlan. Cija is secretly instructed by her mother to seduce and kill Zerd. Eventually, she succeeds neither in killing Zerd, nor in warning the Atlantean empire about the invaders, but she ends up being married to Zerd and becoming Empress of Atlan.

== Reception ==
Colin Greenland reviewed The Serpent for Imagine magazine, and stated that "rich with sensation and vitality that make much more recent fantasy writing look quite pale."

== Reviews ==
- Review by L. Sprague de Camp (1964) in Amra V2n28, June 1964
- Review by Ed Cox (1969) in Science Fiction Review, October 1969
- Review by Charlie Brown (1971) in Locus, #71 January 6, 1971
- Review by Lester del Rey (1979) in Analog Science Fiction/Science Fact, February 1979
- Review by Baird Searles (1979) in Isaac Asimov's Science Fiction Magazine, June 1979
- Review by Susan L. Nickerson (1979) in Science Fiction & Fantasy Book Review, August 1979
- Review by James Cawthorn and Michael Moorcock (1988) in Fantasy: The 100 Best Books
- Review by Stephen E. Andrews and Nick Rennison (2009) in 100 Must-Read Fantasy Novels
