= The Seed and the Sower =

Book by Laurens van der Post

- First edition
- Author: Laurens van der Post
- Language: English
- Publisher: Hogarth Press (UK)
- Publication date: 1963
- Publication place: South Africa
- Media type: Print (Hardcover & Paperback)
- Pages: 246
- ISBN: 0701132353 (1987 edition)
- Preceded by: The Heart of the Hunter
- Followed by: Journey into Russia

The Seed and the Sower is a book by South African writer Laurens van der Post, consisting of three interrelated stories blended into a novel, first published in 1963. The novel was filmed in 1983 as Merry Christmas, Mr. Lawrence, directed by Nagisa Ōshima.

== Plot ==
The first story is set in a Japanese administered POW camp in Java during World War II and is a first person account of the relationship between John Lawrence, a British officer, and Sergeant Hara, one of the camp’s senior guards. This segment was initially published as a short story in 1956 as A Bar of Shadow.

The second, lengthier story is also set in a POW camp, narrated in the third person from the diary of Major Celliers, a South African officer serving in the British Army, who perished in the camp and his relationships with his disabled brother and with the camp commandant, Captain Yonoi. Both of the first two stories attempt to convey the conflicting feelings the principal characters felt towards each other and their attempts to understand each other’s cultures and their widely opposed codes of honour.

The final segment is Lawrence’s reminiscence of a brief affair with a woman whose name he never learned, shortly before his imprisonment by the Japanese.

== Reviews ==
- Book Reviews, Sites, Romance, Fantasy, Fiction
- Review: The Seed and the Sower
