= Jan Sonnergaard =

Danish writer

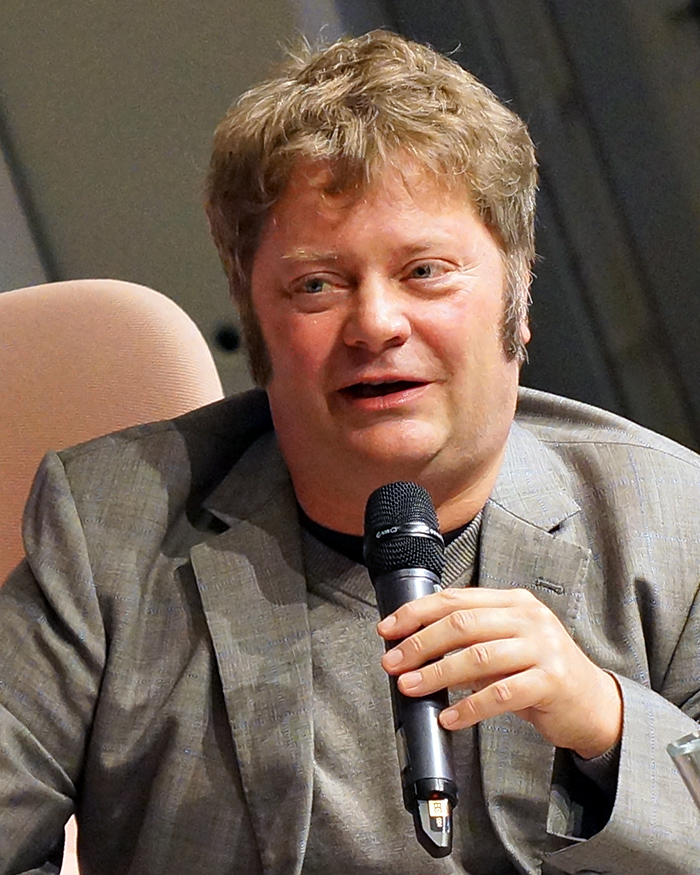
- Sonnergaard in 2014
- Born: August 15, 1963; Copenhagen, Denmark
- Died: November 18, 2016 (aged 53); Belgrade, Serbia
- Education: University of Copenhagen; Cand.mag., 1992

Jan Sonnergaard (15 August 1963—18 November 2016) was a Danish writer, novelist, and playwright.

He is best known for his work Radiator, a collection of short stories released in 1997 which was a provocative and satirical look at Danish society. Many of Sonnergaard's works draw upon his own childhood in Copenhagen and he is noted for his distinctive and unconventional mix of cynical realism and social-surrealism. His works have gained international renown and been translated into many languages.

== Personal life ==
Sonnergaard was born in Copenhagen and grew up in Virum. He received a Cand.mag. degree in comparative literature and philosophy from the University of Copenhagen in 1992. Between 1991 and 1992, he had also studied at the Free University of Berlin.

Sonnergaard died on 21 November 2016 in Belgrade as a result of cardiac arrest. He had been in Belgrade promoting his books and was found dead in the apartment where he was staying. He is buried at Assistens Cemetery in Copenhagen.

== Career ==
After publishing a couple of short stories in various journals and anthologies, Sonnergaard made his literary debut in 1997 with an acclaimed collection of short stories named Radiator, which focused on underclass life and marginalized populations in Denmark. Two more volumes were published in this trilogy: Last Sunday in October (2000) and I am still afraid of Caspar Michael Petersen (2003) which focused on middle and upper class life.

In 2009, he published his first novel, About The Atomic Bomb’s Influence on the Youth of Vilhelm Funk, about the way the nuclear threat of the cold war was a subconscious motivation for many people's lifestyle in the 1980s. In the following years, he published several other novels and collections of short stories. Sonnergaard also authored a play and wrote numerous articles, features, and op-eds in various newspapers and magazines, primarily Politiken.

Thematically, Sonnergaard's works criticize the meaninglessness and monotony of life in modern Denmark. He writes in a very direct and often provocative language that vividly depicts violence, alcohol and eroticism. His literature is always a comment on his time, and his work is always a direct comment on contemporary life. Most of his stories are told from a male perspective and often feature a retrospective glance at Sonnergaard's own youth or a visit to a foreign country. His works have been translated into Icelandic, Norwegian, German, Czech, Italian, Dutch, and Serbo-Croatian. He has also contributed more than ten short stories for the two American magazines: Absinthe and Metamorphoses.

Jan Sonnergaard received several grants from the Danish Arts Foundation, including a three-year scholarship in 2005. He was also a recipient of the Jytte Borberg scholarship, Henri Nathan's Grant, Harald Kiddes and Astrid Ehrencron-Kiddes Grant, and LO's Culture Prize. In 2015, Sonnergaard was appointed by the two Danish authors’ associations to sit on the Arts Foundation's Committee for Literature from 2016 until 2020.

== Bibliography ==
- Radiator, short stories, 1997
- Last Sunday in October, short stories, 2000
- I'm still afraid of Caspar Michael Petersen, short stories, 2003
- About The Atomic Bomb’s Influence on the Youth of Vilhelm Funk, novel, 2009
- Old Stories, short stories, 2009
- Eight Edifying Tales of Love and Food and Foreign Cities, short stories, 2013
- Freezing Wet Roads, novel, 2015
