= False Colours (novel) =

1963 book by Georgette Heyer

- First edition
- Author: Georgette Heyer
- Cover artist: Arthur Barbosa
- Language: English
- Genre: Regency, Romance
- Publisher: The Bodley Head
- Publication date: 1963
- Publication place: United Kingdom
- Media type: Print
- Pages: 352 pp
- OCLC: 166872778
- Dewey Decimal: 823/.912 22
- LC Class: PR6015.E795 F35 2008

False Colours is a Regency romance by Georgette Heyer, published in 1963 in the UK by The Bodley Head and in 1964 by E. P. Dutton in the US. The novel is set in 1817, and concerns a young man who must temporarily impersonate his missing twin brother and the complications brought in the wake of this deceit. In British English, the term 'under false colours' refers to the use of a flag to which one is not entitled as a tactic for purposes of deception, and so by extension to any dishonest manoeuver.

== Plot ==
Alerted by a twin's intuition of trouble, the Honourable Christopher (Kit) Fancot returns to London at dead of night from his diplomatic mission in Vienna and learns that his brother Evelyn, Earl of Denville, has been missing for a number of days. Although this would not normally be a problem, Evelyn is due next day at a reception to be introduced to the family of Cressida (Cressy) Stavely, the heiress to whom he has recently proposed in order to repair the family finances. Knowing how absent-minded his brother is, Kit agrees to attend in Evelyn's place and, thanks to his ready wits and diplomatist's skill, acquits himself satisfactorily.

What had not been anticipated was Evelyn's continued absence, forcing Kit to maintain the rôle with only the connivance of his feather-brained "widgeon" of a mother, the dowager Lady Denville, and two family servants - his brother's personal attendant Fimber and the groom Challow. Kit therefore judges it wisest to retire to Ravenhurst, the family's countryside home in Sussex. However, he is followed there by the tyrannical Dowager Lady Stavely, accompanied by her granddaughter Cressy, who is also Lady Denville's godchild.

Lady Denville now arrives in state at Ravenhurst, having also invited her elder brother, the miserly Cosmo Cliffe, his wife – who turns out to be a distant connection of Cressy's grandmother and so takes on the role of her temporary female companion – and their son Ambrose, a would-be dandy. Another addition to the house party is the portly Sir Bonamy Ripple, a wealthy member of the Prince Regent's social circle and Lady Denville's permanent cicisbeo. During their stay, Kit's true identity is betrayed to Sir Bonamy by the poor quality of his snuff and his lack of dexterity with its container. Even more important, Cressy too deduces who Kit really is, having previously resolved to turn Evelyn down. But she and Kit have by now fallen in love and decide to help each other maintain the deception until Evelyn returns. This is initially made necessary by the sudden appearance of Mrs Alperton, the mother of one of Evelyn's mistresses, in an attempt to blackmail him. Together the two outface her and send her packing.

Cressy's lack of embarrassment at such male peccadilloes is because she had grown used to her widowed father's lifestyle, having served as his housekeeper since she was sixteen. Her need to change household at all is because of Lord Stavely's recent second marriage to the jealous Albinia, whose vulgarity is evidenced by her releasing a report to the press hinting at her step-daughter's coming engagement. It was this news item that had brought Mrs Alperton to Ravenhurst in the first place. It also brings a secret night visit from Evelyn, who has been laid up only ten miles away after overturning his phaeton, giving himself concussion and breaking a few bones. Now he has fallen in love with his rescuers' daughter and is relieved to learn that Kit has solved the problem of his previous engagement.

More complications remain, however, particularly how to repay the huge gaming debts of their impractical mother, which had led Evelyn to propose to Cressy in the first place. Another is how to save Cressy's reputation now that she is going to marry the other twin. Lady Denville solves the first problem by manoeuvring the susceptible Sir Bonamy into proposing marriage to her and so making himself financially responsible for her debts. The second is achieved by concocting a tale of Kit's prior love for Cressy and ensuring her family's silence about his earlier imposture. Her grandmother guarantees this compliance and also promises to gain Lord Stavely's permission for Cressy to marry Kit. With that settled, Kit will leave England as quietly as he arrived and then hurry back later as if nothing had happened.

== Context ==
Two society characters play their part in the background to False Colours. One is the fashionable Duchess of Devonshire, on whose unhappy marriage and passion for gambling Lady Denville's is modelled. She was also created in part for Heyer's friend Anna Neagle, who had asked the novelist to write her "a nice middle aged part" and whose husband Herbert Wilcox had planned adapting this novel for a US TV series.

Beau Brummell, who often figures in Heyer's Regency novels, is twice mentioned. Kit betrays his imposture to Sir Bonamy Ripple in Chapter 11, not only by offering him dry snuff but also by his maladroit way of offering the box, which should have been with "one hand only, and no more than a flick of the nail to open it" in the way made fashionable by Brummell. The time line of the novel is also established by the reference at the end of Chapter 18 to debt having forced "poor Brummel [to] go and live at horridly cheap places" abroad in the previous year.

Although False Colours sold very well, one of Heyer's biographers considered that "this is one book that would have benefitted from a little editing". In addition, her new editor at The Bodley Head, Max Reinhardt, suggested a tempering of the copious Regency slang but was overruled. In the US the novel was the subject of a long and enthusiastic review in Time, which concluded that "in an age of prurience and pornography, Georgette Heyer's main appeal is in the faultless re-creation of a world of manners and decorum". But for all that, sexual relations both within and outside marriage are rather more at the centre of this novel than in many others and are often discussed.
