= Jane Gaskell =

British fantasy writer

Gaskell as a teenager in Evening News, 1956

Jane Gaskell Denvil (born 7 July 1941) is an English writer of speculative fiction and social realism. She wrote and published her debut weird fiction novel A Strange Evil (1957) as a teenager.

== Early life ==
Jane Gaskell Denvil was born in Lancaster. By her teen years, she lived in Fulham, where her father Andrew Gaskell Denvil ran a news agents shop. He reportedly descended from a brother of William Gaskell.

== Career ==
She wrote her first novel, Strange Evil, at age 14. It was published two years later and was described by John Grant as "a major work of the fantastic imagination", comparing it to George MacDonald's Lilith and David Lindsay's A Voyage to Arcturus. China Miéville lists Strange Evil as one of the top 10 examples of weird fiction whilst John Clute called it "an astonishingly imaginative piece of fantasy by any standards."

Gaskell's horror novel The Shiny Narrow Grin (1964) featured a sympathetic, tormented vampire and was described by Brian Stableford as one of the first "revisionist vampire novels", whose most successful exemplar was Interview with the Vampire by Anne Rice. The Shiny Narrow Grin was also listed by horror historian Robert S. Hadji in his list of "unjustly neglected" horror novels.

Her Atlan saga is set in prehistoric South America and in the mythical world of Atlantis. The series is written from the point of view of its clumsy heroine Cija, except for the last book, which is narrated by her daughter Seka. In 1970 she received the Somerset Maugham Award for her novel A Sweet Sweet Summer (jointly with Piers Paul Read for his Monk Dawson). A Sweet, Sweet Summer features aliens visiting a violent future Earth; Baird Searles stated the book makes "A Clockwork Orange look like Winnie the Pooh".

Gaskell wrote several social realism novels, Attic Summer (1963), The Fabulous Heroine (1966), All Neat in Black Stockings (1966) and Summer Coming (1972).

From the 1960s to the 1980s, Gaskell worked as a journalist on the Daily Mail. She later became a professional astrologer.

== Adaptations ==
All Neat in Black Stockings was adapted into a 1969 film directed by Christopher Morahan. Gaskell co-wrote the screenplay with Hugh Whitemore.

== Books ==
=== Standalone novels ===
- Strange Evil (1957)
- King's Daughter (1958)
- Attic Summer (1963)
- The Shiny Narrow Grin (1964)
- The Fabulous Heroine (1966)
- All Neat in Black Stockings (1966)
- A Sweet, Sweet Summer (1969)
- Summer Coming (1972)
- Sun Bubble (1990)

=== The Atlan Saga ===
- Book 1: The Serpent (1963). The first and second halves were reprinted separately as The Serpent and The Dragon in 1975–1985 editions.
- Book 2: Atlan (1965). Renumbered as Book 3 in 1976–1985 editions.
- Book 3: The City (1966). Renumbered as Book 4 in 1976–1985 editions.
- Book 5: Some Summer Lands (1977). Previous books were renumbered prior to this volume and it was therefore described as the fifth in the series.
