= Laurens van der Post =

South African writer (1906–1996)

Sir Laurens van der Post CBE
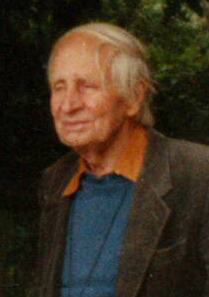
- van der Post in 1994
- Born: Laurens Jan van der Post; 13 December 1906; Philippolis, Orange River Colony, South Africa
- Died: 15 December 1996 (aged 90); London, England
- Resting place: Philippolis, Free State, South Africa
- Education: Grey College, Bloemfontein
- Spouse(s): Marjorie Edith Wendt (1928–1949); Ingaret Giffard (1949–death)
- Children: 3
- Parent(s): Christiaan van der Post; Lammie van der Post
- Military career
- Allegiance: United Kingdom
- Branch: British Army
- Service years: 1940-47
- Rank: Captain
- Units: Intelligence Corps
- Commands: Special Mission 43
- Conflicts: World War II; East African campaign; Pacific War; Battle of Java (surrendered)
- Awards: CBE

Sir Laurens Jan van der Post, CBE (13 December 1906 – 15 December 1996), was a South African Afrikaner writer, farmer, soldier, educator, journalist, humanitarian, philosopher, explorer and conservationist. He was noted for his interest in Jungianism and the Kalahari Bushmen, his experiences during World War II, as well as his relationships with notable figures such as King Charles III and British Prime Minister Margaret Thatcher. After his death, there was controversy over claims that he had exaggerated many aspects of his life, as well the revelation that he had impregnated a 14-year-old girl entrusted to his care.

== Biography ==
=== Early years and education ===
Van der Post was born in the small town of Philippolis in the Orange River Colony, the post-Boer War British name for what had previously been the Afrikaner Orange Free State in what is today South Africa. His father, Christiaan Willem Hendrik van der Post (1856–1914), a Hollander from Leiden, had emigrated to South Africa with his parents and married Johanna Lubbe in 1889. The van der Posts had a total of 13 children, with Laurens being the 13th. The fifth son, Christiaan, was a lawyer and politician who fought in the Second Boer War against the British. After the Second Boer War, Christiaan senior was exiled with his family to Stellenbosch, where Laurens was conceived. They returned to Philippolis, in the Orange River Colony, where he was born in 1906.

He spent his early childhood years on the family farm, and acquired a taste for reading from his father's extensive library, which included Homer and Shakespeare. His father died in August 1914. In 1918, van der Post went to school at Grey College in Bloemfontein. There, he wrote, it was a great shock to him that he was "being educated into something which destroyed the sense of common humanity I shared with the black people". In 1925, he took his first job as a reporter in training at The Natal Advertiser in Durban, where his reporting included his own accomplishments playing on the Durban and Natal field hockey teams. In 1926, he and two other rebellious writers, Roy Campbell and William Plomer, published a satirical magazine called Voorslag (whip lash) which criticised imperialist systems; it lasted for three issues before being forced to shut down because of its controversial views. Later that year he took off for three months with Plomer and sailed to Tokyo and back on a Japanese freighter, the Canada Maru, an experience which produced books by both authors later in life.

In 1927, van der Post met Marjorie Edith Wendt (d. 1995), daughter of the founder and conductor of the Cape Town Orchestra. The couple traveled to England and on 8 March 1928, married at Bridport, Dorset. A son was born on 26 December, named Jan Laurens (later known as John). In 1929, van der Post returned to South Africa to work for the Cape Times, a newspaper in Cape Town, where "For the time being Marjorie and I are living in the most dire poverty that exists," he wrote in his journal. He began to associate with bohemians and intellectuals who were opposed to James Hertzog (Prime Minister) and the white South African policy. In an article entitled 'South Africa in the Melting Pot', which clarified his views of the South Africa racial problem, he said "The white South African has never consciously believed that the native should ever become his equal." However, he predicted that "the process of leveling up and inter-mixture must accelerate continually ... the future civilization of South Africa is, I believe, neither black or white but brown."

=== The Bloomsbury influence ===
In 1931, van der Post returned to England. His friend, Plomer, had been published by the Hogarth Press, a business run by the married couple Leonard Woolf and the novelist Virginia Woolf. The Woolfs were members of the literary and artistic Bloomsbury group, and through Plomer's introductions, van der Post also met figures such as Arthur Waley, J. M. Keynes and E. M. Forster.

In 1934, the Woolfs published van der Post's first novel. Called In a Province, it portrayed the tragic consequences of a racially and ideologically divided South Africa. Later that year, he decided to become a dairy farmer and, possibly with the help of the independently wealthy poet Lilian Bowes Lyon, bought Colley Farm, near Tetbury, Gloucestershire, with Lilian as his neighbor. There he divided his time between the needs of the cows and occasional visits to London, where he was a correspondent for South African newspapers. He considered this a directionless phase in his life which mirrored Europe's slow drift to war.

In 1936, he made five trips to South Africa and during one trip he met and fell in love with Ingaret Giffard (1902–1997), an English actress and author four years his senior. In 1938 he sent his family back to South Africa. When the Second World War began in 1939, he found himself torn between England and South Africa, his new love and his family; his career was at a dead end, and he was in depressed spirits, often drinking heavily.

=== War service ===
In May 1940, van der Post volunteered for the British Army and upon completion of officer training in January 1941 he was sent to East Africa in the Intelligence Corps as a captain. There he took up with General Wingate's Gideon Force which was given the task of restoring the Emperor Haile Selassie to his throne in Abyssinia. His unit led 11,000 camels through difficult mountain terrain and he was remembered for being an excellent caretaker of the animals. In March, he came down with malaria and was sent to Palestine to recover.

In early 1942, as Japanese forces invaded South East Asia, van der Post was transferred to Allied forces in the Dutch East Indies (Indonesia), because of his Dutch language skills. By his own statement, he was given command of Special Mission 43, the purpose of which was to organise the covert evacuation of as many Allied personnel as possible, after the surrender of Java.

On 20 April 1942, he surrendered to the Japanese. He was taken to prison camps first at Sukabumi and then to Bandung. Van der Post was known for his work in maintaining the morale of prisoners of many nationalities. Along with others, he organised a "camp university" with courses from basic literacy to degree-standard ancient history, and he also organized a camp farm to supplement nutritional needs. He could speak some basic Japanese, which helped him greatly. Once, depressed, he wrote in his diary: "It is one of the hardest things in this prison life: the strain caused by being continually in the power of people who are only half-sane and live in a twilight of reason and humanity." He wrote about his prison experiences in A Bar of Shadow (1954), The Seed and the Sower (1963) and The Night of the New Moon (1970). Japanese film director Nagisa Ōshima based his film Merry Christmas, Mr. Lawrence (1982) on The Seed and the Sower.

Following the surrender of Japan, while his fellow POWs were repatriated, van der Post chose to remain in Java, and on 15 September 1945, he joined Admiral Wilfrid Patterson on HMS Cumberland for the official surrender of the Japanese in Java to British forces representing the Allies.

Van der Post then spent two years helping to mediate between Indonesian nationalists and members of the Dutch Colonial Government. He had gained the trust of the nationalist leaders such as Mohammad Hatta and Sukarno and warned both British Prime Minister Clement Attlee and the Allied Supreme Commander in South East Asia, Admiral Lord Louis Mountbatten, whom he met in London in October 1945, that the country was on the verge of blowing up. Van der Post travelled to The Hague to repeat his warning directly to the Dutch cabinet. In November 1946, British forces withdrew and van der Post became military attaché to the British consulate in Batavia. By 1947, after he had returned to England, the Indonesian Revolution had begun. That same year, van der Post retired from the army and was made a CBE. The events of these early post-war years in Java are examined in his memoir The Admiral's Baby (1996).

=== Post-war life ===
With the war over and his business with the army concluded, van der Post returned to South Africa in late 1947 to work at the Natal Daily News, but with the election of the National Party and the onset of apartheid he traveled back to London. He later published a critique of apartheid (The Dark Eye in Africa, 1955), basing many of his insights on his developing interest in psychology. In May 1949, he was commissioned by the Colonial Development Corporation (CDC) to "assess the livestock capacities of the uninhabited Nyika and Mulanje plateaux of Nyasaland" (now part of Malawi). Around this time he divorced Marjorie, and on 13 October 1949, married Ingaret Giffard.

He went on honeymoon with Ingaret to Switzerland, where his new wife introduced him to Carl Jung. Jung was to have probably a greater influence on him than anybody else, and he later said that he had never met anyone of Jung's stature. He continued to work on a travel book about his Nyasaland adventures called Venture to the Interior, which became an immediate best-seller in the US and Europe upon its publication in 1952.

In 1950, Lord Reith (head of the CDC) asked van der Post to head an expedition to Bechuanaland (now Botswana), to see the potential of the remote Kalahari Desert for cattle ranching. There van der Post for the first time met the hunter-gatherer people known as the Bushmen or San people. He repeated the journey to the Kalahari in 1952. In 1953, he published his third book, The Face Beside the Fire, a semi-autobiographical novel about a psychologically "lost" artist in search of his soul and soul-mate, which clearly shows Jung's influence on his thinking and writing.

Flamingo Feather (1955) was an anti-communist novel in the guise of a Buchanesque adventure story, about a Soviet plot to take over South Africa. It sold very well. Alfred Hitchcock planned to film the book, but lost support from South African authorities and gave up the idea. Penguin Books kept Flamingo Feather in print until the collapse of the Soviet Union.

In 1955, the BBC commissioned van der Post to return to the Kalahari in search of the Bushmen, a journey that became a six-part television documentary series in 1956. In 1958, his best-known book was published under the same title as the BBC series: The Lost World of the Kalahari. He followed this in 1961 by The Heart of the Hunter, derived from Specimens of Bushman Folklore (1910), collected by Wilhelm Bleek and Lucy Lloyd, and Mantis and His Hunter, collected by Dorothea Bleek.

Van der Post described the Bushmen as the original natives of southern Africa, outcast and persecuted by all other races and nationalities. He said they represented the "lost soul" of all mankind, a type of noble savage myth. This mythos of the Bushmen inspired the colonial government to create the Central Kalahari Game Reserve in 1961 to guarantee their survival, and the reserve became a part of settled law when Botswana was created in 1966.

=== Later years ===
Van der Post had become a respected television personality, had introduced the world to the Kalahari Bushmen, and was considered an authority on Bushman folklore and culture. "I was compelled towards the Bushmen," he said, "like someone who walks in his sleep, obedient to a dream of finding in the dark what the day has denied him." Over the next fifteen years, he had a steady stream of publications, including the two books drawn from his war experiences (see above), a travel book called A Journey into Russia (1964) describing a long trip through the Soviet Union, and two novels of adventure set on the fringes of the Kalahari desert, A Story Like the Wind (1972) and its sequel A Far-Off Place (1974). The latter books, about four young people, two of them San, caught up in violent events on the borders of 1970s Rhodesia, became popular as class readers in secondary schools. In 1972, there was a BBC television series about his 12-year friendship with Jung, who died in 1961, which was followed by the book Jung and the Story of Our Time (1976).

Ingaret and he moved to Aldeburgh, Suffolk, where they became involved with a circle of friends that included an introduction to then-Prince Charles, whom he then took on a safari to Kenya in 1977 and with whom he had a close and influential friendship for the rest of his life. Also in 1977, together with Ian Player, a South African conservationist, he created the first World Wilderness Congress in Johannesburg. In 1979, his Chelsea neighbor Margaret Thatcher became prime minister, and she called on his advice with matters dealing with southern Africa, particularly the Rhodesia settlement of 1979–80. In 1981, he was given a Knighthood. He was made godfather to Prince William. He was made godfather to Diana Dunlop, granddaughter of Colonel Sir Edward "Weary" Dunlop.

In 1982, he fell and injured his back and used the hiatus from tennis and skiing to write an autobiography called Yet Being Someone Other (1982), which discussed his love of the sea and his journey to Japan with Plomer in 1926. (His affection for that country and its people, despite his wartime experiences, had first been explored in 1968 in his book Portrait of Japan.) By now, Ingaret was slipping into senility, and he spent much time with the sculptor Frances Baruch, an old friend (who made a bust of van der Post). In 1984, his son John (who had gone on to be an engineer in London) died, and van der Post spent time with his youngest daughter Lucia and her family.

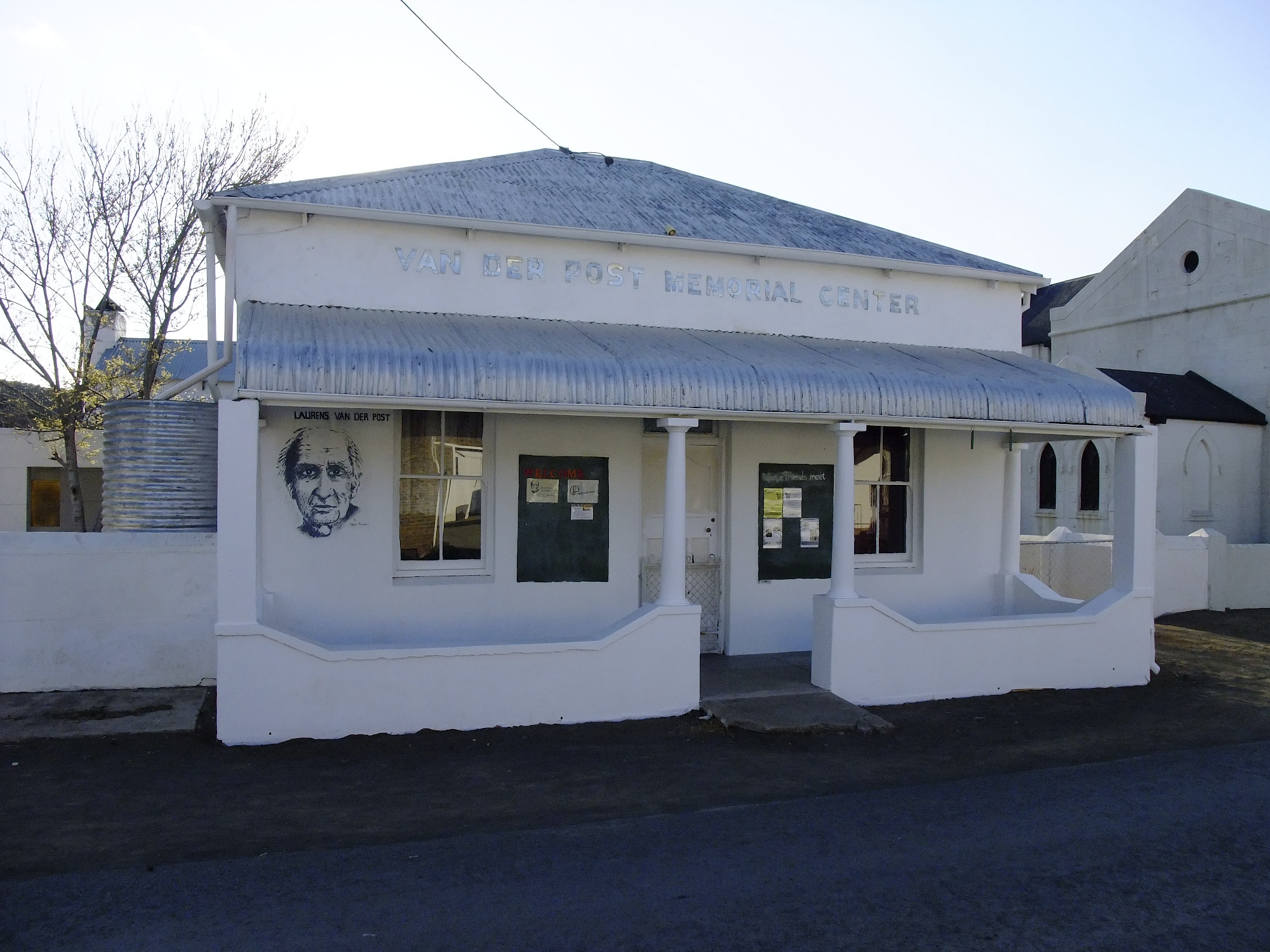
The Laurens van der Post Memorial Centre in Philippolis, South Africa

In old age, van der Post was involved with many projects, from the worldwide conservationist movement, to setting up a centre of Jungian studies in Cape Town. A Walk with a White Bushman (1986), the transcript of a series of interviews, gives a taste of his appeal as a conversationalist. In 1996, he tried to prevent the eviction of the Bushmen from their homeland in the Central Kalahari Game Reserve, which had been set up for that purpose, but ironically it was his work in the 1950s to promote the land for cattle ranching that led to their eventual removal. In October 1996, he published The Admiral's Baby, describing the events in Java at the end of the war. His 90th birthday celebration was spread over five days in Colorado, with a "this is your life"-type event with friends from every period of his life. A few days later, on 15 December 1996, after whispering in Afrikaans "die sterre" (the stars), he died. The funeral took place on 20 December in London, attended by Zulu chief Mangosuthu Buthelezi, Prince Charles, Margaret Thatcher, and many friends and family. His ashes were buried in a special memorial garden at Philippolis on 4 April 1998. Ingaret died five months after him on 5 May 1997.

Laurens van de Post Way, built on the former School of Service Intelligence site in Ashford, Kent, is named after him.

== Posthumous controversy ==
After van der Post's death a number of writers questioned the accuracy of his claims about his life. His reputation as a "modern sage" and "guru" was questioned, and journalists published examples of embellishment of the truth in his memoirs and travel books. J. D. F. Jones, in his authorised biography Storyteller: The Lives of Laurens van der Post (2001), claimed that van der Post was "a fraud, a fantasist, a liar, a serial adulterer and a paternalist. He falsified his Army record and inflated his own importance at every possible opportunity." A rebuttal was published by Christopher Booker (van der Post's ODNB biographer and friend) in The Spectator.

While conducting research for van der Post's biography with the permission of his daughter Lucia, Jones found documents confirming that van der Post in 1953 had fathered a daughter with a 14-year-old girl named Bonnie who had been entrusted to his care by her parents for a sea voyage between South Africa and England. Van der Post never acknowledged the existence of the child, nor his relationship to her, but did pay Bonnie a yearly stipend. The child, Cari Mostert, publicly came out to support Jones's biographical account in 1996, after Van Der Post's death.

== Selected works ==
For a complete list see external links.

- In a Province; novel (1934; reprinted 1953).
- Venture to the Interior; travel (1952).
- The Face Beside the Fire; novel (1953).
- A Bar of Shadow; novella (1954).
- Flamingo Feather; novel (1955).
- The Dark Eye in Africa; politics, psychology (1955).
- The Lost World of the Kalahari; travel (1958) [BBC 6-part TV series, 1956].
- The Heart of the Hunter; travel, folklore (1961).
- The Seed and the Sower; three novellas (1963).
- A Journey into Russia (US title: A View of All the Russias); travel (1964).
- A Portrait of Japan; travel (1968).
- The Night of the New Moon (US title: The Prisoner and the Bomb); wartime memoirs (1970).
- A Story Like the Wind; novel (1972).
- A Far-Off Place; novel, sequel to the above (1974).
- Jung and the Story of Our Time; psychology, memoir (1975).
- Yet Being Someone Other; memoir, travel (1982).
- A Walk with A White Bushman; interview-transcripts (1986).
- The Admiral's Baby; memoir (1996).

== Movies ==
Film adaptations of his books.

- Merry Christmas, Mr. Lawrence (1983)—based on The Seed and the Sower (1963) and The Night of the New Moon (1970), about his experience as a prisoner of war. It was directed by Nagisa Ōshima and starred David Bowie.
- A Far Off Place (1993)—based on A Far-Off Place (1974) and A Story Like the Wind (1972).
