= The Living Reed =

1963 novel by Pearl S. Buck

the Living Reed
- First edition
- Author: Pearl S. Buck
- Language: English
- Genre: Historical novel
- Publisher: John Day
- Publication date: 1963
- Publication place: United States
- Media type: Print (Hardback & Paperback)

The Living Reed is a historical novel by Pearl S. Buck. It describes life in Korea from the latter part of the nineteenth century to the end of the Second World War through the viewpoints and lives of several members of four generations of a prominent aristocratic family.
