= Hester Burton =

English children's writer (1913–2000)

- Born: Hester Wood-Hill; 6 December 1913; Beccles, Suffolk, England
- Died: 17 September 2000 (aged 86); Oxford, England
- Occupation: Writer
- Spouse: Reginald Burton (m. 1937)
- Children: 3
- Writing career
- Language: English
- Genre: Children's historical fiction
- Notable works: Time of Trial; Beyond the Weir Bridge aka Thomas; No Beat of Drum
- Notable awards: Carnegie Medal; 1963

Hester Burton (née Wood-Hill; 6 December 1913 – 17 September 2000) was an English writer, mainly of historical fiction for children and young adults. She received the Carnegie Medal for her 1963 novel Time of Trial, which like many of her books was illustrated by Victor Ambrus.

== Early life ==
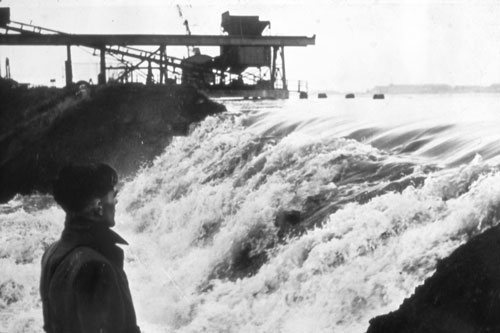
Flood waters at Erith, 1953, part of the North Sea flood which also killed 41 people in Suffolk and inspired Burton's novel The Great Gale.

She was born Hester Wood-Hill on 6 December 1913 in Beccles, Suffolk, where her father was elected town mayor three times. From 1925 to 1936, she attended Headington School, Oxford and then St Anne's College, Oxford, where she received an honours degree in English. In 1937, she married Reginald W. B. Burton, a Classics don at Oriel College. They had three daughters.

== Non-fiction ==
In 1949, Burton published a biography of Barbara Bodichon, the 19th-century feminist, artist and educationalist. She worked for Oxford University Press from 1956 to 1964, contributing two volumes to the Oxford Sheldonian English Series for secondary schoolchildren: Coleridge and the Wordsworths, 1953, and Tennyson in 1954. She worked as an assistant editor for the revised Oxford Junior Encyclopaedia, and edited two 1959 anthologies: A Book of Modern Stories and Her First Ball.

In addition, Burton edited works by friends and colleagues, including Thomas Hardy: Distracted Preacher? Hardy's Religious Biography and its Influence on his Novels by Timothy R. Hands and Mike Esbester.

== Fiction ==
Burton's first children's novel was The Great Gale, published 1960 and inspired by the devastation of the North Sea flood of 1953 on her home county of Suffolk. Her subject matter often reflects a radical approach popularised by Geoffrey Trease. It includes the slave trade in To Ravensrigg and the Captain Swing riots of the 1830s in No Beat of Drum and Otmoor for Ever. She sometimes covered similar themes for different age groups; Beyond the Weir Bridge is for teens, while the same issues and events appear for six to nine-year-olds in Through the Fire. Several are set in Suffolk, many having a maritime or naval setting.

Rather than balancing divergent views, Burton presented her stories from the angles of individuals or groups, which she saw as more authentic. In a 1973 interview, she explained, "I am not all-wise or all-knowing... but neither were the people actually taking part.... It is a wise precaution for a writer of historical fiction to limit this range of vision... [and] also much better art."

Many of her books, such as No Beat of Drum and A Time of Trial, reflect the impact of social inequalities on her protagonists, their willingness to challenge them, and the value they placed on education as a promoter of change. Her biography of the Victorian feminist Barbara Bodichon shows her abiding interest in women's issues; her novels have strong, independent heroines, and many of Ambrus's cover illustrations emphasise female character.

The Oxford Encyclopedia of Children's Literature summarises her novels as "featuring heroines with strong opinions; class tensions and social justice are recurring themes. Her writing is unsentimental... and her books accounts of ordinary young people affected by national events."

In a letter of February 2006, one of Burton's daughters wrote, "I could always tell when Mum had another book on her mind, she would start to cook the meal while still wearing her overcoat and hat."

== Death ==
Hester Burton died on 17 September 2000 in Oxford, after a stroke suffered at the age of 86.

== Bibliography ==
=== Fiction for older readers ===
- The Great Gale (1960), also titled The Flood at Reedsmere; the North Sea flood of 1953;
- Castors Away! (1962) on the Napoleonic Wars
- Time of Trial (1963) on free speech in the early 19th century
- A Seaman at the Time of Trafalgar (1963) on the Napoleonic Wars at sea
- No Beat of Drum (1966) on social unrest in 1830 and transportation to Van Diemen's Land, modern Tasmania;
- In Spite of All Terror (1968) on the beginning of the Second World War, Dunkirk and evacuation
- Thomas (1969, in the US as Beyond the Weir Bridge) on the English Civil War and after
- The Henchmans at Home (1970), also titled The Day That Went Terribly Wrong: And Other Stories; family life in Victorian Suffolk;
- The Rebel (1971) on Revolutionary France
- Riders of the Storm (1972) on education and unrest in 18th-century England
- Kate Rider (1974) on the English Civil War: the Siege of Colchester
- To Ravensrigg (1976) on the Liverpool slave trade;
- A Grenville Goes to Sea (1977) on Nelson's navy
- When the Beacons Blazed (1978) on the Spanish Armada
- Five August Days (1981), a contemporary adventure;

=== Fiction for younger readers ===
These were published as part of the Antelope Series, intended for readers of six-nine years.

- Otmoor for Ever (1968); Jake and his brother Seth resist as the common land of Otmoor is enclosed by the local land-owners using fences and hedges.
- Through the Fire (1969); covers many of the themes of Thomas including the persecution of the Quakers under the Restoration. Rachel and Will ride into London with their father to take food to their imprisoned friends but are trapped when the Great Fire of London breaks out.
- Tim at the Fur Fort (1977); in early 19th century Canada, Tim works as an accountant for the Hudson's Bay Company in what is now British Columbia but wants to be an explorer. When disease strikes Fort Frederick, he has to prove himself by making the most dangerous journey of his life.

=== Non-fiction ===
- Barbara Bodichon (1949), a short biography of the 19th century feminist, artist and educationalist Barbara Bodichon
- Coleridge and the Wordsworths (1953); Oxford Sheldonian English Series;
- Tennyson (1954); Oxford Sheldonian English Series;
