= Bhalchandra Nemade =

Indian writer

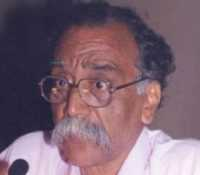
- Born: 27 May 1938 (age 88); Sangavi, Yawal, Maharashtra, India
- Education: Fergusson College; University of Bombay; SOAS, London
- Occupation: Marathi writer
- Writing career
- Notable work: Kosala (1963)
- Notable awards: Sahitya Akademi Award (1991); Padma Shri (2013); Jnanapith Award (2014)

Bhalchandra Vanaji Nemade (born 27 May 1938) is an Indian Marathi language writer, poet, critic and linguistic scholar. Beginning with his debut novel Kosala, Nemade brought new dimensions to the world of Marathi literature. This was followed by a tetralogy consisting of novels Bidhar, Hool, Jareela and Jhool. In 2013, Nemade published his magnum opus titled Hindu: Jagnyachi Samruddha Adgal (Marathi: हिंदू: जगण्याची समृद्ध अडगळ) which is regarded as his masterpiece. Nemade is a recipient of the Sahitya Akademi Award as well as the Jnanapith Award, the highest literary honour in India. In 2013, he was awarded the Padma Shri.

== Life ==
Bhalchandra Nemade was born on 27 May 1938 in the village of Sangavi in the Khandesh region of Maharashtra. After doing his matriculation, he moved to Pune, and received his BA from Fergusson College in Pune and MA in Linguistics from Deccan College in Pune and English Literature from the Mumbai University in Mumbai. He received PhD and D.Lit. degrees from North Maharashtra University.

Nemade worked as a college teacher in several parts of Maharashtra. He spent a year in London teaching Marathi at the School of Oriental and African Studies. From 1973 to 1986, he taught English at Marathwada University in Aurangabad. In 1987, he was appointed as professor and head of department of English at Goa University. In 1991, he joined Mumbai University, from where he retired as the Gurudeo Tagore Chair for comparative literature studies. During 1960s, Nemade edited Marathi magazine Vacha.

== Literary career ==
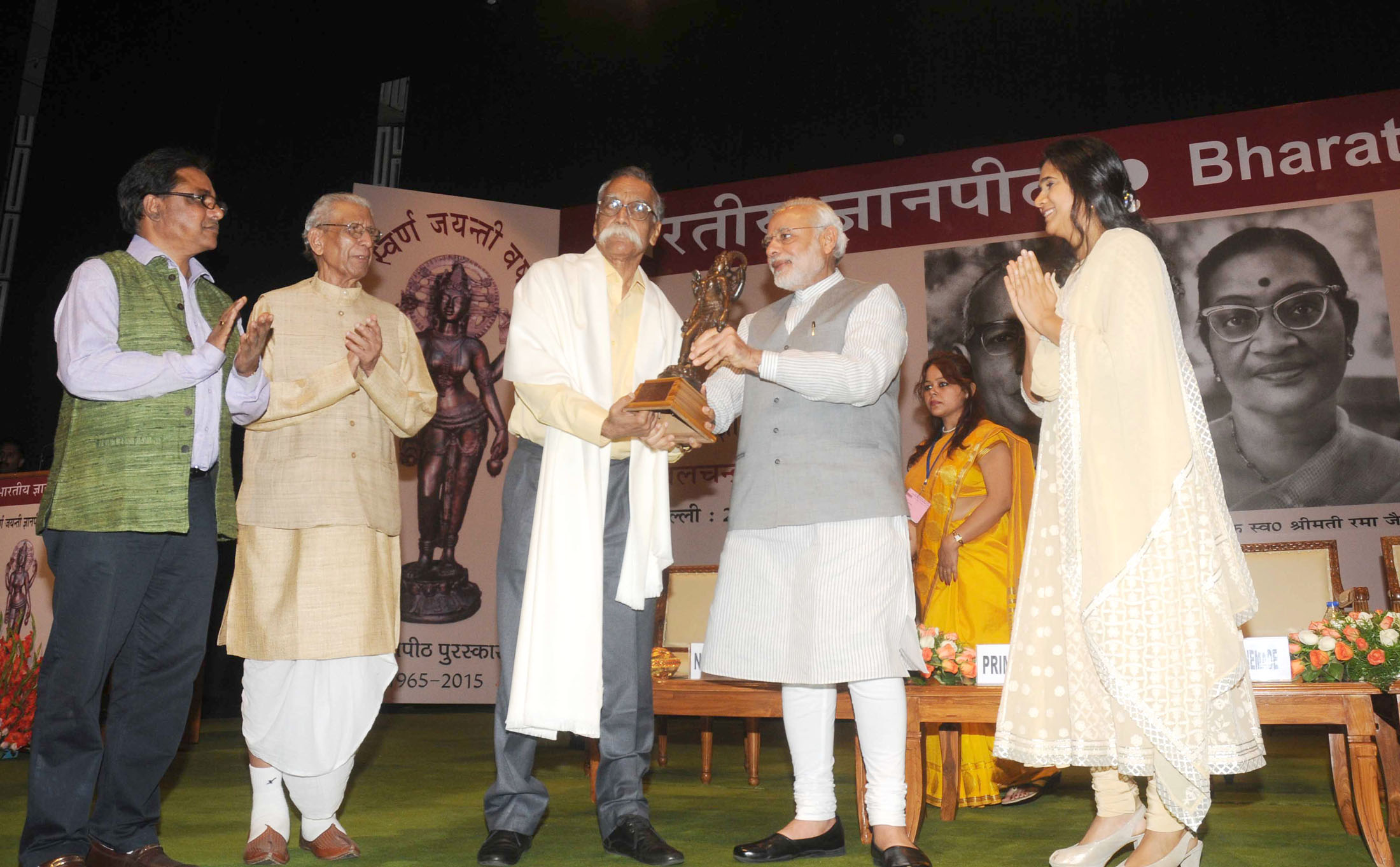
The prime minister Narendra Modi presenting the 50th Jnanpith Award to Bhalchandra Nemade on 25 April 2015

Nemade wrote his first novel Kosala (Marathi: कोसला) in 1963. It is a fictitious autobiographical novel of one Pandurang Sangvikar, a youth from rural Maharashtra who studies in a college in Pune; but it is loosely based on Nemade's own life in his youth.

Sangvikar, the narrator in Kosala, uses everyday Marathi spoken in rural Maharashtra and his worldview also reflects that held by residents of rural Maharashtra. Kosala is a chronological autobiographical narration, yet it employs certain innovative techniques. Thus, Sangvikar describes one year in his life in the form of a witty diary. As another innovative technique, the narration describes "historical investigations" often undertaken by Sangvikar and his friend Suresh Bapat, which ultimately uncover to them the absurdity and tragedy of their present condition. Kosla is extensively translated into various languages including English, Hindi, Gujarati, Kannada, Assamese, Punjabi, Bengali, Urdu, Oriya, et al.

After Kosala, Nemade presented a different protagonist, Changadev Patil, through his four novels Bidhar (Marathi: बिढार), Hool (Marathi: हूल), Jarila (Marathi: जरीला) and Jhool (Marathi: झूल). Another tetralogy begins with Hindu – Jagnyachi Samruddha Adgal (Marathi: हिंदू – जगण्याची समृद्ध अडगळ) in 2010 having Khanderao, the archaeologist as its protagonist.

The differences between Sangvikar and Patil are not confined to just their age, profession, habits, and intellectual and emotional perception: While Sangvikar at times keeps the world at bay or even rejects the world, Patil is all for the world and is forever engaged in confronting and understanding it. Sangvikar is mercurial, Patil is more realistic, whereas Khanderao's consciousness moves across 5000 years to Indus Valley culture in the Hindu tetralogy.

As a critic, Nemade's contribution rests in initiating Deshivad, a theory that negates globalisation or internationalism, asserting the value of writers' native heritage, indicating that Marathi literature ought to try to revive its native base and explore its indigenous sources. Nemade antagonised his contemporaries by contending that the short story is a genre inferior to that of the novel.

Nemade won the prestigious Jnanpith Award in February 2015. He was the fourth laureate receiving the award for work in Marathi language.

Winner of the Sahitya Akademi Award, he was conferred with Padma Shri in 2011 by Government of India.

== Bibliography ==
Novels

- Hindu – Jagnyachi Samruddha Adgal (Marathi: हिंदू – जगण्याची समृद्ध अडगळ), published by Popular Prakashan, Mumbai
- Kosala (Marathi: कोसला), Popular Prakashan, Mumbai
- Bidhar (Marathi: बिढार), Popular Prakashan, Mumbai
- Hool (Marathi: हूल), Popular Prakashan, Mumbai
- Jarila (Marathi: जरीला), Popular Prakashan, Mumbai
- Jhool (Marathi: झूल), Popular Prakashan, Mumbai

Poetry collections

- Melody (Marathi: मेलडी), Vacha Prakashan, Aurangabad
- Dekhani (Marathi: देखणी), Popular Prakashan, Mumbai

Criticism

- Teekaswayamvar, Saket Prakashan, Aurangabad
- Sahityachi Bhasha, Saket Prakashan, Aurangabad
- Tukaram, Sahitya Akademi, New Delhi
- The Influence of English on Marathi : A Sociolinguistic and Stylistic Study, Rajahauns Prakashan, Panaji
- Indo-Anglian Writings: Two Lectures, Prasaranga Prakashan, Mysore
- Marathi For Beginners, Saket Prakashan, Aurangabad
- Marathi Reading Course (with Ian Raeside), S.O.A.S., Univ. of London.
- Nivadak Mulakhati, Loka Wangmaya Griha, Mumbai.
- Sola Bhashane, Loka Wangmaya Griha, Mumbai.
- Nativism (Desivad), Indian Institute of Advanced Study, Shimla
- How Much Space Does an Indian Writer Need?:Literary Standards-Native, Western, Global, Sahitya Academi, New Delhi

== See also ==
- List of Indian writers
