= Kosala (novel) =

1963 Marathi novel by Bhalchandra Nemade

- Cover of English translation
- Author: Bhalchandra Nemade
- Original title: कोसला
- Translator: Sudhakar Marathe
- Language: Marathi
- Subject: Existentialism, alienation
- Set in: 1950s Khandesh (Central India) and Pune
- Publisher: Deshmukh and Company
- Publication date: September 1963
- Publication place: India
- English publication date: 1997
- OCLC: 38258018

Kosala (English: Cocoon), sometimes spelled Kosla, is a Marathi novel by Indian writer Bhalchandra Nemade, published in 1963. Regarded as Nemade's Masterpiece, and accepted as a modern classic of Marathi literature, the novel uses the autobiographical form to narrate the journey of a young man, Pandurang Sangvikar, and his friends through his college years.

Kosala is considered to be the first existentialist novel in Marathi literature. Since its publication, its open-ended nature and potential for varied interpretations have been viewed as ground-breaking. The novel has become a modern classic of post-1960 Marathi fiction, and has been translated into eight South India languages and into English.

== Publication ==
Kosala, Bhalchandra Nemade's debut novel, was conceived and written during his Mumbai phase.

At 21, Nemade had failed in his journalistic aspirations, and returned to his native village. He was rebuffed there by his father, who was disappointed that his son risked squandering an expensive education to end up being a cowherd.

In 1963, Nemade was 25 and living in his village. Likening himself to the Hindu king Trishanku, accepted neither by the city nor his village family, a despairing Nemade shut himself away and wrote his novel over a three-week period. Kosala was published in September that same year by J. J. Deshmukh, who had learned of Nemade's talent and encouraged him to write during his sojourn in Mumbai.

The novel proved innovative, and quickly became a success. As a Bildungsroman, tracing the author's own story from childhood until his return to his village, it broke with Marathi narrative traditions. Several editions appeared in the years following the novel's initial publication. The twenty-second edition of Kosala was published in 2013.

== Contents ==
Kosala uses the first-person narrative technique to recount the first twenty-five years in the life of Pandurang Sangavikar, a young man of rural upbringing who moves to Pune for his higher education. He feels isolated in his new social setting, and this persistent feeling of estrangement leads him to return home. There, he encounters further disillusionment, with the death of his sister, his father's domination, and his own financial dependence. The novel aims to portray the spectrum of society from the viewpoint of Pandurang as a young boy.

== Characters ==
Main characters:

- Pandurang Sangavikar – The protagonist, and only son of a rich village farmer. His fellow hostel students call him by his nickname, Pandu.
- Pandurang's father – The head of a joint family, and a rich and respected man in his village.
- Mani – Pandurang's younger sister.
- Giridhar – Pandurang's village friend.
- Suresh Bapat – Pandurang's college friend in Pune.

== Plot ==
The story unfolds during the 1950s in Khandesh (a region in Central India), and in Pune. Using the autobiographical form, Kosala narrates the life-story of Pandurang Sangvikar, a young man of 25, in six sections.

Pandurang is the son of a well-to-do farmer from Sangvi, a village in Khandesh. His family includes his parents, his grandmother, and his four sisters. Pandurang's relationship with his father is a difficult one, and they have been estranged since Pandurang was a boy. His father, who typifies the patriarchal family head, beats his son in childhood for wandering around in the company of his friends. He does not allow the young boy to learn to play the flute, or to perform in his school's plays. Pandurang considers his father excessively money-minded, materialistic, selfish, unscrupulous, and dictatorial. In sharp contrast to his relationship with his father, Pandurang loves his mother and his sisters dearly.

After passing his local school's matriculation examination, Pandurang moves to Pune to attend college. While studying, Pandurang lives in a hostel. He decides to make the most of college life, and becomes the secretary of the college debating society, prefect of the hostel, and directs a play at the college Annual Day function. Out of kindness, he gives responsibility for the management of the hostel mess to one of his poor friends. But, although Pandurang tries to help everyone around him, he ultimately discovers that his friends are using him. Finally, when he fails his exams badly and his financial position deteriorates, his father becomes angered by Pandurang's lifestyle. Pandurang learns a lesson: that good deeds do not count for much in life.

In his second year of college, Pandurang is an entirely new man, carefree and adventurous. Even his father now hesitates to ask him to mend his ways. He is shaken by the untimely death of his younger sister, Mani, but otherwise has no care for anything. In consequence, he fails his exam. After unsuccessful attempts to find work in the city, ultimately Pandurang returns to his village, his mind "existentially vacant". He is now one of many unemployed youngsters of the village. As Pandurang tries to understand their views on life, their sorrows and their joys, the true meaning of life begins to dawn.

== Theme and techniques ==
The main theme of Kosala is alienation. The novel is influenced by existential philosophy, exploring existentialist ideas such as an obsession with birth and death, dread, alienation, and absurdity. Like other existential novels, Kosala uses the first person point of view to recount an individual's experiences, and in this exploration raises many questions regarding the meaning of life and the value of existence. It is considered the first existential novel in Marathi literature.

The novel's protagonist, Pandurang, has been described as a "quintessential anti-hero", refusing all forms of colonial modernity: literacy, Western education, Urbanization, industrialisation, capitalism, nationalism, and the values of "progress" they embody.

Pandurang is estranged from his father, and has been from childhood. Later in the novel, this estrangement develops into a major theme of the younger generation's mute revolt against the patriarchal value system characteristic of traditional Indian life. Pandurang has not found anything meaningful in his experience of village life. Over a six-year period, this experience of meaninglessness repeats itself in his college life in Pune.

Despite the novel's pessimistic undertones, an element of humour runs through Kosala. Oblique, irrelevant humour is used as a serious moral strategy, to unmask the falseness of society and culture.

In its narrative, Kosala presents a fusion of different genres, including: autobiography, the diary, the novel, Indian folktales, folk narrative, and medieval hagiography. The novel makes varied use of language, style and register, including: standard and archaic language, urban and non-urban dialect, slang, jargon, poetry, and rhetoric. Kosala is said to have been inspired in part by J. D. Salinger's The Catcher in the Rye, a novel to which it has a similar narrative style.

== Reception ==
Kosala is widely regarded as both a modern classic and a ground-breaking novel which left its mark on sathottari, or post-1960, Marathi fiction. Nemade rapidly came to be considered a representative writer of his generation with its publication.

According to Nemade himself, Kosala was given a hostile reception by the Marathi establishment, both for its portrayal of the professorial class, and for its description of the profane world. But it gained an enthusiastic following among readers of the younger generation, who identified with the thinking exemplified by its protagonist. The novel heralded a new trend in Marathi literature, and other commentators hold that it received immediate critical acclaim.

Since its publication, Kosala has been considered a trendsetter in Marathi literature, because of its open-ended quality and its potential for varied interpretation. It is the novel most widely appreciated and interpreted by a number of literary critics, including: Dilip Chitre, Narhar Kurundkar, Chandrashekhar Jahagirdar, Vilas Sarang, Sukanya Aagase, Rekha Inamdar-Sane, and Vasudev Sawant. Chandrashekhar Jahagirdar wrote: "It was only Kosla [sic], which responding as it did to a crisis in the cultural consciousness of Maharashtra, that opened up new, native possibilities of form and meaning and thus sought to change the direction of both literary taste and fictional tradition".

Kosala has been adapted into a play, Me, Pandurang Sangavikar (lit. I am Pandurang Sangavikar), directed by Mandar Deshpande.

== Translations ==
Kosala has been translated into eight Indian languages, and into English. The available translations of the novel are as follows:

Title	Language	Translator	Year	Publisher	Ref.
Cocoon	English	Sudhakar Marathe	1997	Macmillan Publishers India, Chennai	
Kosala	Hindi	Bhagwandas Verma	1992	National Book Trust, New Delhi	
Kosheto	Gujarati	Usha Sheth	1995	National Book Trust, New Delhi	
Kosala	Kannada	Vaman Dattatraya Bendre	1995	National Book Trust, New Delhi	
Palur Vaah	Assamese	Kishorimohan Sharma	1996	National Book Trust, New Delhi	
Kosala	Punjabi	Ajeet Singh	1996	National Book Trust, New Delhi	
Need	Bengali	Vandana Alase Hazra	2001	Sahitya Akademi, New Delhi	
Kosala	Urdu	Musharraf Alam Jauki	2002	National Book Trust, New Delhi	
Koshapok	Odia	Cheershree Indrasingh	2005	National Book Trust, New Delhi	
