= Jiangsu People's Press =

State-owned publisher in China

- Type: State-owned enterprise
- Industry: Publishing
- Founded: 1953
- Headquarters: 1 Hunan Road, Nanjing, Jiangsu
- Website: www.jspph.com at the Wayback Machine (archived 23 February 2020)

Jiangsu People's Press (Chinese: 江苏人民出版社) is a publishing house in Jiangsu, China. It was established in 1953 in Nanjing. The publisher issues books on political theory and culture as well as children's literature.

Jiangsu People's Press was founded in January 1953 from the merger of the Sunan People's Publishing House (Chinese: 将苏南人民出版社), which was founded in Wuxi in 1950, and Subei People's Publishing House (Chinese: 苏北人民出版社), which was founded in Yangzhou in 1951.
