= Naked Came I =

1963 novel by David Weiss

- First US edition (publ. William Morrow)
- Author: David Weiss
- Language: English
- Genre: Biographical novel
- Published: 1963
- Publication place: United States
- Media type: Print
- Pages: 660
- ISBN: 0340178221

Naked Came I is a bestselling 1963 novel by David Weiss based on the life of sculptor Auguste Rodin.

Naked Came I portrays Rodin as driven to be an artist because his temperament would allow him to be nothing else. It shows him as a friend with other Parisian artists such as Edgar Degas, Auguste Renoir, Édouard Manet, and those of the Second French Empire associated with the Salon des Refusés: they were generally outside the Paris art establishment, and had been refused admission to the École des Beaux Arts. The title is derived, according to the frontispiece, from Cervantes' Don Quixote. (Cervantes, in turn, had taken it from the Book of Job, 1:21.)

Due to the success of Weiss' previous novels, the book was, almost simultaneously with its American publication, also published in the United Kingdom and in translation in France, Germany, and Italy.

In popular culture, Naked Came I was the title of the sensationalized memoir of Opus the Penguin in the Berke Breathed comic strip, Bloom County.
