= David Weiss (novelist) =

American novelist

David Weiss (1909 – November 29, 2002) was an American novelist and writer best known for his bestselling 1963 biographical novel Naked Came I about the life of sculptor Auguste Rodin.

== Biography ==
Born in 1909, from an early age Weiss showed an interest in the lives of artists and composers. His father was a painter, and after Weiss was orphaned at the age of four he was raised in Philadelphia by an aunt who owned a Russian restaurant across the street from the Academy of Music.

In 1933 he graduated from Temple University and moved to New York, where he became private secretary to Erwin Piscator, then head of the Dramatic Workshop at the New School for Social Research; whilst there Weiss did graduate work in dramatics and became an assistant director during the early days of the Actors Studio.

Following an unsuccessful career as an actor Weiss worked at more than 50 jobs before turning to writing. As Weiss himself remarked: ‘It is a cliché today for a writer to have had many jobs in search of experience and I have stretched this cliché to breaking point.' Among the many jobs he held were stevedore, plumber's help, lifeguard, meat loader and swimming coach. He also spent seven years as Eastern Story Editor for movie producer David O. Selznick, during which time he worked on the films A Farewell to Arms and Tender is the Night.

David Weiss was married to the poet, artist and Group Theatre playwright Stymean Karlen for 53 years, until her death in 1998. Karlen often contributed poetry to Weiss's novels, and the couple lived in New York, London and La Jolla, California. After her death Weiss wrote a biography of his wife, Forever and After.

David Weiss died on November 29, 2002, at a La Jolla Hospital. The cause was thrombophlebitis and complications from a fall. He was 93.

== Writing ==
In 1953 Weiss published his first novel, The Guilt Makers, which won the $5,000 Frieder Literary Award for best novel on a Jewish theme published in America. This was followed in 1959 by The Spirit and the Flesh (inspired by the life of the dancer Isadora Duncan) and his most successful book Naked Came I in 1963.

Although he wrote plays and a couple of contemporary set novels, Weiss's speciality was biographical fiction – particularly of artists, such as Titian and Rembrandt. He wrote two novels about Wolfgang Amadeus Mozart: Sacred and Profane (1968) described by Yehudi Menuhin as ‘a very readable book which portrays the human being behind the music, increasing our love of both' and The Assassination of Mozart (1970) a fictitious examination of the mysteries surrounding the composer’s death.

The following are a selection of the critical plaudits Weiss received during his career:

‘There is a rich, tapestried quality to The Venetian. It is not only an absorbing story but an intelligent book showing Mr Weiss again to be one of the best practitioners of the biographical novel, especially perceptive in the study of artists.’ – Edmund Fuller, The Wall Street Journal

‘If all history were written as David Weiss wrote Myself, Christopher Wren, you would have to stand in line to sign up for history courses throughout the world.’ – Tom Ferris, The Miami Herald

The Spirit and the Flesh ‘is a monumental work in which the author’s stupendous capacity for biographical research is surpassed only by his brilliance as a novelist with a fine sense of the dramatic.’ – King Features

Sacred and Profane: ‘I have read a number of biographies of Mozart, but I have never been so caught up in the essential tragedy of his life, nor so moved by the frustrating and heartbreaking circumstances of his day to day struggles.’ – Sheldon Harnick

== Bibliography ==
- The Guilt Makers (1953)
- The Spirit and The Flesh (1959) inspired by the life of Isadora Duncan
- Naked Came I (1963) based on the life of Auguste Rodin
- Justin Moyan (1965) inspired by the career of Marlon Brando
- Sacred and Profane (1968) based on the life of Wolfgang Amadeus Mozart
- The Assassination of Mozart (1970) a fictional investigation into Mozart's death
- No Number Is Greater Than One (1972) inspired by the Watergate scandal
- Myself, Christopher Wren (1973) based on the life of Christopher Wren
- Physician Extraordinary (1975) based on the life of William Harvey
- The Venetian (1976) based on the life of Titian
- I, Rembrandt (1979) based on the life of Rembrandt
