= Gerda Charles =

Anglo-Jewish novelist and author, Edna Lipson (1915-1996)

Gerda Charles was the pseudonym of Edna Lipson (10 March 1915 – 4 November 1996), an award-winning Anglo-Jewish novelist and author. She was born in Liverpool and was daughter of Harold Lipson and Gertrude Caplan who had married in Ormskirk in 1914. At some point her parents' marriage ended as by 1939 Gertrude Lipson was classified as divorced in the electoral records. For some years in the 1930s Edna and her mother ran a commercial hotel at 81 Mount Pleasant, Liverpool. After the war they both moved to London and Edna began attending evening classes in literature and writing at Morley College.

She published her first novel, The True Voice in 1959. A Slanting Light, her third novel, won the James Tait Black Memorial Prize in 1963. She met further success with the publication of The Destiny Waltz which won the inaugural Whitbread Novel of the Year award in 1971. Lipson worked as a journalist and reviewer for various newspapers such as the New Statesman, Daily Telegraph, New York Times and Jewish Chronicle. She also edited an anthology of modern Jewish short stories.

Edna Lipson never married and lived with her mother until the latter's death in 1981. Lipson died on 4 November 1996.

She is regarded as one of the chroniclers of the Anglo-Jewish experience, alongside writers such as Emanuel Litvinoff, Bernice Rubens, Bernard Kops and Arnold Wesker. Her posthumous papers reside in a collection at the University of Reading library. The collection consists of miscellaneous literary papers, with periodicals, press cuttings and personal correspondence. Tel Aviv University also inaugurated an award called the Gerda Charles Award.

== Works ==
=== Novels ===
- The True Voice (1959)
- The Crossing Point (1961)
- A Slanting Light (1963)
- A Logical Girl (1966)
- The Destiny Waltz (1971)

=== Anthologies edited ===
- Modern Jewish Stories (1963)
- Great Short Stories of the World (1976)

== Awards ==
- James Tait Black Memorial Prize (1963) - A Slanting Light
- Whitbread Prize, Best Novel (1971) - The Destiny Waltz
