= Flambards in Summer =

1969 children's novel by K. M. Peyton

- Front cover of first edition
- Author: K. M. Peyton
- Illustrator: Victor Ambrus
- Cover artist: Victor Ambrus
- Language: English
- Series: Flambards
- Genre: Children's novel
- Publisher: OUP
- Publication date: October 1969
- Publication place: United Kingdom
- Media type: Print (hardcover & paperback)
- Pages: 165 pp (first edition)
- ISBN: 0-19-271312-4
- OCLC: 135189
- LC Class: PZ7.P4483 Fm
- Preceded by: The Edge of the Cloud
- Followed by: Flambards Divided

Flambards in Summer is a novel for children or young adults by K. M. Peyton, first published by Oxford in 1969 with illustrations by Victor Ambrus. It completed the Flambards trilogy (1967–1969) although Peyton continued the story a dozen years later, and controversially reversed the ending in Flambards Divided. Set in England just after World War I, Flambards in Summer features Christina Parsons as a young widow, returning to the decrepit Flambards estate to recover a life there.

== Plot summary ==
The final novel in the original Flambards trilogy opens in the middle of the First World War with Christina, now a widow, returning to Flambards; an estate in Essex. Flambards has greatly deteriorated since she left with Will, and is almost in ruins. As distraction from her grief over Will's death and the news that his brother Mark has been reported missing and presumed dead, Christina sets herself the tedious and difficult task of restoring the farm. She not only wishes to restore the house and grounds but also a semblance of her old life, the people, horses and hounds.

Finding she is pregnant with Will's baby, Christina adopts Mark and Violet's six-year-old son 'Tizzy' Thomas, along with an original Flambards bitch called Marigold and a nervy five-year-old bay thoroughbred called Pheasant. Eventually she persuades Dick to come back to work on the farm and things slowly begin to go smoothly, until the reappearance of Mark. Christina's joy quickly turns to anxiety and apprehension as Mark tells her that if she wishes to remain at Flambards, she must marry him. But Christina fears Mark will become like his father, and when she finds she has feelings for Dick, her confusion increases as she still loves Will.

== Publication history ==
World Publishing Company of New York issued the first U.S. edition in 1970, retaining the Ambrus illustrations.

== Awards ==
Peyton and Flambards in Summer were commended for the annual Carnegie Medal from the Library Association, recognising the year's best children's book by a British subject. She won that year's award for the second book, The Edge of the Cloud.

For the trilogy Peyton won the 1970 Guardian Children's Fiction Prize, selected by a panel of British children's writers, a once-in-a-lifetime award that ordinarily recognises one fiction book published during the preceding calendar year. Exceptionally the 1970 award recognised the series completed in 1969.

== Adaptions ==
The trilogy was adapted as a 13-part television series in 1979, Flambards starring Christine McKenna as Christina Parsons. Peyton then continued and partly reversed the story.

== See also ==
- Historical fiction
