= The Edge of the Cloud =

1969 children's historical novel by K. M. Peyton

- Front cover of first edition
- Author: K. M. Peyton
- Illustrator: Victor Ambrus
- Cover artist: Victor Ambrus
- Language: English
- Series: Flambards
- Genre: Children's realistic novel, historical novel
- Publisher: Oxford University Press
- Publication date: January 1969
- Publication place: United Kingdom
- Media type: Print (hardcover & paperback)
- Pages: 166 pp (first edition)
- OCLC: 477505761
- LC Class: PZ7.P4483 Ed
- Preceded by: Flambards
- Followed by: Flambards in Summer

The Edge of the Cloud is a 1969 historical novel written for children or young adults by K. M. Peyton. It was the second book in Peyton's original Flambards trilogy, comprising three books published by Oxford with illustrations by Victor Ambrus (1967 to 1969), a series the author extended more than a decade later. Set in England prior to the First World War, it continues the romance of Christina Parsons and Will Russell. The title alludes to Will's participation in early aviation.

Peyton won the annual Carnegie Medal from the Library Association, recognising the year's best children's book by a British subject. She also won the 1970 Guardian Children's Fiction Prize, selected by a panel of British children's writers, a once-in-a-lifetime award that ordinarily recognises one fiction book published during the preceding calendar year. Exceptionally the 1970 award recognised the series completed in 1969.

World Publishing Company of New York issued the first U.S. edition in 1969, retaining the Ambrus illustrations.

The trilogy was adapted as a 13-part television series in 1979, Flambards starring Christine McKenna as Christina Parsons. Peyton then continued and partly reversed the story.

== Plot summary ==
The Edge of the Cloud is set in London where, after Will and Christina elope, Christina briefly stays with their Aunt Grace. Will finds a job as a mechanic and later as an instructor at a flying school, and Christina finds employment at a nearby hotel to be close to Will. Uncle Russel and Mr Dermont both die during the course of the story. One death fills Will with pain; the other indifference. Will and Christina become close friends with Sandy, another flying instructor, and his girlfriend, Dorothy, the spoiled daughter of Christina's employer. Will gives exhibition flights to make extra money and designs and builds his own aeroplane. Mark joins the army. At the end, Will becomes famous as a stunt pilot and is thinking of joining the army, which—on the eve of their long-awaited wedding—worries Christina.

== See also ==
Awards
Preceded by The Moon in the Cloud	Carnegie Medal recipient 1969	Succeeded by The God Beneath the Sea
