= Alan Parnaby (actor) =

British television and film actor

Alan Parnaby is a British television and film actor whose career has spanned four decades and who perhaps is best known for playing William Russell in the period drama Flambards (1979).

== Career ==
=== Television ===
In 1979, Parnaby appeared in the period miniseries Flambards (1979) as William Russell. The show was based on the trilogy written by British author K. M. Peyton. He starred with actress Christine Mckenna. Parnaby's other television roles include Jackanory Playhouse (1979), Tim in the episode 'Mary's Wife' in the series BBC2 Playhouse (1980), Wilfrid Corder in Hannah (1980), Mr Flax in Pinkerton's Progress (1983), Johnnie Purvis in Juliet Bravo (1984), Defence lawyer in Them and Us (1985). In 1985, Parnaby was cast as Mr Augustus Snodgrass in BBC's Charles Dickens seriesThe Pickwick Papers (1985).

Throughout the 1990s and 2000s, Parnaby continued acting in television. DC Price in The Chief (1991), Satoh in A Diplomat in Japan (1992), Paul Beaty/Peter Graley in The Bill (1994-1996), First Soldier in David (1997), Prison Governor in NCS: Manhunt (2002), Colin Draper in Heartbeat (2002), Geoff Hoon in Justifying War: Scenes from the Hutton Enquiry (2004), Mr. Boykin/Ricky Carson in Casualty (1986-2004), Nick Bell/PC Terry Sanders in Doctors (2001-2005), Businessman in Spooks (2005), Steve Shaw in Two Pints of Lager and a Packet of Crisps (2006), Mike in Jane Hall (2006), Soco in Hunter (2009), and Chris Huhne in On Expenses (2010).

=== Film ===
Parnaby's minor film roles include the Boatman in Dead Man's Folly (1986) and Policeman in Clockwise (1986).

=== Theatre ===
Theatre appearances include Guantanamo: Honour Bound to Defend Freedom (2004), Four Nights in Knaresborough (1999) and The Riots (2011) at the Tricycle Theatre; Factory Birds (West Yorkshire Playhouse); Scraps (Orange Tree Theatre); Ten Times Table and King Lear (Derby Playhouse); Black Blood and Gold, Love on the Dole, The Corn Is Green (Royal Exchange)(1981), Doctor Faustus (1981), Lord Arthur Savile's Crime, The Merchant of Venice (Royal Exchange); One Flew over the Cuckoo's Nest (Playhouse Theatre tour); and Frankenstein and Dracula (New Vic Theatre).

== Filmography ==
- Dead Man's Folly (1986, TV Movie) - The Boatman (uncredited)
- Clockwise (1986) - Policeman at Telephone Box
