= I. C. B. Dear =

British naval historian

I. C. B. Dear (Ian Dear) is a full-time writer specializing in maritime and military history, and between 1996 and 2004 was a reviewer for 'Contemporary British History'. He formerly served in the Royal Marines, and later worked in the film and book publishing industries. His most recent book, 'The Tattie Lads', was nominated for the Mountbatten Literary Award in 2016 and he is the author/editor/contributor of over 30 books including six novels, three under the pen name Ian Blake.

== Works ==
- The Oxford English: A Guide to the Language (compiler, 1986)
- The Oxford Companion to Ships and the Sea (co-editor with Peter Kemp, 2005; 2 ed., 2007, ISBN 9780199205684)
- The Oxford Companion to the Second World War (editor, adviser M. R. D. Foot, 1995; Online Version: 2014)
- Escape and Evasion: POW Breakouts in World War Two (1997)
- Sailing in Eccentric Circles (A collection of light-hearted anecdotes about the Royal Yacht Squadron, illustrated by Mike Peyton; 1989, Adlard Coles Nautical, ISBN 9780713659405)
