= Flambards =

1967 novel

- First edition (UK
- Author: K. M. Peyton
- Illustrator: Victor Ambrus
- Cover artist: Victor Ambrus
- Language: English
- Genre: Children's novel, pony book
- Publisher: Oxford University Press (UK); World Publishing Co. (US)
- Publication date: September 1967
- Publication place: United Kingdom
- Media type: Print (hardback and paperback)
- Pages: 193 (first edition)
- ISBN: 0-19-271278-0 (1987)
- OCLC: 465030
- LC Class: PZ7.P4483 Fl
- Followed by: The Edge of the Cloud

Flambards is a novel for children or young adults by K. M. Peyton, first published by Oxford University Press in 1967 with illustrations by Victor Ambrus. Alternatively, "Flambards" is the trilogy (1967–1969) or series (1967–1981) named after its first book. The series is set in England just before, during, and after World War I.

The novel Flambards (book one) features a teenage orphan and heiress Christina Parsons, who comes to live at Flambards, the impoverished Essex estate owned by her crippled and tyrannical uncle, William Russell, and his two sons, Mark and Will.

== Summary ==
Christina Parsons, who has been shunted around the family since she was orphaned at the age of five years in 1901, is sent to live at Flambards with her mother's half-brother, the crippled Russell. Her Aunt Grace speculates that Russell plans for Christina to marry his son Mark to restore Flambards to its former glory using the money that she will inherit on her twenty-first birthday. Mark is as brutish as his father, with a great love for hunting, whereas the younger son William is terrified of horses after a hunting accident and aspires to be an aviator. Christina soon develops a love for horses and hunting. She also finds friendship with the injured William, who challenges her ideas on class boundaries. William and Christina eventually fall in love and run away from the hunt ball to London, hoping to marry.

== Series ==
The fourth book controversially reversed the ending of the original trilogy, twelve years later and following the television series.

- Flambards (Oxford, 1967)
- The Edge of the Cloud (Oxford, 1969)
- Flambards in Summer (Oxford, 1969)
- Flambards Divided (1981)

For The Edge of the Cloud, Peyton won the annual Carnegie Medal from the Library Association, recognising the year's best children's book by a British subject. She was a commended runner-up for both the first and third books, the latter in competition with her Medal-winning work. (Note: Since 1995 there are usually eight books on the Carnegie shortlist. According to CCSU some runners up through 2002 were Commended (from 1955) or Highly Commended (from 1966). There were about 160 commendations of both kinds in 48 years, including four for 1967 (one highly commended) and three for 1969.)

She also won the 1970 Guardian Children's Fiction Prize, conferred by The Guardian newspaper and judged by a panel of British children's writers. Ordinarily the prize recognises one fiction book published during the preceding calendar year; exceptionally Peyton won for the Flambards trilogy completed in 1969. (Note: The Guardian Prize is once-in-a-lifetime; previous winners are ineligible. Six authors not quite including Peyton have won the Carnegie Medal for their Guardian Prize-winning books.)

The trilogy was adapted as a 13-part television series in 1979, Flambards, starring Christine McKenna as Christina Parsons.

World Publishing issued a US edition of the first book in 1968, retaining the Ambrus illustrations. World (Cleveland and New York) also published US editions of the second and third books in 1969 and 1970, also with the original illustrations, although all three novels were reset with a greater page-counts.
