= List of Helena Bonham Carter performances =

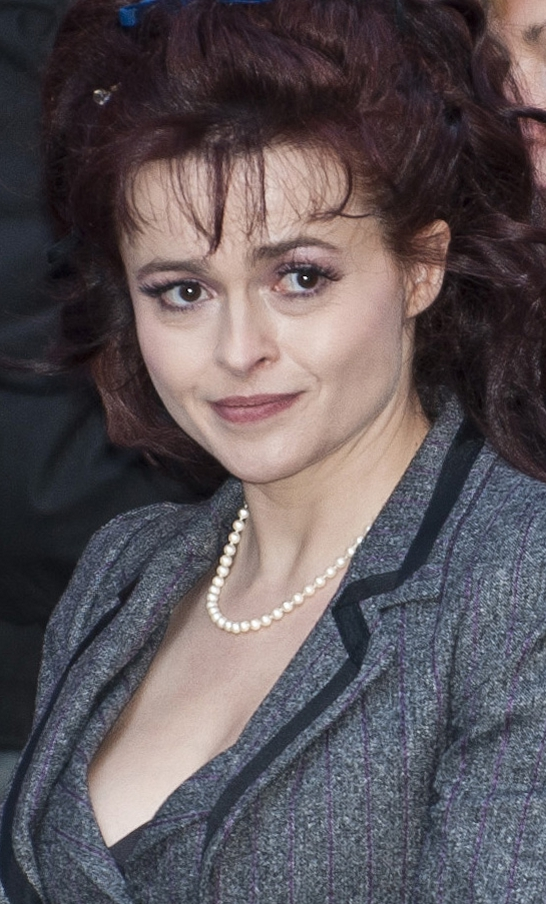
Bonham Carter at the 2011 Berlin International Film Festival

British actress Helena Bonham Carter has been acting since the early 1980s. First appearing in the television series A Pattern of Roses in 1983 before making her film debut playing Lucy Honeychurch in A Room with a View (1985) and the title character in Lady Jane (1986). She was nominated for the Academy Award for Best Actress for her role as Kate Croy in The Wings of the Dove (1997). For her role as Queen Elizabeth in The King's Speech (2010), she was nominated for the Academy Award for Best Supporting Actress and won the BAFTA Award for Best Actress in a Supporting Role. She also won the 2010 International Emmy Award for Best Actress for her role as the author Enid Blyton in the television film Enid (2009).

Her other film roles include Ophelia in Hamlet (1990), Where Angels Fear to Tread (1991), Howards End (1992), Elizabeth Lavenza in Mary Shelley's Frankenstein (1994), Woody Allen's Mighty Aphrodite (1995), Marla Singer in Fight Club (1999), Bellatrix Lestrange in four of the Harry Potter films (2007–11), Dr. Serena Kogan / Skynet in Terminator Salvation (2009), Miss Havisham in Great Expectations (2012), Madame Thénardier in Les Misérables (2012), the Fairy Godmother in Cinderella (2015) and Rose Weil in Ocean's 8 (2018).

She has frequently collaborated with director Tim Burton; in Planet of the Apes (2001), Big Fish (2003), Corpse Bride (2005), Charlie and the Chocolate Factory (2005), Sweeney Todd: The Demon Barber of Fleet Street (2007), Dark Shadows (2012), and playing the Red Queen in Alice in Wonderland (2010) and its sequel Alice Through the Looking Glass (2016).

Her other television work includes the television films Fatal Deception: Mrs. Lee Harvey Oswald (1993), Live from Baghdad (2002), Toast (2010), and Burton & Taylor (2013); and television series Love, Nina (2016), The Crown as Princess Margaret (2019–2020) and as Noele Gordon in the biographical miniseries Nolly (2023). She was originally cast for the fourth season of The White Lotus in a major role, however the role was rewritten and subsequently recast at the beginning of filming.

She has also narrated audiobooks. In 2011, Penguin Audios released an audiobook version of Anne Frank's The Diary of a Young Girl, narrated by Bonham Carter.

== Film ==
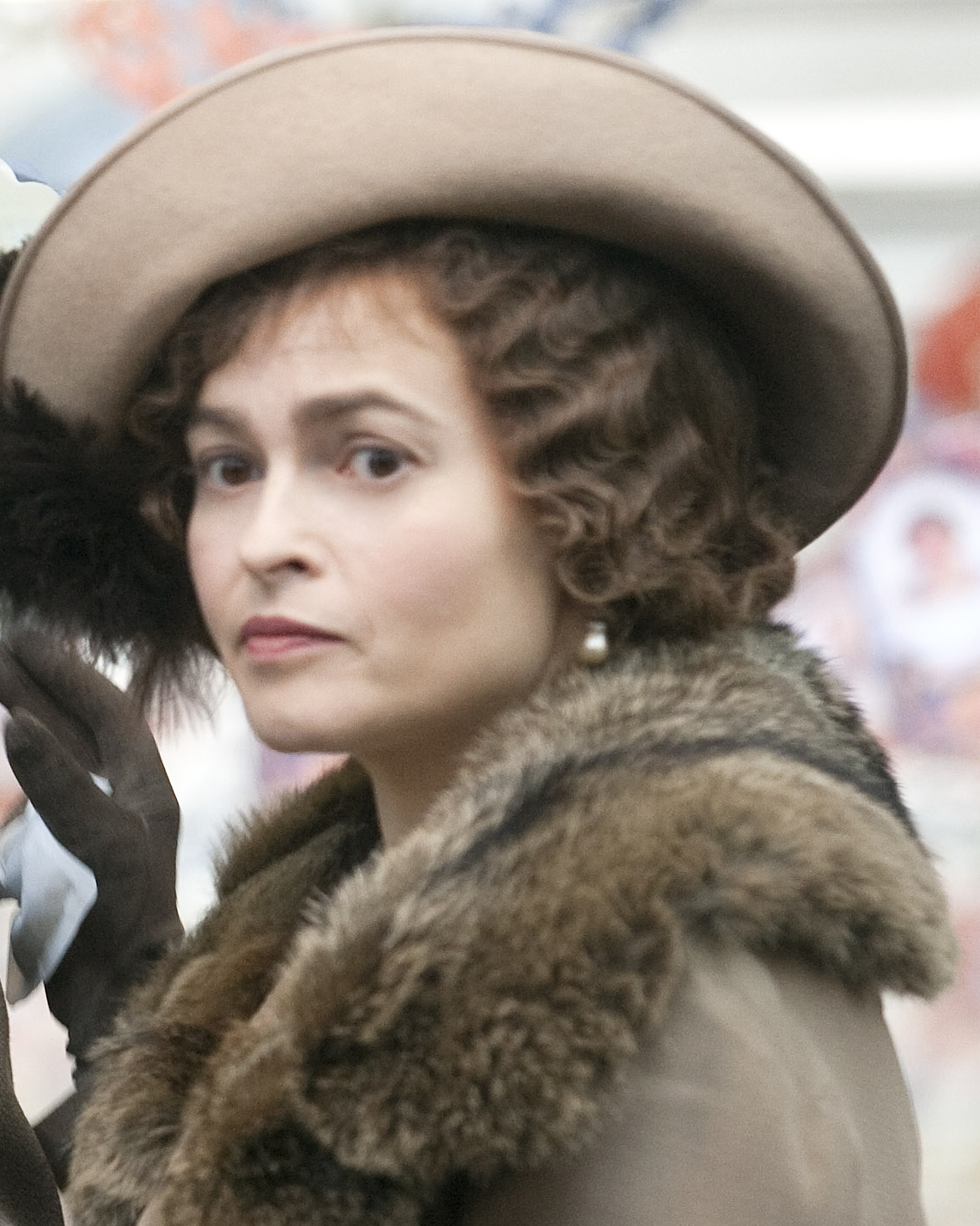
Bonham Carter while filming The King's Speech in December 2009

| Year | Title | Role | Notes | Ref. |
|---|---|---|---|---|
| 1985 | A Room with a View | Lucy Honeychurch | | |
| 1986 | Lady Jane | Lady Jane Grey | | |
| 1987 | Maurice | Lady at Cricket Match | Cameo | |
| 1987 | A Hazard of Hearts | Serena Staverley | | |
| 1988 | The Mask | Iris | Italian-language role | |
| 1988 | Six Minutes with Ludwig | The Star | | |
| 1989 | Francesco | Chiara Offreduccio | Italian-language role | |
| 1989 | Getting It Right | Lady Minerva Munday | | |
| 1990 | Hamlet | Ophelia | | |
| 1990 | The Early Life of Beatrix Potter | Beatrix Potter | | |
| 1991 | Where Angels Fear to Tread | Caroline Abbott | | |
| 1991 | Brown Bear's Wedding | White Bear | Voice | |
| 1992 | Howards End | Helen Schlegel | | |
| 1993 | Fatal Deception: Mrs. Lee Harvey Oswald | Marina Oswald Porter | | |
| 1994 | Mary Shelley's Frankenstein | Elizabeth Frankenstein | | |
| 1994 | Butter | Dorothy | Short film | |
| 1995 | Mighty Aphrodite | Amanda Weinrib | | |
| 1995 | Margaret's Museum | Margaret MacNeil | | |
| 1995 | Jeremy Hardy Gives Good Sex | Herself | Voice | |
| 1996 | Twelfth Night: Or What You Will | Olivia | | |
| 1996 | Portraits chinois | Ada | French-language role | |
| 1997 | The Wings of the Dove | Kate Croy | | |
| 1997 | Keep the Aspidistra Flying | Rosemary | also known as A Merry war | |
| 1997 | The Petticoat Expeditions | Narrator | Voice | |
| 1998 | Sweet Revenge | Karen Knightly | Also known as The Revengers' Comedies | |
| 1998 | The Theory of Flight | Jane Thatchard | | |
| 1999 | Carnivale | Milly | Voice | |
| 1999 | Fight Club | Marla Singer | | |
| 1999 | Women Talking Dirty | Cora | | |
| 1999 | The Nearly Complete and Utter History of Everything | Lily | | |
| 2001 | Planet of the Apes | Ari | | |
| 2001 | Novocaine | Susan Ivey | | |
| 2001 | Football | Mum | Short film | |
| 2002 | The Heart of Me | Dinah | | |
| 2002 | Till Human Voices Wake Us | Ruby | | |
| 2003 | Big Fish | Jennifer Hill / The Witch | | |
| 2004 | Lemony Snicket's A Series of Unfortunate Events | Beatrice Baudelaire | Uncredited cameo | |
| 2005 | Charlie and the Chocolate Factory | Mrs. Bucket | | |
| 2005 | Conversations with Other Women | Woman | | |
| 2005 | Wallace & Gromit: The Curse of the Were-Rabbit | Lady Tottington | Voice | |
| 2005 | Corpse Bride | Emily, the Corpse Bride | Voice | |
| 2006 | Sixty Six | Esther Reubens | | |
| 2007 | Sweeney Todd: The Demon Barber of Fleet Street | Mrs. Lovett | | |
| 2007 | Harry Potter and the Order of the Phoenix | Bellatrix Lestrange | | |
| 2009 | Harry Potter and the Half-Blood Prince | Bellatrix Lestrange | | |
| 2009 | Terminator Salvation | Dr. Serena Kogan / Skynet | | |
| 2009 | The Gruffalo | Mother Squirrel | Voice, short film | |
| 2010 | Alice in Wonderland | Red Queen / Iracebeth of Crims | | |
| 2010 | The King's Speech | Queen Elizabeth | | |
| 2010 | Harry Potter and the Deathly Hallows – Part 1 | Bellatrix Lestrange | | |
| 2011 | Harry Potter and the Deathly Hallows – Part 2 | Bellatrix Lestrange | | |
| 2011 | The Gruffalo's Child | Mother Squirrel | Voice, short film | |
| 2012 | Dark Shadows | Julia Hoffman | | |
| 2012 | A Therapy | Patient | Short film | |
| 2012 | Great Expectations | Miss Havisham | | |
| 2012 | Les Misérables | Mme. Thénardier | | |
| 2013 | The Lone Ranger | Red Harrington | | |
| 2013 | The Young and Prodigious T.S. Spivet | Dr. Clair | | |
| 2014 | Night Will Fall | Narrator | Documentary film | |
| 2015 | Cinderella | The Fairy Godmother | | |
| 2015 | Suffragette | Edith Ellyn | | |
| 2016 | Alice Through the Looking Glass | Red Queen / Iracebeth of Crims | | |
| 2017 | Poles Apart | Nanuk | Voice, short film | |
| 2017 | 55 Steps | Eleanor Riese | | |
| 2018 | Sgt. Stubby: An American Hero | Margaret Conroy | Voice | |
| 2018 | Ocean's 8 | Rose Weil | | |
| 2020 | Dragonheart: Vengeance | Siveth | Voice, direct-to-video | |
| 2020 | Tintoretto: A Rebel in Venice | Narrator | Documentary film | |
| 2020 | Enola Holmes | Eudoria Holmes | | |
| 2022 | The House | Jen | Voice | |
| 2022 | Enola Holmes 2 | Eudoria Holmes | | |
| 2022 | Three Minutes: A Lengthening | Narrator | | |
| 2023 | One Life | Babi Winton | | |
| 2023 | Merchant Ivory | Herself | | |
| 2024 | Four Letters of Love | Margaret Gore | | |
| 2026 | Enola Holmes 3 | Eudoria Holmes | | |
| TBA | The Housekeeper † | Adelaide | Filming | |

Key
| † | Denotes films that have not yet been released |

== Television ==
| Year | Title | Role | Notes | Ref. |
|---|---|---|---|---|
| 1983 | A Pattern of Roses | Netty Bellinger | Television film | |
| 1987 | Miami Vice | Dr. Theresa Lyons | 2 episodes | |
| 1988 | Screen Two | Jo Marriner | Episode: "The Vision" | |
| 1989 | Theatre Night | Raina Petkoff | Episode: "Arms and the Man" | |
| 1991 | Jackanory | Reader | Story: "The Way to Sattin Shore" | |
| 1993 | Dancing Queen | Pandora / Julie | Television film | |
| 1994 | A Dark-Adapted Eye | Faith Severn (adult) | 2 episodes | |
| 1994 | Absolutely Fabulous | Dream Saffron | Episode: "Hospital" | |
| 1994 | The Good Sex Guide | Herself | Episode #2.1 | |
| 1996 | The Great War and the Shaping of the 20th Century | Vera Brittain | 2 episodes | |
| 1998 | Merlin | Morgan le Fay | 3 episodes | |
| 2002 | Live from Baghdad | Ingrid Formanek | Television film | |
| 2003 | Henry VIII | Anne Boleyn | 2 episodes | |
| 2005 | Magnificent 7 | Maggi Jackson | Television film | |
| 2009 | Enid | Enid Blyton | Television film | |
| 2010 | Toast | Joan Potter | Television film | |
| 2011 | Life's Too Short | Herself | Episode #1.3 | |
| 2013 | Burton & Taylor | Elizabeth Taylor | Television film | |
| 2014 | Turks & Caicos | Margot Tyrrell | Television film | |
| 2014 | Salting the Battlefield | Margot Tyrrell | Television film | |
| 2015 | Codes of Conduct | Esther Kaufmann | Pilot | |
| 2016 | Love, Nina | George | 5 episodes | |
| 2017 | Saying Goodbye | Herself / narrator | Documentary | |
| 2019 | The Dark Crystal: Age of Resistance | Maudra Mayrin/The All-Maudra | Voice, 4 episodes | |
| 2019 | My Grandparents' War | Herself | 1 episode | |
| 2019–2020 | The Crown | Princess Margaret, Countess of Snowdon | Main role (17 episodes) | |
| 2020 | Cinderella: A Comic Relief Pantomime for Christmas | Lady Devilla | Pantomime | |
| 2020 | Quentin Blake's Clown | Narrator | Animated film | |
| 2021 | The Cleaner | Sheila | Episode: "The Widow" | |
| 2021 | Sofology | Herself | TV advertisement | |
| 2022 | Harry Potter 20th Anniversary: Return to Hogwarts | Herself | HBO Max special | |
| 2022 | Ten Percent | Herself | Episode #1.2 | |
| 2022 | Wild Babies | Narrator | 8 episodes | |
| 2023 | Stephen Sondheim's Old Friends | Herself | BBC concert special | |
| 2023 | Nolly | Noele "Nolly" Gordon | 3 episodes | |
| 2023 | Charles III: The Coronation Year | Narrator | Documentary | |
| 2026 | Agatha Christie's Seven Dials | Lady Caterham | Miniseries | |
| TBA | California Avenue † | Eddie | Television series | |

Key
| † | Denotes television productions that have not yet been released |

== Theatre ==
| Year | Title | Role | Venue | Ref. |
|---|---|---|---|---|
| 1987 | The Tempest | Miranda | Oxford Playhouse | |
| 1988 | The Woman in White | Laura Fairlie | Greenwich Theatre, London | |
| 1989 | The Chalk Garden | Laurel | Theatre Royal Windsor/Yvonne Arnaud Theatre, Guildford | |
| 1991 | The House of Bernarda Alba | Magdalena | Nottingham Playhouse | |
| 1992 | The Barber of Seville | Rosina | Watford Palace Theatre | |
| 1992 | Trelawney of the Wells | Imogen Parrot | Comedy Theatre, London | |

== Music videos ==
| Year | Artist | Song | Ref. |
|---|---|---|---|
| 2012 | Rufus Wainwright | "Out of the Game" | |
| 2015 | Bryan Adams | "Brand New Day" | |

== Video games ==
| Year | Title | Voice role | Notes | Ref. |
|---|---|---|---|---|
| 2005 | Wallace & Gromit: The Curse of the Were-Rabbit | Lady Tottington | | |
| 2018 | Call of Duty: Black Ops 4 | Madame Mirela | "Dead of the Night" map | |

== Radio ==
| Year | Title | Role | Notes | Ref. |
|---|---|---|---|---|
| 1985 | The Reluctant Debutante | Unknown | BBC Radio 4 | |
| 1989 | The Happiest of All Princesses | Unknown | BBC Radio 4 | |
| 1993 | The Secret Garden | Narrator | By Frances Burnett | |
| 1993 | The Whales' Song | Narrator | By Dyan Sheldon | |
| 1994 | The Seagull | Nina Mikhailovna Zarechnaya | BBC Radio 4 | |
| 1994 | A Dog So Small | Narrator | By Philippa Pearce | |
| 1994 | The Way to Sattin Shore | Narrator | By Philippa Pearce | |
| 1995 | Song of Love | Unknown | BBC Radio 4 | |
| 1995 | Remember Me | Narrator | | |
| 1996 | I Capture the Castle | Rose | BBC Radio 4 | |
| 1997 | A House by the Sea | Unknown | BBC Radio 4 | |
| 1997 | The Diary of Anne Frank | Narrator | | |
| 1998 | Lantern Slides | Violet Bonham Carter | BBC Radio 4 | |
| 2000 | As You Like It | Rosalind | BBC Radio 4 | |
| 2004 | The Rubenstein Kiss | Unknown | Postponed | |
| 2010 | Private Lives | Amanda | BBC Radio 4 | |

== Theme park attractions ==
| Year | Title | Role | Venue |
|---|---|---|---|
| 2014 | Harry Potter and the Escape from Gringotts | Bellatrix Lestrange | Universal Studios Florida |

== See also ==
- List of awards and nominations received by Helena Bonham Carter
