= The Kids from 47A =

British children's TV series (1973–1975)

- Country of origin: United Kingdom
- Original language: English
- No. of series: 3
- No. of episodes: 42

Production
- Running time: 30 minutes

Original release
- Network: ITV
- Release: 30 May 1973 – 30 October 1974

The Kids from 47A is a British children's television series first broadcast on ITV in 1973. It was produced by Associated Television. Three series were made: the first (comprising 15 episodes) was shown in 1973, the second (13 episodes) and third (13 episodes) in 1974. The third series ends with Jess (Christine McKenna) getting married. A one-off episode (promoted as a comedy and entitled "Home Sweet Home") was broadcast on 31 August 1975.

Scriptwriters for The Kids from 47A included writer and actress Lynda La Plante and Phil Redmond in 1974.

== Plot ==
The series is about four children whose widowed mother is taken into hospital, leaving them to cope on their own. The eldest—office worker Jess Gathercole—becomes the family matriarch, making every effort to keep her schoolchild sister and brothers at home with her.

At the start of the second series, the Gathercole mother has died and Jess is only able to keep the family together after battling with social services, who continue to keep a watchful eye.

== Cast ==
Jess was played by Christine McKenna, her bookish sister Binny by Gaynor Hodgson and her brothers—football-mad Willy and primary schoolboy George—by Nigel Greaves and Russell Lewis, respectively. Other parts were played by Lloyd Lamble (as Jess' employer) and Joan Newell.

Christine McKenna would later star in the TV adaptation of Flambards and is now a television producer in the US, while Russell Lewis went on to become a successful screenwriter. Nigel Greaves has had roles in Tenko and Kenneth Branagh's cinema adaptation of Shakespeare's Henry V.

== Production ==
Writers for the series included Lynda La Plante, Gail Renard and Phil Redmond. The directors were Alan Coleman, Richard Bramall and Jonathan Wright-Miller. Script editor Philip Hinchcliffe went on to become the producer of Doctor Who for the BBC from 1974 to 1977.
