= Pennington's Seventeenth Summer =

- First edition cover
- Author: K. M. Peyton
- Publisher: Oxford University Press
- Publication date: 1970
- ISBN: 978-0-192-71318-6

Pennington's Seventeenth Summer (also called Pennington's Last Term) is the first novel in a quartet for young adults by K. M. Peyton. The series is about Patrick Pennington, known to his friends as Penn. In this first title he is sixteen and in his final year of school. The novel was first published in 1970.

== Plot summary ==
Penn is a troublemaker and is generally disliked by all but two of his teachers, especially Mr Marsh (or ‘Soggy’), who has had it in for him for years. Penn has very little faith in himself or those around him. He habitually causes trouble for himself, due largely to his defensiveness and inability to consider the consequences of his actions. He has already had a number of brushes with the law.

Only the games master, Mr Matthews, and his piano teacher, Mr Crocker, see any potential in him. In this book he discovers that his musical ability is much more extraordinary than he had thought and that he may actually enjoy playing the piano. However, his temper and rash behaviour are likely to lead him to jail before he has a chance to see where his talent can take him.

== Sequels ==
This book was followed by The Beethoven Medal (1971) and Pennington’s Heir (1973).

In The Beethoven Medal, Pat - now a music student - meets 16-year-old Ruth Hollis (chief character of Fly-By-Night and The Team, also by Peyton). While his musical talent is developing, he has yet to master his natural aggression.

In 'Pennington's Heir', Pat and Ruth marry and have a son. They live in poverty while Pat struggles to establish his career as a concert pianist.

The final book in which Patrick Pennington features is Marion's Angels (later retitled Falling Angels). Pat, now a successful professional musician, and Ruth meet Marion Carver and her widowed father. Echoes of a medieval past are mixed with the present as Pat embarks on a concert series to raise funds to restore the church Marion has cared for.
