= The Right-Hand Man =

1977 historical novel by K. M. Peyton

- First edition cover
- Author: K. M. Peyton
- Illustrator: Victor Ambrus
- Language: English
- Genre: Children's novel
- Publisher: Oxford University Press (UK)
- Publication date: 1977
- Publication place: United Kingdom
- Media type: Print (Hardback)
- Pages: 218 pp (UK hardback first edition)
- ISBN: 978-0-19-271391-9 (UK hardback first edition)
- OCLC: 3735422
- LC Class: PZ7.P4483 Ri

The Right-Hand Man is a young adult historical novel by K. M. Peyton, first published in 1977. The book is set in 1818 in Essex and London, during the Georgian era. It tells the story of Ned Rowlands, a talented stagecoach driver who meets the three creatures he loves best on the same day: a horse, a woman, and the man who will become his employer, Lord Ironminster.

Lord Ironminster was a renowned and daring dragsman until he lost his right arm and his father in an accident. He is sick with consumption (tuberculosis) and under pressure from his mother to marry a suitable wife, settle down and produce an heir. Lord Ironminster is more interested in winning a wager of 5,000 pounds to race from his home to Whitechapel Church in less than 75 minutes. His cousins (who will inherit on his death) are also keen to win the wager.

The story details how Lord Ironminster tricks Ned Rowlands into coming to work for him as his coachman (his right-hand man), their efforts to win the wager, and the friendship that develops between them.

== Film ==
The Right Hand Man
- Directed by: Di Drew
- Based on: novel by K. M. Peyton
- Starring: Rupert Everett; Catherine McClements; Hugo Weaving
- Release date: 1987
- Country: Australia
- Language: English
- Budget: A$5,459,000
- Box office: AU $9,660 (Australia)

The Right Hand Man was made into a film in 1985, and released in Australian cinemas in November 1987.

=== Cast ===
- Rupert Everett as Lord Harry Ironminster
- Catherine McClements as Sarah Redbridge
- Hugo Weaving as Ned Devine
- Arthur Dignam as Dr Redbridge
- Jennifer Claire as Lady Ironminster
- Ralph Cotterill as Sam
- Anna Lee as Worn Woman

=== Production ===
K. M. Peyton's novel had been optioned by actors Steven Grives and Tom Oliver who formed a company, Yarraman, to make the film. Grives had acted in a mini series, Flambards also based on a novel by Peyton.

Money was raised through the company UAA to make the movie which was mainly shot around Bathurst, New South Wales, in particular at Abercrombie House. The shoot began 9 October 1985 and went for ten weeks.

=== Release ===
The film was not a large success at the box office.

On 6 October, 2021 the film received a Blu-ray release from Umbrella Entertainment as volume 9 of their Sunburnt Screens collection.
