= Gaynor Hodgson =

British child actress

Gaynor Hodgson is a British former child actress who was mainly active in the 1970s.

She had important roles in two series: Binny in The Kids from 47A and Becky in A Little Princess. She was also Nola Marsh in Crossroads.
