= Frank Knight (writer) =

Francis Edgar Knight (1905–1998) was a navigation instructor in the Royal Air Force during World War II, after his retirement he became an author of fiction and non-fiction.

== Biography ==
Knight was born in 1905. At the age of 15, Knight became an apprentice in the Merchant Navy. For ten years he served in many countries, visiting scores of ports, and obtaining his Extra Master Mariner's certificate when he was 24. Throughout the war he taught navigation in the RAF to pupil navigators of Bomber and Coastal Commands. He flew regularly with pupils both in Britain and South Africa.

After the war he reverted to selling yachts before settling down to write about the sea, including works in fiction and non fiction. He died in 1998 after publishing more than 45 books, primarily sea stories and war battles.

Frank Knights books were used in schools around the world for education and were fun to read, and used as supplementary reading for learning history.

== Personal ==
Frank Knight married in 1933 to Elizabeth Mather, whom he called Betty. They emigrated to South Africa in 1940 with their two children, and went on to have two more children. After the Second World they came back to England on a troopship. In 1966 Knight appeared on Blue Peter; he was interviewed by Lance Percival talking about old children's stories which he had used as inspiration for early cartoons.

== Bibliography ==
Knight authored the following books:

- The Albatross Comes Home
- The Island of Radiant Pearls (The Up-side-down Island)
- Beginner’s Guide to the Sea
- Mudlarks and Mysteries
- Four an Half Deck
- Stories of Famous Sea Fights
- The Bluenose Pirate
- Clippers to China
- Family on the Tide
- The Adventure Book for Boys
- Kit Baxter’s War. Illustrated by John Lawrence
- Colins Boys Annual
- Met de compagnie naar Bengalen Meppel, A.Roelofs Goor. Also published in Swedish as Resan till Bengalen (1955)
- He sailed with Blackbeard
- Stories of Famous Sea Adventures
- The Partick Steamboat
- The Sea Story: Being a Guide to Nautical Reading from Ancient Times to the close of the Sailing Ship Era
- Daily Mail Boys Annual
- Onrust aan de waddenkust Utrecht, Het Spectrum 1959
- The Sea Chest. Illustrated by William Riley. published by Collins & sons
- The Sea’s Fool
- The Last of the Lallows. Illustrated by William Stobbs. Published by Macmillan.&.co
- The Ship That Came Home
- Stories of Famous Explorers by Land. Illustrated by Will Nickless. published by The Westminster Press
- The Golden Monkey. Illustrated by Lothar Walter. published by Macmillan & co
- The Young Captain Cook
- The Young Drake
- The Young Columbus
- The Sea Chest: Stories of Adventure at Sea
- Up, Sea Beggars!
- Remember Vera Cruz! illustrated by John Lawrence. Published by MacDonld.
- Captain Cook & the Voyage of the Endeavour (1768–1771)
- Rebel Admiral
- Russia Fights Japan
- Ships Now and Then
- Stories of Famous Explorers by Sea
- That Rare Captain: Sir Francis Drake
- General-at-Sea. The life of Admiral Robert Blake
- The Clipper Ship, Collins 1973
- The Golden Age of the Galleon. published by William Collins Sons & Co Ltd, 1976
- Stories of Famous Ships
- Voyage to Bengal published by Macmillan & Co. London
- Captain Anson and the Treasure of Spain
- Olaf’s sword
- True stories of the sea, Benn Editions, 1973, with illustrations by Victor Ambrus
