= Jimmy Cornell =

British-Romanian yachtsman and author

- Born: Dragoș Corneliu Cișmașu; 1940 (age 85–86); Romania
- Occupations: Yachtsman; author; sailing event organizer
- Known for: Founder of the World Cruising Club; author of World Cruising Routes
- Notable work: World Cruising Routes; Atlantic Rally for Cruisers (ARC)
- Spouse: Gwenda Cornell
- Children: Doina; Ivan

Jimmy Cornell (born Dragoș Corneliu Cișmașu; 1940 in Romania) is a Romanian-born British yachtsman, bestselling author of World Cruising Routes, among other books and the founder of the World Cruising Club.

== Biography ==
Jimmy Cornell was born in Romania in 1940, growing up in Brașov. After studying Economics at the University of Bucharest he emigrated to London, England in 1969 with his British wife Gwenda. He took up sailing as a hobby whilst working as a reporter for the BBC World Service.

In 1975 Cornell, leaving from the coast of England, started a voyage around the world, with Gwenda and their two children (Doina, aged 7, and Ivan, aged 5). It ended up lasting 6 years, taking them to 70 countries and encompassing 68,000 miles. Cornell sent back regular radio reports to the BBC World Service throughout the voyage, which was to become the first of three circumnavigations he has completed totalling over 200,000 miles afloat.

In 1986 Cornell set up the Atlantic Rally for Cruisers (ARC), in which cruising yachtsmen who want to complete a transatlantic crossing sail together in loose convoy. Following the success of the first ARC, Cornell founded the World Cruising Club and organized a few other events: the Blue Planet Odyssey, the Atlantic Odyssey, and the European Odyssey. Cornell also wrote the book World Cruising Routes; first published in 1987 by Adlard Coles Nautical, it has gone on to sell 150,000 copies.

== World Cruising Routes ==
One of Cornell's most important successes is the book World Cruising Routes, written with the intention of helping other long distance sailors on trips around the world. The first edition was published in 1987 by Adlard Coles Nautical, having sold more than 150,000 copies, throughout its nine editions,

World Cruising Routes has established itself as a "de facto" bible for long-distance navigators for more than 25 years. It is a book designed to plan cruises anywhere in the world, with a planning guide for almost 1,000 navigation routes through all the oceans of the world, from the icy latitudes of the Arctic and the Antarctic to the southern tropical seas, with more than 6,000 landmarks to help mariners plan individual routes, assessing the effects of global warming on cruise routes. Being oriented to the specific needs of the cruise navigators, it contains information about the winds, the currents, the regional and seasonal climate, as well as suggestions about the optimal schedules for the individual routes, although it should be used together with the Regional Sailing Directions, according to Cruising World that defines it as: "The most important book for long distance travelers in decades", actually, since the British Admiralty 1895 book: Ocean Passages for the World.

== Books ==
After the success of World Cruising Routes (1st edition, 1987), Cornell has written several companion books:

- World Cruising Routes (7th edition), 2014, Adlard Coles Nautical, ISBN 978-1408158883
- World Cruising Handbook (3rd edition), 2001, Adlard Coles Nautical, ISBN 978-0713658279
- A Passion for the Sea, 2009, Adlard Coles Nautical, ISBN 978-1408122686
- World Cruising Destinations, 2010, Adlard Coles Nautical, ISBN 978-1408114018
- Cornell's Ocean Atlas, 2011, Cornell Sailing Ltd (with Ivan Cornell), ISBN 978-0955639654
- World Voyage Planner, 2012, Adlard Coles Nautical, ISBN 978-0955639654
