= The Feathered Serpent (TV series) =

British children's TV series (1976–1978)

- Genre: Drama
- Created by: John Kane
- Directed by: Vic Hughes; Michael Custance; Stan Woodward
- Starring: Patrick Troughton; Diane Keen; Brian Deacon
- Composer: David Fanshawe
- Country of origin: United Kingdom
- Original language: English
- No. of series: 2
- No. of episodes: 12

Production
- Running time: 30 minutes

Original release
- Network: ITV
- Release: 21 June 1976 – 8 May 1978

The Feathered Serpent is a British children's serial costume drama television series made for ITV by Thames Television, set in pre-Columbian Mexico and starring Patrick Troughton as the scheming High Priest Nasca. It is an adventure story about good and evil. Two series were first broadcast in 1976 and 1978.

== Plot ==
The series is set in 750 AD. The story primarily takes place in an unnamed city, which is inhabited by an unnamed people. The inhabitants of the city are Aztec-like, and the viewer assumes that they are in fact Aztecs.

The inhabitants of the city formerly worshipped the god Quala, who is a feathered serpent. At the start of the series, the religion of Quala, which did not involve human sacrifice, has been replaced by that of the god Teshcata, who is a smoking mirror, which does involve human sacrifice. Kukulkan is attempting to form an alliance with the Toltecs (who worship Quala and not Teshcata), through a dynastic marriage between Chimalma and Heumac, the object of which is to convert Kukulkan's people from the religion of Teshcata to that of Quala. Nasca opposes the proposed alliance, marriage and change of the national religion. There follows a struggle between the proponents of the two religions. This struggle results in the abolition of the religion of Teshcata; the defeat of Nasca, who is walled up in his own secret passages inside the walls of the palace; the restoration of religion of Quala; the marriage of Chimalma and Heumac, and their coronation with the two crowns of Chichen Itza.

== Episodes ==
=== Series 1 ===
- Episode 1. First broadcast 21 June 1976.
- Episode 2. First broadcast 28 June 1976.
- Episode 3. First broadcast 5 July 1976. Chadac murders Kukulkan.
- Episode 4. First broadcast 12 July 1976.
- Episode 5. First broadcast 19 July 1976. Mahoutec and his Jaguar Knights attack the Toltec army.
- Episode 6. First broadcast 26 July 1976. Heumac kills Chadac and appears to kill Nasca.

=== Series 2 ===
- Episode 1. First broadcast 3 April 1978.
- Episode 2. First broadcast 10 April 1978. Heumac and Tozo enter the stone cage beneath the Pyramid of the Sun.
- Episode 3. First broadcast 17 April 1978.
- Episode 4. First broadcast 24 April 1978.
- Episode 5. First broadcast 1 May 1978.
- Episode 6. First broadcast 8 May 1978.

== Cast and characters ==
- Nasca: Patrick Troughton. Nasca is the High Priest of the religion of the god Teshcata. He is evil.
- Chimalma: Diane Keen. Chimalma is the daughter of Kukulkan, and becomes Empress after his death. The character is named after the Aztec goddess Chimalma.
- Heumac: Brian Deacon. Heumac is Prince of the Toltecs of Tula.
- Kukulkan: Tony Steedman. Kukulkan is the Emperor. He is good. The character is named after the Maya feathered serpent god Kukulkan.
- Tozo: Richard Willis. Tozo is messenger of Heumac.
- Mahoutec: Robert Gary. Mahoutec is commander, captain or general of the Jaguar Knights.
- Chadac: George Lane Cooper. Chadac is the servant of Nasca.
- Maxtla: Alfred Hoffman. Maxtla is the court architect.
- Otolmi: George Cormack. Otolmi is the priest of Quala.
- Xipec: Granville Saxton. Xipec is Governor of the Gold Region.
- Keelag: Sheila Burrell. Keelag is a witch.
- Mataque: Robert Russell

== Crew ==
- Written by John Kane
- Designed by Patrick Downing (Series 1) and Jan Chaney (Series 2)
- Music composed by David Fanshawe
- Produced by Vic Hughes

== Production ==
The Feathered Serpent is related to Doctor Who serials including The Aztecs and Planet of the Spiders. The storyline of The Feathered Serpent has similarities to the storyline of The Aztecs. Troughton appeared as both Nasca and Doctor Who. Kane and Cormack were involved in both The Feathered Serpent and Planet of the Spiders. Randall appeared in both The Aztecs and Planet of the Spiders.

Firenze Peruzzi made the costumes used in The Feathered Serpent. Martin Baugh designed the costumes, except the wedding gown. The wedding gown was a modified version of the winning entry submitted to a competition in Look-in, which was designed by Simon Theobald. McGown and Docherty described the wedding gown as "outrageous".

The series was filmed in Studio 2 of Teddington Studios.

The Feathered Serpent appeared on the front cover of TVTimes in June 1976.

The fictional god Quala is a substitute for the Aztec god Quetzacoatl.

== Release ==
=== Broadcast ===
The Feathered Serpent was first broadcast on ITV (including STV and Ulster) on Mondays from 21 June to 26 July 1976 and from 3 April to 8 May 1978. The series was repeated on that channel in 1977 and 1979. It was also broadcast in Australia on ABV2 and ABN2 in 1978 and 1981, and by RTM1 in Malaysia and Singapore in 1987.

=== DVD ===
A 2 Disc set of Region 2 DVDs containing both series of The Feathered Serpent was released in the UK by Network Distributing in February 2009. A 2 Disc set of Region 1 DVDs was released by Acorn Media in 2011. A 2 Disc set of Region 4 DVDs was released by Shock Entertainment in 2013.

== Reception ==
In 1976, The Observer described the series as "spicy". Michael Bartlett said the series is "satisfyingly complex". In 2011, Jeremy Biltz said the series is "a simple pleasure". In 2017, Jameson said the series is "hugely entertaining".

In 1976, Phillips said the series went from richly dramatic to richly farcical.

Dunkley said he thought that the series was aimed at young schoolchildren, including six year olds. Sue Turner responded by saying that the series was not aimed at young schoolchildren, and was instead aimed at children aged ten and above.

In 1978, the Australian censors prohibited some of the later episodes of the series from being broadcast in a 5:40pm time slot. The final episode was broadcast in Australia in 1981.

Rosemary Long said that Diane Keen was "stunning" in this series.

== Book ==
A novelisation by Maureen Gregson was published by Corgi Carousel in 1977.
