= Adlard Coles Nautical =

Nautical publisher in London, England

- Parent company: Bloomsbury Publishing Plc
- Founded: 1947
- Founder: K Adlard Coles
- Country of origin: United Kingdom
- Headquarters location: London
- Nonfiction topics: Nautical books
- Imprints: Thomas Reed, Reeds Nautical Almanacs, Conway
- Official website: Adlard Coles Nautical

Adlard Coles Nautical is a nautical publisher, with over 300 books in print. The company publishes books on topics of interest to sailors and motorboaters and also ‘landlubbers’ with an interest in the sea. Their list includes almanacs, cruising guides, pilot books and how-to instruction books, as well as large format photographic books, sailing narratives and sea-related reference, maritime history, humour and trivia books.

Adlard Coles Nautical has been part of Bloomsbury Publishing since 2003.

== History ==
The company was founded by yachtsman Kaines Adlard Coles, OBE in 1947. He wrote many of the books, including pilots, sailing narratives and Heavy Weather Sailing, which continues to be published by the company (in an updated form).

A & C Black Publishers, which had bought Nautical Books in 1987, acquired the Adlard Coles company in 1990 and merged the two companies into the Adlard Coles Nautical imprint.

In 2000, A & C Black was bought by Bloomsbury Publishing Plc and in 2003 the company acquired the Reeds Nautical Almanac. In September 2014, Bloomsbury bought Conway Publishing and the maritime history list now complements the Adlard Coles Nautical imprint.

== Notable authors in the Adlard Coles Nautical fold ==
- Maurice and Maralyn Bailey
- Frank Bethwaite
- Dee Caffari
- Erskine Childers
- Bill Cooper
- Laurel Cooper
- Jimmy Cornell
- Tom Cunliffe
- Frank Dye
- David Ellery
- Paul Elvstrøm
- Maurice Griffiths
- Paul Heiney
- Halsey Herreshoff
- Sir Robin Knox-Johnston
- Tristan Jones
- Sam Llewellyn
- Czesław Marchaj
- Bernard Moitessier
- Crispin Money-Coutts, 9th Baron Latymer
- Mike Peyton
- Libby Purves
- Joshua Slocum
- Richard Woodman
