= Going Home (Peyton novel) =

1982 novel by K. M. Peyton

- First US edition
- Author: K. M. Peyton
- Cover artist: Chris Molan
- Language: English
- Genre: Children's novel
- Publisher: Oxford University Press (UK); Philomel Books (US)
- Publication date: 1982
- Publication place: United Kingdom
- Media type: Print (Hardback)
- Pages: 104 p. (UK hardback first edition)
- ISBN: 0-19-271459-7 (UK hardback first edition)
- OCLC: 16562358

Going Home is a children's novel by K. M. Peyton. It was first published in 1982.

== Plot ==
The book is set in the present day, starting in London but mostly set in Normandy, France. It tells the story of Milly and Micky who come from a problem family. Their father has abandoned the family and their mother has gone into hospital. The book does not say, but it is implied the mother has depression.

The children's uncle and aunt take them on a narrow boat holiday to France. The children quickly decide they do not like it, and decide to make their own way back to England. The story details how they make their way home using their initiative and whatever resources become available.
