= David Fanshawe =

British composer and ethnomusicologist (1942–2010)

- Born: 19 April 1942
- Died: 5 July 2010 (aged 68)
- Occupations: English composer, ethnomusicologist, self-styled explorer

David Arthur Fanshawe (19 April 1942 – 5 July 2010) was an English composer and self-styled explorer with a fervent interest in world music. His best-known composition is the 1972 choral work African Sanctus.

== Life ==
Fanshawe was born in Paignton, Devon in 1942. His father was an officer in the Royal Artillery who played a central role in the planning of D-Day. His father's stories of military service in India fired Fanshawe's enthusiasm for travel and adventure. His first ambition was to be an explorer, but when he attended St George's School, Windsor Castle and Stowe School he discovered a love of music. His severe dyslexia, however, prevented him from reading a musical score and becoming a chorister.

At Stowe School he spent much of his spare time learning to play the piano, and when he was 17 he was discovered by the mother of a school friend, a French baroness who tutored him in the piano even after he left the school in 1959. He started his adult career as a musician and film editor for a small production company in Wimbledon in London who made documentary films. In 1965 Fanshawe won a scholarship to the Royal College of Music, where he studied composition under John Lambert. During his holidays he continued to travel widely in Europe and the Middle East. During a summer spent hitchhiking in Iran he heard Islamic music for the first time and was immediately attracted to its beauty. During further travels in Iraq and Bahrain he recorded the traditional music he heard.

On completing his studies in 1969, Fanshawe travelled up the Nile from the Mediterranean Sea, visiting Egypt, Sudan, Uganda and Kenya over a three-year period before finally reaching Lake Victoria. He brought a small stereo tape recorder on his journey and would persuade local musicians to play for him. Returning to the United Kingdom in 1972 with several hundreds of hours of recordings made during his travels, Fanshawe used the material to compose what became his best known work, African Sanctus. The album was written and conceived with David's first wife, Judith Croasdell, in the 1970s in their first home at East Sheen, London, after many perilous trips to Africa together. After this work he became widely known for the composition of choral works. Besides vocal pieces, he also composed the score for films and television, including films such as Tarka the Otter (1979) and Dirty Weekend (1993), and TV productions such as the BBC's Softly, Softly: Taskforce and When the Boat Comes In and also ITV's The Feathered Serpent, Flambards and The Good Companions. His ethnic field recordings have featured in countless TV documentaries, including Musical Mariner and Tropical Beat, as well as various feature films including Mountains of the Moon, How to Make an American Quilt, Seven Years in Tibet and Gangs of New York.

During a ten-year odyssey across the islands of the Pacific Ocean begun in 1978, Fanshawe collected several thousand hours of indigenous music, and documented the music and oral traditions of Polynesia, Micronesia and Melanesia in journals and photographs. These pieces form the core of his collection, an archive of approximately 2,000 hours of ethnic music and 60,000 images. Pacific Song, a movement based on this material, premiered in Miami in 2007. This was the first completed section of Pacific Odyssey, a new choral work which Fanshawe conceived on a grander scale than African Sanctus. He did not complete the work by the time of his death.

Fanshawe detailed his plans for Pacific Odyssey in an interview with Rory Johnston on Music Now on the BBC World Service, 15 January 1986. An extended version of this including Fanshawe’s recordings and a movement of an intermezzo is on You Tube. Johnston also recorded a discussion in depth with Fanshawe about his life and work, approaching two and a half hours. This is in Johnston’s possession.

The University of the West of England awarded the honorary degree of Doctor of Music to Fanshawe in 2007 for his pursuit of musical excellence and for introducing music into lives of people who could neither read nor write music. Fanshawe also earned a Churchill Fellowship and a nomination for an Ivor Novello Award for the recording of African Sanctus.

A bench dedicated to David Fanshawe in Portbail (France)

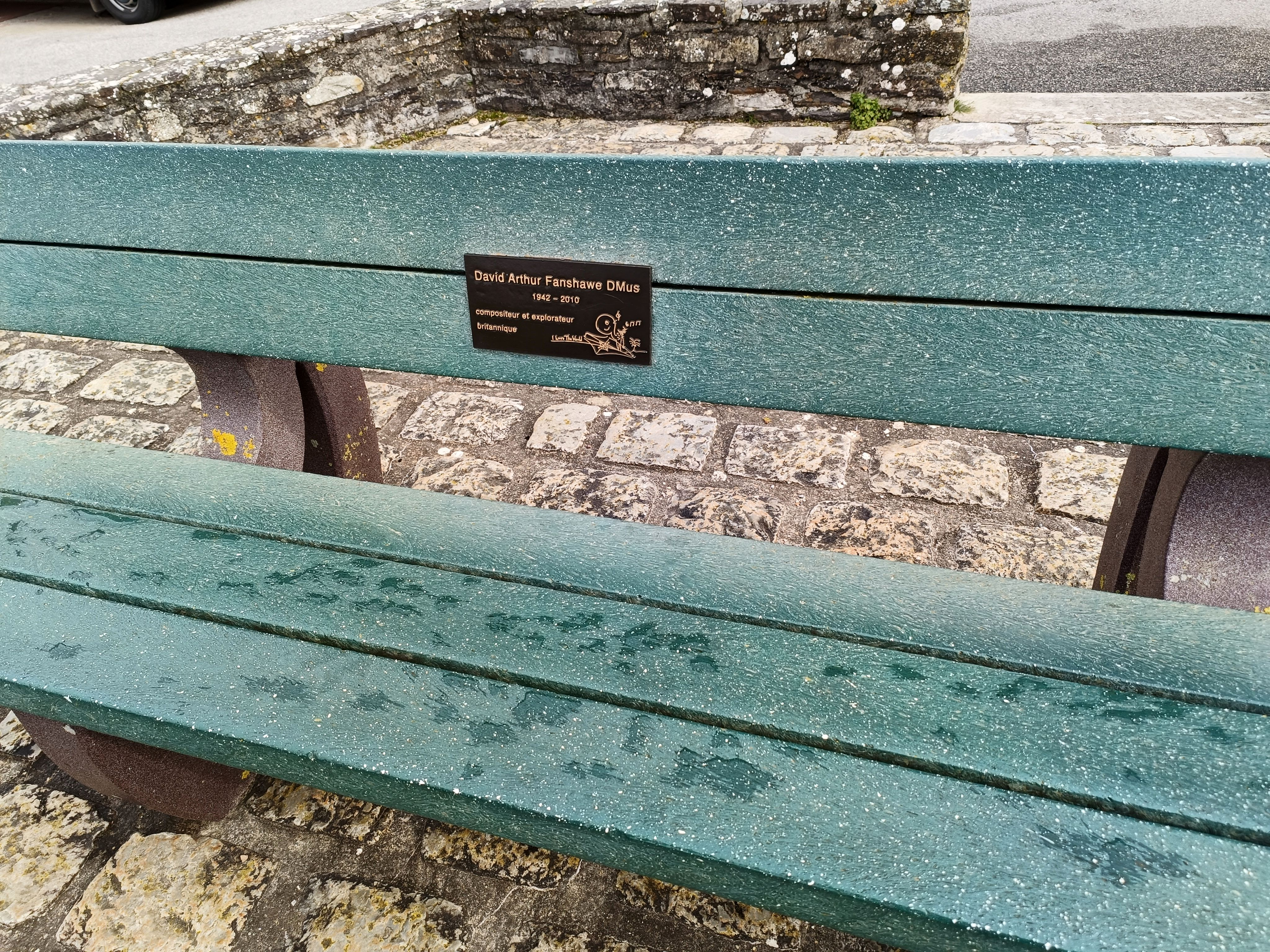

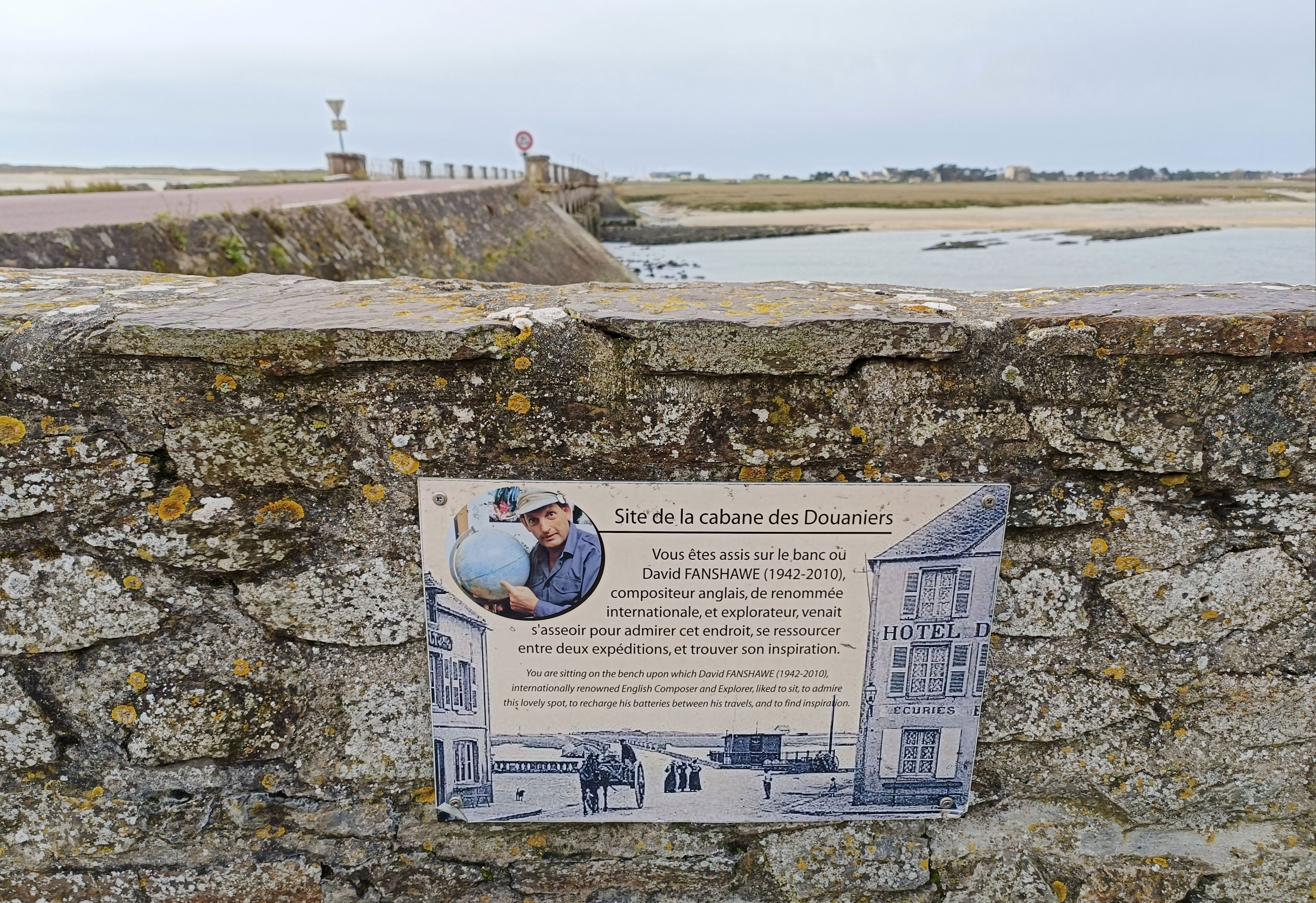

== Personal life ==
Fanshawe married Judith Croasdell Grant in 1971; they had two children together, Alexander and Rebecca. The marriage was dissolved in 1985. He married his second wife, Jane in 1985, with whom he had a daughter, Rachel. His younger brother is James, a former naval officer.

He lived near Ramsbury, Wiltshire in England. He died on 5 July 2010 from a stroke.

== Selected works ==
- African Sanctus, a work for soprano, alto, tenor and bass choir, soloists, percussion and tapes
  - from which "The Lord's Prayer" is also performed separately
- Spirit of African Sanctus (source tapes from above)
- Softly, Softly: Task Force - television theme
- The Feathered Serpent – television score
- When the Boat Comes In – television score
- Flambards – television score
- The Good Companions - television score
- Tarka the Otter - film score
- Dirty Weekend - film score
- Dona Nobis Pacem – A Hymn for World Peace
- Dover Castle
- Requiem for the Children of Aberfan
- The Awakening for cello or viola and piano
- Planet Earth – Fanfare and March
- Serenata
- Pacific Song – Chants from the Kingdom of Tonga
- Musical Mariner: Pacific Journey (from the PBS Television series Adventure)
