= A Little Princess (1973 serial) =

- Genre: Drama
- Based on: A Little Princess by Frances Hodgson Burnett
- Written by: Jeremy Paul
- Directed by: Derek Martinus
- Starring: Deborah Makepeace; Lesley Dunlop; Ruth Dunning; Alison Glennie; Catherine Lock; Margery Withers
- Composer: Dudley Simpson
- No. of series: 1
- No. of episodes: 6

Production
- Executive producer: Robert Kline
- Producer: John McRae
- Running time: 25 minutes

Original release
- Network: BBC1
- Release: 18 February – 25 March 1973

A Little Princess is a 1973 British television drama directed by Derek Martinus, based upon the 1905 novel A Little Princess by Frances Hodgson Burnett. This version is noted for being faithful to the original novel. It ran on the Sunday tea-time slot, where at the time the BBC often ran faithful adaptations of classic novels aimed at a family audience.

It was originally broadcast in six 25-minute episodes on BBC 1, from 18 February to 25 March 1973. It was also licensed for distribution by 20th Century-Fox Television, for use on ABC affiliates in the United States.

The series is not currently available but it has not been wiped or lost; it is archived at the British Film Institute.

== Cast ==
- Ruth Dunning as Miss Minchin
- Deborah Makepeace as Sara Crewe
- Gaynor Hodgson as Becky
- Margery Withers as Miss Amelia
