= K. M. Peyton =

British author (1929–2023)

K. M. Peyton MBE
- in 2014
- Born: Kathleen Wendy Herald; 2 August 1929; Birmingham, England
- Died: 19 December 2023 (aged 94)
- Education: Kingston School of Art; Manchester Art School
- Occupation: Author
- Spouse: Mike Peyton (m. 1950)
- Children: 2 daughters
- Writing career
- Genres: children's and young adults' fiction
- Notable awards: Carnegie Medal (1969); Guardian Children's Fiction Prize (1970)

Kathleen Wendy Herald Peyton (2 August 1929 – 19 December 2023), who wrote primarily as K. M. Peyton, was a British author of fiction for children and young adults in the 1960s and 1970s.

Peyton wrote more than fifty novels in the including the Ruth Hollis series, the Pennington series, and the Flambards series, the latter about the Russell family which spanned the period before and after the First World War. For the Flambards series, Peyton won both the 1969 Carnegie Medal from the Library Association and the 1970 Guardian Children's Fiction Prize, judged by a panel of British children's writers. (Note: The Guardian Prize is a once-in-a-lifetime award; previous winners are ineligible. Ordinarily it recognises one fiction book published during the preceding calendar year; exceptionally Peyton won for the Flambards trilogy completed in 1969. For that publication year, the trilogy's second book won the Carnegie Medal and its third book was a commended runner-up. Six authors not quite including Peyton have won the Carnegie Medal for their Guardian Prize-winning books.) In 1979, the Flambards trilogy was adapted by Yorkshire Television as a 13-part TV series, Flambards, starring Christine McKenna as the heroine Christina Parsons.

== Personal life and education ==
Kathleen Wendy Herald was born on 2 August 1929 in Birmingham, England. Peyton began writing when she was nine-years-old and was first published when she was fifteen. Peyton has stated that she "never decided to become a writer...[she] just was one." Growing up in London, she could not own a horse, and instead developed an obsession with them—all her early books are about young girls who have ponies. In 1950, Peyton published her first novel Sabre, the Horse from the Sea, illustrated by British artist Lionel Edwards.

Later, she attended Kingston Art School, and then Manchester Art School. It was there that she met another student, Mike Peyton, an ex-serviceman who had been a military artist and prisoner of war. He shared her love of walking in the Pennines. They married in 1950, and travelled around Europe. When they returned to Britain, Peyton completed a Teaching Diploma and taught for three years at Northampton High School.

== Career ==
As a secondary school teacher, Peyton started writing young boys' adventure stories and sold them as serials to The Scout, a magazine owned by The Scout Association. These stories were later published in full-length. During this time, she began writing under the name K.M. Peyton—the 'M' represented her husband Mike who helped create the plots of her stories. Peyton soon left her teaching career, in pursuit of becoming a full-time writer.

After the birth of her two daughters, Peyton started writing fiction novels and returned to the topic of her "first love"—ponies, horses and equestrianism. These ideas are explored in the two book series: Flambards and Ruth Hollis. Later in life, Peyton became involved in horse racing and used her own personal experiences of owning horses as further inspiration for her writing.

In association with the Oxford University Press, Peyton's novels were illustrated by artist Victor G. Ambrus in the late 1960s. Peyton was an artist herself and self-illustrated a few of her own novels as well. During the 1970s, her best-selling series Flambards was published in multiple languages, such as Italian, German, Finnish, and Swedish.

Writers who cite K.M. Peyton as an influence include Linda Newbery, whose young adult novel The Damage Done (2001, Scholastic) is dedicated "to Kathleen Peyton, who made me want to try."

== Death ==
Peyton died on 19 December 2023, at the age of 94. Peyton had two daughters, Hilary and Veronica.

== Honours and awards ==
Peyton won the Guardian Prize for the Flambards trilogy, and won the Carnegie Medal for its second book. She was also a commended runner-up for the Carnegie Medal six times in eight years during the 1960s—one of the books was the first Flambards book, another was the third Flambards book in competition with the Medal-winning second. The others were Windfall (1962), The Maplin Bird (1964), The Plan for Birdmarsh (1965), and Thunder in the Sky (1966). (Note: Today there are usually eight books on the Carnegie shortlist. According to CCSU, some runners up through 2002 were Commended (from 1954) or Highly Commended (from 1966); the Highly Commended distinction became approximately annual in 1979. There were about 160 commendations of both kinds in 49 years including six for 1962, four 1964, six 1965, four 1966 (one highly commended), four 1967, and three 1969.)

Peyton was awarded Member of the Order of the British Empire (MBE) in the 2014 New Year Honours for services to children's literature.

== Adaptations ==
The Flambards trilogy was adapted by Yorkshire Television in 1978. The TV miniseries, Flambards, starring Christine McKenna as the heroine Christina Parsons, comprised 13 episodes. The miniseries was broadcast in the UK in 1979, and eventually the US in 1980.

Peyton's The Right-Hand Man (1977), a historical novel featuring an English stagecoach driver, was adapted into a feature film. In 1985, it was shot in Australia and was later released in 1987.

A Pattern of Roses (1972) was adapted in 1983 as a TV film, introducing Helena Bonham Carter in her first screen role.

Who, Sir? Me, Sir? (1985) was adapted as a BBC TV series.

== Works ==
The bibliography of Peyton's "pony books only" by Jane Badger Books includes all nineteen series books and many "other books" (‡) listed here.

=== Flambards Series (1967–1981) ===
- Flambards (Oxford, 1967), illustrated by Victor Ambrus
- The Edge of the Cloud (Oxford, 1969), ill. Ambrus
- Flambards in Summer (Oxford, 1969), ill. Ambrus
- Flambards Divided (1981)

Peyton's extension of the trilogy followed its television adaptation and reversed the original ending.

=== Ruth Hollis Series (1968–1979) ===
- Fly-by-Night (1968), self-illustrated
- The Team (1975), self-ill.

The Pennington series continues the story of Ruth Hollis in 1971.

=== Pennington Series (1970–1979) ===
- Pennington's Seventeenth Summer (1970), later as Pennington's Last Term, self-ill.
- The Beethoven Medal (1971), a.k.a. If I Ever Marry, self-ill.
- Pennington's Heir (1973), self-ill.
- Marion's Angels (1979)

=== Jonathan Meredith Series (1977–1984) ===
- Prove Yourself a Hero (1977)
- A Midsummer Night's Death (1978)
- The Last Ditch (1984), also published as Free Rein

See also the Ruth Hollis series: Jonathan Meredith is a minor character in The Team.

=== Swallow Series (1995–1997) ===
- The Swallow Tale (1995)
- Swallow Summer (1996)
- Swallow the Star (1997)

=== Minna Series (2007–2009) ===
Set in Roman Britain.

- Minna's Quest (2007)
- No Turning Back (2008)
- Far From Home (2009)

=== Other books ===
- Grey Star, the Story of a Racehorse — at age nine, unpublished §
- Sabre: The Horse from the Sea (A & C Black, 1948) ‡, as Kathleen Herald, illus. Lionel Edwards
- The Mandrake: A Pony (Black, 1949) ‡, as Kathleen Herald, ill. Edwards
- Crab the Roan (Black, 1953) ‡, as Kathleen Herald, ill. Peter Biegel
- North to Adventure (1959)
- Stormcock Meets Trouble (1961)
- The Hard Way Home (1962)
- Windfall (1962), ill. Victor Ambrus; US title, Sea Fever
- Brownsea Silver (1964)
- The Maplin Bird (1964), ill. Ambrus
- The Plan for Birdsmarsh (1965), ill. Ambrus
- Thunder in the Sky (1966), ill. Ambrus
- A Pattern of Roses (1972), self-ill. ‡
- The Right-Hand Man (1977) ‡, ill. Ambrus
- Marion's Angels (1979), later as Falling Angels, ill. Robert Mickelwright
- Dear Fred (1981) ‡ — based on Fred Archer
- Going Home (1982)
- Who, Sir? Me, Sir? (1983) ‡
- The Last Ditch (1984) ‡
- Froggett's Revenge (1985)
- The Sound of Distant Cheering (1986) ‡
- Downhill All the Way (1988)
- Plain Jack (1988) ‡
- Darkling (1989) ‡
- Skylark (1989)
- No Roses Round the Door (1990) ‡
- Poor Badger (1990) ‡
- The Boy Who Wasn't There (1992)
- Late to Smile (1992) ‡
- Apple Won't Jump (1992)
- The Wild Boy and Queen Moon (1993) ‡
- Snowfall (1994)
- Mr Brown (1995)
- Unquiet Spirits (1997)
- The Pony That Went to Sea (1997) ‡
- Windy Webley (1997) ‡, ill. Nick Price – picture book
- Danger Offshore (1998)
- Firehead (1998)
- The Paradise Pony (1999) ‡
- The Scruffy Pony (1999) ‡
- Blind Beauty (1999) ‡
- The Pied Piper (1999)
- Horses (2000) ‡ – nonfiction
- Stealaway (2001) ‡
- Pony in the Dark (2001) ‡
- Small Gains (2003) ‡
- My Alice (2004)
- Greater Gains (2005) ‡
- Blue Skies and Gunfire (2006)
- Paradise House (2011) ‡
- All That Glitters (2014) ‡

§ By age fifteen, Kathleen Herald had written "about ten more" novels that publishers rejected with "very nice letters".

‡ Jane Badger Books lists these titles among Peyton's "pony books only" – as well as all nineteen series books listed above.
