= Czesław Marchaj =

Polish yacht racer

- Born: 9 July 1918; Słomniki, Kingdom of Poland
- Died: 21 July 2015 (aged 97); Warsaw, Poland
- Education: State Academy of Mechanical and Electrical Engineering, Warsaw
- Known for: Aerodynamic and hydrodynamic investigations of sailing yacht performance
- Scientific career
- Fields: Aerodynamics; Sailing

Czesław Antony Marchaj (9 July 1918 – 21 July 2015), often known in the West as C.A. Marchaj or Tony Marchaj, was a Polish-British yachtsman whose published scientific studies of the aerodynamics and hydrodynamics of sailing boats have been influential on yacht, sail and rig designers. He was the author of Sailing Theory and Practice and approximately 60 other publications on sailing. He was a member of the Royal Institution of Naval Architects (RINA), and he was awarded the Silver Medal of The International Sailing Federation (ISAF).

== Early life and education ==
His original youth interest and professional career choice was aviation, with emphasis on gliding. After studying at the State Academy of Mechanical and Electrical Engineering (Note: Państwowa Wyższa Szkoła Budowy Maszyn i Elektrotechniki im. H. Wawelberga i S. Rotwanda w Warszawie) in Warsaw, he joined the Warsaw University of Technology. Led wind tunnel testing of combat airplanes. During the German and Soviet occupation of Poland during World War II he was a soldier of the Polish Home Army (Armia Krajowa). Also, during the war years, Czesław Marchaj studied philosophy (clandestinely, as higher education was suppressed by occupation authorities) under Władysław Tatarkiewicz.

In the postwar years his interest had turned towards sailing. This resulted (in 1949) in a sentence in a politically motivated process to a prison term (Note: This is disputed - possibly what sources call "prison term" was a lengthy arrest under these charges. There is no dispute as to the fact of arrest.) under false charges of espionage and "trying to escape to the West" and subsequent long term harassment. (Note: Czesław Marchaj was one of the country's top Finn class competitors, but was blocked by the Polish authorities from international competitions for political reasons. He also was blocked from work in state-controlled establishments, which - under the communist system - made any research or advanced technology related work a near impossibility.)

== Career ==
In 1953, drawing on his professional background in aerodynamics, Czeslaw Marchaj designed modifications (within class rules) to his Finn class racing boat and subsequently sailed it to a surprising win in a multiday Warsaw-Gdańsk river regatta. Asked by the Warsaw sailing clubs community about his race performance, he prepared and presented a series of lectures on sail aerodynamics during 1953/54 winter off-season. These lectures had been edited into the first version of the book Sailing Theory and Practice. This work had been well received and published in Poland and abroad. (Note: Czesław Marchaj made a stand for his rights by demanding (and succeeding) royalties from a Soviet publishing house for (published with no concern to copyright, as was the Soviet practice at the time) Soviet edition of this work, not a commonly assumed attitude under communist rule.)

On the strength of Sailing Theory and Practice, in 1969, Czesław Marchaj was granted a two-year scholarship by the University of Southampton. In 1970 he decided to live in the United Kingdom (which was considered defection by the Polish authorities and resulted in a long-term separation from his family, which was barred from leaving Poland to join him). In the years 1969–1990, Czesław Marchaj continued research at the University of Southampton (Note: Unclear at what position (only graduation record from this institution regarding Czesław Marchaj is accessible, possibly a contamination in newspaper sources cited.) and was a visiting lecturer at multiple top-ranking academic institutions. At the University of Southampton he pioneered wind tunnel testing of (scaled) sailing ships His work included books Aero-Hydrodynamics of Sailing (1979), Seaworthiness: The Forgotten Factor (1986) and Sail Performance: Techniques to Maximize Sail Power (1996). In 1979, after many boats were sunk with a loss of life in the Admirals Cup regatta Fastnet race Czesław Marchaj was commissioned to investigate the problem of dynamic instability of yachts in foul weather. (Note: Analysing and pointing to dangerous compromises in seaworthiness of racing yachts.) He was also involved in the America's Cup competition bid preparations for the British team. (Note: Lionheart, 1980)

His books contain a rigorous theoretical and experimental approach to issues in the design and operation of sailing vessels, resulting in detailed analysis, confirmation or debunking of many previously assumed facts in sailing practice.

== Later life ==
In the 1990s, Czesław Marchaj moved to a rural retreat in France. He died on 21 July 2015, aged 97.

== Bibliography ==
- Sailing Theory and Practice, Adlard Coles Nautical, 1964, Library of Congress Catalogue Card Number 64-13694.
- Aero-hydrodynamics of sailing, ISBN 0-229-98652-8
- Aerodynamik und Hydrodynamik des Segelns, ISBN 3-7688-0390-2
- Sail performance: techniques to maximize sail power, ISBN 0-07-141310-3
- Seaworthiness: the forgotten factor, ISBN 0-87742-227-3
- Teoria żeglowania: aerodynamika żagla, Alma-Press, Warsaw 2004, ISBN 83-7020-269-1
- Teoria żeglowania: aerodynamika żagla, 6th edition, Alma-Press, Warsaw 2009, ISBN 978-83-7020-269-9
- Dzielność morska: zapomniany czynnik , Alma-Press, Warsaw 2002, ISBN 83-7020-291-8
