= Deborah Makepeace =

British television actress (1957–1999)

- Portrait of Deborah Makepeace, circa 1975
- Born: 1 November 1957; Buckrose, Yorkshire, England
- Died: 2 February 1999 (aged 41); Bromley, Kent, England
- Resting place: Hailsham Cemetery (Hailsham, England)
- Other names: Cynthia Meade
- Education: Elmhurst Ballet School
- Occupations: Television actress; theater actress; voiceover actress
- Years active: 1973-1995
- Known for: Sarah Crewe in A Little Princess (1973); Allison Frazier in The Chinese Puzzle (1974); Lynn Gayle in Angels (1975-1977); Princess Helena in Edward the Seventh (1975); Isabella Clay in Penmarric (1979); Claire Clairmont in Byron: A Personal Tour (1981)

Deborah Makepeace (1 November 1957 – 2 February 1999) was a British television, theatre, and voiceover actress.

== Biography ==
Prior to her acting career, she originally aspired to become a ballerina and trained at Elmhurst Ballet School in Surrey. Before to her breakout in 1973, she also auditioned for the film Nicholas and Alexandra (1971) as one of the Grand Duchesses, as well as the title role of Alice in Alice's Adventures in Wonderland (1972).

At 14, Makepeace's debut role was as Sara Crewe in the BBC television remake of A Little Princess (1973). She was selected out of over 200 girls for this part, which was originally played by Shirley Temple in 1939. The following year she landed a minor role playing the younger Janet Suzman as Florence Nightingale in the television film Miss Nightingale (1974), which was followed by the leading role in the BBC six-part children's adventure series, The Chinese Puzzle (1974).

By 1975, she was starring in bit parts and reoccurring roles in various television productions. She played Nigel Davenport’s daughter on an adaptation of the 1928 play The Apple Cart for BBC Play of the Month, which also starred a young Helen Mirren. Makepeace also landed a reoccurring role as a student nurse on the hit BBC television series, Angels. She then appeared as Princess Helena of the United Kingdom in three episodes of the Emmy and BAFTA winning ATV costume drama series, Edward the Seventh (1975). Other television credits include Just William (1977), Penmarric (1979), Byron: A Personal Tour (1981), and Sorry (1987).

She appeared in rep at Pitlochry Festival Theatre in the 1978 season. She had roles in The Tempest, While the Sun Shines and The Chalk Garden. In 1984, she received critical acclaim for her portrayal of Bianca in a stage production of The Taming of the Shrew.

Makepeace made her voice acting debut in 1993 for the English dub of the anime The Heroic Legend of Arislan as Elam. She would also provide voices for the English dub of Rumic World: Fire Tripper, where she provided the voice of Suzuko (credited as Cynthia Meade), and the English dub of Seiden RG Vega, which would ultimately be her final known credit.

She died from cancer on 2 February 1999. Her funeral services were held on Friday February 11, 1999 at South London Crematorium, and she was interred in Hailsham Cemetery in Hailsham, Wealden District, East Sussex, England.

== Filmography ==
Year	Title	Role	Notes
1973	A Little Princess	Sara Crewe	6 episodes
1974	Miss Nightingale	Florence Nightingale (as a child)	Television movie
1974	The Chinese Puzzle	Allison Frazer	6 episodes
1975	BBC Play of the Month	Princess Royal Alice	Series 10, Episode 5: The Apple Cart
1975	Edward the Seventh	Princess Helena	4 episodes
1975-76	Angels	Lynn Gale	3 episodes
1977	Just William	Peggy Barton	1 episode
1978	Jackanory Playhouse	Lilli-Tsee	1 episode
1979	Penmarric	Isabella Clay	1 episode
1981	Byron: A Personal Tour	Claire Clairmont	Television movie
1986	Rumica World: Fire Tripper	Suzuko	English dub, credited as Cynthia Meade
1987	Sorry!	Martha	1 episode
1990	Theater Night	Chorus of women from Chalics	1 episode
1990	The Heroic Legend of Arislan	Elam	Manga UK Dub, 1 episode
1992	Seiden RG Veda	Ashura	English dub

== Theatre roles ==
Year	Title	Role	Theater
1976	Equus	Jill Mason	West End National Theatre
1977	Murder Excluded	Unknown	Adeline Genne Theatre
1977	Peter Pan	Wendy Darling	West End National Theatre
1977	The Merchant of Venice	Jessica	St. George's Theatre
1978	While the Sun Shines	Lady Elizabeth Randall	Eden Court Theater/Pitlochry Festival Theatre
1978	Know Your Own Mind	Lady Belle	Pitlochry Festival Theatre
1978	The Tempest	Goddess	Pitlochry Festival Theatre
1979	The Chalk Garden	Laurel	West End National Theatre
1979	Romeo and Juliet	Juliet	St. George's Theatre
1979	The Caucasian Chalk Circle	Unknown	Pitlochry Festival Theatre
1980	A Normal Man	Unknown	Traverse Theatre Company
1982	King Lear	Cordelia	St. George's Theatre
1984	Taming of The Shrew	Bianca	St. George's Theatre
1985	Henry IV	Lady Percy	St. George's Theatre
1989	The Crucible	Elizabeth Proctor	Theatre Royal
1990-91	Twelfth Night	First Gentlewoman	The Peter Hall Company
1992-93	An Ideal Husband	Lady Basildon	Theatre Royal
