= Nigel Greaves =

English actor

Nigel Greaves (born c. 1960) is an English actor.

He has had several roles in television over the years, including a rude waiter in Tales of the Unexpected (A Man With A Fortune), his longest-running role was in The Kids from 47A. He also appeared in Coronation Street.

He played John, Duke of Berry in Kenneth Branagh's film of Henry V.

== Filmography ==
Year	Title	Role	Notes
1978	Passion Flower Hotel	Carlos	
1979	Meetings with Remarkable Men		
1985	Invitation to the Wedding	Soames	
1985	Ôdîn - Kôshi hobune stâraito	Jiro (1992)	English version, Voice, Uncredited
1989	Henry V	Duke Jean of Berri	
1999-2010	Simsala Grimm	Yoyo (voice)	52
