= World Cruising Club =

The World Cruising Club is a UK-based sailing organisation founded by Jimmy Cornell in 1986, and now run by a team from Cowes, UK, headed by Paul and Suzana Tetlow. Andrew Bishop ran the company from 1993 until the end of 2022. World Cruising Club are the organisers of several offshore cruising events, including the original event, the Atlantic Rally for Cruisers (ARC), ARC Portugal, ARC Europe and World ARC.

== World ARC ==
The World ARC begins from St. Lucia in January, circumnavigating the world in approximately 15 months. Boat numbers participating range from between 25 and 35 boats.

World ARC is open to monohulls and multihulls with a minimum LOA of 40 feet (12 m), and must carry a minimum of two crew members. The boats are also subject to thorough safety equipment checks, which are part of the reason the rally is so popular.
