= Irene Byers =

English novelist, poet and children's writer

- Born: Amy Irene Cookson; 7 June 1906; London, England
- Died: 11 February 1992 (aged 85); Surrey, England
- Occupation: Novelist
- Writing career
- Genre: Children's literature

Amy Irene Byers (née Cookson; 7 June 1906 – 11 February 1992) was an English novelist, poet and children's writer who wrote around forty books mostly published in the 1950s and 1960s.

== Life ==
Byers was born in London, the daughter of William Barry Byers, a fishmonger from York, and his wife, Amy Martin.

In her early career Byers worked as a freelance journalist specialising in interviews with famous people such as John Gielgud and Sybil Thorndike. Byers gave up her career on marriage, around 1930, to Cyril Byers, but took up writing again after her children were at school. She also wrote poems for her children during the war.

She was a regular contributor to the BBC's Woman's Hour and two of her books were serialised on Children's Hour. She also became an active member of the Croydon Writers' Circle. The circle provided support for her writing which was important as praise from her husband was rare.

== Works ==
Many of Byers' works were written for children, including books on nature study. The Tablet reviewed Byers' The Young Brevingtons (1953):

"...a very good adventure story indeed, and with an unusual theme. The Brevingtons, an essentially country family, are transplanted at short notice to a slum neighbourhood where they join their mother in a rent-free house, but their surroundings are the greatest shock to them, and so are the children who live there... The children are real, and so are the problems, and intelligent young readers will enjoy a story which for once deals with facts and not only with adventures for wishful-thinkers."

— "Books of the Week", The Tablet (2 May 1953)

Her 1954 book Tim of Tamberly Forest was broadcast as "a serial play in four episodes" on BBC radio's Children's Hour in 1955. The original novel was reviewed by The Spectator:

"...the story of a boy who runs away from being sent to sea. Trees are his passion, and he eventually achieves his ambition to work in a forest. We follow him learning his job from the monotonous hoeing of seedlings to the sudden excitement of a forest fire. A rather trite storyteller's tone of voice and some ordinary characters (a gang of toughs, a poor lonely rich girl, an artist living in a caravan) do not take all the shine from a book that is full of the fascination of growing things, and of a particular vocation minutely, enthusiastically explored."

— "Familiar Strange", The Spectator (19 November 1954)

Her book Jewel of the Jungle was broadcast on Children's Hour in July 1956.

== Bibliography ==
- The Circus, and other verses for children, illus. Donald Craig (1946)
- Our Outdoor Friends (1949-1952)
- Mystery at Barber's Reach, illus., A. E. Batchelor (1950)
- The Adventures of the Floating Flat, illus. Robert Johnston (1952)
- The First [etc.] Book of Our Outdoor Friends, illus. Constance Marshall (1952)
- The Young Brevingtons (1953)
- Tim of Tamberly Forest (1954)
- Out and about Tales, illus. Paxton Chadwick (1954)
- The Mystery of Midway Mill (1955)
- Catherine of Connors (1955)
- Adventure at Fairborough's Farm (1955)
- Adventure at Dillington Dene (1956)
- The Strange Story of Pippin Wood, illus. Mary Shillabeer (1956)
- The Sign of the Dolphin (1956)
- The Missing Masterpiece (1957)
- Jewel of the Jungle (1957)
- Adventure at the Blue Cockatoo (1958)
- Flowers for Melissa (1958)
- Kennel Maid Sally (1960)
- The Adventure road to reading, etc. (1961)
- Farm on the Fjord (1961)
- Tim returns to Tamberly (1962)
- Silka the Seal, illus. George Adamson (1962)
- Two on the Trail, illus. Joseph Acheson (1963)
- Foresters of Fourways, illus. Barry Gurbutt (1963)
- Joanna joins the Zoo, illus. Jillian Willett (1964)
- Trouble at Tamberly (1964)
- The Merediths of Mappins, illus. Victor Ambrus (1964); US edition: The Mystery at Mappins, illus. Victor Ambrus (New York: Charles Scribner's Sons, 1964)
- Magic in her Fingers, illus. Jillian Willett (1965)
- Half-day Thursday (1966)
- Foresters afield, illus. Michael Whittlesea (1966)
- Danny finds a family, illus. Sheila Bewley (1966)
- The House of the Speckled Browns, illus. Victor Ambrus (1967) ISBN 978-0-7011-0383-5 OCLC 18593535
- The stage under the cedars, illus. Michael Charlton (1969)
- Cameras on Carolyn, illus. Michael Charlton (1971)
- Timothy and Tiptoes, illus. Lynette Hemmant (1974)
- Tiptoes wins through, illus. Lynette Hemmant (1976)
- Tiptoes and the big race, illus. Lynette Hemmant (1979)
- Fox on the pavement, illus. Gabrielle Stoddart (1984)
- Rhymes and reveries (1989)
- Rhymes and remembrances (c1990)

== Translations ==
Irene Byers' books have been translated into several languages, among them Dutch, German, Italian, Portuguese and Swedish.

- Het geheim van de boerderij, transl. by A. M. van Steyn-Dingjan of Adventure at Fairborough's Farm. Utrecht [etc.]: Het Spectrum, 1957
- Penny zoekt de dader, transl. by J. Meyknecht-Grossouw. Helmond: Helmond, c. 1958
- De gevaarlijke bloem uit het oerwoud, transl. by Evelien van Amstel of Jewel of the Jungle. Utrecht [etc.]: Het Spectrum, 1958
- Bloemen voor Melissa, transl. by J. Meyknecht-Grossouw of Flowers for Melissa. Helmond: Helmond, 1960
- De rit in de nacht, transl. by E. La Haye of The Strange Story of Pippin Wood, illus. by Mary Shillabeer. Utrecht [etc.]: Het Spectrum, 1961
- Avontuur op een woonboot, transl. by A. M. van Steyn-Dingjan of The Adventure of the Floating Flat. Haarlem: De Spaarnestad; Antwerpen: Tijdschriften Uitgevers Mij, 1964
- Silka, der Seehund, transl. by Christa Laufs of Silka the Seal, illus. by Franz Josef Tripp. Stuttgart: Herold Verlag, 1969
- Jenny und lauter Tiere: Ein Mädchen im Zoo, transl. by Gisela Sieber of Joanna Joins the Zoo. Stuttgart: Herold Verlag, 1967
- Il ciondolo rapito Turin: SAIE, 1959
- Três diabretes, transl. by Fernanda Pinto Rodrigues, illus. by Victor Ambrus. Lisbon: Editorial Minerva, 1967
- Kennelflickan, transl. by Gunvor Håkansson of Kennel Maid Sally. Stockholm: Lindqvist, 1962
- Familjen på Mappins, transl. by Gunvor Håkansson. Stockholm: Lindqvist, 1965
- Juvelkuppen, transl. by Gunvor Håkansson of Two on the Trail. Stockholm: B. Wahlström, 1973
