= Atlantic Rally for Cruisers =

Sailing event

The Atlantic Rally for Cruisers (ARC) is an annual transatlantic sailing event for cruiser yachts held since 1986. It also includes a sailing competition for racers. The ARC starts at the end of November in Las Palmas de Gran Canaria and ends before Christmas at Rodney Bay, Saint Lucia, in the Caribbean.

The ARC is the largest trans-ocean sailing event in the world and regularly attracts over 200 boats of many different shapes and sizes. The route takes between 8 and 31 days aided by trade winds, and covers over 2700 nautical miles. Founded by Jimmy Cornell it is now organised by the World Cruising Club, which also arranges a World ARC.

The first race was organised in 1986 by Cruising World Magazine under the name Atlantic Race for Cruisers (ARC). Jimmy Cornell's idea was to create an amateur event and to add some zest to the long and lonely voyage across the ocean and strengthen bonds between cruising sailors. Another consideration was to increase safety and confidence by organising a passage of large number of yachts at the same time. In the first year the route started from Las Palmas and ended in Bridgetown Barbados. The number of participants was 204 yachts. The fastest monohull 62-foot Moonshadow sailed across in 14 days and 3 hours. The winner of Yachting World Trophy for first yacht to arrive in Barbados was 54-foot trimaran Running Cloud. The winner of Jimmy Cornell Trophy for best overall performance on handicap with a family crew of three (parents plus a child) was 31-foot Molla III from Finland.
