= James Lennox Kerr =

Scottish socialist author

James Lennox Kerr (1 July 1899 – 11 March 1963) was a Scottish socialist author noted for his children's stories written under the pseudonym of Peter Dawlish.

Kerr lived in Paisley until 1915, joined the Royal Navy Volunteer Reserve by claiming to be 18, then served on merchant ships until 1929. After spending some time in Australia and America he settled in Pimlico in 1930, marrying Elizabeth "Mornie" Birch of Penwith, Cornwall in 1932. She was the daughter of Samuel John "Lamorna" Birch the RA painter.

His first book, for adults, Back Door Guest, described life as a hobo in USA and Canada, and is full of social comment which was then controversial. He wrote 32 books for children, most with a nautical theme and 23 books for adults, many commenting on working class life in Scotland, America and Australia. As an author he used, in addition to his own name, the pseudonyms "Gavin Douglas" for adult books and "Peter Dawlish" for children's books after 1938.

Kerr served in World War I, on minesweepers in World War II, assisted at Omaha beach, and was mentioned in despatches.

Kerr was a self-proclaimed socialist, but he was never a member of the Communist Party. He joined and then left the Labour Party. W. H. Marwick, in his bibliography on Scottish economic history, comments on the role of Kerr in representing proletariat labourers in his novels. Kerr was survived by a son, Adam Kerr, whose reminiscences of his father were used in works by authors Austin Wormleighton and Stephen Bigger.

== Bibliography ==
=== As James Lennox Kerr ===
- 1930:Back Door Guest
- 1930:Ice
- 1932:Glenshiels
- 1935:Woman of Glenshiels (This novel is particularly noted for his portrayal of a conscientious objector in the First World War who is pressured to enlist in the British Army and is killed in France.)
- 1935:The Blackspit Smugglers (An adventure novel for boys)
- 1936:The Eye of the Earth (A story of the arctic for boys)
- 1940:The Eager Years: An Autobiography
- 1950:Wavy Navy: by some who served (about the Royal Navy Volunteer Reserve. It was edited by Kerr and David James, and includes a foreword by Lord Cunningham of Hyndhope.)
- 1953:Touching the Adventures - Of Merchantmen in the Second World War (edited by Kerr. It featured a foreword by John Masefield. Kerr uses all three of his pen names in this volume.}
- 1954:The Great Storm: being the authentic story of the loss at sea of the Princess Victoria and other vessels early in 1953
- 1957:The R.N.V.R.: A Record of Achievement (Another book about the Royal Navy Volunteer Reserve. This time it was written by Kerr and Wilfred Granville, with a foreword by G. Thistleton-Smith.)
- 1959:Wilfred Grenfell, His Life and Work (A biography of Sir Wilfred Grenfell)

=== As Peter Dawlish ===
- 1939:Captain Peg-Leg's War (These were Kerr’s first children’s books as Peter Dawlish, for Oxford University Press.)
- 1939:Peg Leg and the Fur Pirates
- 1940:Peg-Leg Sweeps the Sea
- 1940:Peg-Leg and the Invaders
- 1947:The First Tripper (A lad goes to sea on his first trip.)

The “Dauntless” Series describes the adventures of a group of five Cornish boys who restore a fishing boat, formerly a French crabber, with the help of Captain Blake. These adventures were published between 1947 and 1960. Books in the series include:

- 1947:Dauntless Finds Her Crew
- 1948:Dauntless Sails Again
- 1949:Dauntless and the Mary Baines
- 1950:Dauntless Takes Recruits
- 1952:Dauntless Sails In
- 1954:Dauntless in Danger
- 1957:Sailors All!
- 1960:Dauntless Goes Home

Other children’s books using the Peter Dawlish pseudonym include:

- 1953:The Bagodia Episode (An adventure story set in Australia)
- 1954:Young Drake of Devon
- 1955:He Went with Drake
- 1955:Way for a Sailor
- 1956:North Sea Adventure
- 1956:Martin Frobisher
- 1958:Aztec Gold
- 1959:The Race for Gowrie Bay (about sealing)
- 1962:The Boy Jacko
- 1963:The Seas of Britain (non-fiction)
- 1963:The Royal Navy (non-fiction)
- 1960:Johnno, the Deep-Sea Diver, the Life Story of Diver Johnson as told to Peter Dawlish by John Johnstone.
- 1966:Merchant Navy (non-fiction)

He also wrote adult novels as Gavin Douglas.

- 1935:Rough Passage (London:Collins) The Tall Man (New York: G P Putnam's Sons, 1936)
- 1936:The Obstinate Captain Samson (London:Collins/New York: G P Putnam's Sons, 1937)
- 1937:Captain Samson, A.B. (London:Collins)
- 1938:The Search for the Blue Sedan (London:Collins)
- 1948:A Tale of Pimlico (London:Robert Hale)
- 1949:The Scuffler (London:Robert Hale)
- 1949:Seamanship for Passengers (London: John Lehman)
- 1951:The Struggle (London:Robert Hale)
