= Mike Peyton =

British cartoonist (1921–2017)

Mike Peyton (20 January 1921 – 25 January 2017) was a British cartoonist, described by his biographer as ‘the world’s greatest yachting cartoonist’.

== Biography ==
Mike Peyton was born into a mining family in County Durham, the son of a disabled First World War veteran. Having lied about his age to join the army himself, he was seconded by the intelligence corps to draw maps of the North African desert during the Second World War. Despite escaping twice he spent most of the war in a prisoner of war camp. Freed by the advancing Soviet army, he fought alongside Russian troops as they invaded Nazi Germany from the East.

After the war Peyton worked as a freelance cartoonist for the New Scientist for 35 years, as well as contributing cartoons to a wide range of magazines, including the Church of England Times, Corsetry & Underwear, Practical Boat Owner and Yachting Monthly.

His biography, PEYTON: The World’s Greatest Yachting Cartoonist, was written by Dick Durham and published by Adlard Coles Nautical in 2010. In 2012 the Royal Cruising Club gave Peyton their award for lifetime services to yachting.

== Personal life ==
Peyton was married to bestselling author K. M. Peyton and lived in Essex.

== Selected bibliography ==
- Out of Our Depth, 2009, Adlard Coles Nautical
- Mike Peyton’s Floating Assets, 2008, Adlard Coles Nautical
- Ever Wonder Why We Do It?, 2007, Adlard Coles Nautical
- Quality Time: 50 Years of Sailing, 2005, John Wiley & Sons
- To Horse, 1980, George G Harrap and Co. Ltd.
