= African Sanctus =

Song album from David Fanshawe

Album cover from recording of African Sanctus

African Sanctus is a 1972 choral Mass and is the best-known work of British composer and collector of world musics David Fanshawe.

In African Sanctus the Latin Mass is juxtaposed with live recordings of traditional African music, which the composer had recorded himself between 1969 and 1973 during a journey up the Nile, from the Mediterranean Sea to Lake Victoria. The work consists of 13 movements and follows the journey of the composer through Africa. The recordings are from Egypt, the Sudan, Uganda and Kenya.

A key moment in the conception of African Sanctus came at the beginning of Fanshawe's 1969 journey, in Egypt. Sitting in a Christian church he heard the muezzin of a nearby mosque calling the faithful to prayer, and imagined this beautiful sound in counterpoint with Western choral harmony. Originally entitled African Revelations, African Sanctus was first performed in London by the Saltarello Choir in July 1972, and was later played on BBC Radio on United Nations Day.

On Easter Sunday 1975, a documentary about the making of the work was broadcast on BBC1's Omnibus programme. Made by composer and film-maker Herbert Chappell, this charted Fanshawe's progress recording the work in North and East Africa, and coincided with the release of the album. The two men retraced Fanshawe's original journey and tried, largely unsuccessfully, to find the musicians he had recorded on his original trip. The documentary was nominated for the 'Prix Italia'.

Following the publication of the full score in 1977, premiere performances were given in Toronto, Worcester Cathedral in 1978, and the Royal Albert Hall in 1979, which was conducted by Sir David Willcocks. The work has received over a thousand performances, from North America to the Far East, with Fanshawe himself supervising many of the performances, sometimes accompanying the work with a slideshow of the photographs of the musicians he had recorded.

In 1994 Fanshawe composed an additional movement for a new recording of the work, the "Dona Nobis Pacem – A Hymn for World Peace", which completed the "Agnus Dei". Based on this new recording, the BBC commissioned the maker of the 1975 documentary, Herbert Chappell, to make a new programme, African Sanctus Revisited.

Fanshawe's work has been criticised by some. The Telegraph noted "While other adventurers returned from distant lands with lion skins or elephant tusks, the trophies from Fanshawe's odysseys were recorded ones.

And The Washington Post observed:

The composer's efforts raised ethical questions from those who questioned whether his recordings were an aural sort of imperialism that exploited indigenous musicians.

"It's an extraordinary collection of music and images," said Carol A. Muller, a professor of ethnomusicology at the University of Pennsylvania. But .... "There is a level of complete arrogance, a kind of colonial mind-set, that you can go to Africa and make these recordings and use them at your own will."

== Movements ==
The work is composed in 13 movements and reflects geographically the composer's cross-shaped pilgrimage, from the Mediterranean to Lake Victoria, whereby 'Kyrie' represents Cairo and 'Sanctus' Northern Uganda.

- 1 African Sanctus

Acholi Bwala Dance, North Uganda

- 2 Kyrie: Call To Prayer

Muezzin from the Muhammad Ali Mosque, Cairo

- 3 Gloria: Bride of the Nile

Egyptian Wedding, Luxor Islamic Prayer School, East Sudan

- 4 Credo: Sudanese Dances

Courtship Dances, Kiata Trumpet Dance Koranic Recitations, Marra Mountains

- 5 Love Song: Piano Solo

Hadandua Cattle Boy with Bazenkop Harp Desert Bells, East Sudan

- 6 Et In Spiritum Sanctum

Frogs, Zande Refugees of South Sudan

- 7 Crucifixus: Rain Song

Dingi Dingi Dance, Rains & Thunder "Rain Song" by Latigo Oteng, Uganda

- 8 Sanctus: Bwala Dance

Bunyoro Madinda Xylophone Acholi Bwala Dance, Uganda

- 9 The Lord's Prayer

Lamentation, Lake Kyoga, Uganda The Offertory (in English)

- 10 Chants

Maasai Milking Song, Kenya Song of the River, Karamoja, Uganda Turkana Cattle Song, Luo Ritual Burial Dance, Kenya

- 11 Agnus Dei

Hadandua War Drums in the Desert, Sudan

- 12 Call To Prayer: Kyrie (Reprise)

Mu'azzin from the Muhammad Ali Mosque, Cairo

- 13 Finale & Gloria

Acholi Bwala Dance, North Uganda

- Dona Nobis Pacem (Optional)

A Hymn for World Peace (short or long version)

== Charts ==
Chart (1974)	Peak position
Australian (Kent Music Report)	71

== Certifications ==
Region	Certification	Certified units/sales
Australia (ARIA)	Gold	35,000^{^}
^{^} Shipments figures based on certification alone.

== See also ==
- Missa Luba
