= Maurice Griffiths =

British yachtsman, designer (1902–1997)

Maurice Walter Griffiths GM (22 May 1902 – 11 October 1997) was a noted yachtsman, boat designer and writer on sailing subjects. In his writing of some 19 books he focused on the creeks of the Thames Estuary and the English east coast. His books include The Magic of the Swatchways, The First of the Tide, Yachting on a Small Income, and Sixty Years a Yacht Designer. He was the editor of Yachting Monthly, the British sailing magazine, from 1927 until 1967.

== Biography ==
=== Early years ===
Maurice's family had moved from South London to Ipswich in 1903 when his father became the East of England representative for a glove manufacturer . In London they had lived opposite a railway line and Maurice's early love was trains. His first job was with an estate agent but in his spare time he wrote articles about trains for the East Anglian Daily Times and it was train travel that soon led him to Ipswich docks where he discovered boating.

He started a small yacht brokerage and in the course of this work he learnt a lot about sailing and boat building. In 1925 he published a little book called Yachting on a Small Income, which sold well on railway station platforms.

His father died suddenly leaving the family in considerable debt and the family home had to be sold. His mother Lena, and older brother Leslie, moved to the Midlands to stay with relatives. Maurice's brokerage business folded so he decided to try his luck selling yachting articles freelance in London. It was a struggle; his health was to never fully recover from this experience.

=== Editorship ===
George Bittles, the publisher of Yachting Monthly, had bought Griffiths' book at his local railway station and believed he would be the right person to edit a new magazine called Yacht Sales and Charters, basically a yacht brokerage with its own magazine. Griffiths made such a success of this that other brokers threatened to stop advertising in Yachting Monthly if the new magazine continued. That magazine was stopped but Griffiths had proven himself and was given the position of Editor of Yachting Monthly.

In 1927 he married Dulcie Kennard whom he had met while visiting the offices of yachting magazines, trying to sell his articles. She also wrote for the yachting press under the name Peter Gerard. They were divorced in 1934.

=== War years ===
As a lieutenant commander in the Royal Naval Volunteer Reserve Griffiths was awarded the George Medal for "gallantry and undaunted devotion to duty" in recognition of his work trawling for mines in the North Sea as well as deactivating parachute mines dropped on the London Docks during the Blitz and also his command of a group of divers clearing mines from the Suez Canal. Later in the war he had responsibility for the design and fitting of the explosive charges that sank 77 condemned ships off the coast of Normandy, where they formed part of the Mulberry Harbour used during D-Day and after in 1944.

He met his second wife, Marjorie, known as "Coppie" from her maiden name of Copson in December 1944 while based with the RNVR at HMS Vernon. Coppie died about nine months before her husband and there were no children from either marriage.

=== Post-War ===
After the war he returned to Yachting Monthly. The invention of marine plywood and fibreglass now enabled his boat designs to be mass-produced. The most successful were the Eventide 24, soon followed by the 26, and the Waterwitch 30. These, along with his other designs, proved to be good seaworthy craft but he was under no illusions about their aesthetic appeal, once saying: "If you ever see a barrel or box with rudder and sails, it'll be one of my designs."

A biography of Griffiths, The Magician of the Swatchways was written by Dick Durham and published in 1994.

== Bibliography ==
| Title | Year | Remarks |
|---|---|---|
| Yachting on a Small Income | 1925 | First book; a talk with the "man-in-the-street". |
| The Magic of the Swatchways | 1932 | His most successful book; the romance of the creeks and estuaries of the east coast of England. |
| Ten Small Yachts and Others | 1933 | An account of ten yachts that M.G. owned over a thirteen-year period. |
| Little Ships & Shoal Waters | 1937 | Subtitled "Designing, building and sailing shoal draught cruising yachts, with a cruise or two in both blue and sandy waters". |
| Cruising Yarns from the "Y.M." | 1938 | Edited by M.G. |
| Dempster and Son | 1938 | Novel. |
| No Southern Gentleman | 1939 | Novel. |
| The Sands of Sylt | 1945 | Subtitled "An episode of the North Sea before the War". Novel. |
| Post-war Yachting | 1945 | An introduction to the "man-in-the-city". |
| Dream Ships | 1949 | Reflecting the state of the art at the time. |
| Everyman's Yachting | 1952 | |
| The Arrow Book of Sailing | 1966 | |
| Swatchways and Little Ships | 1971 | |
| Man the Shipbuilder | 1973 | Shipbuilding history for younger audiences. |
| The First of the Tide | 1979 | Subtitled "Reminiscences of East Coast Cruising". It returns to the shoals, sandbanks, withies, swatchways and creeks of The Magic of the Swatchways. |
| The Hidden Menace | 1981 | Use of naval mines during the war. |
| Round the Cabin Table | 1985 | Subtitled "Yarns of an old cruising man". |
| Sixty Years a Yacht Designer | 1988 | |
| Sailing on a Modest Income | 1996 | An anthology of articles (1925–1927) by M.G. and his contemporaries that were first published in Yacht Sales and Charters. Edited and introduced by M.G. |

== Boat designs ==
- EVENTIDE 24 1957
- EVENTIDE 26 1957
- WATERWITCH 30 MKI 1957
- WATERWITCH 30 MKII 1959
- MEDUSA 25 1960
- GOLDEN HIND 31 1968
- BARBICAN 33 1972
- ATLANTIC CLIPPER 36 1973
- FINESSE 27 1980
