= Flambards Divided =

- First edition (publ. OUP)
- Author: K. M. Peyton
- Language: English
- Publication date: 1981

Flambards Divided (1981) is a sequel to the Flambards trilogy, written by K. M. Peyton.

== Synopsis ==
Flambards Divided continues the story of Christina, who has married Dick, following the death of her first husband, her cousin Will, during World War I. No one approves of Christina's marriage to Dick, because of his poor background, and his family's hardships. When Will's older brother, Mark, returns from the war in France, he is badly injured. Although still his arrogant old self, he is deeply resentful of Dick. Christina finds herself torn between the two and ends by doing what she never believed she would do: falling in love with Mark.

== Critical reaction ==
Many have objected to the way the fourth book reverses the ending of the original trilogy; others have praised it, often for its political reasons). Victor Watson, the editor of the Cambridge Guide to Children's Books in English, has referred to the book as, "terrific...succeeds in capturing with great subtlety and nuance K.M. Peyton’s strong sense of the past and effortlessly combining it with an entirely modern and contemporary story of young people today."

However, the events in the book do not appear in the television series, which was completed before Flambards Divided was written.
