= A Pattern of Roses =

1972 novel by K. M. Peyton

- First edition
- Author: K. M. Peyton
- Language: English
- Genre: Children's
- Publisher: Oxford University Press
- Publication date: 1972
- Publication place: United Kingdom
- Media type: Print (Hardcover)
- Pages: 132 pp
- ISBN: 0-19-271347-7
- OCLC: 595666
- LC Class: PZ7.P4483 Pat

A Pattern of Roses is a 1972 children's novel by British author K. M. Peyton, about a mystery and a ghost. It was issued in the US under the title So Once Was I in 1975, but subsequent editions have used the original title.

The novel was made into a television film in 1983. The film was the first significant on screen role for Helena Bonham Carter; the cast also included Philip Jackson and Suzanna Hamilton.

== Plot summary ==
While his parents are renovating a cottage in an English village, Tim Ingram uncovers a mystery about the 15-year-old boy who once lived in the house and died in 1910 (1914 in the movie). With the help of his friend Rebecca, Tim investigates, but finds events from the past being mirrored in his own life.
