= Fly-by-Night (Peyton novel) =

1968 novel

- First edition
- Author: K. M. Peyton
- Illustrator: K. M. Peyton
- Language: English
- Genre: Children's literature
- Publisher: Oxford University Press
- Publication date: October 1968
- Publication place: England
- Media type: Print
- Pages: 163
- ISBN: 0192712950
- OCLC: 29611

Fly-by-Night is a children's novel by K. M. Peyton originally published by Oxford University Press in October 1968.

It is about an 11-year-old girl, Ruth Hollis, who buys a pony called Fly for £40 from a dealer. The low price reflects his lack of training. She expands his name to Fly-by-Night and attempts to train him herself without much success. She then joins a pony club to learn more about horses. A rivalry develops between Ruth and another girl, Pearl, who owns a pedigree Arabian mare named Milky Way. Ruth gets help from Peter, a runaway boy with much experience with horses. Ruth and Fly-by-Night compete in the hunter trials and come in sixth.

Fidra Books is currently publishing Fly-By-Night, with the sequel, The Team, expected in the future.
