= Flambards (TV series) =

British television series

- Flambards the complete collection DVD cover
- Genre: Period drama
- Based on: Flambards by K.M. Peyton
- Screenplay by: Alan Plater; Alex Glasgow; William Humble
- Directed by: Michael Ferguson; Lawrence Gordon Clark; Leonard Lewis; Peter Duffell
- Composer: David Fanshawe
- Country of origin: United Kingdom
- Original language: English
- No. of episodes: 13

Production
- Executive producer: David Cunliffe
- Producer: Leonard Lewis
- Editors: Tudor Lloyd; Graham Shrimpton; Clive Trist; Terry Warwick
- Production company: Yorkshire Television

Original release
- Network: ITV
- Release: 25 January – 19 April 1979

Flambards is a television series of 13 episodes that was broadcast in the United Kingdom in 1979 on ITV and in the United States in 1980. The series was based on the three Flambards novels of English author K. M. Peyton.

The series is set from 1909 to 1918 (World War I is still being fought at the end) and tells how the teenage heroine, the orphaned heiress Christina Parsons (Christine McKenna), comes to live at Flambards, the impoverished Essex estate owned by her crippled and tyrannical uncle, William Russell (Edward Judd), and his two sons, Mark (Steven Grives) and Will Russell (Alan Parnaby). Other cast members included Sebastian Abineri as Dick Wright, Anton Diffring as Mr Dermott, Rosalie Williams as Mary and Frank Mills as Fowler.

Four episodes were directed by Lawrence Gordon Clark, and four others by Michael Ferguson.

On original British transmission on ITV in 1979 and on original American transmission on PBS in 1980, Flambards was cut from 13 episodes to 12 by combining the first two episodes into one. There was also added narration to the end and beginnings of the episode informing viewers of the events which had been affected by the cuts. In 1981, when Flambards was repeated on ITV in the UK, the first two episodes were broadcast in full. In the late 1980s Flambards was shown on the A&E cable network in the US in its full 13 episodes, but heavily commercial-edited.

== Synopsis ==
The story revolves around Christina Parsons, coming of age in a tumultuous era, of old and new, of horses and aeroplanes, of foxhunts, class, suffragettes, death, war, love, loss, and rebuilding new lives out of the ashes of old ones. Christina, an orphan who has lived with different female relatives since the age of 5, is summoned to live with her uncle and cousins, Mark and William, at an estate in Essex called Flambards in 1909 at the age of 16. Her crippled uncle (her mother's half-brother) William Russell is almost never referred to by his first name; she calls him Uncle Russell, perhaps to avoid confusion with her cousin, also named William Russell.

Christina is an heiress. Her cousin William speculates that Russell plans for Christina to marry his older brother Mark in order to restore Flambards to its former glory by using the money that she will inherit on her twenty-first birthday. Mark is as brutish as his father, with a great love for hunting, whereas the younger son William is terrified of horses after a hunting accident and aspires to be an early-era aviator.

Christina soon develops a love for horses and hunting. She also finds friendship with William, who challenges her ideas on class boundaries, and with the stablehand Dick, who teaches her how to ride. William and Christina eventually fall in love and run away to London from the hunt ball. Later developments lead Christina to return to Flambards during the First World War, where she takes over management of the estate and restores the farm to working order.

== Cast ==
- Christine McKenna as Christina Parsons
- Steven Grives as Mark Russell
- Alan Parnaby as William Russell
- Edward Judd as Uncle Russell
- Sebastian Abineri as Dick Wright
- Frank Mills as Fowler
- Carol Leader as Dorothy
- Rosalie Williams as Mary
- Anton Diffring as Mr. Dermot

== Episodes ==
No.	Title	Directed by	Written by	Original release date
1	"Christina"	Michael Ferguson	Alan Plater	26 January 1979
2	"The Blooding"	Lawrence Gordon Clark	Alan Plater	2 February 1979
3	"Entry to a New World"	Leonard Lewis	Alex Glasgow	9 February 1979
4	"Lady Bountiful"	Michael Ferguson	William Humble	16 February 1979
5	"Point to Point"	Lawrence Gordon Clark	Alex Glasgow	23 February 1979
6	"The Cold Light of Day"	Michael Ferguson	William Humble	2 March 1979
7	"Edge of the Cloud"	Leonard Lewis	Alan Plater	9 March 1979
8	"Flying High"	Michael Ferguson	Alex Glasgow	16 March 1979
9	"Sing No Sad Songs"	Leonard Lewis	Alan Plater	23 March 1979
10	"New Blood"	Lawrence Gordon Clark	William Humble	30 March 1979
11	"Prisoners of War"	Peter Duffell	Alex Glasgow	6 April 1979
12	"What Are Servants For?"	Lawrence Gordon Clark	William Humble	13 April 1979
13	"The Inheritance"	Peter Duffell	Alan Plater	20 April 1979

When originally transmitted in the UK on ITV in 1979 and in the US on PBS in 1980, the first two episodes of Flambards were slightly shortened and edited together to form a "feature-length" introduction to the series. Both this feature-length version and the full-length first two episodes (which were shown in 1981, when Flambards was repeated on ITV, and on A&E in the US in the late 1980s) are included on Network's DVD release.

== Musical score ==
The series's memorable score was composed by David Fanshawe, who is most famous for his 1972 composition African Sanctus. Of his score for Flambards Fanshawe later wrote,

"On April 5th, 1977, I was on my way to give a talk about my travels in Africa to the Oxfam Annual Staff Conference in Abingdon when, quite by accident, I whistled something, whistled it again, drew five lines and wrote it down. On arrival, I sought out the nearest piano, played the chord of 'A' seventh and whistled again. Just before going on stage, I completed the first phrase by writing it out backwards and indeed whistled it backwards: and that was the beginning of the music for Flambards.

A week earlier, producer Leonard Lewis had phoned me, asking if I would like to compose a score for a 13-part series he was producing for Yorkshire Television. He sent me the books of Flambards by K.M. Peyton, together with the first part adapted for television by Alan Plater. On meeting the star of Flambards, Christine McKenna, who plays Christina in the series, I was convinced that the whistle was right for the signature tune. Keith Morgan, then Head of Music at Yorkshire Television, got the message and even whistled it back. So, that was how I came to compose five hours of music based on a 3½ bar whistle!"

== Flying scenes ==
For the aerial scenes radio controlled model period aircraft were used, the shots framed so that the small size of the aircraft was concealed.
