= Victor Ambrus =

Hungarian-British illustrator (1935–2021)

Victor Ambrus FRSA
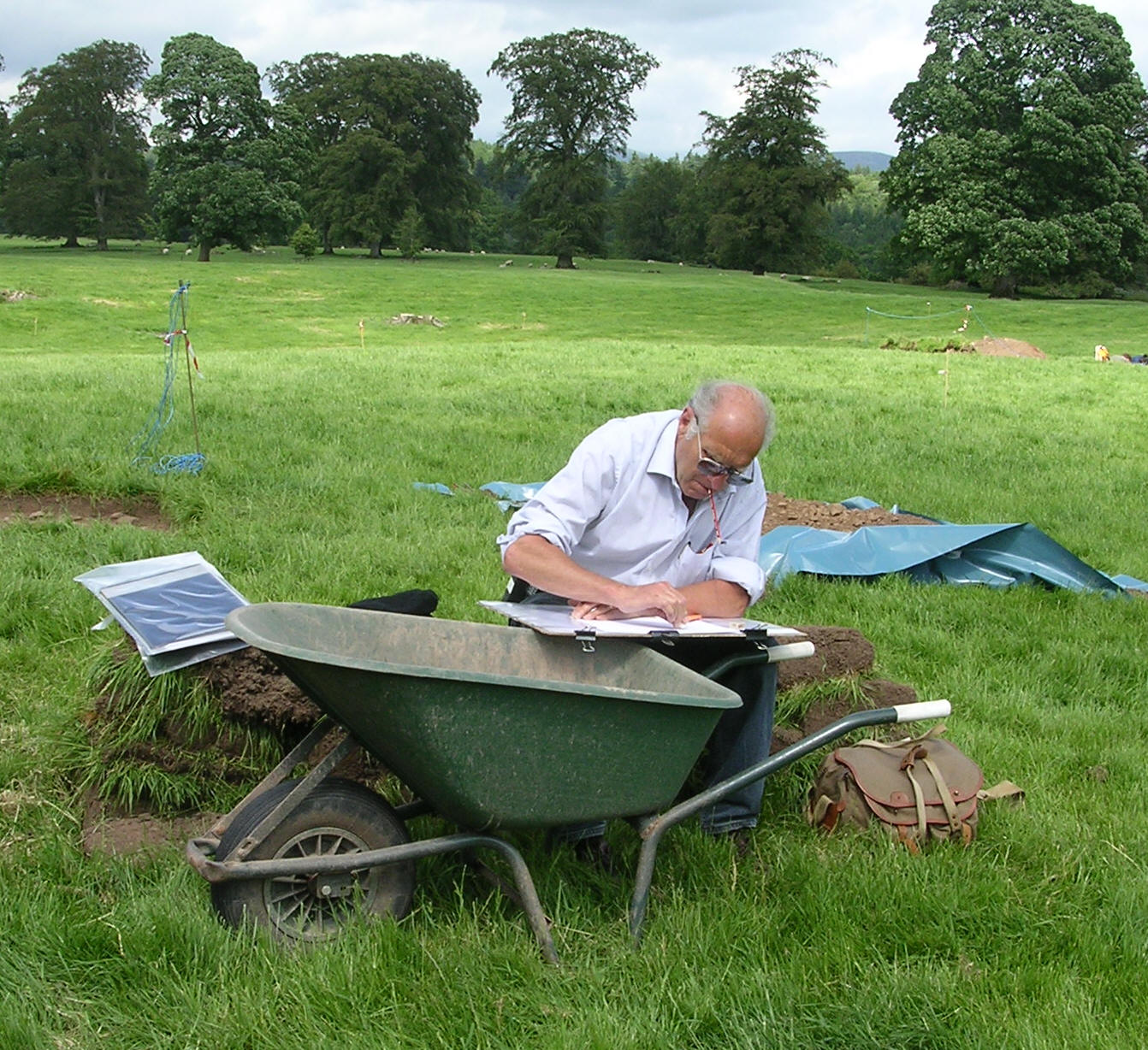
- Ambrus at work on a Time Team shoot
- Born: László Győző Ambrus; 19 August 1935; Budapest, Hungary
- Died: 10 February 2021 (aged 85)
- Known for: Illustration
- Awards: Kate Greenaway Medal; 1965; 1975

Victor Ambrus FSA FRSA (born László Győző Ambrus, 19 August 1935 – 10 February 2021) was a Hungarian-born British illustrator of history, folk tales, and animal story books. He also became known from his appearances on the Channel 4 television archaeology series Time Team, on which he visualised how sites under excavation may have once looked. Ambrus was an Associate of the Royal College of Art and a Fellow of both the Royal Society of Arts and the Royal Society of Painters, Etchers and Engravers. He was also a patron of the Association of Archaeological Illustrators and Surveyors up until its merger with the Institute for Archaeologists in 2011.

== Early life and studies ==
Recreating the Past (2001) by Victor Ambrus and Mick Aston

Ambrus was born on 19 August 1935 in Budapest, Hungary. He continued to live in the capital, but spent many childhood holidays in the country, where he learnt to draw horses. As he grew older he became an admirer of the illustrators Mihály Zichy, E. H. Shepard, Joyce Lankester Brisley, and the large historical paintings which he saw in public galleries. He received his secondary education at the St Imre Cistercian College, Budapest (1945–1953), before going on to study at the Hungarian Academy of Fine Arts for three years (1953–56), where he was given a thorough grounding in drawing, anatomy and print-making. His four-year course was interrupted by the unsuccessful 1956 Hungarian Revolution against the Soviet-backed government, during which a building that he and his fellow students held came under fire from the Soviets.

In December 1956 he and many other students fled, first to Austria, then to Britain, where he hoped to study in the tradition of illustrators such as E. H. Shepard, John Tenniel and Arthur Rackham. From Blackbushe Airport and Crookham army camp, speaking no English, Ambrus presented himself at Farnham Art School, and was taken on, not to follow any particular course but to work at his drawing. Ambrus had already concentrated largely on engraving and lithography which, as he says, was an excellent training for line illustration. After two terms his tutor and the Principal of Farnham School, recognising that Victor was ready for a higher level of study, commended him to the Royal College of Art in London. Ambrus won a Gulbenkian scholarship to study printmaking and illustration there for three years (1957–60).

== Career in art ==
Ambrus had had one book published in 1955 before he left Hungary; but in Britain his career as a book illustrator began during his final year at the Royal College, when he was commissioned by the publishers, Blackie, to illustrate A. C. Jenkins's White Horses And Black Bulls. While at college he took some samples of his work to Mabel George of the Oxford University Press. In his last year of the course, he was commissioned to illustrate a book that was reviewed in the Times Literary Supplement.

His first real job on leaving college was to work for an advertising agency. As his freelance work increased after two years he went back to Farnham and started teaching at the Art School while doing illustration part-time. He lectured from 1963 to 1985 at Farnham, Guildford and Epsom Colleges of Art. He had a long career working for the Oxford University Press. Like many illustrators, Ambrus started by doing line illustrations for novels. The children's editor at OUP, Mabel George, gave him first Hester Burton's and then K. M. Peyton's novels to illustrate. Both used his talent for drawing horses and with both he built up a happy working relationship. He has contributed to almost 300 books. Among his credits are illustrating several fairy tale compilations by Ruth Manning-Sanders, including The Glass Man and the Golden Bird: Hungarian Folk and Fairy Tales and Jonnikin and the Flying Basket: French Folk and Fairy Tales.

He worked as the artist on the television series about archaeology, Time Team. The director and producer of the series, finding 'The Story of Britain' in Reader’s Digest, had decided that Ambrus could illustrate all the subjects they were likely to present, and invited him to take part in a pilot episode of what became Time Team on Channel 4. He designed six sets of historical stamps for the Jersey Post Office and one for the Royal Mail. He was one of seven leading British illustrators whose work was shown in the exhibition, 'The World of English Picture Books', which toured Japan in 1998. A retrospective exhibition of his work, called 'The Art of Victor Ambrus', was held at the Museum of Somerset, Taunton, in 2016.

Elected

- Elected Fellow of the Royal Society of Painter Etchers (R.E. 1973)
- Fellow of the Royal Society of Arts 1977 (FRSA)
- Elected Member of The Pastel Society (P.S. 1993)
- Vice President of The Pastel Society 1995–98 (PPVPS)
- 2004–2007 Elected the Vice President of the Pastel Society
- Hon Fellow, Society of Graphic Fine Art 2010–2021 (Hon SGFA)
- He was a Fellow of both the Royal Society of Engravers and the Royal Society of Arts and an Associate of the Royal College of Art, where he earned his degree
- Elected Fellow of the Society of Antiquaries of London 2019 (FSA)

== Personal life ==
In 1958, while at the Royal College, Ambrus married fellow student Glenys R. Chapman. His wife also had a career as an illustrator of children's books. They had two sons, Mark and Sándor.

Ambrus died on 10 February 2021, at the age of 85.

== Awards ==
- 1965 Kate Greenaway Medal for British children's book illustration
- 1975 Kate Greenaway Medal

Ambrus twice received the Kate Greenaway Medal from the British Library Association, recognising the year's best children's book illustration by a British subject: the 1965 Medal for The Three Poor Tailors and the 1975 for Mishka and Horses in Battle. All three books were both written and illustrated by Ambrus and published by Oxford. He was also a commended runner up for three Medals: 1963 for both The Royal Navy by Peter Dawlish and A Time of Trial by Hester Burton; 1964 for work in general; and 1971 for The Sultan's Bath, written by himself.

- 1993, Daler Rowney Prize
- 1993, World Wildlife Fund Prize, Society of Wildlife Artists
- 1996, Royal Academy of Arts, Arts Club Drawing Prize

== Works ==
=== Writing ===
1. The Three Poor Tailors (1965) — written and illustrated by Ambrus, winner of the Kate Greenaway Medal for British children's book illustration
2. Brave Soldier Janosh (1967)
3. Hot Water For Boris (1967)
4. Little Cockerel (1968)
5. Seven Skinny Goats (1969)
6. The Sultan's Bath (Oxford, 1971) — a commended runner-up for the Greenaway Medal
7. Country Wedding (1975)
8. Horses in Battle (Oxford, 1975) — joint winner of the Greenaway Medal
9. Mishka (Oxford, 1975) — joint winner of the Greenaway Medal
10. Under The Double Edge (1979)
11. The Valiant Little Tailor (1980)
12. Dracula: Everything You Always Wanted To Know, But Were Too Afraid To Ask (1980)
13. Dracula's Bedtime Storybook: Tales To Keep You Awake at Night (1981)
14. Blackbeard (1982)
15. Grandma, Felix And Mustapha Biscuit (1982)
16. Dracula's Omnibus (1983)
17. Son of Dracula (1986)
18. Drawing Animals (with Mark Ambrus) (1989)
19. How To Draw Human Figures (1989)
20. Dracula's Late Night TV Show (1990)
21. Never Laugh at Bears: A Transylvanian Folktale (1992)
22. Count, Dracula! (1992)
23. What Time Is It, Dracula? (1992)
24. Read With Dracula ( 1993)
25. Spot Dracula (1993)
26. Ways of Drawing Hands (1994)
27. Recreating the past (with Mick Aston) (2001)
28. Drawing on Archaeology (2006)
29. Drawing Somerset's Past: an Illustrated Journey through History (with Steve Minnitt) (2018)

=== Illustration ===
Books Illustrated by Glenys and Victor Ambrus

1. A Christmas Fantasy by Carolyn Haywood (1972)
2. A Valentine Fantasy by Carolyn Haywood (1976)
3. Santa Claus Forever! by Carolyn Haywood (1983)
4. Santa Claus Takes Off (1990)
5. Santa Claus Snowed Under (1995)

Books Illustrated by Victor Ambrus

written by Hester Burton

1. Castors Away ! (1962)
2. A Time of Trial (Oxford, 1963) — a commended runner up for the Kate Greenaway Medal
3. A Seaman at the Time of Trafalgar (1963)
4. No Beat of Drum (1966)
5. In Spite of All Terror (1968)
6. Thomas (1969)
7. The Henchmens at Home (1970)
8. The Rebel (1971)
9. Riders of the Storm (1972)
10. Kate Rider (1974)
11. To Ravensrigg (1976)
12. Tim at the Fur Fort (1977)
13. A Grenville Goes To Sea (1977)
14. When The Beacons Blazed (1978)
15. Five August Days (1981)
16. The Little House by Erica Gordon (1986)

written by Jane Duncan

1. Camerons on the Hills (1963)
2. Camerons on the Train (1963)
3. Camerons at the Castle (1964)
4. Camerons Calling (1966)

written by Helen Griffiths

1. The Wild Heart (1963)
2. The Greyhound (1964)
3. The Wild Horse of Santander (1966)
4. Leon (1967)
5. Stallion of the Sands (1968)
6. Russian Blue (1973)
7. Just A Dog (1974)
8. Witch Fear (aka Mysterious Appearance of Agnes) (1975)
9. Pablo (aka Running Wild) (1977)
10. The Last Summer: Spain 1936 (1979)

written by Elyne Mitchell

1. Silver Brumby Whirlwind (1973)
2. The Colt at Taparoo (1976)
3. Son of the Whirlwind (1977)
4. The Colt From Snowy River (1980)
5. Brumby Racer (1981)
6. Light Horse to Damascus (1987)

written by K. M. Peyton

1. Windfall (1962)
2. Brownsea Silver (1964)
3. The Maplin Bird (1964)
4. The Plan For Birdsmarsh (1965)
5. Thunder in the Sky (1966)
6. Flambards (1967)
7. The Edge of the Cloud (1969)
8. Flambards in Summer (1969)
9. The Right-Hand Man (1977)

written by Rosemary Sutcliff

1. The Hound of Ulster (1963)
2. The Chief's Daughter (1967)
3. The Circlet of Oak Leaves (1968)
4. The Truce of the Games (1971)
5. Tristan And Iseult (1971)
6. The Changeling (1974)

B Written by other authors

1. Ferdinand Magellan by Ronald Welch (1955)
2. White Horses And Black Bulls by Alan Charles Jenkins (1960)
3. Master of the Elephants by R Guillot (1961)
4. The Changeling by William Mayne (1961)
5. The Prisoner of Zenda by Anthony Hope (1961)
6. Looking for Orlando by Frances Williams Brown (1961)
7. Hills And Hollows by Sheena Porter (1962)
8. The Heron Ride by Mary Treadgold (1962)
9. Barchester Towers by Anthony Trollope by Barry Taylor (1963)
10. Return to the Heron by Mary Treadgold (1963)
11. Jacob's Lader by Sheena Porter (1963)
12. The Royal Navy by Peter Dawlish (Oxford, 1963) — a commended runner up for the Kate Greenaway Medal
13. Arripay by Rosemary Manning (1963)
14. The Merediths of Mappins by Irene Byers (1964); US edition: The Mystery at Mappins (New York: Charles Scribner's Sons, 1964)
15. High And Haunted Island by Nan Chauncy (1964)
16. Deerfold by Sheena Porter (1966)
17. North of Nowhere by Barbara Sleigh (1964)
18. The British Army by Edward Fitzgerald (1964)
19. Watch for the Morning by J Oliver (1964)
20. Private Beach by Richard Parker (1964)
21. Ride A Northbound Horse by Richard Wormser (1964)
22. The Three Brothers of Ur by J G Fyson (1964)
23. Miscellany One by Edward Blishen (ed.) (1964)
24. Pasang The Sherpa by Peter Webster (1964)
25. Pineapple Palace by Robina Beckles Wilson (1964)
26. The Red King & The Witch: Gipsy Folk And Fairy Tales by Ruth Manning-Sanders (1964)
27. The Hamish Hamilton Book of Kings by Eleanor Farjeon & William Mayne (1964)
28. The Hamish Hamilton Book of Queens by Eleanor Farjeon & William Mayne (1965)
29. The Journey of the Eldest Son by J G Fyson (1965)
30. The Three Sorrowful Tales of Erin by F M Pilkington (1965)
31. The Cat That Walked A Week by M Dejong (196)
32. A Turkish Village by Gough, Mary (1965)
33. The Dog Crusoe by R M Ballantyne (1966 )
34. The Royal Air Force by John W.R. Taylor ( 1965)
35. Bilberry Summer by Maribel Edwin (1965)
36. One Is One by Barbara Leonie Picard (1965)
37. The Young Pretenders by Barbara Leonie Picard (1966)
38. The Merchant Navy by Peter Dawlish (1966)
39. The Challenge of the Green Knight by Ian Serraillier (1966)
40. Little Katia by E M Almedingen (1966)
41. The Bushbabies by William Stevenson (1966)
42. Young Mark by E M Almedingen (1967)
43. Robin in the Greenwood by Ian Serraillier (1967)
44. Prisoners in the Snow by Arthur Catherall (1967)
45. Mathinna's People by Nan Chauncy (1967)
46. A Sapphire For September by Hesba F Brimstead (1967)
47. Marthinna's People by Nan Chauncy (1967)
48. The House of the Speckled Browns by Irene Byers (1967 Oliver & Boyd)
49. Kidnapped by Accident by Arthur Catherall (1968)
50. Haki The Shetland Pony by Kathleen Fidler (1968)
51. Twice Seven Tales by Barbara Leonie Picard (1968)
52. Folk Tales From The North by Winifred Finlay (1968)
53. Robinson Crusoe by Daniel Defoe (1968 Nonesuch Press)
54. The Glass Man and the Golden Bird by Ruth Manning-Sanders (1968)
55. Folk Tales From Moor And Mountain by Winifred Finlay (1969)
56. The Mystery of Stonehenge by Franklyn Mansfield Branley (1969) — the work by Ambrus most widely held in WorldCat participating libraries
57. Red Sea Rescue by Arthur Catherall (1969)
58. Knights of God; Tales And Legends of the Irish Saints by Patricia Lynch (1969)
59. When Jays Fly To Barbmo by Margaret Balderson (1969)
60. Robin And His Merry Men by Ian Serraillier (1969)
61. Stranger in the Hills by Madeleine Polland (1969)
62. The Courage of Andy Robson by Frederick Grice (1969)
63. The Lighthouse Keeper's Son by Nan Chauncy (1969)
64. The Family on the Waterfront by Natalie Savage Carlson (1969)
65. Jonnikin and the Flying Basket by Ruth Manning-Sanders (1969)
66. The diverting history of John Gilpin by William Cowper (1969)
67. Celtic Fairy Tales by J Jacobs (1970)
68. Big Ben by David Harry Walker (1970)
69. West of Widdershins by Barbara Sleigh (1971)
70. The Traitor Within by Alexander Cordell (1971)
71. Folk tales from the West by Eileen Molony (1971)
72. How The Moon Began by J Reeves (1971)
73. Living in a Castle by R.J. Unstead (1971)
74. The Story of Britain Before The Norman Conquest by R J Unstead (1971)
75. The Story of Britain in the Middle Ages by R J Unstead And Victor G Ambrus ( 1972)
76. The story of Britain: in Tudor and Stuart Times by R J Unstead (1971)
77. The Story of Britain From William of Orange To World War II by R J Unstead (1971)
78. Claymore and Kilt: Tales from Scottish history and the Scottish ballads by Sorche Nic Leodhas (1971)
79. The Galleon by Ronald Welch (1971)
80. Tank Commander by Ronald Welch (1972)
81. Marko's Wedding by Ian Serraillier (1972)
82. Snow Lion by James Macdonald Marks (1972)
83. David in Silence by Veronica Robinson (1967)
84. Tales of Ancient Persia by Barbara Leonie Picard (1972)
85. The Stories of the Sea by Frank Knight (writer) (1973)
86. True Stories of Exploration by Frank Knight (1973)
87. The Hamish Hamilton Book of Magicians by Roger Lancelyn Green (1973)
88. Kodi's Mare by Bonnie Highsmith (1973)
89. The Golden Future by Thorstein Stefansson (1974)
90. The Spuddy by Lillian Beckwith (1974)
91. Cap O'rushes by Winifred Finlay (1974)
92. Madatan by Peter Carter (1974)
93. The Green and the White by Diana Moorhead (1974)
94. The Glass Knife by John Tully (1974)
95. True Stories of Spying by Frank Knight (1975 Benn)
96. the Hite Cat by John Tully (1975)
97. Shakespeare's Tales by Bernard Miles (1976)
98. The Farthest-Away Mountain by Lynne Reid Banks (1976)
99. Book of Magical Horses by Margaret Mayo (1976)
100. Voyage to Valhalla by Robert Swindells (1976)
101. The Hamish Hamilton Book of Other Worlds by Roger Lancelyn Green (1976)
102. Ensign Carey by Ronald Welch (1976)
103. The World of Dinosaurs by Richard Moody (1976)
104. Robin Hood by Antonia Fraser (1977)
105. Chasing The Goblins Away by Tobi Tobias (1977)
106. The Very Special Baby by R Swindells (1977)
107. Hunter of Harter Fell by Joseph Chipperfield (1977)
108. The Anatomy of Costume by R Selbie (1977)
109. The Book of Magical Cats by Margaret Mayo (1978)
110. Monkey's Perfect by Nora Rock (1978)
111. Master Deor's Apprentice by M A Wood (1979)
112. The Folk Dress of Europe by James Snowden (1979)
113. Rope around the Wind by Nora Rock (1980)
114. The Childhood of Jesus by Christopher Rawson (1981)
115. Miracles of Jesus by Christopher Rawson (1981)
116. Stories Jesus Told by Christopher Rawson (1981)
117. The Easter Story by Christopher Rawson (1981)
118. The Story of Jesus (1981) – omnibus of Miracles of Jesus, Stories Jesus Told, The Childhood of Jesus and The Easter Story (1981)
119. Tales of Arthur by James Riordan (1982)
120. Hamlyn Book of Legendary Creatures by Tom McGowen (1982)
121. Tales From The Arabian Nights by James Riordan (1982)
122. Billy Bunter of Greyfriars by Frank Richards by Charles Hamilton (1982)
123. Billy Bunter Comes For Christmas by Frank Richards by Charles Hamilton (1982)
124. Billy Bunter Does His Best by Frank Richards by Charles Hamilton (1982)
125. Billy Bunter’s Double by Frank Richards by Charles Hamilton (1982)
126. Billy Bunter’s Postal Order by Frank Richards by Charles Hamilton (1983)
127. The Legend of the Fourth Wise Man by Ronald H. Lloyd (1984)
128. The Canterbury Tales by Geoffrey Chaucer, Geraldine Mccaughrean (1984)
129. Stories of the Ballet by James Riordan (1984)
130. Robin Hood: His Life And Legend by Bernard Miles (1984)
131. The Legend of the Fourth Wise Man by R H Lloyd (1984)
132. How The First Letter Was Written by Rudyard Kipling (1985)
133. Dog Stories by James Herriott (1986)
134. Peter and the Wolf by James Riordan (1986)
135. A Christmas Carol: Pop-Up Book by Charles Dickens (1986)
136. Christmas by Susannah Bradley (1986)
137. How The Reindeer Saved Santa by Carolyn Haywood (1986)
138. An Illustrated Treasury of Myths And Legends by James Riordan, Brenda Ralph Lewis (1987)
139. King Dicky Bird and the Bossy Princess by Dorothy Edwards (1987)
140. King's Monster by Carolyn Haywood (1987)
141. Pinocchio by Carlo Collodi by James Riordan (1988)
142. The Canterbury Tales by Geoffrey Chaucer by Geraldine Mccaughrean (1988)
143. Christmas Nativity by Susanna Bradley ( 1989)
144. How The Reindeer Saved Santa by Carolyn Haywood ( 1989)
145. Shout, Whisper And Sing by Beverley Mathias ( 1989)
146. The Little House: A Jewish Folk Tale by Erica Gordon (1991)
147. Favorite Fairy Tales Told in France by Virginia Haviland ( 1994)
148. Don Quixote by Miguel De Cervantes by Michael Harrison (1995)
149. The Odyssey by Homer by Geraldine McCaughrean (1996)
150. Eric The Red by Neil Grant (1997)
151. El Cid by Geraldine Mccaughrean (1997)
152. My Life with the Indians: The Story of Mary Jemison by Robin Moore (1997)
153. The Iliad by Homer by Nick Mccarty (1997)
154. Black Beauty: The Greatest Horse Story Ever Told by Anna Sewell by Caryn Jenner (1997)
155. Moby Dick: Or, The White Whale by Herman Melville by Geraldine Mccaughrean (1997)
156. Gulliver's Travels by Jonathan Swift by James Riordan
157. The Adventures of Robin Hood Retold by John Grant (1998)
158. Shakespeare And Macbeth by Stewart Ross/Tony Karpinski (1998)
159. One, Two...Where's The Shoe? by Richard Rosenstein (1998)
160. The Wizard of Oz by L. Frank Baum by James Riordan (1999)
161. Gordon The Clever Goat by Marjorie Newman, Keith Gaines (1999)
162. Three Musketeers by Alexandre Dumas by Michael Leitch (2000)
163. The Story of Mother Teresa by Stewart Ross (2001)
164. Great Expectations by Charles Dickens by James Riordan (2002)
165. Olaudah Equiano: From Slavery To Freedom by Paul Thomas (2007)
166. A Glimpse of Eden by Evelyn Ames (2007)
167. The Celts : search for a civilization by Alice Roberts (2015)
