= Christine McKenna =

British actress (born 1951)

Christine McKenna (born 1951, Glasgow) is a British actress active during the 1970s and 1980s, best known for playing Christina in the television series Flambards.

== Early life ==
McKenna was a drama student at the Royal Scottish Academy of Music and Drama in Glasgow in the early 1970s. During her summer holidays she learned stage management and theatrical wardrobe at the Byre Theatre.

== Career ==
=== Theatre ===
McKenna appeared in productions for the National Theatre and in the West End, including in Stephen Sondheim´s A Little Night Music with Jean Simmons and Hermione Gingold, A Midsummer Night's Dream, and Great Expectations, and played Polly in The Boy Friend with Glynis Johns, Sally Bowles in Cabaret, and Moll in Moll Flanders.

McKenna was also a member of the Royal Lyceum Theatre company in Edinburgh, and with that company appeared in Kidnapped and The Prime of Miss Jean Brodie and played the Principal Girl in several traditional pantomimes.

=== Television ===
In the mid-1970s, McKenna starred as Jess in 41 episodes of the popular TV series The Kids from 47A (1973–75). She appeared in the BBC One TV production Smike (1973), a musical by Roger Holman and Simon May. Her other television credits include Georgina Hogarth in Dickens of London with Roy Dotrice (1976), Friends and Other Lovers (1981) for ITV Playhouse, and the film Mask of Murder (1985). However, she is probably best known for her starring role as "Christina" in 13 episode miniseries Flambards (1979).

In her 1981 autobiography Why Didn't They Tell The Horses?, McKenna states that when she had auditioned for the role of "Christina" in Flambards, she had never previously ridden a horse. McKenna was so determined to gain the part that she described the horse-obsessed childhood of a friend and passed it off as her own, and got the part. McKenna then had to learn to ride sidesaddle very quickly. In 1989, she appeared in a ITV Yorkshire television broadcast, celebrating the network's 21st birthday. It was 10 years since the initial release of Flambards.

== Theatre ==
Year	Title	Role	Company	Director	Notes
1972	Willie Rough	Nurse	Lyceum Theatre, Edinburgh	Bill Bryden	
1972	Kidnapped	Catriona Drummond MacGregor	Lyceum Theatre, Edinburgh	Bill Bryden	adaptation by Keith Dewhurst
