= List of Worcester Cathedral organists =

This is a list of organists at Worcester Cathedral, in the city of Worcester, England. Notable organists at Worcester have included Thomas Tomkins (from 1596), Hugh Blair (from 1895), Ivor Atkins (from 1897), David Willcocks (from 1950) and Christopher Robinson (from 1963). The present organist (from 2019) is Samuel Hudson.

== Organists ==
- 1240 Thomas the Organist*
- 1415 T. Hulet*
- 1468 Richard Grene
- 1484 John Hampton
- 1522 Daniel Boyse
- 1541 Richard Fisher
- 1569 John Golden
- 1581 Nathaniel Giles
- 1585 Robert Cotterell
- 1590 Nathaniel Patrick
- 1595 John Fido
- 1596 Thomas Tomkins
- 1649 Vacant
- 1661 Giles Tomkins
- 1662 Richard Browne
- 1664 Richard Davis
- 1686 Vaughan Richardson (Note: Vaughan Richardson deputized for the ailing Davis who officially held the post of organist until his death in 1688. Richardson was never officially in the post of organist and was not offered the position when Davis died in 1688.)
- 1688 Richard Cherington
- 1724 John Hoddinott
- 1731 William Hayes
- 1734 John Merifield
- 1747 Elias Isaac
- 1793 Thomas Pitt
- 1806 Jeremiah Clark
- 1807 William Kenge
- 1813 Charles E. J. Clarke
- 1844 William Done
- 1895 Hugh Blair
- 1897 Ivor Atkins
- 1950 David Willcocks
- 1957 Douglas Guest
- 1963 Christopher Robinson
- 1974 Donald Hunt
- 1996 Adrian Lucas
- 2012 Peter Nardone
- 2018 James Lancelot (Interim Organist)
- 2019 Samuel Hudson

1710–1745, the post of Master of the Choristers was separated from that of organist, Ralph Dean (1710–23) and William Davis (1723–45) serving as Master of the Choristers.

Source for dates 1662–1897: Atkins, Ivor (1918). The early occupants of the office of organist and master of the choristers of the Cathedral Church of Christ and the Blessèd Virgin Mary, Worcester. London: Mitchell Hughes and Clarke. pp. 70–71.

== Assistant Organists ==
- William Done 1835–1844 (afterwards organist)
- Alfred James Caldicott c.1860
- Robert Taylor 1865
- Mr. Garton 1879
- James Henry Caseley (later organist of Holy Trinity Church, Stratford-upon-Avon)
- Hugh Blair Assistant Organist 1887–1889, Organist-in-Charge 1889–1895 (afterwards organist)
- Henry Holloway 1889–1893
- George Street Chignell 1893–1896
- Frank Alfred Charles Mason 1895–1899
- Edgar Thomas Cook 1904–1909
- Alexander E. Brent Smith ?–1912
- Edgar F.Day 1912-1962
- Christopher Robinson 1962–1963 (later organist of St. George’s Chapel, Windsor Castle)
- Harry Bramma 1963–1976 (later organist of Southwark Cathedral)
- Paul Trepte 1976–1981 (later organist of Ely Cathedral)
- Adrian Partington 1981–1991 (later organist of Gloucester Cathedral)
- Raymond Johnston 1991–1998 (later organist of St Mark's Cathedral, Minneapolis, US)
- Daniel Phillips 1998–2004
- Christopher Allsop 2004 – 2018
- Nicholas Freestone 2018 –

== Assistant organists and assistant directors of music ==
- Christopher Allsop 2012 – August 2018 (later assistant director of music, King's School, Worcester, then organist, Eton College)
- Nicholas Freestone September 2018 -

== Sub-assistant organists ==
- Simon Bertram 2007 - 2008
- George Castle 2008 - 2012
- James Luxton 2012 - 2014
- Justin Miller 2014 - 2016
- Richard Cook 2017 - 2019 (later Assistant organist of St Edmundsbury Cathedral)
- Ed Jones 2019 - 2021
