= Worcester Festival Choral Society =

Choral singing in Worcester

- Choir
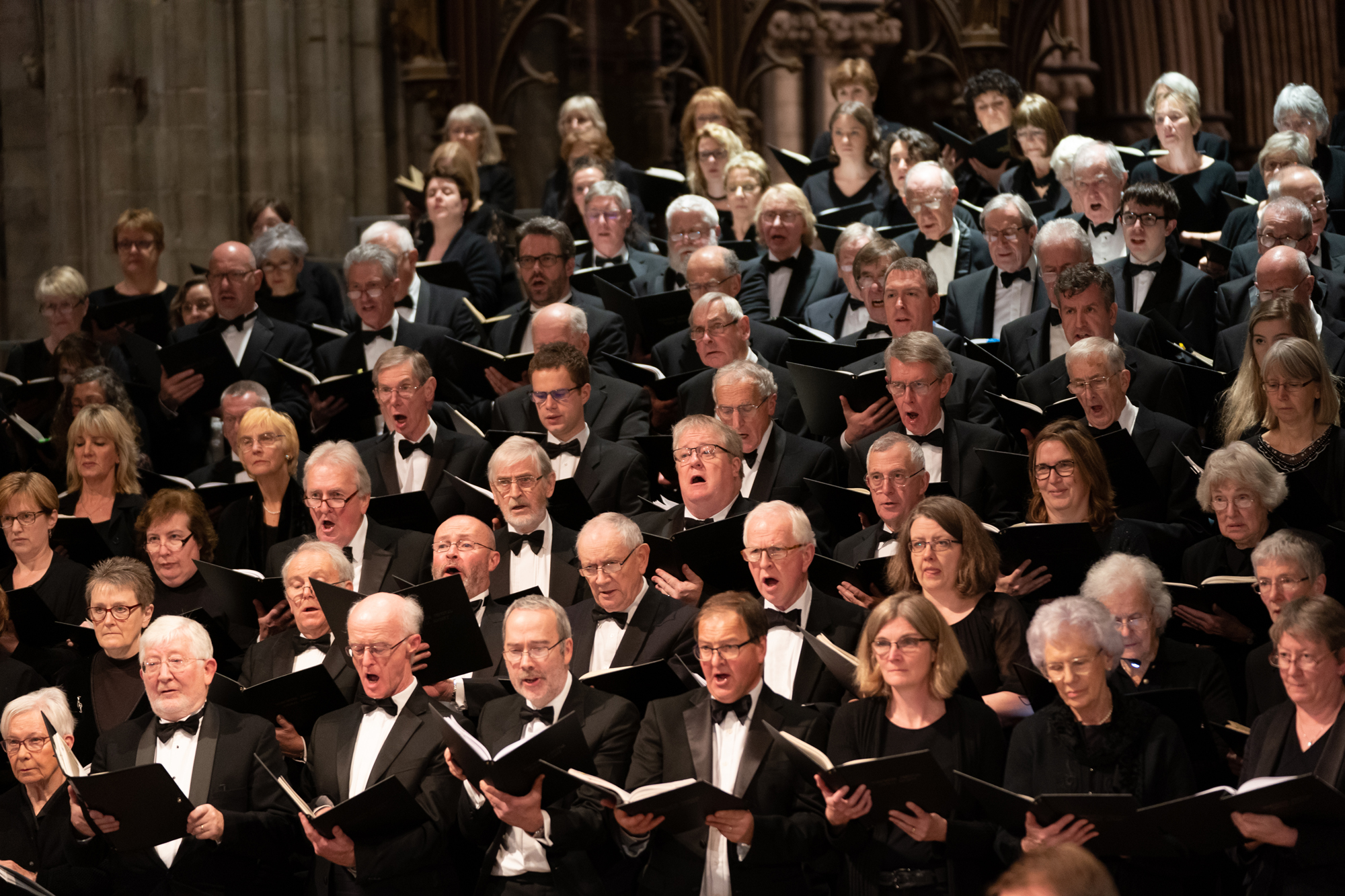
- Worcester Festival Choral Society performing Handel's Messiah, December 2019
- Origin: Worcester, England
- Founded: October 1861
- Choirmaster: Samuel Hudson
- Website: Worcester Festival Choral Society web page

Worcester Festival Choral Society (WFCS) is an independent, SATB (soprano, alto, tenor, bass) choir of around 150 amateur singers that presents classical choral concerts at Worcester Cathedral, Worcester. The conductor is Samuel Hudson (Worcester Cathedral’s Director of Music) and the accompanist is Alexander Robson (Worcester Cathedral’s Assistant Director of Music). The Chairman is Susan White. The President is The Lord Bishop of Worcester and Senior Vice President is The Dean of Worcester.

== Choir ==
Worcester Festival Choral Society was founded in 1861 and has performed classical choral music in the City of Worcester ever since. Initially staging its concerts in Worcester’s former Music Hall (later known as the Public Hall; now demolished), most of the Society’s concerts since 1930 have taken place in Worcester Cathedral. To date the Society performed more than 350 concerts. It has also staged several choral premieres, been recorded, performed in other UK cities and hosted conductors such as Sir Edward Elgar.

The Society’s current concert orchestra is the Meridian Sinfonia, which has played at WFCS concerts since 2013. Each concert is also supported by professional soloists.

== Directors of Music ==
Conductor	Years
William Done	1861 - 1868 & 1888-1889
Hugh Blair	1889 - 1897
Ivor Atkins	1897 - 1950
David Willcocks	1950 - 1957
Douglas Guest	1957 - 1963
Christopher Robinson	1963 - 1974
Donald Hunt	1975 - 1997
Adrian Lucas	1997 - 2012
Peter Nardone	2012 - 2018
Christopher Allsop	2018 - 2019
Samuel Hudson	2019 -

== History ==
Worcester Festival Choral Society was first established in 1861. Its aims were to cultivate choral music, and to provide singers to the Three Choirs Festival Chorus. These aims are still part of its objectives today.

The Society had close links with composer Sir Edward Elgar in the 1890s. At that time Elgar, who lived in Worcester, was a musician and not yet famous for composing music. Worcester Festival Choral Society had its own informal orchestral Band, and in the 1890s violinist Elgar became its leader. Several other musician members of his family also played in the WFCS Band.As Elgar’s reputation grew, WFCS performed several of his choral works at its concerts, conducted by the composer. Elgar also wrote two choral works that were given their world premiere by Worcester Festival Choral Society, which he also conducted: The Black Knight (1892) and Scenes from the Bavarian Highlands (1895) [3]. Two WFCS conductors of that era were also close friends of Edward Elgar, and have music dedicated to them: his cantata The Black Knight was dedicated to Hugh Blair; and the Third Pomp and Circumstance March (1904) was dedicated to Ivor Atkins. [4][5]. Other composers and conductors to have guest-conducted Worcester Festival Choral Society concerts over its history include Hubert Parry, Samuel Coleridge-Taylor, Walford Davies, Charles Villiers Stanford, Vernon Handley, Jonathan Willcocks and Sir Adrian Boult.

Worcester Festival Choral Society presents choral works written for SATB chorus, orchestra and soloists. Amongst the more traditional works performed are requiems, masses and oratorios by composers such as Mozart, Bach, Verdi, Haydn, Handel and Brahms. The choir also performs many late 19th/early 20th century choral pieces by composers such as Elgar, Vaughan Williams, Poulenc, Fauré and Britten; and later works by living composers including Morten Lauridsen, Jonathan Willcocks and Jonathan Dove.

In addition to its own concerts, Worcester Festival Choral Society’s appearances around the UK have included the King's Lynn festival and two Elgar Festivals at the Royal Albert Hall in the 1970s; Elgar concerts at Birmingham’s Symphony Hall with the BBC Singers and Chorus in the early 1990s; and a performance of Britten's War Requiem at Symphony Hall with the CBSO and City of Birmingham Chorus in 2004. Many of its singers also took part in a Three Choirs Festival 300th anniversary performance that was given to The Prince of Wales at Buckingham Palace in 2015. The following year, one of WFCS’s past Directors of Music, Sir David Willcocks, died. As a tribute, Worcester Festival Choral Society joined Worcester Cathedral Choir to create a music CD featuring many of the Christmas carol arrangements for which David Willcocks was famous, and it briefly entered the UK’s classical music charts.

The Society has commissioned two pieces from its conductors: A Song of Celebration composed by Dr Donald Hunt in 1995 (marking English Music Year); and Creation Canticles, by Adrian Lucas, in 2004.

For its 150th season in 2011, the Worcester Festival Choral Society performed Belshazzar’s Feast by Walton held a black tie dinner in Worcester’s Guildhall, which the four living Directors of Music (Sir David Willcocks, Dr Christopher Robinson, Dr Donald Hunt and Adrian Lucas) attended.

== Performances ==
=== Premieres ===
Date	Composer	Composition	Details
18 April 1893	Edward Elgar	The Black Knight	World Premiere conducted by the composer
4 Dec 1884	Hugh Blair	Advent Cantata	World Premiere conducted by the composer
25 Nov 1901	Horatio Parker	Come Away!	World Premiere conducted by the composer
21 April 1896	Edward Elgar	Scenes from the Bavarian Highlands	World Premiere conducted by the composer
12 Feb 1929	Alexander Brent-Smith	Choral Dances	World Premiere attended by Edward Elgar
22 March 1980	Edwin Roxburgh	The Rock	World Premiere attended by the composer
14 Oct 1995	Donald Hunt	A song of celebration	World Premiere conducted by the composer
27 March 2004	Adrian Lucas	Creation Canticles	World Premiere conducted by the composer

=== Music conducted or attended by the composer ===
Date	Composer	Composition	Details
14 April 1891	Hubert Parry	Judith	Conducted by the composer with Edward Elgar leading the orchestra
4 May 1897	Edward Elgar	Imperial March & Scenes from the Saga of King Olaf	Conducted by the composer
3 May 1900	Samuel Coleridge-Taylor	Hiawatha's Wedding Feast & The death of Minnehaha	Conducted by the composer
14 Jan 1901	Edward Elgar	Serenade for Strings	Conducted by the composer
6 Feb 1902	Henry Walford Davies	Three Jovial Huntsmen	Conducted by the composer
24 Feb 1903	Edward Elgar	Coronation Ode	Conducted by the composer
9 Nov 1904	Edward Elgar	Caractacus	Conducted by the composer
21 Feb 1905	Charles Lee Williams	Festival Hymn	Conducted by the composer
6 Dec 1905	Henry Walford Davies	Three Jovial Huntsmen	Conducted by the composer
6 Dec 1905	Hugh Blair	Trafalgar	Conducted by the composer
28 Nov 1906	Ivor Atkins	Hymn of Faith	Conducted by the composer
19 Feb 1908	Charles Villiers Stanford	Songs of the Sea	Conducted by the composer
1 Apr 1913	Edward Elgar	Serenade for Strings	Conducted by the composer
15 March 1917	Edward Elgar	For the Fallen	Helping to lead the WW1 memorial service in Worcester Cathedral in aid of the Worcester Red Cross War Depot Fund. Conducted by the composer.
13 March 1928	Edward Elgar	Dream of Gerontius	Performing Elgar's great choral work for the first time. Attended by the composer
02 Dec 1930	Edward Elgar	Serenade for Strings	Conducted by the composer
25 July 1981	David Fanshawe	African Sanctus	Performing at the King's Lynn Arts Festival attended by the composer
10 March 1993	Jonathan Willcocks	Voices of Time	Conducted by the composer. Fauré Requiem was also conducted by Sir David Willcocks
15 November 2014	Jonathan Dove	There was a Child	Attended by the composer.
18 November 2017	Jonathan Dove	For an Unknown Soldier	Attended by the composer.
16 March 2024	Richard Blackford	Mirror of Perfection	Attended by the composer.

=== Other event-related performances ===
Date	Composer	Composition	Details
26 March 1947	Edward Elgar	The Apostles	Celebrating 50 years of Sir Ivor Atkins as Organist and Choirmaster
5 June 1953	George Frideric Handel	Coronation Anthem	To honour the coronation of the Queen
14 March 1970	Edward Elgar	The Music Makers	The 'So Called' Centenary concert conducted by Sir Adrian Boult
5 May 1978	Edward Elgar	The Music Makers	Participation in the Royal Albert Hall Concert with Sir Charles Groves, Yehudi Menuhin, Paul Tortelier and the Royal Philharmonic Orchestra
16 June 1980	Edward Elgar	The Apostles	Elgar Foundation Concert at the Royal Albert Hall Concert
2 June 1981	Edward Elgar	The Music Makers	On the unveiling of the Elgar Statue in Worcester with the CBSO
24 July 1981	Edward Elgar	Dream of Gerontius	Performing at the King's Lynn festival conducted by Vernon Handley
13 Nov 2004	Benjamin Britten	War Requiem	Singing with the CBSO chorus and orchestra at Symphony Hall Birmingham. Conducted by Adrian Lucas
2 April 2011	William Walton	Belshazzar’s Feast	150th Anniversary celebration attended by 4 living conductors
19 Nov 2011	Edward Elgar	The Dream of Gerontius	150th Anniversary of the Worcester Festival Choral Society
24 Nov 2015	George Frideric Handel	Zadok the Priest	Selected members singing at Buckingham Palace with other members of the Three Choirs Festival Chorus, to celebrate the festival's tricentennial
