= Organ Sonata (Elgar) =

Sonata by Edward Elgar

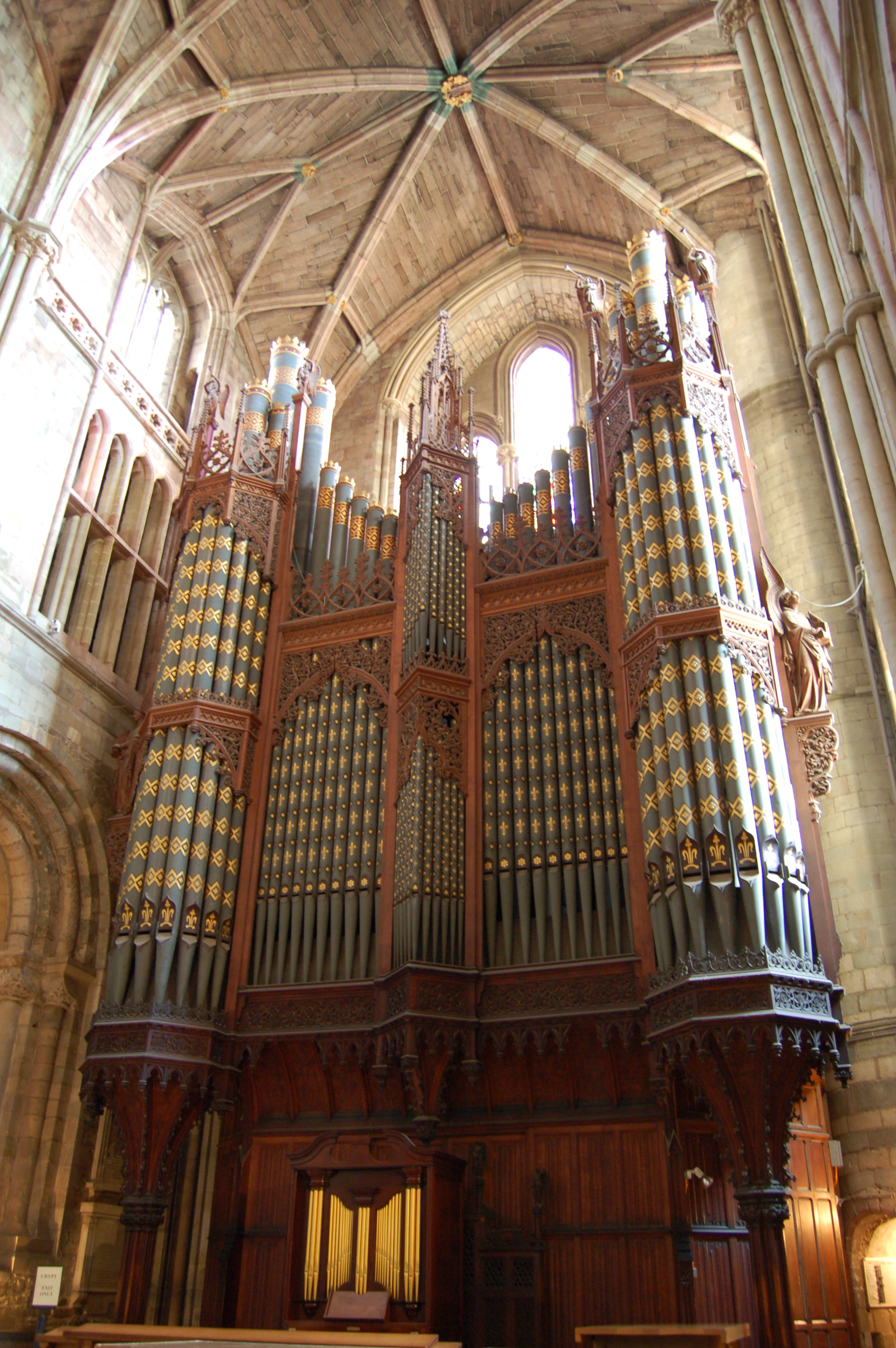
The Worcester Cathedral organ, for which the Sonata was written

The Sonata in G major, Op. 28 is Edward Elgar's only sonata composed for the organ and was first performed on 8 July 1895. It also exists in an arrangement for full orchestra made in 1946 by Gordon Jacob.

== Structure ==
The genesis of the work was a request to Elgar to write an organ voluntary for a convention of American organists in the English city of Worcester in 1895. Instead, Elgar decided on a four-movement sonata of nearly half an hour's length.

The four movements are:

1. Allegro maestoso – in G major, 3/4
2. Allegretto – in G minor, 3/4
3. Andante espressivo – in B♭ major, 2/4
4. Presto (comodo) – in G minor and G major, 3/4

The opening theme resembles the beginning of Elgar's The Black Knight, a cantata completed two years earlier and gaining acceptance when Elgar began work on the organ sonata. The outer movements follow the classic sonata form; the inner movements are in three-part A-B-A form. The second movement was the first of the four to be composed; the analyst John Butt comments that the key – G minor – represents "the tonic minor of the entire sonata" and introduces "a typical ambiguity between B major and the tonic at the outset". In the third movement Elgar reused from an earlier work, his Second Suite for Strings, a theme there named Träumerei (Dreaming). The music critic Michael Kennedy has observed that to play the finale successfully, the organist needs to be a mental and physical athlete.

Elgar wrote, "one week's work", in the score inscription, but that measures only the final constructive push. He had worked on the piece off and on for nearly three months. His biographer Jerrold Moore notes that to complete a work Elgar often depended on the stimulation of an imminent deadline. This was the first time, but not the last, that Elgar cut it so close that there was insufficient time for rehearsal, and the performance was not a success. It was given by the Worcester Cathedral organist, Hugh Blair, on 8 July 1895. The work was dedicated to Elgar's friend and fellow-musician Charles Swinnerton Heap.

== Publication and orchestration ==
Elgar's usual publishers, Novello and Co, alarmed by the difficulty of the sonata, proposed issuing the work in four separate sections. Instead Breitkopf & Hartel accepted the sonata for publication in 1895. The rights to the work were acquired in 1941, seven years after the composer's death, by British and Continental Music Agencies (BCMA) who conceived the idea of commissioning an orchestration. They contacted the BBC, whose director of music and conductor of the BBC Symphony Orchestra was Sir Adrian Boult. He suggested that BCMA might entrust the commission to the composer and teacher, Gordon Jacob. Elgar's daughter gave her approval and Boult received Jacob's completed score in 1946, and conducted its first performance on 4 June 1947.

Elgar's music was out of fashion in the years after the Second World War and the orchestrated sonata was neglected for decades thereafter, and the orchestration was presumed lost until in 1984 the organist Keith Best traced the missing score to the publishing house Fentone Music, who had taken over BCMA. The work was recorded by EMI Classics in the Philharmonic Hall, Liverpool in 1988 with the Royal Liverpool Philharmonic Orchestra conducted by Vernon Handley. The notes to that recording comment that "due to Jacob's sympathetic scoring the version may be described as Elgar's Symphony No 0". In 2007 a second recording of the orchestrated sonata was issued by Chandos Records, with the BBC National Orchestra of Wales conducted by Richard Hickox, who commented, in 1983, before the rediscovery of Jacob's score, "it’s a work I used to play and always felt that it needed an orchestra and not an organ!"

== Recordings ==
The Organ Sonata in its original form has been recorded by, among others, Jennifer Bate, Christopher Bowers-Broadbent, Carlo Curley, Harold Darke, Christopher Herrick, Donald Hunt (Note: on the organ of Worcester Cathedral, for which it was originally written) Nicolas Kynaston, James Lancelot, Thomas Murray, Simon Preston, Wolfgang Rübsam, Arturo Sacchetti, John Scott, Herbert Sumsion, Robert Quinney and Thomas Trotter.

== "2nd Organ Sonata" ==
A sonata for organ was arranged by Ivor Atkins from Elgar's Severn Suite, written as a test piece for a 1930 brass band competition.

== Notes, references and sources ==
=== Sources ===
- Anderson, Robert (2004). "Elgar and his Publishers". In Grimley, Daniel; Julian Rushton (eds.). The Cambridge Companion to Elgar. Cambridge: Cambridge University Press. ISBN 0-521-53363-5.
- Butt, John (2004). "Roman Catholicism and Being Musically English: Elgar's Church and Organ music". In Grimley, Daniel; Julian Rushton (eds.). The Cambridge Companion to Elgar. Cambridge: Cambridge University Press. ISBN 0-521-53363-5.
- Kennedy, Michael (1987). Portrait of Elgar (Third ed.). Oxford University Press. pp. 58, 342. ISBN 0-19-284017-7.
- Kent, Christopher (2004). "Magic by Mosaic: Some Aspects of Elgar's Compositional Methods". In Grimley, Daniel; Julian Rushton (eds.). The Cambridge Companion to Elgar. Cambridge: Cambridge University Press. ISBN 0-521-53363-5.
- Moore, Jerrold Northrop (1984). Edward Elgar: A Creative Life. Oxford University Press. ISBN 0-19-315447-1.
