= David Price (musician) =

British choral conductor & organist (born 1969)

David John Chandler Price (born 1969) is a British choral conductor and organist.

== Early life and education ==
Price was a chorister at Bath Abbey and played the organ for services at Christ Church, Bath, before moving to London to study music at Trinity College of Music, graduating in 1991. He was also organ scholar at Croydon Parish Church. During his last year at Trinity, he was organ scholar at Rochester Cathedral under Barry Ferguson. Upon graduating, he became assistant organist at Ely Cathedral, succeeding Jeremy Filsell (who had been appointed Director of Music at St Luke's Church, Chelsea).

== Career ==
=== Ely ===
Price started at Ely Cathedral in September 1991 under Paul Trepte. A recording of Amner's choral music is among four CDs recorded while Price was at Ely. He also helped to re-establish and direct the Ely Consort in 1994. He was appointed Organist and Master of the Choristers at Portsmouth Cathedral in 1996, following Adrian Lucas's appointment at Worcester Cathedral.

=== Portsmouth ===
Price's tenure has seen a number of major changes to the Music Department: the number of sung services has been increased, a girls' choir was established in 2006, and a gap year scheme for choral scholars has been introduced, in partnership with The Portsmouth Grammar School. Price has also overseen the installation of the West Great organ in 2001 and a chamber organ in 2007. In addition, the choir have moved from the Song School in the north cloister of the cathedral to a new suite in Cathedral House opposite. In 2017, a major refurbishment was undertaken on the cathedral organ, including the addition of a set of West End en chamade trumpets.

During his tenth year in Portsmouth in 2007, Price was awarded an honorary doctorate in music by the University of Portsmouth in recognition of his contribution to the musical life of the city, which has included not only work in the daily cathedral services, but also special civic and national events, university graduations and the Portsmouth Festivities.

Price was made an honorary fellow of the Academy of Saint Cecilia for his contribution to the performance of early music through his work at Portsmouth. In 2013, he was elected an Honorary Fellow of the Guild of Church Musicians. and in 2021 he was made a Fellow of The Royal School of Church Music.

- July 2024: Led the “Choir Church” community initiative for the Portsmouth diocese, providing choral singing workshops to local groups and schools
- December 2024: Directed Portsmouth Cathedral Choir for BBC Music Magazine Christmas edition featured choir and carol album.
- June 6 2025: Gave a featured Organ Concert at Portsmouth Cathedral as part of its annual recital series
- June 21 2024: Performed in the Summer Organ Recitals series at Portsmouth Cathedral, showcasing the newly refurbished West End en chamade trumpets

== Personal life ==
Price is the son-in-law of the late Kenneth Stevenson, a former Bishop of Portsmouth, and is married to Katharine "Kitty" Price.

== Discography ==
- 2018 - Te Deum Laudamus The Nicholson Organ in Portsmouth Cathedral Part 2
- 2018 - Verbum caro factum est with Portsmouth Cathedral Choir
- 2015 – James Dunlop: Ascension, with Alice Burn (Northumbrian smallpipe), Portsmouth Cathedral Choir and Cantate, for Riverwood Air
- 2014 – Plainsong: The Echo Of Angels, with Oliver Hancock (organ), William Wallace (organ), Anna Wynne (harp), Portsmouth Cathedral Choir and Cantate, for Convivium Records
- 2013 – The Choral Music of June Clark: To Sing Thy Love, with William Drakett (organ and piano), Portsmouth Cathedral Choir and Cantate, for Convivium Records
- 2012 – Baltic Exchange: Music For Seafarers, with Marcus Wibberley (organ), Portsmouth Cathedral Choir, Cantate and the Convivium Singers, for Convivium Records
- 2010 – In Your Image: Carols For Christmastide, with Marcus Wibberley (organ) and Portsmouth Cathedral Choir, for Convivium Records
- 2009 – Valete in Pace, with Andrew Parrott, Mark le Brocq (tenor), Britten Sinfonia, Portsmouth Cathedral Choir and the Choir of Clare College Cambridge, for Smudged Discs
- 2009 – Sing to the Lord, with Andrew Cleary, Marcus Wibberley (organ), Portsmouth Cathedral Choir and Cantate, for Convivium Records
- 2004 – Portsmouth Remembers, with Anthony Froggatt, David Thorne (organ), Rosemary Field (organ) and Portsmouth Cathedral Choir, for Guild Music
- 2001 – The Nicholson organs in Portsmouth Cathedral, for Herald AV Publications
- 2000 – I look from afar: A Sequence for Christmas, with Rosemary Field (organ) and Portsmouth Cathedral Choir, for Herald AV Publications
- 1999 – The State Funeral of Horatio, Lord Viscount Nelson, K.B., with David Thorne (organ) and Portsmouth Cathedral Choir, for Herald AV Publications
- 1998 – Magnificat & Nunc Dimittis Vol 14, with Paul Trepte and Ely Cathedral Choir, for Priory Records
- 1997 – Lord of all hopefulness: Hymns from Portsmouth Cathedral, with David Thorne (organ) and Portsmouth Cathedral Choir, for Herald AV Publications
- 1995 – Cathedral Music by Amner, with Paul Trepte and Ely Cathedral Choir, for Hyperion Records
- 1995 – Carols From Many Lands, with Paul Trepte and Ely Cathedral Choir, for Priory Records
- 1993 – "Praise the Lord O my Soul": Psalms of David Vol 8, with Paul Trepte and Ely Cathedral Choir, for Priory Records

Cultural offices
Preceded by Jeremy Filsell	Assistant Organist of Ely Cathedral; 1991-1996	Succeeded by Sean Farrell
Preceded by Adrian Lucas	Organist and Master of the Choristers of Portsmouth Cathedral; 1996-	Succeeded by Incumbent
