= The Really Big Chorus =

The Really Big Chorus (TRBC) is Britain's largest choral society, made up of singers from hundreds of different choirs all over the UK as well as thousands of individuals. It was founded by Don Monro, an Electrical Engineering lecturer (and clarinettist) at Imperial College, just opposite the Royal Albert Hall.

The Really Big Chorus gathers three times a year at the Royal Albert Hall. The flagship event is Messiah from Scratch that attracts over 3,000 singers, and there are also weekends in European cities and leisurely cruises. Any singer can take part and there are no auditions, but singers are expected to learn the music in advance.

The first concert was Messiah from Scratch, performed at the Royal Albert Hall in 1974. The conductor was Gavin Park. In 1979, the fifth anniversary of Messiah from Scratch, Park's research took him on sabbatical to the USA. David Willcocks was approached and agreed to conduct.

Park gracefully deferred and played cello in the orchestra until his early death from cancer. From this point Messiah from Scratch became an event organised primarily for the benefit of choral singers, and the roster of works performed at the Royal Albert Hall grew. By the end of the 1990s, Requiems by Brahms, Mozart, Fauré and Verdi were taking their place alongside performances of Orff's Carmina Burana, Elgar's Dream of Gerontius and Vivaldi's Gloria.

In 1993, following David Willcocks' advice, Don Monro decided to lift the standard of performances even further by employing a professional orchestra. The English Festival Orchestra (founded by Trevor Ford) was already known to Sir David through its work with the Leith Hill Musical Festival of which Sir David was the president.

At a summer event in 1999, The Really Big Chorus gave the first performances of Sing!, a new composition by Sir David, a choral setting of his own words to Widor's Toccata, which was played on the Royal Albert Hall organ by Jane Watts, with additional material for the orchestra. The concert marked Sir David's 50th performance with TRBC.

In May 2010, a Scratch Celebration Concert for Sir David Willcocks was held as he conducted his final concert for The Really Big Chorus. Guest speaker was Brian Kay and special guests were the Choir of Kings' College Cambridge, conducted by Stephen Cleobury.

The Really Big Chorus first worked with Brian Kay in July 2005, in a performance of Carmina Burana. In November 2010, he conducted his first Messiah from Scratch. Kay has now been appointed principal conductor.

In July 2010 TRBC singers performed the world premiere of Karl Jenkins' Gloria, a work commissioned by The Really Big Chorus. His work The Armed Man had been performed at the Royal Albert Hall by TRBC in July 2008. On 11 September 2011, Karl conducted TRBC singers in a memorial concert of The Armed Man at the Avery Fisher Hall (part of the Lincoln Center), New York. A second commission from Karl Jenkins, Gods of Olympus, inspired by the 2012 Summer Olympics in London, had its first performance at the Royal Albert Hall in July 2012.

2014 was the 40th anniversary of The Really Big Chorus, and another choral work was commissioned, this time from the composer Jonathan Willcocks (son of Sir David, mentioned above). The work, entitled In Praise of Singing (for soprano and baritone soloists, chorus and symphony orchestra) was commissioned by Don Monro and will receive its first performance on 13 July 2014. Sadly, Don Monro will not hear it, as he died on 25 May 2014 after a year-long battle with cancer.
