= Lucy Armstrong =

British composer (born 1991)

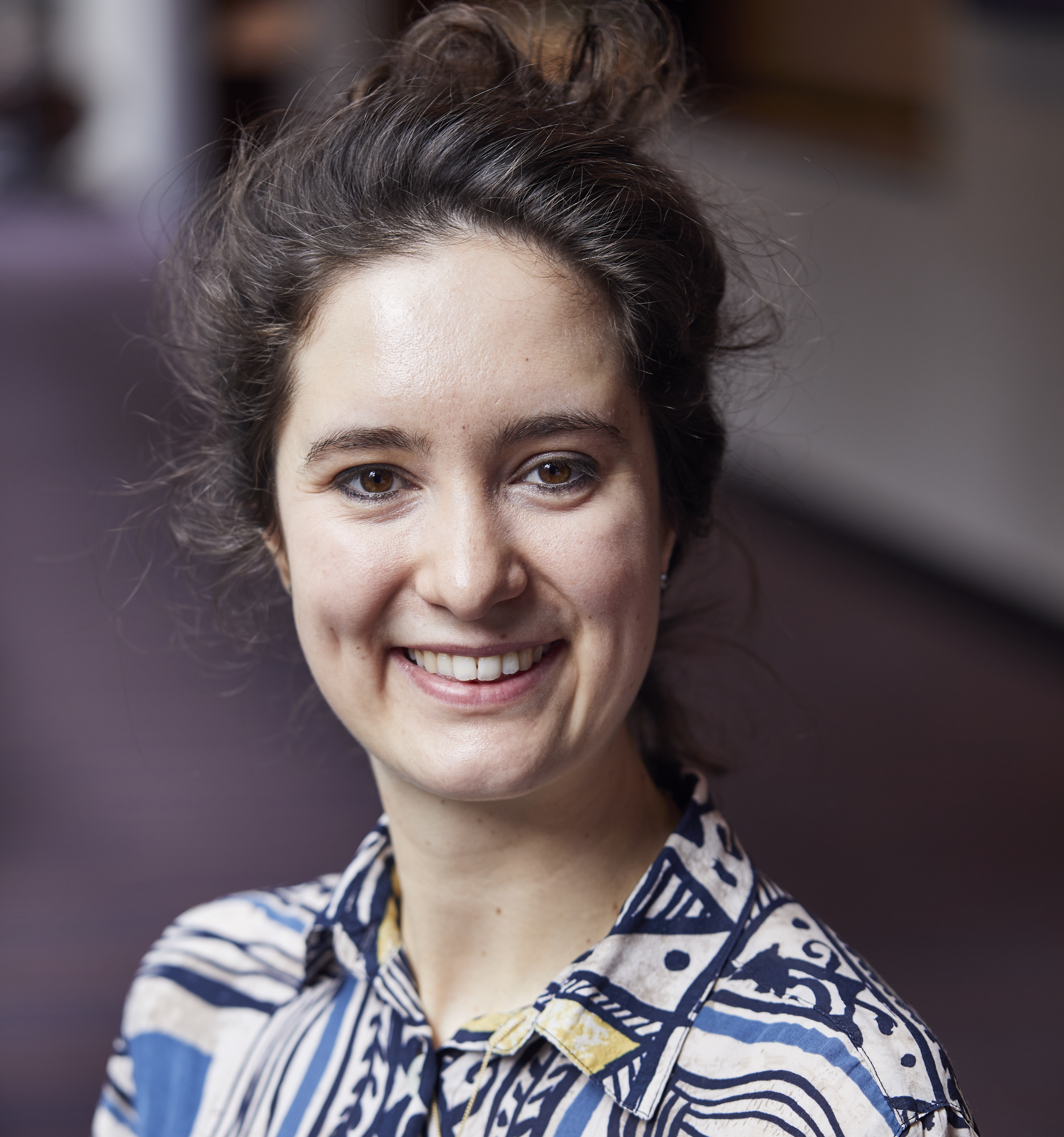
- Born: September 2, 1991 (age 34)
- Education: University of Bristol, Royal Northern College of Music
- Occupation: Composer

Lucy Armstrong (born 2 September 1991) is a British composer based in London, who was appointed Fellow of Composition at the Guildhall School of Music and Drama, London in 2018. She is currently doing a three year residency at Glydnebourne.

Armstrong composed a chamber opera, Nadja's Song, for the Bergen National Opera which premiered in Bergen and was later performed at the Tête à Tête Opera Festival in London and in Bogotá.

In 2022, Salford Choral Society and The Piccadilly Symphony orchestra premiered a 25 minute work for chorus and orchestra by Armstrong and Rebecca Hurst. In 2023, The Cambridge Philharmonic and chorus commissioned a piece which was premiered in March 2023.

Conductor Chloé van Soeterstède and The Arch Sinfonia commissioned a 20 minute saxophone concerto which was premiered with Gillian Blair playing alto saxophone in June 2023.

She has composed for: Psappha, London Sinfonietta, Glyndebourne, Grange Park Opera, Fontana Mix (Italy) Size Zero Opera, The Borealis Saxophone Quartet, RNCM Engage, The Royal Central School of Speech and Drama, The Meon Valley Orchestra, John Miller's Brazmataz, Gillian Blair, Erin Royer and A4 Brass. Her work has been performed in venues such as St Martin-in-the-Fields, The Lyric Theatre, The Bridgewater Hall, RADA Studios and St James Piccadilly and her music has been broadcast on BBC Radio 3.

Armstrong was a Royal Philharmonic Society composer in 2021, where she wrote a piece for horn and piano for Wigmore Hall.

== Education ==
Armstrong studied music at The University of Bristol. She then studied composition at the Royal Northern College of Music under Adam Gorb and Gary Carpenter between 2013 and 2015 where she was awarded the Alan Rawsthorne Prize for Composition in 2015 and was highly commended in the RNCM Gold Medal competition. In 2017 and 2018 she then studied at the Guildhall School of Music and Drama with Julian Philips.

== Selected works ==
=== Opera ===
Gods of the Game (written with Julian Philips, Aran O'Grady, Abel Esbenshade and Blasio Kavuma) (2022; opera)

A Risk of Lobsters (2018; Chamber Opera)

Tale of the Tell-Tale Tail (2017; Chamber Opera)

Nadja's Song (2015; Chamber Opera)

The Library (2014; Chamber Opera)

=== Choir and Orchestra ===
The Alchemical Kitchen (2023; Chorus and Symphony Orchestra)

The Gardener (2022; Chorus and Chamber Orchestra)

=== Orchestra ===
Saxophone Concerto (2023; alto saxophone and chamber orchestra)

=== Wind band ===
Life is a Daring Adventure or Nothing (2015; Wind Band)

Marine Overture (2012; Wind Band)

=== Chamber music ===
Dynamic Corpse (2022; flute, Bass Clarinet, piano, electric guitar, violin, viola and cello)

The Executioner's Pond (2019; clarinet/ bass clarinet, piano, percussion, violin, cello and double bass)

The Whale's Cabaret (2022; horn/piano)

The Other Dust (2016; alto saxophone, tenor saxophone and piano)

The Singing Fish (2016; alto saxophone and piano)

Space Adventure (2015; percussion and loop pedal)

SAME SAME BUT DIFFERENT (2016; Saxophone Quartet)

Attraction (2015; solo piano)

DARTH MAHLER (2015; solo trumpet)

Melodrama for Saxophone and Piano (2014; soprano saxophone and piano)

=== Vocal music ===
Masculine/Feminine (2015; baritone and piano)

Cheese! (2015, Vocal Octet)

Interior (2014; mezzo-soprano and piano)
