= Ivor Atkins =

British musician (1869–1953)

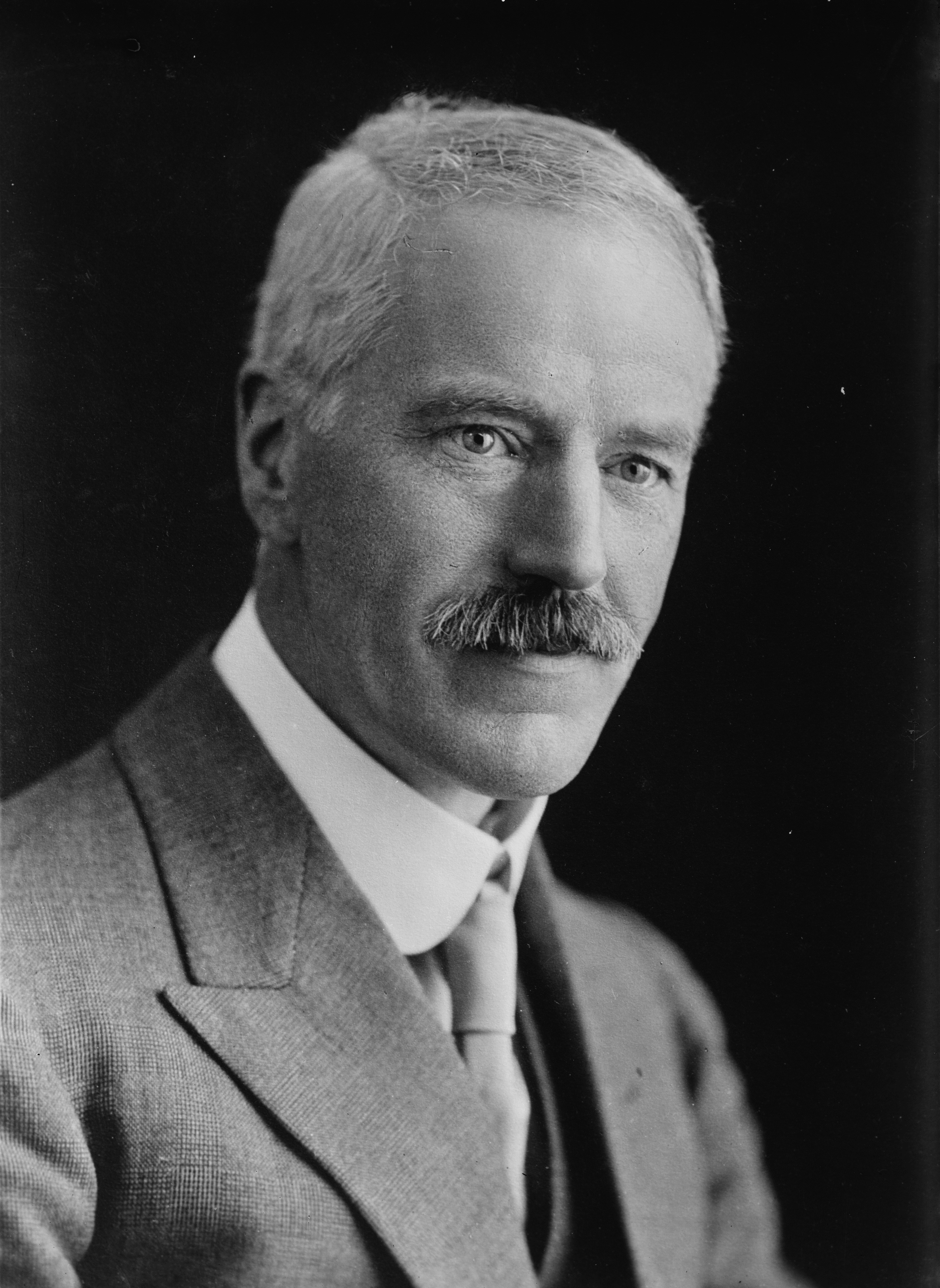
Sir Ivor Atkins

Sir Ivor Algernon Atkins (29 November 1869 – 26 November 1953) was the choirmaster and organist at Worcester Cathedral from 1897 to 1950, and a friend of and collaborator with Edward Elgar. He is remembered for editing Allegri's Miserere with the famous top-C part for the treble. He is also well known for "The Three Kings", an arrangement of a song by Peter Cornelius. Atkins was also a composer of songs, church music, service settings and anthems.

== Life and career ==
Born into a Welsh musical family at Llandaff, Atkins graduated with a bachelor of music degree from The Queen's College, Oxford in 1892, and subsequently obtained a Doctorate in Music (Oxford). He was assistant organist of Hereford Cathedral (1890-1893) and organist of St Laurence Church, Ludlow from 1893 to 1897. He directed the triennial Three Choirs Festival from his appointment at Worcester in 1897 through until 1948 (acting as conductor for 12 of them), and he succeeded in the difficult task of reviving the Festival in 1920 after a suspension of six years.

Ivor Atkins’ students included composer Florence Margaret Spencer Palmer and the blind pianist and composer Alec Templeton. He was knighted in 1921 for services to music and was President of the Royal College of Organists from 1935 to 1936.

== Work with Elgar ==
With his friend Edward Elgar he prepared what quickly became the standard edition of Bach's St. Matthew Passion. In 1904 Elgar dedicated the third of his Pomp and Circumstance Marches to him. Atkins also collaborated with Elgar on the cantata Hymn of Faith, which Atkins composed for the 1905 Three Choirs Festival in Worcester. Elgar prepared the text for him from the scriptures and took a great interest in its composition. It was revived in October 1995 at Worcester Cathedral and played by the BBC Philharmonic Orchestra and the Worcester Festival Choral Society, conducted by Donald Hunt. A BBC recording exists. And it was Atkins who later suggested that Elgar's Severn Suite—produced in 1930 as a brass band competition piece, and arranged for orchestra in 1932—should be transcribed for organ; Elgar suggested that Atkins do the arrangement himself. The resulting work—on which Elgar and Atkins worked together—was completed in 1932 and published as Elgar's 'Second Organ Sonata'.

== Composer and editor ==
As well as Hymn of Faith his original compositions included a Magnificat and Nunc dimittis in G (which has been recorded by the Choir of Worcester Cathedral), the anthem If Ye then be Risen with Christ (published Novello, 1904), the Chorale Prelude on the tune 'Worcester' (published 1924) and songs such as The Shepherdess, The Years at the Spring, and Elleen, in Victorian ballad style.

Atkins based his English edition of Allegri's Miserere, with the famous "top C" in the second-half of the 4-voice falsobordone, on an earlier edition published by William Smyth Rockstro in 1880. But it was the Atkins edition in 1951, and a subsequent recording by the Choir of King's College Cambridge, that led to it becoming one of the most popular a cappella choral works performed. Allegri's original is very different from this received version.

His arrangement of Three Kings by Peter Cornelius for solo voice and choir, published posthumously in 1957, also achieved great popularity as a choral work for Epiphany. It was included in the first volume of the popular 1961 collection compiled by David Willcocks and Reginald Jacques, Carols for Choirs.

== Personal life ==
Atkins married Katherine Butler in 1899. Katherine became Mayor of Worcester in 1937. She died in 1954. Their ashes were interred in Worcester Cathedral. Their son, Edward Wulstan Ivor Atkins (1904-2003) was an engineer and writer. He was Elgar's godson and wrote The Elgar/Atkins Friendship in 1984.

Cultural offices
Preceded by Hugh Blair	Organist and Master of the Choristers of Worcester Cathedral; 1897-1950	Succeeded by David Willcocks
