= Marcus Wibberley =

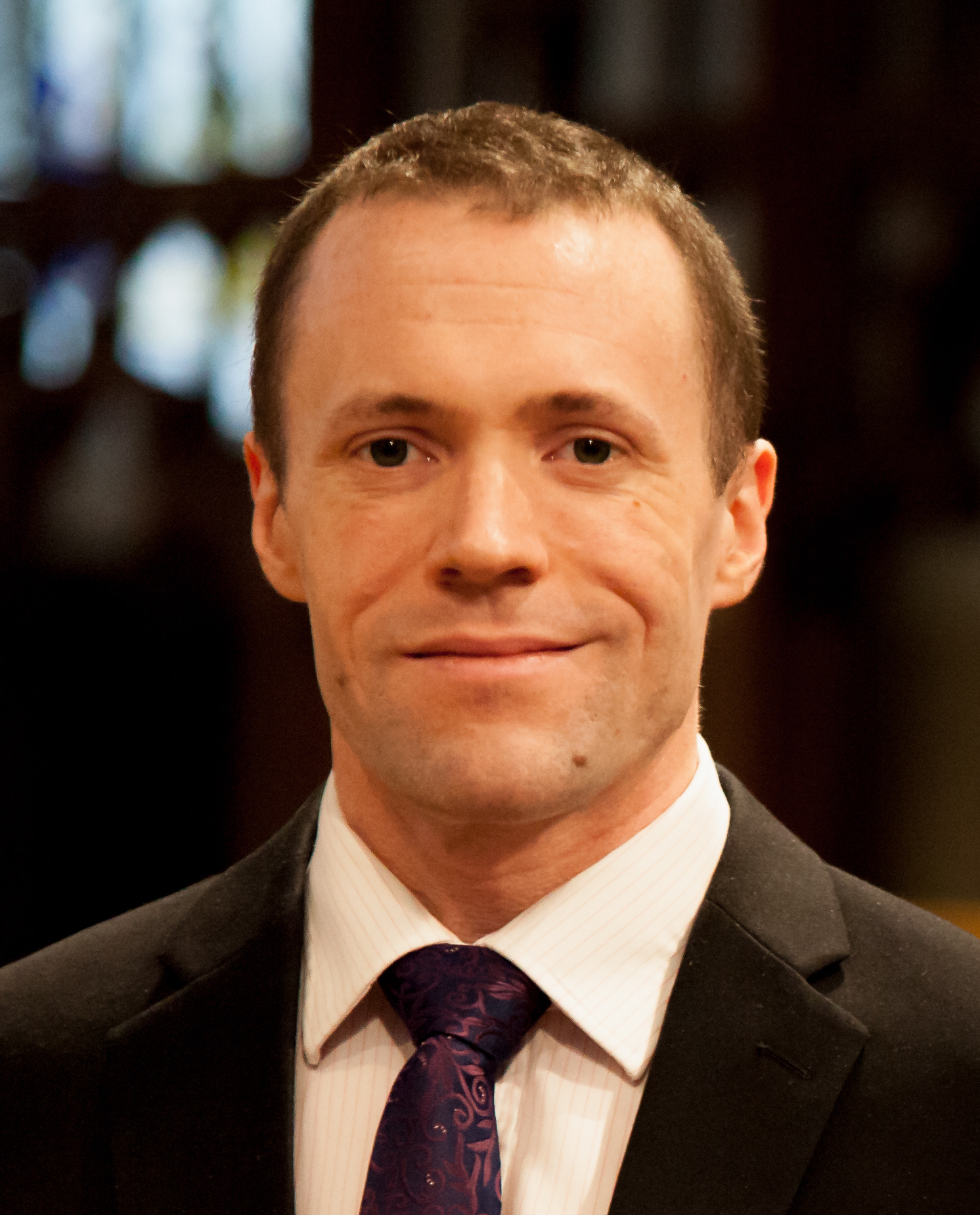

Background information
- Born: London
- Instruments: Organ (music); Conducting
- Years active: 1999-present

Marcus Wibberley (born 1981) is a British organist, conductor and choir trainer.

== Education ==
Marcus Wibberley was a Chorister at Westminster Abbey under Martin Neary and subsequently attended Dulwich College as a Music Scholar. In the sixth form, he became the first Organ Scholar of the newly reestablished Choral Foundation at the college, originally established in 1626 by founder Edward Alleyn. He was appointed Organ Scholar at Chichester Cathedral on leaving school in 1999 and later to the same position at York Minster in 2003 after graduating from the University of Hull with a First in Music (majoring in performance). While an undergraduate at Hull, he had combined his studies with being University Organist & Director of the Chapel Choir and Assistant Organist at nearby Beverley Minster. His organ teachers included Martin Baker, John Scott Whiteley and David Sanger.

== Career ==
Marcus Wibberley became Sub-Organist of Portsmouth Cathedral and the Diocesan Music Adviser for the Anglican Diocese of Portsmouth in 2005. As Diocesan Music Adviser, he ran pioneering schemes to provide free organ tuition for school children and adult parish organists throughout the diocese, and introduced singing and church music to school children and their teachers. As Cathedral Sub-Organist, he accompanied the Cathedral Choir on a number of foreign tours, highly acclaimed BBC broadcasts and CD recordings.

In 2011 he was appointed Director of Music & Organist of Hexham Abbey, where his responsibilities included training and directing the Abbey Choirs. In addition to the four weekly choral services at the Abbey, he appeared with the choir in concert elsewhere in the UK and in Germany, Belgium and Estonia. He was also Festival Director of the annual Hexham Abbey Festival of Music & Arts, for which he developed the scope of the programme, made the festival international by incorporating eminent artists from abroad and increased performance opportunities and exposure for young artists about to embark on their professional careers.

Marcus Wibberley returned to his native south London in 2017 and has been active in church music and the central London concert scene. He has worked at St John's, Smith Square, St George's Church, Beckenham and St Dunstan's College, and has directed the South London Singers, the St George's Chamber Orchestra and the Chameleon Arts Orchestra. In August 2018 he served on the faculty of the RSCM Nigeria National Summer Course and Conference in Lagos, and in 2019 he took the choir of St George's Beckenham to The Vatican to sing Mass at St. Peter's Basilica.

Marcus Wibberley is in demand as a recitalist, and has travelled extensively. Solo recitals have been given in prominent venues in Japan, Nigeria, France, Belgium, Germany, Denmark and Estonia, as well as most of the major cathedrals and abbeys in the UK.

== Discography ==
- 2012 – Baltic Exchange: Music For Seafarers, with David Price (musician) (conductor), Portsmouth Cathedral Choir, Cantate and the Convivium Singers, for Convivium Records
- 2010 – In Your Image: Carols For Christmastide, with David Price (conductor) and Portsmouth Cathedral Choir, for Convivium Records
- 2009 – Valete in Pace, with Andrew Parrott, Mark le Brocq (tenor), Britten Sinfonia, Portsmouth Cathedral Choir and the Choir of Clare College Cambridge, for Smudged Discs
- 2009 – Sing to the Lord, with Andrew Cleary, David Price, Portsmouth Cathedral Choir and Cantate, for Convivium Records

Cultural offices
| Preceded by Michael Haynes | Director of Music of Hexham Abbey; 2011 - 2017 | Succeeded by Michael Haynes |
| Preceded by Rosemary Field | Sub-Organist of Portsmouth Cathedral; 2005 - 2011 | Succeeded by Oliver Hancock |
| Preceded by Rosemary Field | Portsmouth Diocesan Music Adviser; 2005 - 2009 (post discontinued) | |
