= Alfred Caldicott =

English musician and composer

Alfred James Caldicott (26 November 1842 – 24 October 1897) was an English musician and composer of operas, cantatas, children's songs, humorous songs and glees.

== Early life and education ==
He was born in Worcester, the eldest son of William Caldicott, a hop merchant and amateur musician. At the age of nine he became a choirboy in Worcester Cathedral, where several of his brothers and half-brothers subsequently also sang. He rose to be the leading boy treble, and, while taking part in the Three Choirs Festival, formed the ambition to conduct an oratorio of his own in the cathedral. At the age of fourteen his voice broke, and he was articled to William Done, the cathedral organist. He remained at Worcester, acting as assistant to Done until 1863, when he entered the Leipzig Conservatory to complete his studies, returning to the city in 1865 to become organist at St. Stephen's Church and honorary organist to the municipal corporation. He was admitted to Trinity College, Cambridge in 1876, graduating as a Bachelor of Music in 1878.

== Career ==
In 1878, Caldicott began to achieve success with a series of glees based on nursery rhymes. "Humpty Dumpty", the first of these, was awarded a special prize in a competition instituted by the Manchester Glee Society in the year of his graduation. It was followed by another work that year, "Jack and Jill", and in 1879 by "Little Jack Horner". Later pieces in the same humorous vein included "This Is the House That Jack Built" (1880), "The Spider and the Fly", "The Boy and the Bee", "Poor Little Tomee!" and "Where are you going to my pretty maid?" The Dictionary of National Biography later noted that “the special novelty he brought forward was the humorous admixture of childish words and very complicated music…He set these nursery rhymes in the most elaborately scientific style, with full use of contrast and the opportunities afforded by individual words”.

In 1879 Caldicott's serious glee "Winter Days" had won the prize offered by the Huddersfield Glee and Madrigal Union. In the wake of his popularity, both in Britain and abroad, he was now commissioned to compose an oratorio for the Worcester festival. He chose the story of the Widow of Nain as subject, writing both libretto and music himself, and on 12 September 1881 realised his boyhood dream by conducting his oratorio in the cathedral.

In 1882 Caldicott left Worcester for Torquay, but a few months later settled in London. He then began to compose operettas for Thomas German Reed performed at St. George's Hall, London, the first being Treasure Trove, performed in 1883. Reed produced twelve others, including A Moss Rose Rent, 1883; Old Knockles, 1884; In Cupid's Court, 1885; A United Pair, 1886; The Bosun's Mate, 1888; The Friar; Wanted an Heir; In Possession; Brittany Folk; Tally Ho! (1890). When the Albert Palace in Battersea Park was opened with ambitious intentions a full orchestra was engaged, and Caldicott was appointed conductor. He composed a dedication ode for the opening on 6 June 1885, but very soon resigned. He afterwards conducted at the Prince of Wales's Theatre, where two operettas, All Abroad and John Smith, commissioned by Carl Rosa, were performed in 1889–90. He went to the United States in 1890 as conductor to Agnes Huntingdon's light opera company. After his return to England he was appointed a professor at the Royal College of Music and the Guildhall School of Music. In 1892 he resigned these posts on being appointed principal of the London College of Music. He also became conductor at the Comedy Theatre in 1893.

Incessant work overtaxed his strength, and in 1896 cerebral exhaustion gradually developed. His last composition was a part song, "The Angel Sowers", composed for J. S. Curwen's Choral Handbook (1885). He died at Barnwood House Hospital, near Gloucester, on 24 October 1897. But in the year following his death, Caldicott's continuing reputation ensured that his glee, then titled "Little Jacky Horner", had the distinction of being performed as part of the series of what were then known as Mr Robert Newman’s Promenade Concerts in the Queen’s Hall.

== Personal life ==
Caldicott married Maria Turner (Mayne), niece of Sir Richard Mayne, and a soprano singer. They had three sons and a daughter.
