= Thomas Ebdon =

British composer and organist

Thomas Ebdon (1738–1811) was a British composer and organist born in Durham. He was a chorister at Durham Cathedral and was a pupil of James Heseltine, the organist there. He succeeded Heseltine in the office, aged 35, after some wrangling between the Chapter and Dean. He died in office. He is most famous for the evening part of his Service in C, and his setting of the Preces and Responses.

Ebdon was for many years a freemason at the Granby lodge in Durham, as well as being a senior member of the Provincial Grand Lodge of Durham, established in 1788. A march by Ebdon, for wind and brass (published by Dale of London in 1792), was composed for the installation in 1788 of William Lambton (1764–97) as the first Provincial Grand Master of Durham.

Cultural offices
Preceded by James Heseltine	Organist and Master of the Choristers of Durham Cathedral; 1763-1811	Succeeded by Charles E. J. Clarke
