= James Heseltine =

English organist (c. 1690 – 1763)

- Born: c. 1690; England
- Died: 20 June 1763 (aged 72–73)
- Occupation: Organist
- Years active: 1700s–1763
- Employer: Durham Cathedral

James Heseltine (also spelled Hesletine; c. 1690 – 20 June 1763) was organist of Durham Cathedral.

== Life ==
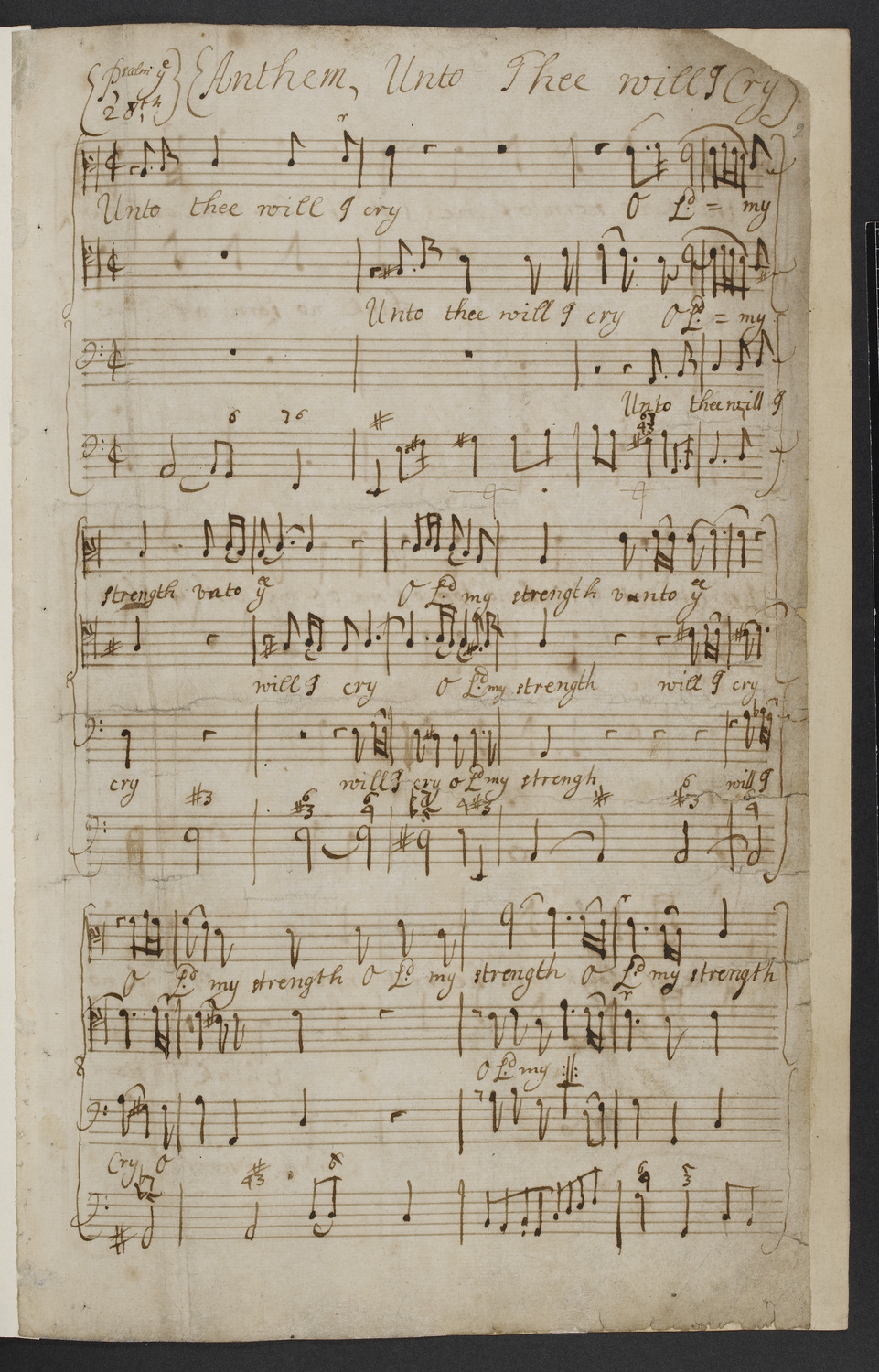
The manuscript of Heseltine's "Unto Thee will I cry", dated 17 September 1707, in the British Library

Heseltine was a pupil of John Blow at the Chapel Royal in London, leaving the chapel choir when his voice broke in 1707. Early in the century, he was organist at St Katharine's by the Tower, in London. In January 1711, he was elected organist of Durham Cathedral, retaining his London appointment.

He composed anthems and other works, but because of a misunderstanding between him and the dean and chapter of the cathedral, he destroyed a large part of them. However, six were published in A Collection of Anthems (1749).

In 1730, Heseltine married Frances, daughter of George Wheler, canon of Durham. He remained as organist of the cathedral until his death in 1763. He was buried in the Galilee chapel of the cathedral. His pupil Thomas Ebdon succeeded him as organist.

His wife predeceased him, and there were no children; his property was claimed by a nephew and niece in America.

Cultural offices
Preceded by William Greggs	Organist and Master of the Choristers of Durham Cathedral; 1710-1763	Succeeded by Thomas Ebdon
