= Hugh Blair (composer) =

English composer and organist (1864–1932)

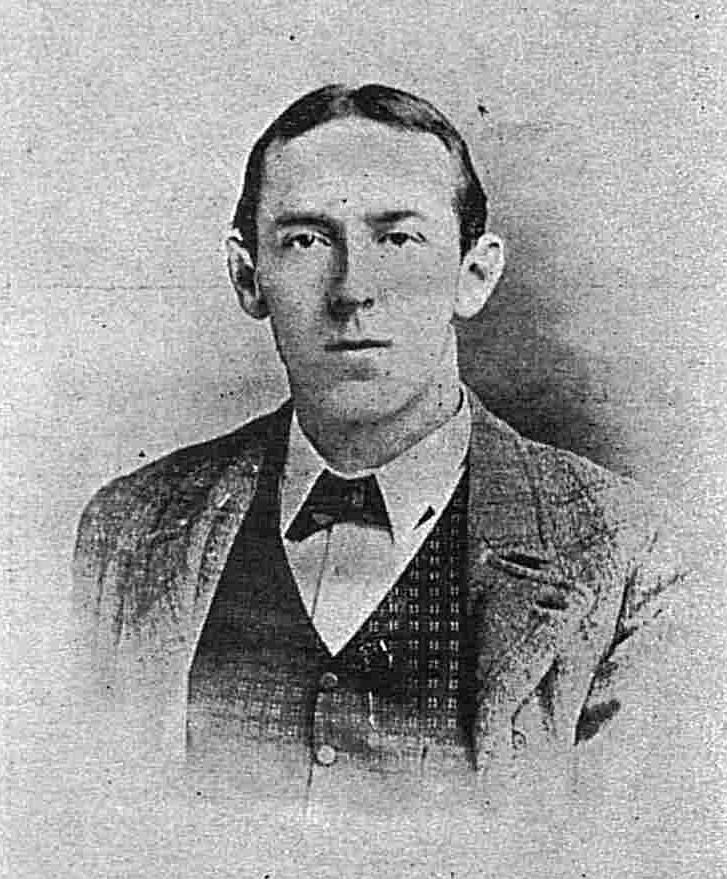
- Hugh Blair, c.1892
- Born: 25 May 1864; Worcester, England
- Died: 22 July 1932 (aged 68)
- Education: Christ's College, Cambridge B.A. (1886), Mus.B. (1887), M.A. (1896), Mus.D. (1906)

Hugh Blair (25 May 1864, Worcester – 22 July 1932, Worthing) was an English musician, composer and organist.

== Early life ==
Born in Worcester, Hugh Blair was the son of Rev. Robert Hugh Blair, who founded Worcester College for the Blind in 1866.

A chorister at Worcester Cathedral (under William Done) and a pupil at King's School, Worcester, Blair was organ scholar (1883) and College Organist (1884–86) at Christ's College, Cambridge (matriculated 1884, graduated B.A. 1886, Mus.B. 1887, M.A. 1896, Mus.D. 1906).

== Career ==
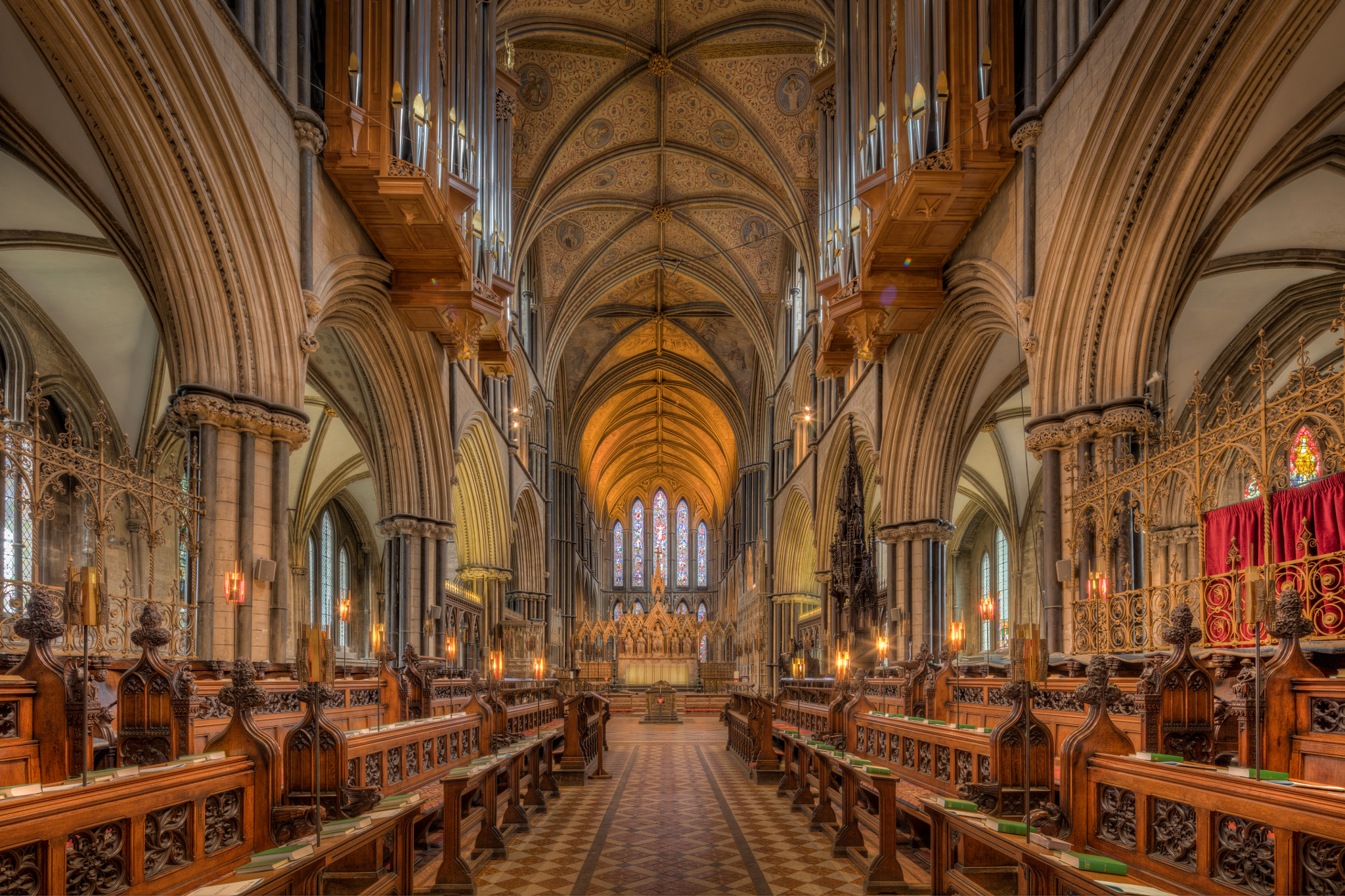
Blair was a chorister and later organist at Worcester Cathedral

Blair returned to Worcester Cathedral as Assistant Organist (1887–89), Organist-in-Charge (1889–95) and Organist (1895–97). William Done (by this stage in his seventies) handed his duties to Blair in 1889, but remained titular Organist until his death in 1895, whereupon Blair succeeded him.

Edward Elgar dedicated his cantata The Black Knight to Blair, who was conductor of the Worcester Festival Choral Society, which gave the first performance on 18 April 1893, at a time when Elgar was little known outside Worcestershire.

Blair also gave the first performance of Elgar's Organ Sonata in G on 8 July 1895, having asked Elgar to write an organ voluntary for the visit of some American organists to Worcester. The work's opening theme is reminiscent of a theme from The Black Knight.

Blair directed the Three Choirs Festivals of 1893 and 1896. In 1896, Blair conducted the Festival's first performance of the Verdi Requiem, and the premières of his own cantata Blessed are they who watch and Elgar's oratorio The Light of Life (Lux Christi).

Blair resigned as organist at Worcester Cathedral in June 1897. He was appointed organist at Holy Trinity Church, Marylebone in 1898, and served as Director of Music of the Borough of Battersea (1900–04), overseeing the installation of the organ at Battersea Town Hall in 1901.

Blair also worked for the publishing firm Novello & Co, co-editing The Church Hymnal for the Christian Year, published in 1917.

== Selected works ==
Worcester Cathedral Library contains copies of his compositions. His Magnificat and Nunc Dimittis in B minor for double choir is still performed and recorded. Kevin Allen lists seven sets of Canticles, a Short Sonata in G major for organ (1903) and a Piano Trio in D minor amongst his compositions.

- Magnificat and Nunc Dimittis in B minor (1887) — "Magnificat and Nunc Dimittis in B minor (Hugh Blair)". CPDL.
- Advent Cantata "Blessed are they who watch" (1894)
- Meditation in F (1905) — Meditation in F on YouTube
- Milton Suite for Organ (1917) — Milton Suite for Organ: Scores at the International Music Score Library Project

Cultural offices
Preceded by William Done	Organist and Master of the Choristers of Worcester Cathedral; 1895–1897	Succeeded by Ivor Atkins
