= Worcester Cathedral Choir =

Worcester Cathedral Choir is an English Anglican choir based at Worcester Cathedral in Worcester, England. It is directed by Samuel Hudson, Organist and Director of Music at the cathedral.

The choir was founded in medieval times. Famous organists at Worcester have included the composer Thomas Tomkins. Another composer associated with Worcester is Elgar, who composed music for both Roman Catholic and Anglican services.

Choristers are educated at the King's School, Worcester which is a private co-educational day school. According to the Cathedral website, from 2021 girls have taken an "equal share in choristership" (although it appears boys and girls sections sing independently in services). There are also lay clerks (professional adult singers).
