= Penair School =

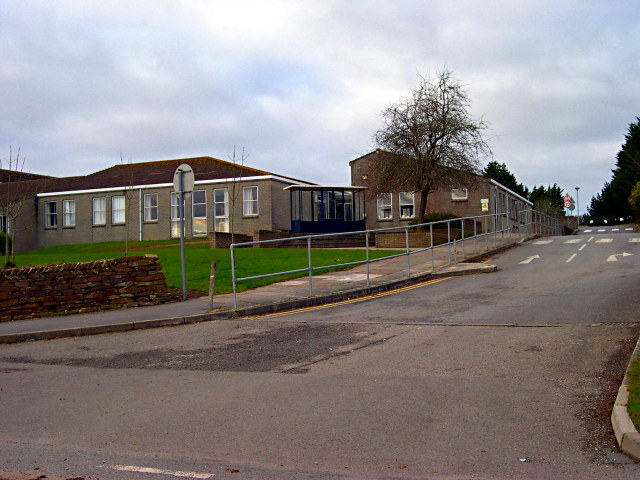

Location
- St Clement's Hill; Truro, Cornwall, TR1 1TN; England; 50°16′03″N 5°01′51″W

Information
- Type: Academy
- Motto: Disce Ut Vivas : Learn [in order] to live
- Established: 1980
- Department for Education URN: 136567 Tables
- Ofsted: Reports
- Headteacher: James Davidson
- Gender: Coeducational
- Age: 11 to 16
- Enrolment: >1000
- Houses: Sennen, Gylingvase, Crantock, Fistral (used for sporting events and competitions, but little else)
- Colours: Blue (house colours in order: green, yellow, red, blue)
- Website: www.penair.cornwall.sch.uk

Penair School is a secondary academy school in Truro, Cornwall, England, for children aged 11 to 16. It is named after Penair House, a mansion built in the late 18th century by Rear-Admiral Robert Carthew Reynolds. It is currently graded as ‘good’ by government inspectors Ofsted, with the last inspection at the time of writing having taken place on 17 May 2017.

The school is at the top of St Clement's Hill, and has several playing fields as well as other facilities such as a fitness suite and an AstroTurf pitch. James Davidson became Penair's Headteacher in September 2015.

== Notable former pupils ==
- Jason Dawe, Automotive Journalist at The Sunday Times and TV presenter
- Staff Sergeant Olaf Schmid, George Cross holder
- Tom Voyce, rugby union player, for London Welsh and England
