= Kim Hughes (British Army soldier) =

British Army bomb disposal expert

- Born: 12 September 1979 (age 47)
- Military career
- Allegiance: United Kingdom
- Branch: British Army
- Service years: 1997–2020
- Rank: Warrant Officer Class 1
- Unit: 11 Explosive Ordnance Disposal Regiment RLC
- Conflicts: War in Afghanistan; Iraq War
- Awards: George Cross

Warrant Officer Class 1 Kim Spencer Hughes, GC (born 12 September 1979) is a British Army bomb disposal expert (Ammunition Technician) who was awarded the George Cross as a staff sergeant for gallant acts carried out in the Afghanistan conflict. Hughes made safe 119 improvised explosive devices on his tour of Afghanistan. The citation was presented to Hughes by the Chief of the Defence Staff, Air Chief Marshal Sir Jock Stirrup on 18 March 2010 in a ceremony in the City of London. The posthumous award of the GC to Staff Sergeant Olaf Schmid was announced at the same time. The awarded was gazetted on 19 March 2010.

His citation states that he carried out "the single most outstanding act of explosive ordnance disposal ever recorded in Afghanistan".

== Early life ==
Hughes was born in Germany, where his father was serving in the Royal Electrical and Mechanical Engineers, and returned to England in 1985. He lived in Weston-super-Mare until 1988 when he moved to Telford. There he was educated at Thomas Telford School.

== Later life ==
Hughes left the army in October 2020. He has since published an autobiographical account of his experiences in Afghanistan, Painting the Sand, plus a thriller novel, Operation Certain Death.

Since 2022, Hughes has been the Vice Chairman of the Victoria Cross and George Cross Association.
