= Olaf Schmid =

British Army soldier

Staff Sergeant Olaf Schmid GC
- Born: 11 June 1979; Truro, Cornwall, England
- Died: 31 October 2009 (aged 30); Sangin, Helmand Province, Afghanistan
- Relatives: Christina Schmid (wife)
- Military career
- Allegiance: United Kingdom
- Branch: British Army
- Service years: 1996–2009
- Rank: Staff Sergeant
- Nickname: "Oz"
- Service number: 25045811
- Unit: 11 Explosive Ordnance Disposal Regiment RLC
- Conflicts: War in Afghanistan; Iraq War
- Awards: George Cross

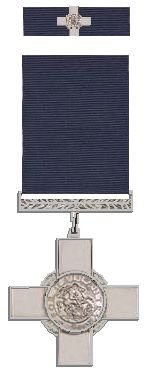
George Cross and its ribbon bar

Staff Sergeant Olaf Sean George Schmid, GC (11 June 1979 – 31 October 2009) was a British Army bomb disposal expert (Ammunition Technician) who was killed in action in the Afghanistan conflict. Schmid was posthumously awarded the George Cross after he made safe 70 devices before his death in October 2009. The citation was presented to Schmid's widow, Christina Schmid, by the Chief of the Defence Staff Sir Jock Stirrup on 18 March 2010 in a ceremony in the City of London. The announcement of the award of the GC to Staff Sergeant Kim Hughes was made at the same time.

== Early life ==
Schmid was born on 11 June 1979 in Truro, Cornwall, to a German mother, Barbara, and a Swedish father, Hans-Jörg Schmid, he was brother to Torben and half brother to Gregory. He was educated at Penair School in Truro, and was a choir boy in Truro Cathedral Choir, ultimately becoming head chorister. Schmid lived in Winchester, Hampshire, with his wife Christina and his step-son Laird.

== Army career ==
Schmid joined the British Army in 1996, enlisting in the Royal Logistic Corps and shortly afterwards he applied to train as a bomb disposal specialist. He served in Northern Ireland, Yugoslavia and Kosovo before being sent to Afghanistan in June 2009. He arrived during Operation Panther's Claw in Helmand Province. On 31 October 2009 Schmid was killed instantly when a device he was defusing in Sangin, Helmand Province exploded.

== Death and legacy ==
After Schmid's death was announced several people left tributes to his courage. Schmid's commanding officer, Lieutenant Colonel Robert Thomson, commanding 2nd Rifles Battle Group, said: "Staff-Sergeant Oz Schmid was simply the bravest and most courageous man I have ever met. Under relentless IED and small arms attacks he stood taller than the tallest." A funeral and memorial service was held at Truro Cathedral on 24 November 2009. On 21 September 2010, his widow, Christina Schmid, was a contributor in a programme in BBC Radio 4's Soul Music series about Gabriel Fauré's Requiem with conductor David Willcocks. The Requiem was performed at the memorial service for Schmid.

=== George Cross ===
On 18 March 2010, Sir Jock Stirrup, the Chief of the Defence Staff announced that Schmid would be posthumously awarded the George Cross, and presented a framed copy of the citation to Schmid's widow during a ceremony at the headquarters of the Honourable Artillery Company in the City of London. The award was gazetted on 19 March 2010. Schmid's widow, Christina, was presented with the medal in a private ceremony at Buckingham Palace on 2 June 2010. She attended the ceremony with her son Laird and her parents.
