= Soul Music (radio series) =

Music documentary radio series

- Running time: 28 minutes
- Country of origin: United Kingdom
- Language(s): English
- Home station: BBC Radio 4
- Original release: 26 November 2000 – present
- Website: Soul Music

Soul Music is a music documentary series on BBC Radio 4, first broadcast in November 2000, which aims to focus on the emotional impact of famous pieces of music. The works chosen can be anything from classical, popular, jazz or religious. The first episode examined Sir Edward Elgar's Cello Concerto in E minor.

The programme does not have a presenter, but features a montage of interviews interspersed with clips of the work in question. Each programme usually has three to five contributors who have a personal story connected to the piece of music. One is usually a musicologist, conductor or performer who discusses the background to the work or composer, the other contributors are people who have a personal story connected to the piece. For example, a 2010 episode on Gabriel Fauré's Requiem featured Fauré biographer Jessica Duchen discussing the history of the work; veteran choral conductor Sir David Willcocks, who reflected on his experience in the artillery during World War II; Christina Schmid, widow of Staff Sergeant Olaf Schmid GC; and Paul Hawkins, vicar of St Pancras New Church, who organised a performance the weekend after the 7 July 2005 London bombings.

Soul Music has been broadcast for 30 series, as of 2024, and has featured works as diverse as "Feed the Birds" from Mary Poppins, George Butterworth's A Shropshire Lad Rhapsody, Glen Campbell's "Wichita Lineman" and the hymn "Dear Lord and Father of Mankind". Antonia Quirke, writing in the New Statesman, notes that each episode is produced by one person and can take up to five years before a suitable range of speakers can be compiled, citing the episode on Richard Wagner's Siegfried Idyll.
