= Three Bavarian Dances =

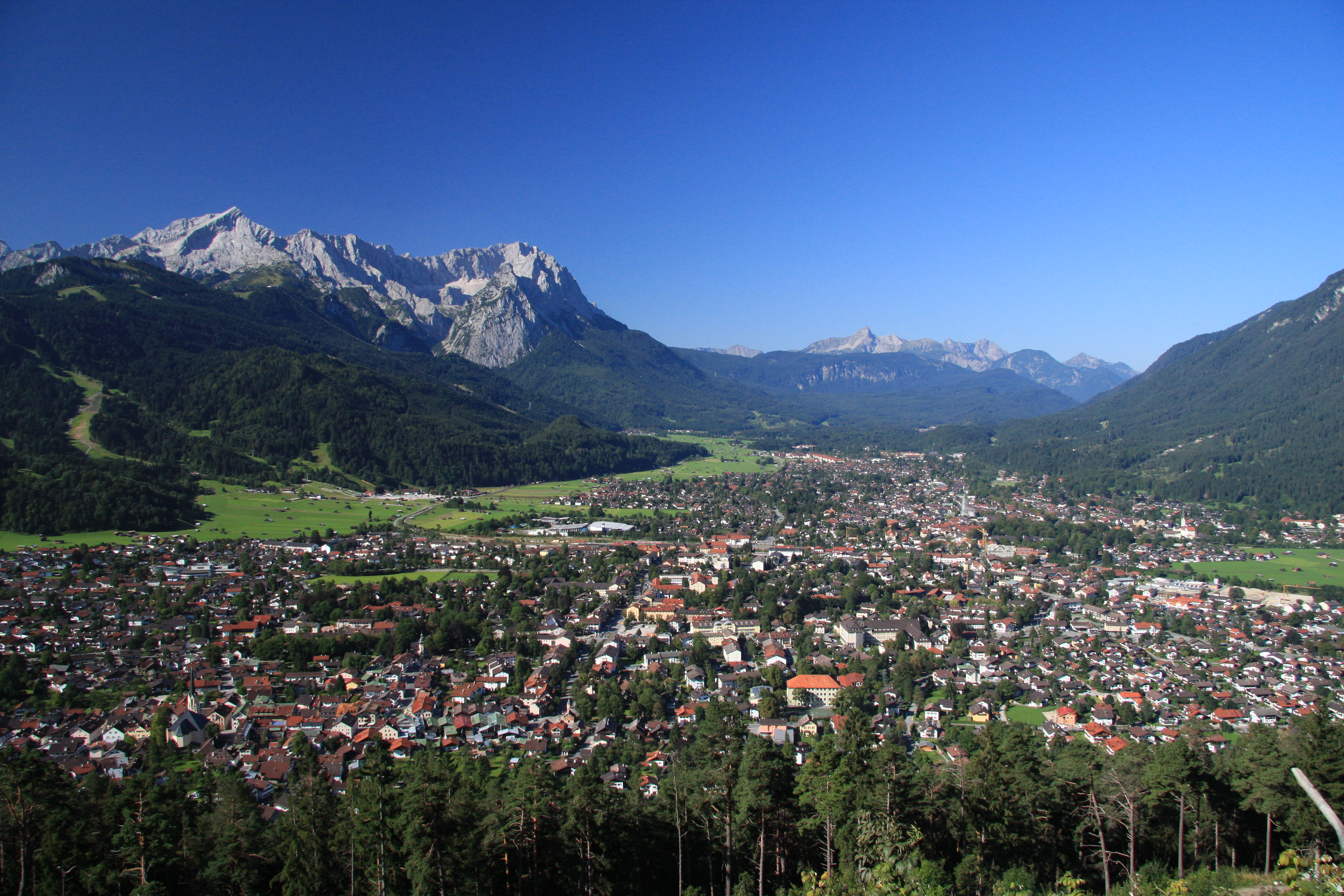
Landscape of Garmisch

Three Bavarian Dances, Op. 27, is an orchestral work by Edward Elgar.

It is an arrangement for orchestra of three of the set of six songs titled From the Bavarian Highlands. The original song lyrics were written by the composer’s wife Alice, as a memento of a holiday the Elgars had enjoyed in Upper Bavaria, mostly at Garmisch, in the autumn of 1894. As well as the titles, Alice Elgar gave the songs sub-titles in recollection of favourite places visited during the holiday.

The suite was first performed on 23 October 1897, conducted by Elgar in one of August Manns' concerts at Crystal Palace. The Times stated that Elgar conducted the Dances 'in first-rate style', and Manns the rest of the programme.

The three dances are:

- "The Dance (Sonnenbichl)" – Allegretto giocoso 3/8 G major
- "Lullaby (In Hammersbach)" – Moderato 3/4 D major
- "The Marksmen (Bei Murnau)" – Allegro vivace 3/4 G major

All three dances are characteristic of the composer. The first is bright and robust, the second is Elgar in his gentle pastoral vein, with a wistful melody for the horn, and the third – the longest (about four and a half minutes) – is an Elgar finale in miniature, lively at first, then broadening and finally quickening to end in a blaze of orchestral colour.

== Sources ==
- The Elgar Society website (consulted January 2007)
- Percy Young: sleeve note to EMI recording ASD 2356 (1968)
- Young, Percy M. (1973). Elgar O.M.: a study of a musician. London: Collins. OCLC 869820.
- Score, Elgar: Three Bavarian Dances, Joseph Williams, London, 1901
