= From the Bavarian Highlands =

1896 work for choir and orchestra by Edward Elgar

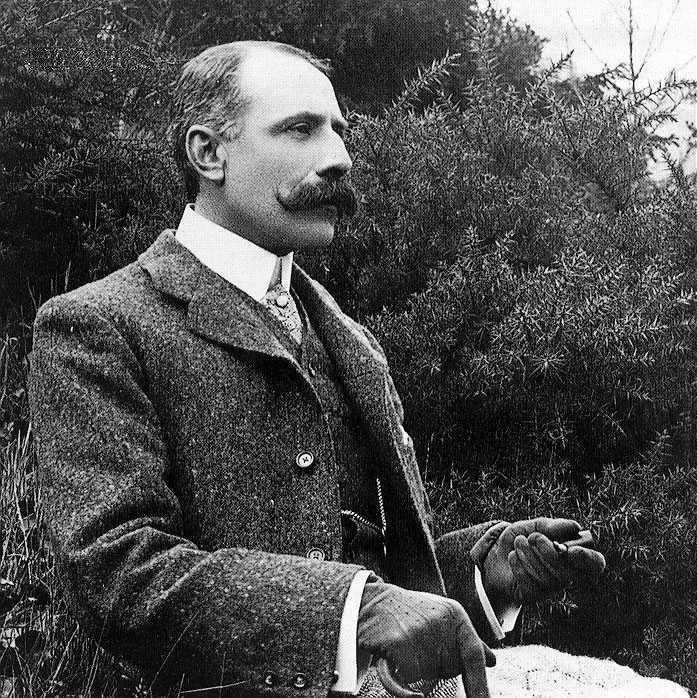
Edward Elgar, c. 1900

From the Bavarian Highlands, Op. 27, is a work for choir and orchestra by Edward Elgar.

It is a set of six choral songs Elgar wrote under the collective title Scenes from the Bavarian Highlands, as a remembrance of a holiday the Elgars had enjoyed in Upper Bavaria, mostly at Garmisch, in the autumn of 1894. The song lyrics were adapted to Elgar's music by the composer’s wife Alice with words "adapted from the Volkslieder and Schnadahüpfler" imitating the spirit of the dances. Alice gave the songs sub-titles in recollection of favourite places visited during the holiday. It was originally arranged with piano (1895) then later arranged with orchestral accompaniment (1896). It was dedicated to Mr and Mrs Slingsby Bethell, the proprietors of the Garmisch pension where the Elgars had stayed.

The songs were published by Joseph Williams & Co. in December 1895, after first having been rejected by Novello's. They were first performed on 21 April 1896, by the Worcester Festival Choral Society conducted by the composer

== Songs ==
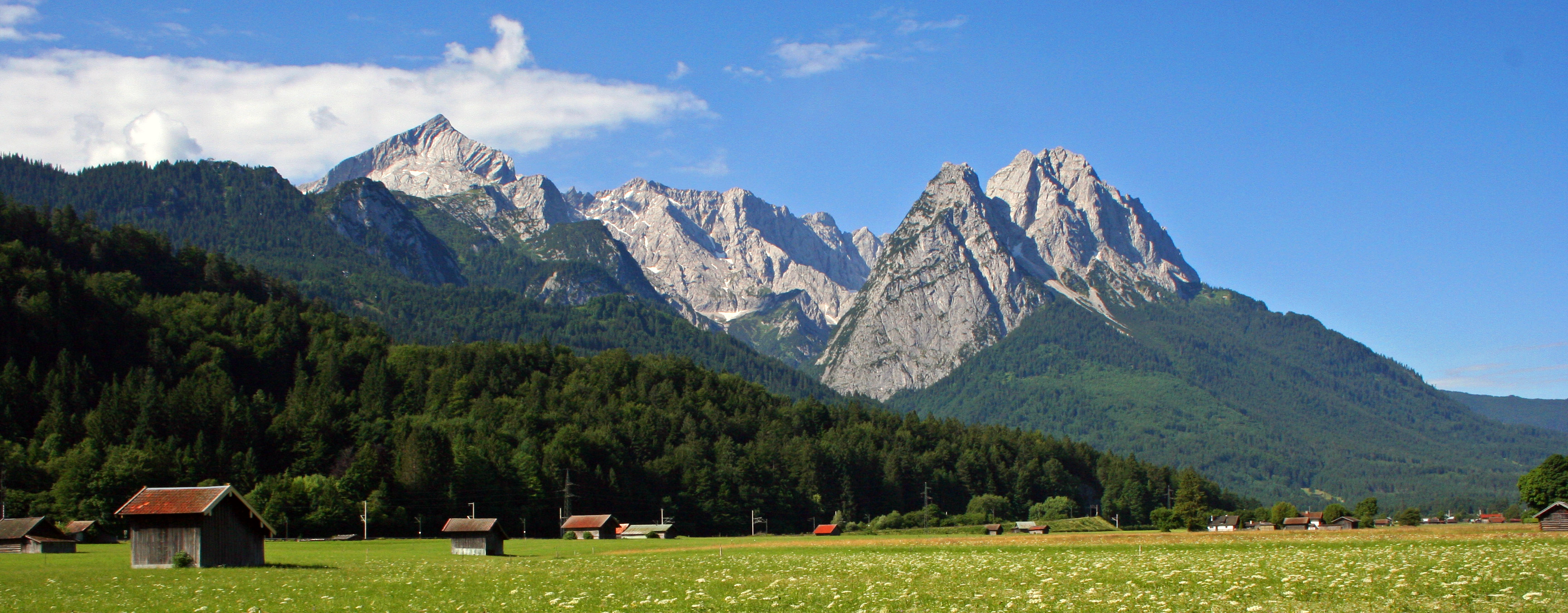
Mountains viewed from Garmisch

The six songs are:

1. The Dance (Sonnenbichl) – Allegretto giocoso
2. False Love (Wamberg) – Allegretto ma moderato
3. Lullaby (In Hammersbach) – Moderato
4. Aspiration (Bei Sankt Anton) – Adagio
5. On the Alm (True Love, Hoch Alp) – Allegro piacevole
6. The Marksmen (Bei Murnau) – Allegro vivace

Numbers 1, 3 and 6 were later published as a suite for orchestra with the title Three Bavarian Dances.

There have been performances and recordings of both the original version with piano and the revised version with orchestra.

== Sources ==
- Kennedy, Michael (1987). Portrait of Elgar (third ed.). Oxford: Clarendon Press. ISBN 0-19-284017-7.
- Moore, Jerrold N. (1984). Edward Elgar: a Creative Life. Oxford: Oxford University Press. ISBN 0-19-315447-1.
- Young, Percy M. (1973). Elgar O.M.: a study of a musician. London: Collins. OCLC 869820.
