= Henry Geehl =

English musician (1881–1961)

External audio
- Shellac recordings with Henry Geehl in the Online Archive of the Österreichische Mediathek

Henry Ernest Geehl [pronounced 'Gale'] (28 September 1881 – 14 January 1961) was an English pianist, conductor, composer and arranger.

Born in London in 1881, Geehl studied piano with Benno Schönberger and R. O. Morgan in London, and with Anton Schlieber in Vienna. He toured as a pianist and theatre conductor, and in 1919 joined the Trinity College of Music as a teacher, where he remained on staff as a teacher until a year before his death. His students included Pete Moore, Eric Parkin, William Lovelock and Nicholas Temperley. He also became music editor for the Edwin Ashdown and Enoch publishing firm. In later life he lived at Coleshill, near Beaconsfield, Bucks, where he gave private lessons in piano, violin, and composition.

Henry Geehl had an affinity with music written for brass bands. He arranged Gustav Holst's A Moorside Suite for brass band, made many other arrangements and transcriptions, and was the first composer to write serious symphonic music directly for brass band. His Scena Sinfonica, in the style of an operatic selection, has been used as a test piece for brass bands. He made claims to have scored Edward Elgar's The Severn Suite for brass band from the composer's rough sketches, but Geehl's account of his involvement with Elgar has now been exposed as a self-serving fantasy.

His other works include a symphony, concertos for piano and violin, Suite espagnole, Comedy Overture, In Fairyland, On the Cornish Coast, Rhapsody for band, Prince Charlie – 1745, piano pieces and songs.

His song "For You Alone" ("Für dich allein"; words by P. J. O'Reilly) achieved great popularity, being recorded by Enrico Caruso, Lauritz Melchior, Jussi Björling and Mario Lanza, among others. (It has been claimed that "For You Alone" was the only song ever sung in English by Caruso but that is contradicted by other evidence, such as his recording of George M. Cohan's "Over There", and his His Master's Voice recording - in heavily accented English - of Arthur Sullivan's "The Lost Chord".).

Henry Geehl also wrote some film scores, including the original music for The Magic Bow (1946) and for Jassy (1947).

An arrangement by Geehl of Johann Strauss II's The Blue Danube was recorded by Richard Tauber and Florence Foster Jenkins. He also arranged Edward Elgar's Idylle, Op. 4, Adieu and Serenade for orchestra; Charles Williams's The Dream of Olwen for three voices; George H. Clutsam's Ma Curly Headed Babby; My Heart and I and other songs from Richard Tauber's Old Chelsea; May Brahe's To a Miniature and I Passed by your Window; Richard Addinsell's Warsaw Concerto, selections from Delibes' Sylvia, and César Franck's Symphonic Variations.

He conducted Oscar Natzka's recording of "O Isis and Osiris" from Mozart's The Magic Flute, and Handel's "The song of Hybrias the Cretan" and "Honour and Arms" (from Samson). Between 1939 and 1946 he conducted the orchestra for more than 90 recordings by Richard Tauber, made at the Abbey Road Studios in London. [Ref: Hansfried Sieben, Richard Tauber Discography, Wiesbaden, 1986]

Henry Geehl was reputed to be a "prickly individual". Nicholas Temperley, who was taught by him from age 8 to 13, found him a genial teacher who told many interesting stories about musicians he had known, but was inclined to brag about his achievements and relations with famous musicians of the day. He died in 1961, in Beaconsfield, Buckinghamshire.

== Sources ==
- H. C. Colles, Grove's Dictionary of Music and Musicians, 5th ed, 1954, Eric Blom, ed.
