= Leith Hill Musical Festival =

Choral festival in Dorking, England

Leith Hill Music Festival
- Choir
- Former name: Leith Hill Musical Competition (until 1950)
- Origin: Dorking, Surrey
- Founded: 1905
- Founder: Margaret Vaughan Williams and Lady Evangeline Farrer
- Genre: Choral
- Members: Choral Societies
- President: Brian Kay
- Chief conductor: Neil Ferris
- Headquarters: Dorking
- Concert hall: Dorking Halls
- Influences: Ralph Vaughan Williams
- Website: lhmf.org.uk

The Leith Hill Music Festival (LHMF) was founded in 1905 by Margaret Vaughan Williams, sister of the composer Ralph Vaughan Williams, and Lady (Evangeline) Farrer, wife of Lord Farrer of Abinger Hall. Ralph Vaughan Williams was the festival conductor from 1905 to 1953. The present festival conductor is Neil Ferris (appointed in 2024).

The musical festival consists of various independent choral societies or choirs who are member choirs and therefore comes together under the organisation of the Festival to perform the concerts and competition for each season. A season starts in mid March and includes the mid-March concert of J. S. Bach's St Matthew, St John Passion or Handel's Messiah (latest addition), then a Youth Competition and the main Festival usually in first week of April but definitely avoiding Easter if it falls in April. Currently (as of 2017), there are 12 choirs in the group which is split in 3 divisions for competitions and concerts over the Festival.

The festival is competitive, lasting three days, each day with a different division of choirs; each evening the choirs who have competed during the day combine to give a concert of the main works which form the subject of the competitions. Following the tradition established by Vaughan Williams, the festival performs a mid-March concert of the Passions by J.S. Bach alternate years as a taster and build up to the main festival and competition in early April. Handel's Messiah and Bach's B Minor Mass have also been added. The present chorus master for these concerts is Ben Costello, appointed in 2014. These concerts are open to the public as singers at a fee and rehearsals are held in Dorking, the traditional home of the Festival.

== History ==
In 1905, Margaret Vaughan Williams (known as Meggie, b. 1870), the older sister of the English composer, Ralph Vaughan Williams and her friend, Lady Evangeline (Eva, b. 1871) Farrer, the wife of Lord Farrer of Abinger Hall formed the Leith Musical Festival. This was a time musical festivals were like a movement, following in the line of Mary Wakefield having founded one of the earliest in Cumbria in 1885. At its founding, the two ladies named it Leith Hill Musical Competitions, a name it bore until 1950.

Meggie was brought up in Leith Hill Place, her mother's family home after their father died. She was schooled at home. Eva (Lady Farrer, born Evangeline Knox) belonged to an Irish family who were often abroad. She was born in Florence and grew up in a sound knowledge of European languages. Through her own entrepreneur life, she arrived in Abinger Hall, the home of the Farrers to teach music to the child of Thomas Farrer after his wife died. She later became Farrer's [second] wife.

How the two ladies met is unclear. But records show that Meggie was visiting Abinger Hall since 1892 and supposedly was acquainted with Ida Darwin (née Farrer). This, however, is not accidental since the Vaughan Williamses (through their mother Margaret Wedgewood) were great nephews of Charles Darwin. Regardless the circumstances, Meggie and Eva, being nearly of the same age and young, struck up a friendship after Eva came to teach music in Abinger Hall and subsequently became the wife of Lord Farrer. It was through this friendship that they established the Musical Festival.

Eva had already experienced musical politics and administration and had studied and taught music professionally both in England and Scotland, including studying at the Royal College of Music under Hubert Parry (who was not wholly encouraging of her composition) and rated her as: "Aims of the highest. As yet very uncertain of practical details. Puts her heart into everything worth doing." During this time at RCM, which preceded her coming to Abinger Hall, Ralph Vaughan Williams was also studying at the RCM under Parry.

== Organisation ==
Currently, the festival is run by a general committee led by a chairman and the secretary who also doubles as the festival organiser. All the conductors of the independent choirs making up the Festival are also members of the committee by default as well as the festival conductor. Other key officers include the vice chairman, honorary treasurer, etc.

There is also an executive committee and a music committee. In addition, the festival appoints a president, festival conductor, chorus master, principal festival accompanist and festival accompanist.

Many other volunteers play a role in the general committee which the main backbone of the festival and the roles includes box office, choral librarians, fundraising organiser, archivist, etc.

The festival is a registered charity in England and Wales and entirely run by volunteers most of whom are members of participating choirs as well as other locals who do not sing at all.

After the death of Vaughan Williams in 1958, the festival committee commissioned David McFall to design two identical bronze reliefs with a likeness of the composer: one was placed in St Martin's Church and one in the Dorking Halls.

== Festival conductors ==
At the time of the founding of the festival, Ralph Vaughan Williams was not yet a great composer or celebrated in any way. However, with the Vaughan Williamses and the Farrers being of a liberal ideology, Ralph also saw the opportunity to use the competition as a way to include and reach more people with music. The festival has been wholly founded for amateur singers and with a goal of encouraging both music and participation. Secondly, Lady Farrer had been a fellow student with Vaughan Williams under Parry. So joining the two ladies would have been easier. Thus Ralph Vaughan Williams became the festival conductor while the ladies organised, managed and set everything about the festival, with Eva as president and Meggie as secretary. Ralph Vaughan Williams was also to hold this position until 1953, a term which remains the longest in the conductorship of the festival to date.

Since founding the group, there have been 6 conductors, as follows:

1. Ralph Vaughan Williams - 1905–1953
2. Dr William Cole - 1953–1977
3. Christopher Robinson - 1978–1980
4. William Llewellyn - 1981–1995
5. Brian Kay - 1996–2015
6. Jonathan Willcocks - 2016–2024
7. Neil Ferris - 2024 –

== The Festival ==
Publicity material created in 1905 for the first festival

The style of the festival has remained largely the same as when founded: one change being to do away with 'male voices' and 'female voice' and replace them with 'lower' and 'upper' voices respectively in reflection of the fact that women are now found singing the lower range (tenor and bass). Generally, the style of the festival is a competition in the morning followed by full concert in the evening. The morning competition involves choirs singing different choral music subtypes or classes.

- Madrigal
- Lower voices
- Upper voices
- Part song (full choir)
- Full chorus
- Ensembles
- Open class (choirs' own choice)

Marks are awarded by adjudicators on the above and prizes won with the last two classes not forming part of the aggregate mark which also attracts a prize. Each participating choir is conducted by its Conductor while the Festival Conductor is known to sit in a corner and watch without making any input or interference. Adjudicators are independently sought and invited. The appointment as adjudicator to the Festival is highly regarded by music professionals due to the quality of the competition, despite the fact that all the choirs are amateur. After the competitions, the choirs come together for a combined rehearsal which is taken by the Festival Conductor who then gives his own interpretation of the works sung in the competition.

In the evening, the main festival chorus is joined by a professional orchestra and soloists to perform concerts of a usually above amateur standard. Throughout the three days, different soloists sing on different days.

In addition to the above, the groups of choirs are rotated in a circle for performing each year; thus a group that sang on a Thursday (the first days of the festival) this year, would sing on Friday the next and Saturday the year after. Currently, there are four choirs in each group for each day. A prize is also awarded to the highest scoring Madrigal throughout the Festival.

== Youth competition ==
Initially started by the LHMC as Children's Day, the day is currently known as Youth Competition and happens one week after the mid March Concert of Passion or Messiah. The Children's Day was started in by LHMC in 1921 led by Margaret Vaughan Williams after overcoming many huddles by the County. It flourished until 1946 when it died and later resurrected to what is now the Youth Competition revived mainly in 1992 and has been hugely successful since then. The Youth Competition is however only open to children and teenagers under 18 years. The entry is currently through schools. Prizes are awarded by categories and the young people sing together at the end of the day.

== Member choirs ==
As of 2017, there are 12 member choirs in the Festival. The membership has changed over its 112 years to and have seen choirs come and go, establish and disband, struggled and merged and so on and forth. Member choirs has largely come from within the Surrey county but as the county political shape has changed, history notes that some choirs which once were in Surrey, are now outside of it. 2017 membership included:

- Beare Green & Newdigate Choral Society
- Bookham Choral Society
- Buckland & Betchworth Choral Society
- Capel Choral Society
- Dorking Choral Society
- Epsom Choral Society
- Holmbury St. Mary Choral Society
- Horsley Choral Society
- Leatherhead Choral Society
- Mickleham Choral Society
- Oxshott Choral Society
- Shalford Choral Society

== Other Events ==
=== Come & Sing ===
In October 2014, the President of the Festival together with the General and Music Committee planned and put up a singing workshop open to the general public. This was hugely successful and thus became an annual event in the calendar of the Festival, happening every October since then.

== Bibliography ==
- Corke, Shirley (2005). Music won the cause : 100 years of Leith Hill Music Festival, 1905-2005. Dorking: Leith Hill Musical Festival.
