= Vaughan Richardson =

Vaughan Richardson (died 1729) was an organist at Winchester Cathedral, and a composer, particularly of church music.

== Life ==
His year of birth is not known, but he is known to have sung at the coronation of James II in 1685 as a chorister of the Chapel Royal. After deputizing for the ailing organist Richard Davis at the Worcester Cathedral from 1686 to 1688, he became organist of Winchester Cathedral in 1693. He was also lay vicar and master of the choristers. He remained there for the rest of his life.

On 5 October 1710 he married a Mrs Apleford at Winchester Cathedral. Richardson died in 1729 in Winchester, and was buried there on 9 May. A daughter, Laetitia, survived him.

== Compositions ==
- It is known that Richardson composed 21 anthems (some surviving in manuscript), including "O Lord, God of my salvation", which has been attributed to Jeremiah Clarke, and "O how amiable"
- A Collection of New Songs (1701), including an ode to St Cecilia "Ye tuneful and harmonious choir"
- A Service in C (1713) to celebrate the Treaty of Utrecht

Cultural offices
| Preceded by Daniel Roseingrave | Organist and Master of the Choristers of Winchester Cathedral; 1693–1729 | Succeeded by John Bishop |
