= Richard Davis (composer) =

English composer and organist

Richard Davis (died April 1688) was an English composer and organist who was active at the Worcester Cathedral from 1639 until his death in 1688. He began his musical life at the cathedral as a chorister from 1639–1644. He then served as a lay clerk before being appointed organist at the cathedral in 1664. In 1671 he also became Master of Choristers at the Cathedral. While Davis held the post of organist until his death, the last two years of his life he suffered ill health and the duties of the post were filled by a deputy organist, the composer Vaughan Richardson.

Davis died in Worcester in April 1688. As a composer, his surviving compositions include a Mass in C Major and 12 anthems; all of which are part of the collection of the Worcester Cathedral's library.
