= Charles E. J. Clarke =

English cathedral organist

Charles Erlin Jackson Clarke (19 December 1795 – 28 April 1844) was an English cathedral organist, who served at Durham Cathedral and Worcester Cathedral.

Clarke was a chorister at Worcester Cathedral from 1804. In 1811, aged 15, he was appointed organist of Durham Cathedral. In 1813 he returned to Worcester, remaining cathedral organist until his death in 1844.

Cultural offices
| Preceded by Thomas Ebdon | Organist of Durham Cathedral; 1811–1813 | Succeeded by William Henshaw |
| Preceded by William Kenge | Organist and Master of the Choristers of Worcester Cathedral; 1813–1844 | Succeeded by William Done |
