= Brian Kay =

English broadcaster, conductor and singer

- Born: Brian Christopher Kay; 12 May 1944 (age 82)
- Occupations: Radio presenter, conductor and singer

Brian Christopher Kay (born 12 May 1944) is an English radio presenter, conductor and singer. He is well known as the bass in the King's Singers during the group's formative years from 1968 to 1982, and as such is to be heard on many of their 1970s recordings. He was also the voice of Papageno in the 1984 film Amadeus and the lowest frog in the Paul McCartney song "We All Stand Together" ("The Frog's Chorus").

Kay is noted as a choral conductor, being the former conductor (and now president) of the Leith Hill Musical Festival and former director of the Huddersfield Choral Society. He is principal conductor of the Really Big Chorus.

On radio, he has been a presenter of Friday Night is Music Night on BBC Radio 2 and until 2006 presented 3 for All and Brian Kay's Light Programme, a weekly programme about light music on BBC Radio 3. In 1996 he won the Sony Radio Award as Music Presenter of the Year.

He is a patron of Bampton Classical Opera and president of The English Arts Chorale, the Harrogate Choral Society and the Bristol Bach Choir.

Kay is the vice-president of the Royal School of Church Music and of the Association of British Choral Directors.
