= The Severn Suite =

Brass band work by Edward Elgar

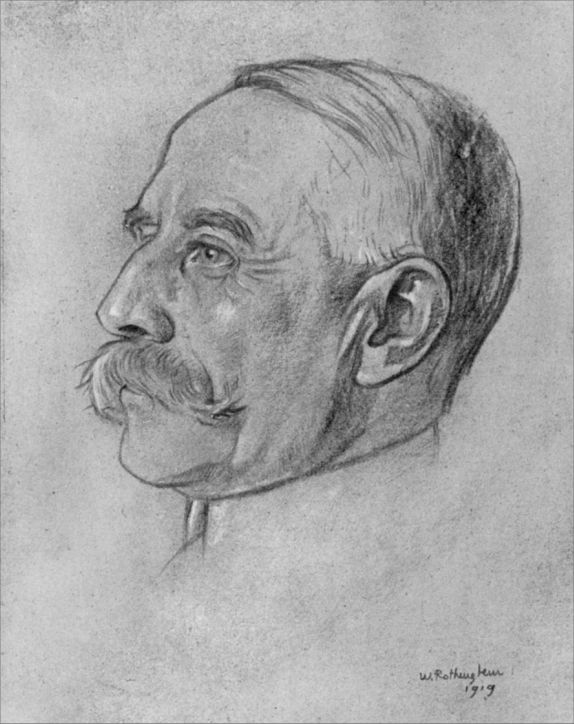
Edward Elgar in 1919, by William Rothenstein

The Severn Suite, Opus 87, is a musical work written by Sir Edward Elgar. It is a late composition, written in 1930, the result of an invitation to write a test piece for the National Brass Band Championship. It was dedicated to his friend, the author and critic George Bernard Shaw.

There are five movements, which follow each other without breaks:

1. Introduction (Worcester Castle) – Pomposo
2. Toccata (Tournament) – Allegro molto
3. Fugue (The Cathedral) – Andante
4. Minuet (Commandery) – Moderato
5. Coda – Lento – Pomposo

The Severn of the title is the name of the river which runs through the centre of the city of Worcester where Elgar spent his childhood and lived later. The subtitles refer to historic places in the city. These subtitles were not devised by Elgar himself but were later added to the Military Band arrangement published in 1931.

Of the five movements, the Fugue is a reworking of a recent but unpublished piano piece, Fugue in C minor (1923). The Minuet is based on wind chamber works written in the 1870s. Many reference books assert that The Severn Suite was entirely based on "old sketches" but the remaining three movements are, so far as is known, original compositions.

== History ==
The work was commissioned by Herbert Whiteley of the National Brass Band Championship committee and head of the brass band publishers R. Smith & Company. Although it is likely that Elgar originally expected only to supply a "short score" to be orchestrated by a brass band expert, in fact Elgar ultimately performed all the orchestration himself. Henry Geehl, a brass band composer and employee of R.Smith, later claimed to have orchestrated the piece, giving a highly circumstantial account of his involvement to several newspapers. However, in 1995 the original manuscript, entirely in Elgar's hand, resurfaced at auction — its emergence demonstrates that Geehl's longstanding claim to have orchestrated the work was in fact fraudulent. The manuscript was subsequently acquired by the Elgar Birthplace Museum, where it now resides.

The first performance was at the National Brass Band Championship at the Crystal Palace on 27 September 1930, which was won by the Foden's Motor Works Band. They then recorded excerpts from the work. It was published by R. Smith & Co. that year.

Following an invitation to record the work, the composer arranged it for symphony orchestra in 1931, and this had its first performance on 14 April 1932 with the composer conducting the London Symphony Orchestra. The full score of this version, first published by Acuta Music in 1991, was based on a handwritten publisher’s fair copy. This publication was subsequently revised following the reappearance of the composer”s original orchestral MS in 2010.

Elgar's friend Ivor Atkins suggested that the Suite should be transcribed for organ. Elgar asked Atkins to work with him on the arrangement. The resulting work was completed in 1932 and published as Elgar's 'Second Organ Sonata'.

In 2019 Professor Stephen Arthur Allen (Rider University) prepared a new 90th Anniversary Critical Edition of the brass band score correcting all errors made by Geehl when preparing the original published version of 1930.

== Instrumentation ==
Brass band
Soprano cornet, solo cornet, repiano cornet & flugelhorn, 2nd & 3rd cornets, solo tenor horn, 1st & 2nd tenor horns, 1st & 2nd baritones, 1st & 2nd tenor trombones, bass trombone, euphonium, E♭ and B♭ basses, drums (side drum, cymbals, bass drum).
Symphony orchestra
Piccolo, 2 flutes, 2 oboes, cor anglais, 2 clarinets in B♭, bass clarinet, 2 bassoons, contrabassoon, 4 horns in F, 3 trumpets in B♭, 3 trombones, tuba, timpani, side drum, cymbals, bass drum, and strings.

== Arrangements ==
In addition to the composer's orchestral and brass versions

- Military band, arr. Henry Geehl (1931), pub. Keith Prowse
- Organ, arr. Ivor Atkins as Elgar's Organ Sonata No. 2, Opus 87a (1933), pub. Keith Prowse
- Concert Band, trans. Alfred Reed (1973), pub. Sam Fox, Inc.

== Recordings ==
- The Severn Suite - 90th Anniversary Critical Edition Prof. Stephen Arthur Allen with the Princeton Brass band
