= Peter Nardone =

British conductor, singer, and composer

Peter Thomas Nardone BA FRCO (born 1965) is primarily a freelance conductor, singer and composer. He has sung with the Monteverdi Choir, The King’s Consort and the Tallis Scholars. He has been Director of Music at Chelmsford Cathedral and was subsequently Organist and Director of Music at Worcester Cathedral.

== Early life and education ==
Nardone was born in Elderslie, Scotland. He was educated at John Neilson High School, Paisley, before going on to study organ and piano at Royal Scottish Academy of Music and Drama (1983-1986). As a boy he sang in the choir of Paisley Abbey, where he continued as a countertenor until 1986. In 1986 was awarded a grant by the Countess of Munster Musical Trust to study singing at Royal Academy of Music, London.

He gained the FRCO diploma in 1999.

== Career ==
=== Organist & Conductor ===
In 1986 Nardone was appointed Assistant Organist at Croydon Parish Church, and in 1988 was made Assistant Organist at the Chapel Royal of St. Peter ad Vincula with HM Tower of London. In 1993 he was appointed Organist of Croydon Parish Church and in 2000 left to become Director of Music at Chelmsford Cathedral and Artistic Director of Chelmsford Cathedral Festival (2000-2007). In 2012 he became Organist and Director of Music at Worcester Cathedral and Artistic Director of Three Choirs Festival. As a conductor he has worked with The King’s Consort and the Philharmonia. He was also conductor of the Worcester Festival Choral Society.

=== Singer ===
From 1987 till 1995 Nardone sang with Monteverdi Choir and between 1987 and 2011 was a frequent singer with Tallis Scholars, The King’s Consort, The Taverner Consort and Players, the choir of The English Concert, the choir of The Orchestra of the Age of Enlightenment, The London Classical Players, The Gabrieli Consort, The Scottish Early Music Consort, Capella Nova and The Ensemble Gilles Binchois. From 1987 till 1994 he was the singing tutor at Harrow School.

== Awards and honours ==
- 1999 Fellow of the Royal College of Organists
- 2000 Associate of the Royal Academy of Music
- 2008 Honorary Fellowship of the Guild of Church Musicians
- 2010 Honorary Doctor of Arts Anglia Ruskin University

== Works ==
=== Published by Boosey & Hawkes ===
- Jubilate Deo
- Light of the lonely pilgrim’s heart
- Preces and Responses

=== Published by Royal School of Church Music ===
- And they shall protect thee
- Preces and Responses (upper voices)
- I give to you a new commandment
- The Lord at first did Adam make
- Mass of St.Cedd
- Kilcreggan Mass (2021)
- For the gifts of life and love

Cultural offices
Preceded by David Swinson	Organist of Croydon Parish Church; 1993-2000	Succeeded by Nigel McClintock
Preceded by Graham Elliott	Director of Music of Chelmsford Cathedral; 2000-2012	Succeeded by James Davy
Preceded by Adrian Lucas	Director of Music of Worcester Cathedral; 2012-2018	Succeeded by Samuel Hudson
