= Cambridge Philharmonic Society =

The Cambridge Philharmonic Society is one of the leading non-professional music societies in the UK, with orchestra and chorus regularly performing classical music concerts in Cambridge and the surrounding area. Although based in Cambridge, the Society is not specifically linked to the University, and members are traditionally drawn from a wide variety of backgrounds. The Cambridge Philharmonic aims to perform ambitious programmes, and has a long tradition of working with professional soloists. Its annual programme of concerts includes an operatic concert and a children's concert, and it regularly performs in venues such as King's College Chapel, Cambridge and Ely Cathedral. In recent years there have also been visits abroad, including performances at the Centre for Fine Arts, Brussels, the Rudolfinum, Prague and most recently the Concertgebouw, Amsterdam.

The history of the Philharmonic can be traced back to 1887 when Dr Arthur Henry Mann, the organist at King's College Chapel, Cambridge, assembled a choir with an accompanying orchestra for a festival service commemorating the Golden Jubilee of Queen Victoria. The singers subsequently became semi-permanent fixtures in the Cambridge music scene under the title of Dr Mann's Festival Chorus. However, by the early part of the 20th century the chorus was failing to attract audiences and Dr Mann resigned. This stimulated the chorus members to reinvent themselves, which they did under the new name of the Cambridge Choral Society. The new Society carried on the tradition of performing concerts in Cambridge until eventually, in 1924, it changed its name again, this time to the Cambridge Philharmonic Society. Shortly after, the chorus was joined by an orchestra in a fledgling version of the modern Society. However the new arrangement did not last long and there followed a period of decline which was only finally arrested by the appointment of Eric Congsby, a popular local conductor, under whom the Society was reconstituted in the late 1930s to include both orchestra and chorus in a format which continues to the present day.

== Conductors ==
- Arthur Henry Mann
- Eric Congsby
- Raymond Leppard
- Christopher Hogwood
- Harold Darke
- Boris Ord
- David Willcocks
- Martin West
- Timothy Redmond

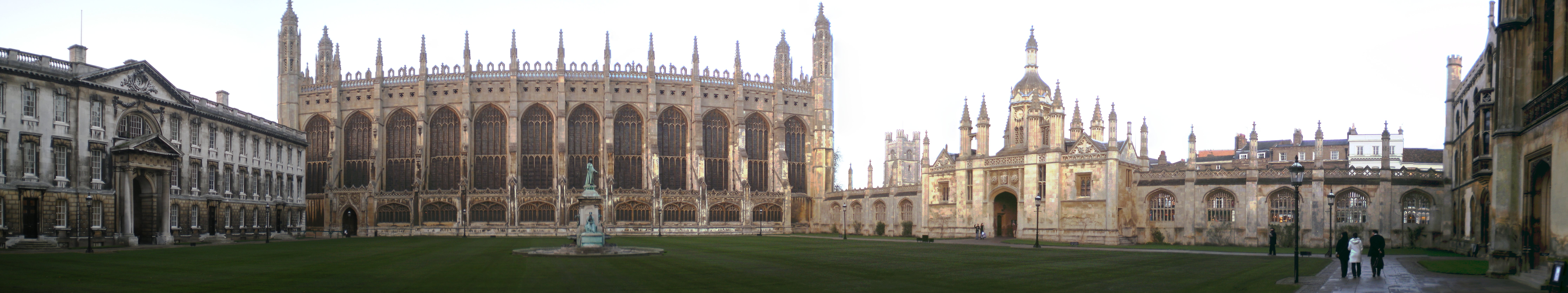
Great Court of King's College
