= Amner =

Amner is a surname. Notable people with the surname include:

- John Amner (1579–1641), English composer
- Ralph Amner (died 1664)
- Richard Amner (1736–1803), English divine
