= Jonathan Willcocks =

English composer and conductor

Jonathan Willcocks BEM
- Born: 9 January 1953
- Education: chorister at King's College
- Occupations: Conductor, composer
- Family: Sir David Willcocks (father)

Jonathan Peter Willcocks BEM (born 9 January 1953) is an English composer and conductor.

== Personal life and education ==
Willcocks was born in Worcester, the son of conductor and composer Sir David Willcocks. He was a chorister at King's College, Cambridge, and an Open Music Scholar at Clifton College. He graduated with an Honours degree in Music from the University of Cambridge in 1974, where he held a choral scholarship at Trinity College.

== Career ==
He served as director of music at The Portsmouth Grammar School from 1975 to 1978 and Bedales School, Petersfield between 1978 and 1989.

He is conductor and musical director of Guildford Choral Society and Chichester Singers, and of the professional chamber orchestra Southern Pro Musica. From 1998 to 2008 he was the director of the Junior Academy, Royal Academy of Music, London. In 2016, Willcocks was appointed Festival Conductor of the Leith Hill Musical Festival, the fifth since Ralph Vaughan Williams and succeeding Brian Kay, who held the post for 21 years. As a guest conductor, Willcocks has worked in USA, Canada, New Zealand, Australia, South Africa, Singapore and China. Venues have included Carnegie Hall, Gewandhaus, Perth Concert Hall, Australia, Royal Albert Hall, Royal Festival Hall and Symphony Hall, Birmingham.

Willcocks was awarded the British Empire Medal (BEM) in the 2024 New Year Honours for services to music.

=== Compositions ===
As a composer, his work has been nominated for the Academy of Composers and Songwriters’ prestigious British Composer Awards. His music is published by Oxford University Press. Works include:

- Voices of Time for baritone, SATB choir and chamber orchestra
- Great is the Glory for tenor, SATB choir and orchestra
- Australia concert overture for orchestra
