= Christopher Robinson (musician) =

English conductor and organist

Christopher John Robinson CVO CBE (born 20 April 1936) is an English conductor and organist.

After being organ scholar at Christ Church, Oxford, in 1963 he became Organist and Master of the Choristers at Worcester Cathedral. He was conductor of the City of Birmingham Choir between 1964 and 2002. In 1974, he became Organist and Choirmaster at St George's Chapel, Windsor Castle, a position he held until 1991.

He conducted the Oxford Bach Choir from 1976 to 1997. He became Organist and Director of Music at St John's College, Cambridge in 1991, leading the choir there until his retirement in 2003.

From 2015 to 2018, he was Mentor to the Organ Scholars at Downing College, Cambridge.

In 2023, Robinson was one of twelve composers asked to write new pieces for the coronation of Charles III and Camilla. In addition to composing a new descant for the congregational hymn Praise, my soul, the King of heaven, he composed a collection of fanfares that were performed by the fanfare trumpeters of the Royal Air Force, conducted by Wing Commander Piers Morrell.

Preceded by Douglas Guest	Organist, Worcester Cathedral; 1963–1974	Succeeded by Donald Hunt
Preceded by Meredith Davies	Conductor, City of Birmingham Choir; 1964–1991	Succeeded by Adrian Lucas
Preceded by Sidney Campbell	Director of Music, St George’s Chapel, Windsor Castle; 1974–1991	Succeeded by Jonathan Rees-Williams
Preceded by George Guest	Director of Music, St John's College, Cambridge; 1991–2003	Succeeded by David Hill
