= Adrian Lucas =

English organist, tutor and composer

Adrian Paul Lucas (born 1962) is an English organist, tutor and composer.

He became organist and director of music at Worcester Cathedral in 1996 and artistic director of the Worcester Three Choirs Festival. Previously he had been assistant organist at Norwich Cathedral (1983–1990) before becoming organist and master of the choristers at Portsmouth Cathedral (1990–1996).

Lucas was born in Essex in 1962, attended Southend High School for Boys and graduated from St John's College, Cambridge, where he was organ scholar from 1980 to 1983 under Dr George Guest. During this time he toured regularly with the chapel choir in France, the Netherlands, Germany, Belgium, Sweden, Greece, and Australia. He also recorded a number of discs whilst at St Johns, including repertoire by Allegri, Gibbons, and Titelouze.

Whilst at Norwich, he taught piano and organ for the University of East Anglia and was a member of the music staff at both Norwich High School and Norwich School. He was musical director of the Wymondham Choir (a 50-strong freelance choir of men and boys) with whom he toured, performing in multiple English cathedrals as well as a concert tour in and around Koblenz in Germany. He also co-presented the radio programme Norfolk Arts for the local radio station BBC Radio Norfolk.

During his time at Portsmouth, he was responsible for the building of the new Nicholson & Co (Worcester) Ltd organ (1994), as well as directing the cathedral choir in the drumhead service to commemorate the 50th anniversary of D-Day. During this time, he also conducted the choir for multiple broadcasts on both TV and radio and recorded their first ever CD with Priory Records.

Whilst at Worcester Cathedral, he made several recordings with the cathedral choir, as well as launching the Great Cathedral Organ series for Regent Records. In 2008 a major project was completed when the new Kenneth Tickell organ came into service in the quire of the cathedral. His first recording on the new instrument included the Julius Reubke Sonata and Louis Vierne's First Symphony. He also conducted the Worcester Festival Choral Society

At the end of 2011 he left his cathedral post to work as a freelance organist, conductor and composer, as well as starting up his own recording company, Acclaim Productions. On 16 June 2018 he returns to his old school to give a recital on its newly-rebuilt organ.

Cultural offices
Preceded by Anthony Froggatt	Organist and Master of the Choristers of Portsmouth Cathedral; 1990–1996	Succeeded by David Price
Preceded by Donald Hunt	Organist and Master of the Choristers of Worcester Cathedral; 1996–2011	Succeeded by Peter Nardone

== Sources ==
- Who's Who, 2008. ISBN 978-0-7136-8550-3.
