= David Willcocks =

British choral conductor (1919–2015)

Sir David Willcocks CBE MC
- David Willcocks in Belfast, September 2006 with "Melisma"
- Born: David Valentine Willcocks; 30 December 1919; Newquay, Cornwall, England
- Died: 17 September 2015 (aged 95); Cambridge, Cambridgeshire, England
- Occupations: Choral conductor; Organist; Composer; College director; Army Officer
- Organisations: Choir of King's College, Cambridge; The Bach Choir; City of Bath Bach Choir; Royal College of Music; British Army

Sir David Valentine Willcocks (30 December 1919 – 17 September 2015) was a British choral conductor, organist, composer and music administrator. He was particularly well known for his association with the Choir of King's College, Cambridge, which he directed from 1957 to 1974, making frequent broadcasts and recordings. Several of the descants and carol arrangements he wrote for the annual service of Nine Lessons and Carols were published in the series of books Carols for Choirs which he edited along with Reginald Jacques and John Rutter. He was also director of the Royal College of Music in London.

During the Second World War (1939–1945) he served as an officer in the British Army, and was decorated with the Military Cross for his actions on Hill 112 during the Battle of Normandy in July 1944. His elder son, Jonathan Willcocks, is also a composer.

== Biography ==
Born in Newquay in Cornwall, Willcocks began his musical training as a chorister at Westminster Abbey from 1929 to 1934, following a recommendation by the then Master of the King's Music, Sir Henry Walford Davies, to Ernest Bullock. From 1934 to 1938, he was a music scholar at Clifton College, Bristol, where his teacher was Douglas Fox, his most important musical influence. He was appointed as organ scholar at King's College, Cambridge, in 1939. There, he met David Briggs, a choral scholar (bass). Willcocks and Briggs would later be colleagues at King's, from 1959 to 1974, as Organist and Master of the Choristers and as Headmaster of King's College School, the school attended by the choirboys of King's College.

=== Military service ===
With the outbreak of the Second World War, he interrupted his studies in music to serve in the British Army. He was commissioned as a second lieutenant in the Duke of Cornwall's Light Infantry (DCLI) on 15 February 1941, and was awarded the Military Cross as a temporary captain for his actions during the Battle of Normandy on the night of 10/11 July 1944, when he was serving with the 5th Battalion, DCLI as battalion intelligence officer. The battalion, part of the 214th Infantry Brigade of the 43rd (Wessex) Infantry Division, was ordered to hold Hill 112 in Normandy, France, as part of Operation Epsom. He carried out his duties outstandingly overnight, helping inflict severe casualties on the German forces by calling in artillery support to break up counter-attacks. The battalion suffered over 250 casualties during the night, including the commanding officer and one of the company commanders. This left Willcocks in command of the battalion headquarters, which by then was the farthest forward part of the battalion. He rallied the men, enabling the battalion to stand firm and reorganise. The award was gazetted on 21 December 1944.

=== Musical career ===
Willcocks returned to Cambridge in 1945 to complete his studies, and in 1947 was elected a Fellow of King's College and appointed Conductor of the Cambridge Philharmonic Society. In the same year, he became the organist at Salisbury Cathedral and the conductor of the Salisbury Musical Society. He moved to Worcester Cathedral in 1950 and remained until 1957, during which time he was organist of the cathedral, principal conductor of the Three Choirs Festival in 1951, 1954, and 1957, and conductor of the City of Birmingham Choir. From 1956 to 1974 he was also conductor of the Bradford Festival Choral Society, while continuing as guest conductor for their carol concerts into the early 1990s. Composers with whom he collaborated include Vaughan Williams, Britten, Howells, and Tippett.

From 1957 to 1974 he held the post for which he is probably best known, Director of Music at King's College, Cambridge. He made numerous recordings with the college choir. Among the most notable recordings was one of Thomas Tallis's Spem in alium, made in 1965. The choir toured extensively, giving concerts worldwide, as well as garnering further acclaim internationally through television and radio appearances. Under the baton of Willcocks, Cambridge University Musical Society performed Benjamin Britten's War Requiem in 1963 in (Perugia) Milan, La Scala, and in Venice. The choir subsequently performed the work in Japan, Hong Kong, Portugal, and the Netherlands. In 1960, he also became the musical director of the Bach Choir in London.

He held these positions at Cambridge until the 1970s when he accepted the post of Director of the Royal College of Music. In the 1971 Queen's Birthday Honours, he was appointed a Commander of the Order of the British Empire (CBE), and was created a Knight Bachelor in 1977 in the Queen's Silver Jubilee Honours. He held honorary degrees in England from the Universities of Bradford, Bristol, Exeter, Leicester, and Sussex, and from the Royal College of Music in London; in the US from Luther College (Iowa), St. Olaf College (Minnesota), Rowan University, and Westminster Choir College (New Jersey); and in Canada from Trinity College, Toronto, and the University of Victoria. In all, his honorary degrees numbered more than fifty. He was also president of the City of Bath Bach Choir and Exeter Festival Chorus. For the 1981 wedding of Prince Charles and Diana Spencer, Willcocks served as guest director of music and conducted the Bach Choir, which sang during the signing of the registers. The event was watched by a global TV audience estimated at 750 million.

After stepping down from the Royal College, Willcocks resumed conducting and editing scores as his primary activities. A 1990 profile in The New York Times noted that he had made nine visits to the United States in the previous year, including conducting Evensong at St. Thomas Church in Manhattan and conducting the Mormon Tabernacle Choir. In live performance, he regularly conducted Mozart's Requiem at the Mostly Mozart festival in New York.

On 15 May 2010, a celebration of his contribution to music took place at the Royal Albert Hall in London, where pieces selected by Willcocks were performed by singers who are part of the Really Big Chorus. Special guests included choristers from King's College Choir, Cambridge, who performed three pieces.

He died at home in Cambridge on the morning of 17 September 2015.

== Recordings and broadcasts ==
Willcocks made recordings with the (London) Bach Choir, the English Chamber Orchestra, the Academy of St Martin in the Fields, the Jacques Orchestra, the Philharmonia Orchestra, and the London Symphony Orchestra as well as with the Choir of King's College, Cambridge, with whom he regularly conducted the Nine Lessons and Carols service on Christmas Eve, broadcast by the BBC every year since 1931. With The Bach Choir, in particular he recorded works by Johann Sebastian Bach, especially his motets and, sung in English, his St John Passion and a stately rendition of the St Matthew Passion, a piece he regularly conducted for broadcast Easter performances. He also served as general editor of the Church Music series of the Oxford University Press. During his years at King's, an early and frequently reissued recording of the Allegri Miserere was made in March 1963 by the choir, conducted by David Willcocks, and featuring 12-year-old Roy Goodman, later a distinguished conductor, as the treble soloist. In 1965, Willcocks made his famous recording, with the Choir of King's College, of Tallis's Spem in alium.

He is particularly known for his widely used choral arrangements of Christmas carols, many of which were originally written or arranged for the Service of Nine Lessons and Carols at King's or the Bach Choir's Christmas concerts. They are published in the five Carols for Choirs anthologies (1961–1987), edited by Willcocks with Reginald Jacques (first volume) or John Rutter. The descant arrangements in particular are among the most famous and well-loved musical components. He was Music Director Emeritus of King's College Choir, and an Honorary Fellow of King's College, Cambridge.

Outside the world of classical music, Willcocks conducted his London Bach Choir for the studio recording of "You Can't Always Get What You Want" by the Rolling Stones in 1968.

A notable broadcast took place on BBC Radio 4 on 21 September 2010 in a series called Soul Music, when Willcocks profiled Fauré's Requiem. The programme included his memories of the fighting at Hill 112. The profile also featured Christina, widow of Olaf Schmid. Willcocks questioned the morality of war.

== Selected Compositions ==
- Five Folksongs (1972)
- Introduction (Fanfare), Variations and Fughetto on the Hymn Tune Jena (Breslau) (1986). Commissioned by the Detroit chapter of the American Guild of Organists, premiered by Marilyn Mason at the 1986 AGO national convention.
- A Ceremony of Psalms (1989)
- Tomorrow shall be my dancing day

== Honours ==
=== Commonwealth honours ===
Commonwealth honours

Country	Date of award	Appointment	Post-nominal letters
United Kingdom	1971	Commander of the Order of the British Empire	CBE
United Kingdom	1977	Knight Bachelor	Kt

Military decorations

Country	Date of award	Decoration	Post-nominal letters
United Kingdom	21 December 1944	Military Cross	MC
United Kingdom		1939-45 Star	
United Kingdom		France and Germany Star	
United Kingdom		Defence Medal	
United Kingdom		War Medal	

=== Scholastic ===
Fellowships

Location	Date of award	School	Position
England	1938	Royal College of Organists	Fellow (FRCO)
England	1947	King's College, Cambridge	Fellow
England	1965	Royal Academy of Music	Honorary Fellow (FRAM)
England	1965	Royal School of Church Music	Fellow (FRSCM)
Canada	1967	Royal Canadian College of Organists	Fellow (FRCCO)
England	1971	Royal College of Music	Fellow (FRCM)
England	1976	Trinity College London	Honorary Fellow (HonFTCL)
England	1977	Royal Northern College of Music	Fellow (FRNCM)
England	1979	King's College Cambridge	Honorary Fellow
England	1980	Guildhall School of Music	Honorary Fellow (FGSM)
Scotland	1982	Royal Scottish Academy of Music and Drama	Fellow (FRSAMD)
England	2012	Falmouth University	Honorary Fellow

Honorary degrees

Location	Date of award	School	Degree	Gave Commencement Address
England	1976	University of Exeter	Doctor of Music (D.Mus.)	
England	1977	University of Leicester	Doctor of Music (D.Mus.)	
USA	1980	Westminster Choir College, Princeton	Doctor of Music (D.Mus.)	
England	1981	University of Bristol	Doctor of Music (D.Mus.)	
England	1982	University of Sussex	Doctor of Letters (D.Litt.)	
Canada	1985	Trinity College, Toronto	Doctor of Sacred Letters	

Cultural offices
Preceded by Walter Galpin Alcock	Organist and Master of the Choristers of Salisbury Cathedral; 1947–1950	Succeeded by Douglas Albert Guest
Preceded by Ivor Atkins	Organist and Master of the Choristers of Worcester Cathedral; 1950–1957	Succeeded by Douglas Albert Guest
Preceded by Boris Ord	Director of Music, King's College, Cambridge; 1957–1974	Succeeded by Sir Philip Ledger
Preceded by Sir Keith Falkner	Director of the Royal College of Music; 1974–1984	Succeeded by Michael Gough Matthews
