= Douglas Guest =

British musician (1916–1996)

Douglas Albert Guest CVO (9 May 1916 – 18 November 1996) was an English organist, conductor, teacher and composer best known for his 1971 anthem for remembrance, For the Fallen.

== Education ==
Guest was born in Mortomley, Sheffield, Yorkshire, England. He was educated at Reading School, Berkshire from 1929 to 1933. He went on to study at the Royal College of Music from 1933 to 1935 where he studied with Sir Ernest Bullock, among others. He became Organ Scholar of King's College, Cambridge from 1935 until 1939.

== Career ==
During the Second World War he served as a Major in the Royal Artillery and was involved in the battle for the liberation of Caen, Normandy. He was 'twice severely wounded' sustaining a leg injury which left him with a permanent, though eventually slight limp. His first major appointment came in 1945 as Director of Music at Uppingham School. From there he became Organist of Salisbury Cathedral, a post which he held from 1950 until 1957, before moving to become Organist and Master of the Choristers at Worcester Cathedral. His final post was as Organist and Master of the Choristers at Westminster Abbey from 1963 until 1981.

== Compositions and awards ==
His most well-known composition is a setting of Lawrence Binyon's poem, "For the Fallen", composed in 1971 for the Choir of Westminster Abbey. He also composed music for the organ, including a Voluntary for Easter, composed in 1956. The following year, he wrote Missa brevis. His other appointments have included being professor at the Royal College of Music (1963-1981), and as an examiner for both the Royal College of Organists and the Associated Board of the Royal Schools of Music. In 1975 he was appointed CVO.

Cultural offices
| Preceded by David Willcocks | Organist and Master of the Choristers of Salisbury Cathedral; 1950-1957 | Succeeded by Christopher Hugh Dearnley |
| Preceded by David Willcocks | Organist and Master of the Choristers of Worcester Cathedral; 1957-1963 | Succeeded by Christopher Robinson |
| Preceded by William McKie | Organist and Master of the Choristers of Westminster Abbey; 1963–1981 | Succeeded by Simon Preston |
