= The Black Knight (Elgar) =

Symphony/cantata written by Edward Elgar in 1889-1893

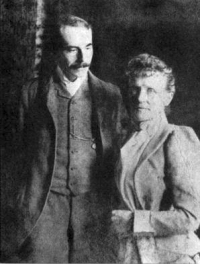
Edward and Alice Elgar, c. 1891

The Black Knight, Op. 25 is a symphony/cantata for orchestra and chorus written by Edward Elgar in 1889–93. The librettist borrows from Longfellow's translation of the ballad Der schwarze Ritter by Ludwig Uhland.

Elgar was motivated to complete work on The Black Knight when offered a performance at the Worcester Festival. Cantatas were favoured by choral societies of the time. However, Elgar's desire to organize the loose format of the cantata by shaping it to a more rigid form is apparent. For example, he divides the text into four contrasting scenes corresponding to the four movements of a typical symphony. Basil Maine, a leading Elgar biographer, believes the purpose of the work is to create a close mix of vocal and instrumental tones.

== Synopsis ==
Elgar's The Black Knight tells the story of the intrusion of a mysterious stranger into a king's court with disastrous and gruesome result.

It starts with a medieval jousting competition held in honor of the feast of Pentecost: in the competition, the king's son beats everyone in the lists until a mysterious knight arrives and challenges him, and with the sky darkening and the castle rocking, the strange knight fights and wins. Later that evening, during the banquet, the black knight returns to ask the king if he can marry his daughter and begins to dance with her, and as they dance, the little flowers in her hair mysteriously die. Later, noticing the paleness of the king's two children, the guest offers 'healing' wine to them, who collapse and die soon after drinking the poison. The old king begs the knight to kill him as he has nothing left to live for, but he refuses.

Music writer Diana McVeagh observes that there seems to be no moral cause or explanation for the gratuitous evil of the stranger.

== Musical analysis ==
Elgar described the work as a 'symphony for chorus and orchestra', though the publishers, Novello, described it as a cantata. The four scenes correspond to the four movements of the classical symphony. There are no soloists, and the action is described by the chorus.

In the first scene, "The Tournament", Edward Elgar uses a buoyant, "open-air" theme to depict the happy crowd at the tournament. Here the composer uses a triplet figure that falls on the third beat.

The second scene begins with the orchestra playing softly. The orchestra then begins to play the knight's theme louder as he appears. Throughout the scene, the composer uses a number of diminished sevenths which represent the knight and foreshadow the disastrous events to come. The chorus, representing the crowd, demands to know the knight's name, and there is a moment of silence before the knight answers.

In the "Dance", the themes are light and graceful. Initially, the chorus enters to describe the king's feast, but the music changes as the black knight's theme replays as he enters the hall. During the knight's dance with the king's daughter, his theme becomes chaotic: for example, the orchestra replays the original diminished seventh again as the flower in her hair died.

"The Banquet" begins frantically as the knight proposes a toast. Then, as the children die, the orchestra calms and plays softly. Abruptly the chorus and the king erupt with a dramatic cry as the children die. The knight's refusal to kill the king is portrayed by unaccompanied voices. The piece ends dramatically with the return of variations on the knight's theme at forte. At the last seven measures, only two instruments play and the sound dies away.

== Composition ==
Many believe the composer considers the chorus less important than the orchestra. For example, the chorus borrows the orchestra's tunes or will often double the orchestra. The words are often weakly placed and do not seem as important as the underlying music. "Words serve a mechanical purpose ... [there is] no good reason why they should not be removed". The orchestral writing, however, is competent and characteristic. For example, fear at the Black Knight is expressed by harmonic sequences and appoggiaturas which resolve downward. The composer also uses Neapolitan sixth chords to express the wickedness of the knight. Due to this unexpected compositional technique, The Black Knight is still performed all over the world.
