= William Done =

English cathedral organist

William Done (4 October 1815 – 17 August 1895) was an English cathedral organist, who served at Worcester Cathedral

== Background ==
He was born in Worcester on 4 October 1815, the son of a baker. He was a chorister at Worcester Cathedral from 1825 (under Charles E. J. Clarke, the cathedral organist), then an articled pupil of Clarke from 1828 to 1835, and then Clarke's deputy organist. When Clarke died in 1844, Done succeeded him as organist.

He remained organist for 51 years. One of his pupils was William Wolstenholme. In 1894, after 50 years of service, he was awarded the Lambeth degree of D.Mus.

In 1889, Done (by this stage in his seventies) handed his duties to the Assistant Organist Hugh Blair, but remained titular Organist until his death in 1895, whereupon Blair succeeded him.

Cultural offices
Preceded by Charles E. J. Clarke	Organist and Master of the Choristers of Worcester Cathedral; 1844-1895	Succeeded by Hugh Blair
