= Donald Hunt (musician) =

English musician and conductor (1930–2018)

Donald Frederick Hunt OBE (26 July 1930 – 4 August 2018) was an English musician, from Gloucester. He was a distinguished English choral conductor, having made his conducting debut with the Halifax Choral Society in 1957.

As a boy, Hunt was a chorister at Gloucester Cathedral, and became assistant to the organist Herbert Sumsion in his teens. From 1954 to 1957 he was organist at St John's Church, Torquay. He was later awarded a doctorate from Leeds University (1975) honoris causa, and from 1958 until 1975 he was organist and choirmaster at Leeds Parish Church, whilst concurrently holding positions with the Leeds Philharmonic Society, Halifax Choral Society, Huddersfield Glee & Madrigal Society and Leeds Festival Chorus. He was also Leeds City Organist, and lectured at Leeds College of Music.

In 1976 he became master of choristers and organist at Worcester Cathedral, where he served until 1996. He was associated with the Three Choirs Festival and served as its artistic director and conductor eight times in the period from 1975 to 1996. In 1993 he was awarded an OBE. After he left Worcester Cathedral in 1996 he served as principal of the Elgar School of Music in Worcester (becoming music advisor after 2007) and leading many choral performances. He died on 4 August 2018 at the age of 88.

Hunt was closely associated with the Elgar Society. His published books include studies of Edward Elgar and Samuel Sebastian Wesley. His many recordings included works by Elgar and other British composers such as Charles Villiers Stanford and Herbert Howells.

Cultural offices
Preceded by Christopher Robinson	Organist and Master of the Choristers of Worcester Cathedral; 1974–1996	Succeeded by Adrian Lucas
