= Bath Bach Choir =

UK classical music choir

- Choir
- Origin: Bath, Somerset, England
- Founded: October 1946
- Members: about 100
- Music director: Benedict Collins Rice
- Website: www.bathbachchoir.org.uk

Bath Bach Choir, formerly The City of Bath Bach Choir (CBBC), is based in Bath, Somerset, England, and is a registered charity. Founded in 1946 by Cuthbert Bates, who also became a founding father of the Bath Bach Festival in 1950, the choir's original aim was to promote the music of Johann Sebastian Bach via periodic music festivals. Bates – an amateur musician with a great love and understanding of this composer's works – was also the CBBC's principal conductor and continued in this role until his sudden death, in April 1980. This untimely exit pre-empted his planned retirement concert performance of J. S. Bach's Mass in B minor, scheduled for July of the same year, and effectively ended the first period of the choir's history.

Distinguished Handel scholar Denys Darlow succeeded Cuthbert Bates as musical director in 1980 and remained in the post until 1990. He was followed by Nigel Perrin, who remained musical director until December 2022. Perrin began his musical life as a chorister at Ely Cathedral, then won a choral scholarship to King's College, Cambridge, studying under Sir David Willcocks. In 1970 he also joined the newly formed King's Singers, having sung with them on an occasional basis after graduation in the summer of 1969, and thereafter entertaining the world throughout the 1970s as the highest voice (counter-tenor) of the irrepressible and ground-breaking vocal group.

In 2023, Benedict Collins Rice was appointed music director, only the fourth in 75 years. Originally from Oxfordshire, Collins Rice held two conducting scholarships at the University of Cambridge before continuing his studies with the Heads of Conducting at the Royal College of Music, the Royal Northern College of Music, the University of Music and Performing Arts Vienna and the University of Birmingham where he studied under Simon Halsey. Performing throughout Europe and the US, he has recorded for several labels, broadcast live on BBC Radio 3, and founded a chamber group, The Facade Ensemble.

The first president of the CBBC was Dr Ralph Vaughan Williams until 1958. Sir Arthur Bliss, then Master of the Queen's Music (Musik), took over as president in 1959, followed in 1975 by Sir David Willcocks, until 2015. In 2016 David Hill, musical director of The Bach Choir, was elected president of Bath Bach Choir, and Jonathan Willcocks a vice president.

== Overview ==
The Bath Bach Choir is a member of the Cultural Forum for the Bath area that performs choral works in the UK and overseas. Membership is governed by audition. The choir performs two major orchestral concerts annually with a lighter concert in the summer. Most take place at Bath Abbey but other venues include Exeter Cathedral, The Forum, Bath, the Michael Tippett Centre, the Wiltshire Music Centre, the Roper Theatre, and Hayesfield Girls' School.

Recent performances have included Sergei Rachmaninov, All-Night Vigil (Rachmaninoff), J.S Bach's St Matthew Passion and Mass in B minor, Mass in Blue by Will Todd, accompanied by the composer, Elis Pehkonen's Russian Requiem, also in the composer's presence, works by Sir Karl Jenkins and Sir James MacMillan's St John Passion who attend the concert performed in Wells Cathedral. The choir's 60th Anniversary Concert, in the Wiltshire Music Centre in 2007, comprised a newly commissioned work by Ed Hughes, called Song for St Cecilia.

The choir tours abroad: Karl Jenkins’ Requiem was performed at Carnegie Hall, New York, in 2008, and concerts have taken place at Cathédrale Notre-Dame de Chartres, Paris, and in Hungary, Belgium and Germany. In 2009 the choir was invited to perform in the famous Thomaskirche, where Johann Sebastian Bach was once choirmaster, Aix-en-Provence, in 2013, and the Bath Bach Choir's most recent tour to Barcelona: Barcelona Cathedral, Sagrada Família, Santa Maria del Mar, Barcelona in 2015.

Today, referred to as the Bath Bach Choir, the choir comprises about 100 committed singers from Bath and its environs, such as Frome, drawn from all walks of life. The choir maintains an active list of patrons and friends who support its musical work in return for a range of related benefits.

== The early years 1946–1980 ==
The City of Bath Bach Choir gave its inaugural concert in June 1947 in Bath Abbey, performing J. S. Bach's Mass in B minor. Cuthert Bates chose Alan Bennett, then head of music at City of Bath Boys' School (today Beechen Cliff School), to take on the roles of collaborator, assistant musical director and assistant director of the Bath Bach Festivals; the distinguished composer Dr. Ralph Vaughan Williams was appointed as president. In December 1947 the choir gave its first Carols by Candlelight concert in the historic Grand Pump Room, Bath, at which the choir displayed versatility and musicianship by introducing new carols and arrangements as well as old favourites for audience participation. These annual Christmas concerts continue to this day.

A year after his death, in August 1958, Vaughan Williams was succeeded as president by Sir Arthur Bliss, Master of the Queen's Music. Sir Arthur died on 27 March 1975 and was replaced in July 1975 by distinguished choral musician and current president Sir David Willcocks, then famous for his work as the director of music at King's College, Cambridge, who had recently been appointed director of the Royal College of Music.

The first Bath Bach Festival, in October 1950, commemorated the bicentenary of the eponymous composer's death and was a great success. A further seven festivals were held at approximately four-year intervals until 1982 but the eighth was a financial disaster and indicated the end of an era. However, in 1995 the Bath Bach Festival tradition was revived by Elizabeth Bates, Cuthbert Bates' daughter, and periodic Bach Festivals continued in Bath under her direction until October 2010. A new mini-Bath Bachfest was initiated in February 2012, sponsored by the Bath Mozartfest Charitable Trust.

In its first 35 years the City of Bath Bach Choir gave many performances of Bach's major choral works, including its signature work – the Mass in B minor – as well as the St Matthew Passion, St. John Passion, Christmas Oratorio and numerous cantatas and motets. Other European composers were also represented, since choir policy has always been to explore lesser-known masterpieces in addition to popular choral repertoire. The choir gave one of the first modern performances of the Claudio Monteverdi Vespers of 1610, and other concerts included works by Bononcini, Francesco Cavalli, Antonio Vivaldi, Heinrich Schütz, Marc-Antoine Charpentier, Camille Saint-Saëns, Gustav Holst, Anton Bruckner and William Walton. In October 1966, they gave one of the first UK performances of the Duruflé Requiem in Bath. Michael Tippett's oratorio A Child of our Time was sung under the composer's baton as a part of the Bath Festival in June 1968. During this period the works of Ralph Vaughan Williams, the choir's first president, also featured strongly. From the beginning, the choir strove to obtain the highest quality professional support from professional orchestras such as the London Symphony Orchestra, Royal Philharmonic Orchestra and Boyd Neel Orchestra, though during the 1970s rising costs necessitated a modification of this practice. Similar attention was also given to the selection and engagement of solo singers such as Kathleen Ferrier, Dame Janet Baker, Margaret Cable, Wendy Eathorne, Eric Greene and John Shirley-Quick. Meanwhile, notable conductors included Ralph Vaughan Williams, Josef Krips (who was so impressed by a performance of Haydn's The Creation with the London Symphony Orchestra that he repeated it at the Royal Festival Hall, London), Yehudi Menuhin, Basil Cameron, Reginald Jaques, Nadia Boulanger, Charles Groves, István Kertész and Sir David Willcocks.

Unaccompanied pieces were not neglected. There were frequent recitals and serenade concerts in which a wide field of music was explored from the sixteenth century school to the present day.

== The next decade 1980–1990 ==
The City of Bath Bach Choir had planned to appoint Denys Darlow to replace Cuthbert Bates on his retirement. He had played the harpsichord continuo at a number of Bath Bach Festivals in the preceding years, was well known to the choir and sympathised with its aims. However, after the latter's unexpected death and in recognition of Bates's long and distinguished service, Sir David Willcocks conducted the July 1980 performance of Bach's Mass in B minor as a tribute and memorial. Darlow took over thereafter and at the time of his appointment was a senior professor at the Royal College of Music, director of music at St George's Church, Hanover Square, London, and had for many years been director of the Tilford Bach Festival and London Handel Festival.

The choir spent the next ten years moving forward from the Bach Festival legacy and building on its reputation for exploring works in the choral canon. Stephen Dodgson's Te Deum was performed in October 1982 as a part of the last Bach Festival at which the choir sung. Beethoven's Missa Solemnis was performed in 1982, the last time this work was heard in Bath. The choir continued to perform two major orchestral concerts each year as well as a 'lighter' summer concert and three seasonal performances of Carols by Candlelight. In April 1986 the choir gave the first performance of Denys Darlow's own Requiem, dedicated to the City of Bath Bach Choir itself.

From 1988 onwards, summer concerts were moved from Bath Abbey to the Michael Tippett Centre at Bath Spa University. In 1988 and 1989 these were conducted by Marcus Sealy, who joined the choir in January 1982 as Accompanist and Deputy Musical Director and remains in that post today. From 1987 to 1989 the carols concerts were conducted by Cuthbert's daughter, Elizabeth and attracted steadily increasing audiences. Denys Darlow died on 24 February 2015 aged 94.

== Modern era: 1990–present ==
On 8 January 1990 Nigel Perrin took on the role of director of music for the City of Bath Bach Choir. As one of The King's Singers, Perrin had sung all over the world with artists such as Kiri Te Kanawa and Sir Cliff Richard. Appointing a singer as musical director was a break from tradition but Perrin brought insight into the mechanics and techniques of choral singing and a determination to lead the choir to even higher professional standards. His first concert was Monteverdi's Vespers of 1610 in Bath Abbey in April 1990. In 2023, Benedict Collins Rice was appointed music director.

The choir continues to explore new and unusual works and notably gave a performance of David Fanshawe's African Sanctus and Diana Burrell's Benedicam Dominum, a work which enabled Marcus Sealy to demonstrate the magnificent new Klais organ in Bath Abbey. The choir performed Requiem Aeternam by Jonathan Lloyd in the presence of the composer, which necessitated synchronising with a pre-recorded backing track. More recently, performance of two 'cross-over' works by Karl Jenkins – The Armed Man and Requiem – stretched the boundaries of CBBC singers' experience.

Modernism does not mean that the choir has neglected its roots and it often returns to the music of J. S. Bach. In April 1997 the choir gave a performance of the Mass in B minor in Bath Abbey under the baton of its president, Sir David Willcocks, to mark its 50th anniversary celebrations and, more controversially, gave a semi-staged and critically acclaimed performance of the St John Passion in The Forum, Bath in April 2005, using lighting and moving images, and later as noted in the histogram of performances.

Over the years the choir has also travelled widely and developed relationships with singers in Bath's twin cities in Hungary, the Béla Viká Choir, and in Braunschweig (Brunswick), Germany with the Cathedral Dom Chor; and with Les Bengalis de Liège in Liège, Belgium. Braunschweig was heavily bombed by the allies on the nights of 14 and 15 October 1944, which inflicted substantial damage to the Dom (cathedral), and many people died. In October 2004 the CBBC was invited to join the Dom Chor in a performance of Benjamin Britten's War Requiem in the presence of HM Ambassador to Germany, HE Sir Peter Torry. This concert, at the Dom, was a centrepiece of the city's commemoration and an act of remembrance and reconciliation. In 2009 the choir travelled to perform in Bach's own church, the Thomaskirche in Leipzig, and in October 2011 they toured to Rome, performing in both La Chiesa di Sant'Agnese in Agone, and The Venerable English College (colloquially referred to as English College, Rome), founded in 1579 by William Allen.

Carols by Candlelight concerts routinely occur in December each year, which from 2001 – 2012 included a performance by the choir's junior section, formed and led by Nigel Perrin and sponsored by the CBBC for more than a decade, 'to sow a seed for what may be to come in the future'. The City of Bath Bach Junior Choir enabled children from 8–15 years to sing together and learn basic musical techniques and at its height it had some 50 or more singers. In 2008 Simon Carr-Minns took the baton from Perrin, who handed it to Adrienne Hale in 2009, and two years later it passed Jamie Knights. The children, in distinctive purple T-shirts, gave regular charity performances. They helped to raise £4,200 for the Royal United Hospital in Bath and, in 2010, raised money for the 'Afghan Heroes Charity' through their vocals and accompanying video for Forever Young – a Song For Wootton Bassett, written by Alan Pettifer and commissioned as a tribute to the people of Royal Wootton Bassett for their support of UK Armed Forces repatriation. With numbers dwindling as more and more opportunities for choral work were being offered to local children, the decision was taken to wind up the programme, and they gave their final performance in 2012. However, an opportunity for talented young musicians is still provided as an interlude during the Carol concerts, principally performed by exceptional music students from Wells Cathedral School.

The Bath Bach Choir's biggest recent challenge – supported by the combined forces of Exeter Festival Chorus and The Wellensian Consort– was arguably staging two performances of The Saint John Passion, an exceptionally demanding contemporary piece composed by Sir James MacMillan and sung in his presence. Performances took place at Wells Cathedral and then Exeter Cathedral in March 2013, with soloist Mark Stone as Christus, and Alexander Hohenthal leading the Southern Sinfonia. The baroque performance of Handel' Messiah (Handel), accompanied by Music for Awhile, with leader Margaret Faultless, a musician within the Orchestra of the Age of Enlightenment, went down especially well with the packed audience. Consequent upon Coronavirus (COVID-19) in 2020, and UK Government restrictions on live concerts, the choir produced three 'virtual performances' of singular works. The choir returned to Bath Abbey for a live concert, socially distanced, presented to a restricted but, judging by the request for an encore, most appreciative audience of 150 people on 3 July 2021. Since Benedict Collins Rice became director of music the choir has embarked on performing more a capella works. Most recently Bath Bach Choir and Bury Bath Choir, both directed by Benedict Collins Rice, collaborated for the first time to perform the biblical epic Belshazzar's Feast with renowned soloists Roderick Williams and Sir Willard White.

== Performance chronology ==
Date	Composer	Work	Venue
4 July 2026	William Walton, Hubert Parry	Belshazzar's Feast. Coronation Te Deum, I was glad, Blest Pair of Sirens Sir Willard White, Southern Sinfonia, Marcus Sealy organ, Benedict Collins Rice conductor.	Bath Abbey
13 Jun 2026	William Walton, Hubert Parry	Belshazzar's Feast. Coronation Te Deum, I was glad, Blest Pair of Sirens Roderick Williams, Southern Sinfonia, Marcus Sealy organ, Benedict Collins Rice conductor.	St Edmundsbury Cathedral
28 Mar 2026	Pärt, J S Bach	Passio. Jesu, meine Freude The Facade Ensemble, Marcus Sealy organ, Benedict Collins Rice conductor.	Christ Church, Bath
18/19 Dec 2025	Various	Carols by Candlelight – 78th Season	Pump Room, Bath
1 Nov 2025	Carl Orff	Carmina Burana. Ana Beard Fernández soprano, Ashley Harries tenor, Hugo Herman-Wilson baritone, Backbeat Percussion Quartet percussion, Thomas Kelly piano, Marcus Sealy piano, Benedict Collins Rice conductor.	Kingswood School Theatre, Bath
12 Jul 2025	Charles Ives, Bernstein, Lili Boulanger	A Celebration of Psalms. Psalm 90, Chichester Psalms, Psalm 130, Psalm 24. Harp Cecily Beer, Organ Jonathan Hope, Percussion Iolo Edwards, Treble Hugo Walkom. The Facade Ensemple. Benedict Collins Rice conductor.	St Mary the Virgin's Church, Bathwick
8 Mar 2025	Esenvalds, Beethoven	A Shadow. Symphony No. 9 'Choral'. Lilo Evans soprano, Bethan Langford mezzo-soprano, Alex Sprague tenor, Paul Carey Jones bass. Eugene Monteith and Adam Laughton conductors.	The Forum, Bath, Bath, Somerset
19/20 Dec 2024	Various	Carols by Candlelight – 77th Season	Pump Room, Bath,
2 Nov 2024	Rheinberger	Evening Star: Cantus Missae Mass for double choir in E flat, Op. 109, Motets for Advent, Heimweh, "Abendlied", Zum neuen Jahr, Morgenstern der finstern Nacht, Abendfriede, Movements from four organ sonatas, Marcus Sealy organ, Benedict Collins Rice conductor	St Mary the Virgin's Church, Bathwick
6 Jul 2024	J S Bach, Marianna Martines	LAUDATE! Magnificat in D major, Orchestral Suite No. 3 in D major; Dixit Dominus, Laudate Pueri Dominum. Anna Cavaliero soprano, Jess Dandy alto, Hugo Hymas tenor, Malachy Frame bass, The Geldart Ensemble – Rachel Stroud leader, Marcus Sealy organ continuo, Benedict Collins Rice conductor	Bath Abbey
2 Mar 2024	Bruckner	Requiem in D minor, Motets including Locus iste, Ave Maria Psalm 114, Two Aequali for three trombones Marcus Sealy organ & piano, Benedict Collins Rice Musical Director.	The Chapel of Our Lady of the Snows, Prior Park College, Bath, Somerset
21/22 Dec 2023	Various	Carols by Candlelight – 76th Season	Pump Room, Bath
4 Nov 2023	Parry, Ireland, Fauré	Songs of Farewell, Greater Love, Requiem: Frederick Long bass, Harry Hampson-Gilbert treble, Sebastien H. McHugh treble, Marcus Sealy organ & piano, Benedict Collins Rice Musical Director.	Bath Abbey
8 Jul 2023	Mendelssohn	Elijah: Matthew Brook Elijah, Laura Lolita Perešivana soprano, Lotte Betts-Dean mezzo-soprano, James Way Tenor, Marcus Sealy organ continuo, Southern Sinfonia – Simon Chalk artistic director, Benedict Collins Rice Musical Director.	Bath Abbey
01 Apr 2023	Hildegard of Bingen, Maurice Duruflé, Frank Martin, Eric Whitacre	O viridissima virga, Quatre Motets, Mass for Double Choir, Sainte-Chapelle, Alleluia.	St Mary the Virgin's Church, Bathwick
January 2023	Benedict Collins Rice appointed as director of music		
21/22/23 Dec 2022	Various	Carols by Candlelight – 75th Season: Jointly conducted by Nigel Perrin and Benedict Collins Rice on transfer of Musical Directorship. Accompanist Marcus Sealy. Guest Soloist Katie Bunney, Saxophone, a Headley Trust Scholar at the Royal College of Music. Programme included second performance of The Bach Choir annual Sir David Willcocks Carol Competition joint winner Matt Finch, With Wondering Awe, and Mykola Leontovych arr Benedict Collins Rice Carol of the Bells.	Pump Room, Bath
	75th Anniversary Concert – Nigel Perrin's last concert as director of music		
5 Nov 2022	J.S. Bach	Mass in B minor. Baroque Performance with Music for Awhile – Leader Margaret Faultless; Mhairi Lawson soprano, David Allsopp counter-tenor, Hugo Hymas tenor, Frederick Long bass-baritone. Marcus Sealy organ continuo. Nigel Perrin conductor.	Bath Abbey
2 Jul 2022	Monteverdi	Vespers of 1610 I Fagiolini: Robert Hollingworth continuo, Zoe Brookshaw and Rebecca Lea soprano, Hugo Hymas and Christopher Fitzgerald Lombard tenor, Sam Gilliatt and Greg Skidmore baritone; English Cornett and Sackbut Ensemble: Conor Hastings and Helen Roberts Cornetto, Emily White, Tom Lees, Adrian France Sackbut; Birmingham Musical and Amicable Society: Miki Takahashi, Christi Park, Wendi Kelly, Kate Fawcett, En-Ming Lin. Musical Director Nigel Perrin.	Bath Abbey
26 Mar 2022	Rossini	Petite messe solennelle. Soprano Johanna Harrison-Oram, Mezzo-soprano Cassandra Dalby, Tenor Chris Why, Baritone Samuel Harrison-Oram, Piano Marcus Sealy, Harmonium Mark Wood.	St Mary & St Nicholas, Wilton
2022	The choir's 75th anniversary year		
16/17 Dec 2021	Various	Carols by Candlelight – 74th Season	Pump Room, Bath,
30 Oct 2021	Brahms	A German Requiem (Brahms) Verity Wingate soprano. Paul Grant Baritone, Piano Marcus.	Bath Abbey
3 Jul 2021	Llibre Vermell de Montserrat, Sergei Rachmaninoff, Thomas Tallis, Cristóbal de Morales, Francisco Guerrero (composer), Dieterich Buxtehude, Gabriel Fauré, Ola Gjeilo, Gioachino Rossini	Mid Summer Vespers. O Virgo Splendens, Priidite, poklonimsia, Blagoslovi, dushe moya, Ghospoda, Bogoroditse Devo, O nata lux de lumine, If Ye Love Me, Parce mihi, Domine, Duo Seraphim, Magnificat, Cantique de Jean Racine, Evening Prayer, Agnus Dei. Encore: Vzbrannoy voyevode. Cassandra Dalby mezzo-soprano. Katie Bunney saxophone. Organ Huw Williams.	Bath Abbey
30 Apr 2021	John Rutter	The Lord bless you and keep you – Virtual Bath Bach Choir. Nigel Perrin director, Marcus Sealy piano.	Virtual Bath Bach Choir
16/18/19 Dec 2020	Various	Carols by Candlelight – 73rd Season	Bath Assembly Rooms, St Mary the Virgin's Church, Bathwick
12 Aug 2020	Marjorie Kennedy-Fraser Arrangement Simon Carrington	Eriskay Love Lilt – Virtual Bath Bach Choir featuring Chris Bruerton of The King's Singers. Christopher Bruerton baritone, Nigel Perrin counter-tenor, Marcus Sealy piano.	Virtual Bath Bach Choir
2 Jun 2020	Gabriel Fauré	Cantique de Jean Racine;Bath Bach Choir Quarantine Lockdown Recording Project. Director Nigel Perrin, Piano Marcus Sealy.	Virtual Bath Bach Choir
18/19/20 Dec 2019	David Clover, Bob Chilcott, Byrd, J.S.Bach, Robin Benton, James MacMillan, Bob Chilcott, Herbert Sumsion, Walford Davies, P.D.Q. Bach, William Llewellyn, Peter Phillips, Bob Chilcott, Roderick Williams, John Gardner, Ian Humphries, Bernard White, John Rutter, Tom Cunningham, James McKelvy (composer)|James McKelvy, Peter Gritton, Eric Whitacre, Paul Fincham	Carols by Candlelight – 73rd Season: Ukrainian Bell Carol, Hail, Star of the se most radiant, Lullaby, my sweet little baby, Ich steh an deiner Krippen heir, See the star, O Radiant Dawn, (audience) God rest you merry, gentleman, O little town of Bethlehem, O little town of Hackensack, Ding Dong! Merrily on high, o beatum et sacrosanctum diem, For him all stars have shone, Mary had a baby, Tomorrow shall be my dancing day, Coventry Carol, The Bees, Mary's boy child, (audience) Child in a manger, Merry Christmas Jazz, Deck the Halls, Three-minute Messiah, Lux Aurumque, Ring the Bells. The Year 5 Choir of St Andrew's Church School, Bath, Maria Foster; Peasedown St John Primary School Choir, Myra Barretto; St Julian's and Shoscombe Church Schools, Kerin Adam; Eliza Haskins recorder, Katie Bunney saxophone, Piano Marcus Sealy.	St Michael's Church, Bath, Pump Room, Bath,
26 Oct 2019	Anon, Geoffrey Burgon, Rachmaninov, Cristóbal de Morales, John Sheppard, Rheinberger, Andrew Motion/James Whitbourn, Samuel Barber, J.S.Bach Orlando Gibbons, Arthur Sullivan, Robert Pearsall, Ola Gjeilo	Before the ending of the day. Nunc Dimittis, Nine otpushchayeshi, Partce mihi, Domine, In Manus Tuas, Cantus Missae Mass for double choir in E flat, Op. 109, Living Voices, Abendlied, Sure On This Shining Light, Sonata in E flat, The Silver Swan, The Long Day Closes, Lay a Garland, Evening Prayer. Katie Bunney saxophone, Keyboard Marcus Sealy.	
6 Jul 2019	Haydn, Mozart	Nelson Mass; Kyrie and Benedictus. Exsultate Jubilate; Carolyn Sampson. Requiem; Carolyn Sampson soprano, Alison Kettlewell mezzo-soprano, Nathan Vale tenor, Stephen Connolly bass. Southern Sinfonia, Simon Chalk leader. Continuo Marcus Sealy.	Wells Cathedral
30 Mar 2019	J.S.Bach	Motetten and Organ. Komm, Jesu, komm (BWV 299), Toccata in the Dorian mode (BWV 538), Jesu, meine Freude (BWV 538), Singet dem Herrn ein neues Lied (BWV 225), Sonatina from Cantata 106, Sinfonia from Cantata 29, Lobet den Herrn, alle Heiden (BWV 230). Organ Marcus Sealy. Cello Continuo Rhiannon Evans.	Bath Abbey
19/20/21 Dec 2018	Various	Carols by Candlelight – 72nd Season	St Michael's Church, Bath, Pump Room, Bath,
27 Oct 2018	David Fanshawe	African Sanctus. Soprano Johanna Harrison, Keyboard Peter Adcock, BackBeat Percussion Quartet.	Kingswood School Theatre
23 Jun 2018	Vivaldi, Handel	Gloria, Suite from Water Music, Dixit Dominus. Soloists Kirsty Hopkins soprano, Sophie Gallagher soprano, David Hurley counter-tenor. Music for Awhile, Margaret Faultless leader. Marcus Sealy Organ Continuo.	Bath Abbey
4 Jun 2018	Rachmaninov, Vivaldi	Liturgy of St John Chrysostom, Gloria. Marcus Sealy Organ. As part of Devizes Arts Festival 2018.	St Mary's Church, Devizes
24 Mar 2018	Rachmaninov, Christopher Wood	Liturgy of St John Chrysostom, Requiem.	Bath Abbey
13/14/15 Dec 2017	Various	Carols by Candlelight – 71st Season	Pump Room, Bath, St Michael's Church, Bath
11 Nov 2017	Paco Pena, Pärt, Pizzetti, Howard Goodall, John Tavener, Daley, Whitacre	Cordero de Dios, The Beatitudes, Messa di Requiem, Requiem: Kyrie: Close Now Thine Eyes, Song for Athene, In Remembrance, Cloudburst. Marcus Sealy Organ Continuo.	Malmesbury Abbey
1 Jul 2017	J.S.Bach, Mozart	70th Anniversary Celebration Concert. Magnificat (Bach) in D, Great Mass in C minor, K. 427. Soloists Verity Wingate soprano, Anna Sideris soprano, Stephen Harvey counter-tenor, Kieran White tenor, Julien van Mellaerts bass. Southern Sinfonia, Richard Smith leader. Marcus Sealy Organ Continuo.	Bath Abbey
25 Mar 2017	Gregorio Allegri, Gabriel Fauré, James MacMillan, Dvořák	Miserere, Cantique de Jean Racine, Cantos Sagrados, Mass in D.	Bath Abbey
2017	Jonathan Willcocks, is appointed choir Vice President		
2017	The choir's 70th anniversary year		
14/15/16 Dec 2016	Various	Carols by Candlelight – 70th Season	Pump Room, Bath
29 Oct 2016	Giovanni Antonio Rigatti, Rovetta, Monteverdi, Giovanni Legrenzi, Alessandro Grandi,	Venetian Vespers:Deus in Adjutorium; Dixit Dominus a8; Laudate pueri a4; Laetatus sum; Adoramus te, Christe; Nisi Dominus; Christe, adoramus te; Lauda Jerusalem; Ave maris stella; Magnificat a 6/7. Conductor Peter Leech.	The Chapel of Our Lady of the Snows, Prior Park College, Bath, Somerset
18 Jun 2016	J.S. Bach	Mass in B minor. Baroque Performance with Music for Awhile – Leader Margaret Faultless; Mhairi Lawson soprano, Rupert Enticknap counter-tenor, Nathan Vale tenor, Matthew Brook bass.	Bath Abbey
2016	David Hill (choral director), is appointed choir President		
19 Mar 2016	Rachmaninov	Vespers and Preludes in Harmony with Exeter Festival Chorus. All-Night Vigil (Rachmaninoff) Vespers 1919. Rachmaninov Preludes. As below with one changed soloist. Soloists Nina Alupii-Morton, Kieran White. Peter Donohoe (pianist). Conductors Nigel Perrin and Peter Adcock.	Bath Abbey
5 Mar 2016	Rachmaninov	Vespers and Preludes in Harmony with Exeter Festival Chorus. All-Night Vigil (Rachmaninoff) Vespers 1919. Rachmaninov Preludes opus 23: no 3 in D minor tempo di menuet, no 7 in C minor allege, no 10 in G flat major, no 8 in A flat major allegro vivace, no 13 in D flat major grave, no 4 in D major andante cantabile, no 10 in B minor lento, no 11 in B major allegretto, no 8 in A minor vive, no 6 in E flat major andante, no 1 in C major allegro. Soloists Nina Alupii-Morton, Peter Drury. Peter Donohoe (pianist). Conductors Nigel Perrin and Peter Adcock.	Exeter Cathedral
16/17/18 Dec 2015	Samuel Scheidt, David Willcocks, Hafliði Hallgrímsson, J S Bach, John Rutter, Reginald Jacques, Richard Rodney Bennett, Ian Pillow; Mary George, Bernard Wight, Jonathan Willcocks, John Kirkpatrick, Harker, Herbert Sumsion, James McKelvy, James Pierpont, Robin Benton, Irving Berlin, Peter Garland, Andy Razaf, Scott Walker	Carols by Candlelight – 69th Season. A child is born in Bethlehem, Samuel Scheidt arr Willcocks; Sussex carol, English trad arr Willcocks; Joseph and the Angel, Haflidi Hallgrimmson; O little one sweet, J S Bach; In dulci jubilo, Old German carol arr Rutter; Audience: O come, O come, Emanuel, arr Willcocks; Audience: Good King Wenceslas, Piae Cantiones arr Reginald Jaques; Out of your sleep, Richard Rodney Bennett; The Oxen, Thomas Hardy/Ian Pillow; This Glorious Day, Mary George/Bernard Wight; In excelsis, Jonathan Willcocks; Tomorrow shall be my dancing day, English trad arr Willcocks; Away in a manger, Kirkpatrick arr Harker; I wonder as I wander, Appalachian carol arr Rutter; Lord of the dance, Shaker song arr Willcocks; Audience: Joy to the World, arr Herbert Sumsion; Audience: Birthday Carol, words & music David Willcocks; Deck the halls, arr James McKelvy; Jingle bells!, J.Pierpont arr Robin Benton; I'm dreaming of a white Christmas, Irving Berlin arr JB; In the Christmas Mood, Garland & Razaf arr Walker/Wight; 12 days of Christmas, trad arr John Rutter.	Pump Room, Bath
7 Nov 2015	James MacMillan, John Rutter, Karl Jenkins, Eric Whitacre, Vaughan Williams	Lux Aeterna, Requiem, Motets, Cantate Domino, Agnus Dei, Ave verum corpus, God shall wipe away all ters, Exsultate Jubilate; When David heard that Absalom was slain; Valiant for Truth. Soprano Verity Wingate, New Bristol Sinfonia.	Bath Abbey
16/17 Oct 2015	Karl Jenkins, Kinley Lange, Paco Peña, Tchaikovsky, Nikolay Kedrov, Sr., Gabriel Fauré, Tomás Luis de Victoria, Vaughan Williams, John Rutter, D L Bevenot	Ave verum corpus Stabat Mater, Agnus Dei (Armed Man); Cordero de Dios (from Misa Flamenca), Esto les Digo; Blazhenni yazhe izbral, Izhe kherumvimy, Dostoyno est, Sviati Bozhe; Otche Nash; Requiem; O quam gloriosum; Valiant for Truth; Requiem; Mass in RE.	Barcelona: Barcelona Cathedral, Sagrada Família, Santa Maria del Mar, Barcelona
4 Jul 2015	Tchaikovsky, Fauré Nikolay Kedrov, Sr.	Music for Vespers, Requiem; Lucy Sealy soprano, Iain Duffin baritone. Otche Nash.	Malmesbury Abbey
14 Mar 2015	J.S. Bach	St Matthew Passion. Baroque Performance with Music for Awhile – Leader Margaret Faultless; Nathan Vale Evangelist, Adrian Powter Jesus, Mhairi Lawson soprano, Rupert Enticknap alto Alexander Robin Baker bass.	Bath Abbey
17/18/19 Dec 2014	Various	Carols by Candlelight – 68th Season	Pump Room, Bath
15 Nov 2014	Marion Wood, Henry Purcell, Jonathan Willcocks, Eric Whitacre, Howard Goodall, Leonard Bernstein, Vaughan Williams	Futility, Funeral Sentences, From Darkness to Light, When David heard, Lacrymosa: Do not stand at my grave and weep, from Eternal Light : A Requiem, Chichester Psalms, O clap your hands (Vaughan Williams). Supported by Wells Cathedral School Brass Percussion Ensemble, Kate Pearson – Harp and Marcus Sealy Organ, Daniel Robson and Lydia Ward.	Bath Abbey
5 Jul 2014	A Night at The Opera – Verdi, Bizet, Puccini, Tchaikovsky, Rossini, Mozart, Weber, Strauss, Andrew Lloyd Webber, Verdi	Anvil Chorus (Il Trovatore 1853); Gerusalem (I Lombardi 1843); Brindisi (La Traviata1853); Toreador (Carmen 1874); O mio babbino caro Gianni Schicchi 1918 – Verity Wingate; Au fond du temple saint, Les Pecheurs de Perles 1863 – Kieran White & Robert Clark; Chorus of peasant girls (Eugene Onegin 1878); Waltz scene (Eugene Onegin 1878); Villagers' Chorus (Guillaume Tell 1829); La ci darem la mano – (Don Giovanni 1787) (Verity Wingate & Robert Clark); Arie des Ferrando (Cosi fan tutte 1790) – Kieran White; Huntsman's chorus (Der Freischütz 1821); Victoria, Victoria! (Der Freischütz 1821); Lieben, Hassen, Hoffen, Zagen (Ariadne auf Naxos 1916) – Robert Clark; Medley from The Phantom of the Opera 1986; Chorus of the Hebrew Slaves (Nabucco 1841).	Roper Theatre, Hayesfield Girls' School, Bath
22 Mar 2014	Handel	Messiah (Handel). Baroque Performance with Music for Awhile – Leader Margaret Faultless. Nathan Vale Evangelist.	Bath Abbey
18/20 Dec 2013	Various	Carols by Candlelight – 67th Season	Pump Room, Bath
16 Nov 2013	J.S. Bach, Bruckner, Britten	Jesu, meine Freude; Mass in E minor; Messa Brevis. Southern Sinfonia Wind Ensemble.	Bath Abbey
27 Oct 2013	Bruckner, Knut Nystedt, Mozart, George Dyson	Mass. Entrée de l'Office – Locus iste. Offertoire – Laudate Dominum. Communion – Ave verum corpus. Sortie de la Messe Confortare.	Aix Cathedral Cathédrale Saint-Sauveur, Aix en Provence
26 Oct 2013	George Dyson, William H Harris, Samuel Sebastian Wesley, Healey Willan, J. S. Bach, Gabriel Fauré, Wolfgang Mozart, J. S. Bach, Benjamin Britten, John Ireland, Ralph Vaughan Williams, Anton Bruckner	Four Anthems sung at the Coronation of Elizabeth II – 1953: Confortare – Be strong and of a good courage, Let my prayer come up into thy presence, Thou wilt keep him in perfect peace, O Lord, our Governour. Jesu, meine Freude: Jesu, meine Freude, Es ist nun nichts, Unter deinem Schirmen, Trotz dem alten Drachen, Ihr aber seid nicht fleischlich, Weicht, ihr trauergeister. Entente Cordiale – Sung with Aix Chorale Darius Milhaud Choir Conductor – Patrick Rinaldi: Cantique de Jean Racine, Ave verum corpus, Jesus bleibet meine Freude. Organ Interlude Marcus Sealy Cavatina Toccata in D minor. John Ireland, Gaston Bélier. Choral Dances from Gloriana (less nos 4 and 5). A Garland for the Queen: The Hills, Silence and Music. Mass in E minor: Gloria.	Aix Cathedral Cathédrale Saint-Sauveur, Aix en Provence
22 Jun 2013	A Garland for The Queen – Various	The Triumphs of Oriana 1601: John Bennett: All creatures now are merry-minded; Robert Jones: Fair Orianna seeking to wink at folly; Thomas Weelkes: As Vesta was from Latmos hill descending; Thomas Morley: Hard by a crystal fountain. Music from the Coronation of Elizabeth II, 2 June 1953: Herbert Howells: Behold O God Our Defender; William Harris: Let my prayer come up into Thy presence; SS Wesley: Thou wilt keep him in perfect peace; George Dyson: Confortare: Be strong and of good courage; Healy Willan: O Lord Our Governor in Benjamin Britten's centenary year: Choral Dances from Gloriana Op 53; The Ballad of Little Musgrave and Lady Barnard; Old Joe has gone fishing from Peter Grimes Op 33; Selections from Friday Afternoon Op 7 A Garland for the Queen 1953: Bliss: Aubade for a Coronation Morning; Bax: What is it like to be young and fair?; Vaughan Williams: Silence and Music; Ireland: The Hills; Tippett: Dance, Clarion Air.	Roper Theatre, Hayesfield Girls' School, Bath
23 Mar 2013	James MacMillan	St John Passion – Christus Mark Stone (baritone): City of Bath Bach Choir, Exeter Festival Chorus, Wellensian Consort, Southern Sinfonia, Leader Alexander Hohenthal.	Exeter Cathedral
16 Mar 2013	James MacMillan	St John Passion – Christus Mark Stone (baritone): City of Bath Bach Choir, Exeter Festival Chorus, Wellensian Consort, Southern Sinfonia, Leader Alexander Hohenthal. In the presence of the composer James MacMillan.	Wells Cathedral
19/21 Dec 2012	Various	Carols by Candlelight – 66th Season. Soloists: Molly Sharples Harp; Joseph Pritchard Cello; Verity Wingate Soprano.	Pump Room, Bath
3 Nov 2012	J.S. Bach, Aaron Copland, Britten	Komm, Jesu, komm; In the Beginning; St Nicolas.	Bath Abbey
23 Jul 2012	Chilcott, Elgar, Eric Whitacre, Dove	Aesop's Fables; From the Bavarian Highlands, Three Flower Songs; The Passing of the Year.	Wiltshire Music Centre
17 Mar 2012	J. S. Bach	Mass in B minor. Baroque Performance with Music for Awhile – Leader Margaret Faultless. Soprano Lucy Hall, Alto William Purefoy, Tenor James Geer, Bass Stephen Varcoe.	Bath Abbey
14/16 Dec 2011	Various	Carols by Candlelight – 65th Season	Pump Room, Bath
5 Nov 2011	Howard Goodall, Whitacre, Mikołaj Górecki, Part, John Tavener, Peters	Eternal Light: A Requiem; Lux Aurumque; Totus Tuus; Beatitudes; Svyati; Toccata, Fugue et Hymne sur 'Ave Maris Stella'.	Bath Abbey
23 Oct 2011	Knut Nystedt, Bruckner, Rossini	Laudate Domninum; Locus iste, Quando Corpus.	The Venerable English College, Rome
22 Oct 2011	Nystedt, Górecki, Ellington, Mozart, Bruckner, Rossini, Eric Whitacre, Monteverdi, Tippett,	Laudate Domninum; Totus Tuus Op 60; Come Sunday (arr John Høybye); Ave Verum Corpus; Locus iste; Quando Corpus, Lux Aurumque, Cantate Donini, Five Negro Spirituals (from Child of our Time).	La Chiesa di Sant'Agnese in Agone, Rome
16 Jul 2011	Tippett, Dahl, Ellington	Five Negro Spirituals (from Child of our Time); Songs by Roald Dahl (performed by The CBBC Junior Choir with Jamie Knights, Piano, Adrienne Hale Conducting); Pacific Song (with Marcus Sealy, Piano); Sacred Concert (Andy Williamson – saxes, Pete Judge – trumpet, Robin Holloway – piano, Al Swainger – double bass, Andy Hague – drums).	Wiltshire Music Centre
19 Mar 2011	Mendelssohn	Elijah: Roderick Williams Elijah, Mary Plazas soprano, Wendy Dawn Thompson Mezzo-soprano, Justin Lavender Tenor, Sophie Edwards Youth, Marcus Sealy Organ, The Wessex Sinfonia – Leader Adrian Eales, Nigel Perrin Musical Director.	Bath Abbey
15/17 Dec 2010	Various	Carols by Candlelight – 64th Season	Pump Room, Bath
6 Nov 2010	Monteverdi, Chilcott	Hymns and Psalms; Salisbury Vespers. Performed with Bath Camerata.	Bath Abbey
3 Jul 2010	Brahms, Horovitz	Ein deutsches Requiem Op. 45; Captain Noah and His Floating Zoo (performed by The CBBC Junior Choir with support from the Senior Choir).	Malmesbury Abbey
19 Jun 2010	Brahms, Horovitz	Ein deutsches Requiem Op. 45; Captain Noah and His Floating Zoo (performed by The CBBC Junior Choir with support from the Senior Choir).	Wiltshire Music Centre
27 Mar 2010	Monteverdi; Rossini; J. S. Bach	Beatus Vir; Stabat Mater; Cantata BWV 182 Himmelskönig, sei willkommen.	Bath Abbey
	Nigel Perrin's 20th Anniversary Concert		
16/18 Dec 2009	Various	Carols by Candlelight – 63rd Season	Pump Room, Bath
7 Nov 2009	J. S. Bach, Britten, Bruckner	Lobet den Herrn; Jesu meine Freude; Rejoice in the Lamb; Tota pulchra es; Ecce sacrados; Afferentur regi; Inveni David.	Bath Abbey
24 Oct 2009	J. S. Bach, Britten, Bruckner	Lobet den Herrn; Rejoice in the Lamb; Locus iste; Ave Maria; Tota Pulchra Est.	Thomaskirche, Leipzig
4 Jul 2009	Will Todd	Mass in Blue.	Wiltshire Music Centre
28 Mar 2009	Handel; Karl Jenkins	Messiah (Handel) Part II; Stabat Mater.	Bath Abbey
17/19 Dec 2008	Various	Carols by Candlelight – 62nd Season	Pump Room, Bath
1 Nov 2008	Pehkonen, Hughes, Vivaldi	Russian Requiem. A Song for St. Cecilia. Gloria (RV589).	Bath Abbey
12 July 2008	Vaughan Williams	An Evening with Ralph Vaughan Williams and Friends. Works by Wood, Parry, Stanford, Holst, Bruch, Ravel, Finzi and Vaughan Williams to commemorate the 50th Anniversary of Vaughan Williams's death.	Wiltshire Music Centre
15 Mar 2008	Duruflé	Requiem and works by Fauré, Messiaen, Poulenc Vierne and Hakim.	Bath Abbey
21 Jan 2008	Karl Jenkins	Requiem – New York City Premier.	Carnegie Hall, New York City United States
19/20/21 Dec 2007	Various	Carols by Candlelight – 61st Season	Pump Room, Bath
3 Nov 2007	J. S. Bach, Rossini	As a part of Nigel Perrin's Gala Concert. Lobet den Herrn. Peiite Messe Solonelle.	The Forum, Bath
14 Jul 2007	Hughes, Rutter, Purcell	Song for St. Cecilia (Commission – First Performance). Birthday Madrigals. Birthday Ode for Queen Mary Come Ye Sons of Art.	Wiltshire Music Centre
2007	60th Anniversary Concert		
31 Mar 2007	Mozart, Beethoven	'Great' Mass in C Minor K427. Christus am Ölberge Op 85.	The Forum, Bath
13/14/15 Dec 2006	Various	Carols by Candlelight – 60th Season	Pump Room, Bath
28 Oct 2006	Karl Jenkins, Haydn	Requiem. Nelson Mass	Bath Abbey
8 Jul 2006	Vaughan Williams, George Shearing and others	Sonnets & Songs with a Shakespearean flavour.	Wiltshire Music Centre
1 Apr 2006	J. S. Bach	St Matthew Passion (Neil Jenkins edition).	The Forum, Bath
Dec 2005	Various	Carols by Candlelight – 59th Season	Pump Room, Bath
Nov 2005	Karl Jenkins, Rutter	An Armed Man – A Mass for Peace. Requiem.	The Forum, Bath
Jul 2005	Various	The Grand Tour a musical travelogue.	Wiltshire Music Centre
19 Mar 2005	J. S. Bach	Semi-staged St John Passion (Neil Jenkins Edition).	The Forum, Bath
14/15/16/17 Dec 2004	Various	Carols by Candlelight – 58th Season	Pump Room, Bath
14 & 30 Oct 2004	Britten	A War Requiem (with Braunschweiger Domchor, Bath Choral Society and the boys of Bristol Cathedral choir).	Brunswick Cathedral & Colston Hall, Bristol
3 Jul 2004	Ramírez, Jean Berger, Chilcott	Songs from the Southern Hemisphere. Missa Criolla. Psalmo Brasileiro. The Making of the Drum.	Tippett Centre
7 Mar 2004	J. S. Bach	Mass in B minor	Bath Abbey
16/17/18/19 Dec 2003	Various	Carols by Candlelight – 57th Season	Pump Room, Bath
1 Nov 2003	Handel, Handel, Vivaldi	Ode to St. Cecilia. Silente Venti. Gloria (RV 589) Casella ed.	The Forum, Bath
12 Jul 2003	Sullivan	West End! A programme including excerpts from Les Misérables and a performance of Trial by Jury.	Wiltshire Music Centre
22 Mar 2003	Lloyd, Rossini	Requiem Aeternam (second performance in the presence of the composer). Petite messe solennelle.	Bath Abbey
Dec 2002	Various	Carols by Candlelight – 56th Season	Pump Room, Bath
30 Nov 2002	Haydn, Britten, John Tavener	Missa Sancti Nicolai, Saint Nicholas, God is with us.	Wells Cathedral
6 Jul 2002	Carl Orff	Carmina Burana and other works.	Assembly Rooms
6 Apr 2002	Elgar	The Dream of Gerontius. Second performance on 10 Apr 02 in collaboration with the Exeter Festival Chorus.	Forum & Exeter Cathedral
Dec 2001	Various	Carols by Candlelight – 55th Season Pump Room	Pump Room, Bath
10 Nov 2001	Haydn	Paukenmesse.	Bath Abbey
7 Jul 2001	Various	In the Mood – music on the lighter side. Including Stanford: Songs of the Fleet and Flanders and Horrowitz: Captain Noah and his Floating Zoo.	Michael Tippett Centre, Bath Spa University
7 Apr 2001	J.S.Bach	St. Matthew Passion (Neil Jenkins Edition).	Bath Abbey
Dec 2000	Various	Carols by Candlelight – 54th Season	Pump Room, Bath
11 Nov 2000	Brahms	As a part of the Bath Mozartfest. Ein Deutsches Requiem Op. 45.	The Forum, Bath c. Martyn Brabbins
26 Oct 2000	Various, Brahms	Wie lieblich sind deine Wohnungen and other pieces.	St. Salvator's Cathedral, Bruges
15 Jul 2000	Various	A Night at the Opera (with the Béla Vikár Choir from Kaposvár, Hungary).	Assembly Rooms
8 Apr 2000	William Walton, Puccini	Belshazzar's Feast. Messa di Gloria. With Bath Choral Society, The Wessex Sinfonia leader Adrian Eales, Stephen Roberts baritone, Wyn Evans tenor, Nigel Perrin and Matthew Bale conductors.	The Forum, Bath
15/16/17 Dec 1999	Various	Carols by Candlelight – 53rd Season	Pump Room, Bath
6 Nov 1999	Mozart	As a part of the Bath Mozartfest. Requiem (Duncan Druce Edition).	Bath Abbey
07/09 Oct 1999	Mozart, Handel	Mass in C K317. Coronation Anthems	Reformed Templom, Kaposvár, and Pasarét Templom, Budapest
3 Jul 1999	Rutter, Elgar, Kodály	Gloria. Give Unto the Lord. Missa Brevis.	Clifton Cathedral, Bristol
27 Mar 1999	Walton, Elgar, Poulenc	Crown Imperial. The Music Makers. Gloria.	The Forum, Bath
16/17/18 Dec 1998	Various	Carols by Candlelight – 52nd Season	Pump Room, Bath
15 Nov 1998	Mozart	As a part of the Bath Mozartfest. Dominican Vespers Soprano Rosa Mannion, Mezzo-Soprano Louise Winter, Tenor Paul Agnew, Baritone Stephen Varcoe.	The Forum, Bath
4 Jul 1998	Burrell, Dvořák, Britten, Bernstein	Benedicam Dominum, Mass in D, Rejoice in the Lamb. Chichester Psalms.	Bath Abbey
4 Apr 1998	Verdi	Requiem Soprano Gail Pearson, Contralto Jame Irwin, Tenor Wynne Evans, Bass Brian Bannatyne-Scott.	The Forum, Bath
Dec 1997	Various	Carols by Candlelight – 51st Season	Pump Room, Bath
8 Nov 1997	Mozart	As a part of the Bath Mozartfest. Misericordias Dominum. Solemn Vespers Soprano Susan Gritton, Alto Susan Bickley, Tenor Toby Spence, Baritone Roderick Williams.	The Forum, Bath
26 Oct 1997	Misc, Arvo Pärt	As a part of Paris/Chartres Choir Tour. Sienna. The celebration of Mass. Organ Peter King.	Notre Dame
24 Oct 1997	Mozart, Leoš Janáček	As a part of Paris/Chartres Choir Tour. Misericordias Dominum. Janacke's Mass. Accompanist Peter King.	Chartres Cathedral
5 Jul 1997	Handel, Hubert Parry	Acis and Galatea Songs of Farewell Soprano Leslie Jane Rogers, Tenor Alastair Thompson, Bass Quentin Hayes.	Bath Assembly Rooms
26 Apr 1997	J. S. Bach	Mass in B minor	Bath Abbey c. Sir David Willcocks
24 Apr 1997	Monteverdi	Vespers of 1610	Bath Abbey
1997	The choir's 50th anniversary year		
18/19/20 Dec 1996	Various	Carols by Candlelight – 50th Season	Pump Room, Bath
9 Nov 1996	Mozart	As a part of the Bath Mozartfest. Coronation Mass Soprano Patricia Rozario, Mezzo-soprano Jean Rigby, Tenor Martin Hill, Bass Bryan Bannatyne-Scott.	The Forum, Bath
6 Jul 1996	Fanshawe	African Sanctus Soprano Luise Horrocks	The Forum, Bath
30 Mar 1996	Rossini, Mozart	Overture to "The Barber of Seville", Stabat Mater. Coronation Mass K 317. Soprano Lesley-Jane Rogers; Contralto Vanessa Williamson; Tenor Paul Badley; Bass Stephen Foulkes. Wessex Sinfonia Leader Adrian Eales.	The Forum, Bath
Dec 1995	Various	Carols by Candlelight – 49th Season	Pump Room, Bath
11 Nov 1995	Mozart	As a part of the Bath Mozartfest. Requiem, Ave Verum Corpus Soprano Moira Harris, Baritone Charles Stewart.	The Forum, Bath
Jul 1995	Berlioz	Grande Messe des Morts (with other NFMS Societies)	Imperial College, London
25 Mar 1995	Mendelssohn	Elijah Elijah Stephen Varcoe Soprano Lesley-Jane Rogers, Contralto Andrew Murgatroyd, Treble Nathaniel Comer.	The Forum, Bath
Dec 1994	Various	Carols by Candlelight – 48th Season	Pump Room, Bath
12 Nov 1994	Fauré, Pärt	Requiem. Stabat Mater (Collection of £750 taken for the Estonian Ferry Disaster).	Bath Abbey
9 Jul 1994	Various	A night at the Opera Mezzo-soprano Penelope Davies, Baritone Stephen Foulkes, Piano Marcus Sealy.	Bath Assembly Rooms
26 Mar 1994	J. S. Bach	St John Passion Evangelist Philip Salmon, Christus Charles Stewart, Soprano Helen Kucharek, Counter-tenor Slava Kagan-Paley, Bass/Pilate James Ottaway.	Bath Abbey
15/16/17 Dec 1993	Various	Carols by Candlelight – 47th Season	Pump Room, Bath
13 Nov 1993	J. S. Bach, Britten	Wachet Auf. St. Nicholas Soprano Ishbel Warnock, Tenor Neil Jenkins, Bass Michael Leigh.	Bath Abbey
3 Jul 1993	Gershwin, Unknown, Tippett	Porgy and Bess. Missa Luba. Negro Spirituals Soprano Penelope Davies, Bass Stephen Foulkes.	Bath Assembly Rooms
17 Apr 1993	Haydn	Creation	Bath Abbey
16/17/18 Dec 1992	Various	Carols by Canbdlelight – 46th Season	Pump Room, Bath
14 Nov 1992	Rossini	Petite messe solennelle Soprano Elizabeth Lane, Alto Venessa Williamson, Tenor Hugh Hetherington, Bass Quentin Hayes.	Bath Abbey
11 Jul 1992	Carl Orff, Lambert	Carmina Burana, Rio Grande Soprano Penny Davis, Tenor Stuart Dunn, Bass Stephen Foulkes.	Bath Assembly Rooms
11 Apr 1992	J. S. Bach, Antonín Tučapský	Magnificat. Stabat Mater (in presence of composer) Soprano Julie Wood, Alto Catherine Denley, Tenor Richard Frewer, Bas Brain Rayner Cook.	Bath Abbey
18/19.20 Dec 1991	Various	Carols by Candlelight – 45th Season	Pump Room, Bath
9 Nov 1991	Pergolesi, Vivaldi, Mozart	Magnificat. Gloria RV 589. Slemn Vespers Soprano Tracey Chadwell, Jennifer Perry, Counter tenor James Huw Jeffries, Tenor Stuart Dunn, Bass Stephen Foulkes.	Bath Abbey
28 Aug 1991	Schubert, Schumann, Hassler, Fauré, Purcell, Purcell	Der Tanz. Somerleid. Tanzen und Springen. Cantique de Jean Racine. Come Ye Sons of Art. Birthday Ode for Queen Mary 1694.	Braunschweiger Dom with the Apollo Ensemble
27 Aug 1991	Handel, Handel, Ireland, Handel	The Arrival of the Queen of Sheba. Zadok the Priest. Concerto Pastorale for Strings. The King Shall rejoice.	Braunschweiger Dom with the Apollo Ensemble
6 Jul 1991	Vaughan Williams, Purcell	Oxford Elegy. Come Ye Sons of Art.	Bath Assembly Rooms
13 Apr 1991	J. S. Bach, Mendelssohn	Komm Jesus, Komm. Hymn of Praise.	Bath Abbey
19/20/21 Dec 1990	Various	Carols by Candlelight – 44th Season	Pump Room c Nigel Perrin and Elizabeth Bates
10 Nov 1990	Handel	Coronation Anthems. Organ Concertos.	Bath Abbey
7 Jul 1990	Vaughan Williams, Fauré, Horovitz	Shakespeare Songs. Cantique de Jean Racine. Captain Noah.	Michael Tippett Centre
21 Apr 1990	Monteverdi	Vespers of 1610 Sopranos Gillian Fisher, Elizabeth Lane, Tenors Andrew King, John Potter, Stuart Dunn, Bass Martin Elliot, Stephen Foulkes.	Bath Abbey
March 1990	Nigel Perrin appointed as director of music		
20/21/22 Dec 1989	Various	Carols by Candlelight – 43rd Season	Pump Room c. Elizabeth Bates
4 Nov 1989	Haydn	Mass in D minor, Hob.XXII:11 (Nelsonmesse) and Te Deum in C major, Hob.XXIIIc:1 The Philharmonia Orchestra of Bristol, Leader Anthony Pooley.	Bath Abbey
8 Jul 1989	Stanford	Songs of the Fleet, The Revenge. Baritone Jeremy Watkins, Tenor Jeremy Key-Pugh. Accompanist Michelle Spencer.	Michael Tippett Centrec. c. Marcus Sealy
29 Apr 1989	Handel	Israel in Egypt. Sopranos Lorraine Rogers, Mona Julsrud, Counter-tenor Andrew Watts, Tenor Paul Agnew, Bass Ashley Thorburn, Edward Caswell. Tilford Festival Orchestra, Leader Peter Stevens.	Bath Abbey
14/15/16 Dec 1988	Various	Carols by Candlelight – 42nd Season	Pump Room, Bath c. Elizabeth Bates
12 Nov 1988	Vaughan Williams, Herbert Howells	Sea Symphony, Piano Concerto. Soprano Gillian Fisher, Bass Brian Rayner Cook. Tilford Festival Orchestra, Leader Peter Stevens.	Bath Abbey
9 Jul 1988	Elgar, Coleridge-Taylor	Bavarian Highlands. Hiawatha's Wedding Feast. Victorian Songs.	Michael Tippett Centre, Bath Spa University c. Marcus Sealy.
23 Apr 1988	Elgar, Vaughan Williams, Hubert Parry	Introduction and Allegro. Donna nobis pacem. Invocation to Music. Soprano Lorna Anderson, Tenor Charles Daniels, Bass Brian Rayner Cook. Tilford Festival Orchestra, Leader Peter Stevens.	Bath Abbey
Dec 1987	Various	Carols by Candlelight – 41st Season	Pump Room, Bath c. Elizabeth Bates
14 Nov 1987	J. S. Bach	Christmas Oratorio. Soprano Elizabeth Lane, Contralto Cherith Milburn-Fryer, Tenor Rogers Covey-Crump, Bass Martin Johnson. Tilford Festival Orchestra.	Bath Abbey
27 Jun 1987	Duruflé, Poulenc	Requiem. Litanies a la Vierge Noire. Soprano Andrea Gray, Baritone Howard Croft. Organ Marcus Sealy.	Bath Abbey (Organ only)
28 Mar 1987	J. S. Bach	Mass in A Major. Mass in G Minor. Double Violin Concerto. Soprano Caroline Ashton, Contralto Cherith Milburn-Fryer, Tenor Paul Sutton, Bass Martin Johnson. Tilford Festival Orchestra.	Bath Abbey
17/18/20 Dec 1986	Various	Carols by Candlelight – 40th Season	Pump Room, Bath c. Joyce Honor
15 Nov 1986	Beethoven, Herbert Howells	Symphony No 3 in E Flat Op 55 (Eroica). Stabat Mater. Tenor Adrian Thompson. Tilford Festival Orchestra.	Bath Abbey
28 Jun 1986	J. S. Bach, Kodály, Mozart	Prelude & Fugue in C BWV547. Missa Brevis. Solemn Vespers. Soprano Elizabeth Chard, Alto Angus Davidson, Tenor Paul Sutton, Bass Martin Johnson. Organ Marcus Sealy.	Bath Abbey
19 Apr 1986	Mozart, Darlow	Missa Brevis in C (K258), Requiem (World Premier). Soprano Gillian Fisher, Helen Kucharek, Contralto Cherith Milburn-Fryer, Tenor Ian Partridge, Bass Noel Mann. Tilford Festival Orchestra.	Bath Abbey
18/19/20 Dec 1985	Various	Carols by Candlelight – 39th Season	Pump Room, Bath
9 Nov 1985	Handel	Alexander's Feast. Tenor Adrian Thompson Bass Noel Mann. Tilford Festival Orchestra.	Bath Abbey
27 Jul 1985	Handel, Elgar	The Ways of Zion do Mourn, Coronation Ode. Soprano Susan Gorton, Alto Denis Lakey, Tenor John Cogram, Bass Martin Johnson. Organ Marcus Sealy.	Bath Abbey
16 Mar 1985	J. S. Bach	St. Matthew Passion. Evangelist Rogers Covey-Crump, Christus Simon Birchall, Soprano Gillian Fisher, Alto Katherine Denley, Tenor Andrew King, Bass Stephen Varcoe. Tilford Festival Orchestra.	Bath Abbey
19/20/21 Dec 1984	Various	Carols by Candlelight – 38th Season	Pump Room, Bath
10 Nov 1984	Elgar	The Dream of Gerontius. Mezzo-Soprano Margaret Cable, Tenor Adrian Thompson, Bass Noel Mann. Tilford Festival Orchestra, Leader Peter Stevens.	Bath Abbey
31 Jul 1984	Fauré, Honegger	Requiem. King David (Narrator: Richard Stilgoe). Soprano Elizabeth Chard, Contralto Annabel Hunt, Tenor Charles Daniels, Baritone Martin Johnson. Tilford Festival Orchestra, Leader Peter Stevens.	Bath Abbey
31 Mar 1984	Brahms, Mozart	A German Requiem. Symphony No 34 in C Minor. Soprano Helen Kucharek, Bass Brian Kay. Tilford Festival Orchestra, Leader Peter Stevens.	Bath Abbey
21/22/23 Dec 1983	Various	Carols by Candlelight – 37th Season	Pump Room, Bath
12 Nov 1983	J. S. Bach	Christmas Oratorio. Evangelist William Kendall, Soprano Gillian Fisher, Contralto Catherine Denley, Tenor Andrew King, Bass Brian Kay. Tilford Festival Orchestra, Leader Peter Stevens.	Bath Abbey
23 Jul 1983	Elgar, Britten, Schubert, Kelly	Psalm 48 Great is the Lord, Psalm 29 Give unto the Lord, Missa Brevis. Salve Regina. Exultate. Surrexit Hodie. Baritone Martin Johnson. Organ Marcus Sealy.	Bath Abbey(Organ Only)
30 Apr 1983	Mozart, Haydn, S. S. Wesley, Bairstow, Dupré, Britten	Te Deum KV 141. Motet: In Sanae et Vanae Curiae. Psalm 96:115 Ascribe unto the Lord. Blessed City, Heavenly Salem. Cortège et Litanie. Hymn to St. Cecilia.	St. Mary's Bathwick c. Marcus Sealy
12 Mar 1983	Mozart, Schubert	Requiem KV 626, Mass in E Flat Minor D950. Soprano Gillian Fisher, Contralto Cherith Milburn-Fryer, Tenors Adrian Thompson, John Kinglsey-Smith, Bass Simon Birchall. Tilford Bach Festival Orchestra, Leader Peter Stevens.	Bath Abbey
21/22/23 Dec 1982	Various	Carols by Candlelight – 36th Season	Pump Room, Bath
23 Oct 1982	J. S. Bach, Stephen Dodgson	Magnificat. Suite No 4 in D. Te Deum (World Premier). Soprano Gillian Fisher, Contralto Simon Gay, Tenor Ian Partridge, Baritone Stephen Varcoe.Tilford Bach Festival Orchestra.	Bath Abbey
19 Oct 1982	J. S. Bach	Cantata No 215 Preise dein Glucke. Suite No 3 in D. Cantata No 206 Schleicht, spielende Wellen. Soprano Gillian Fisher, Contralto Doreen Walker, Tenor Ian Partridge, Bass Bryan Rayner-Cook.Tilford Bach Festival Orchestra.	Bath Abbey
16 Oct 1982	J. S. Bach	St Matthew Passion. Evangelist Rogers Covey-Crump, Christus Stephen Varcoe, Soprano Gillian Fisher, Contralto Elizabeth Stokes, Tenor Adrian Thompson, Bass Stephen Roberts. Tilford Bach Festival Orchestra.	Bath Abbey
16–23 October 1982	As a part of the 8th Bath Bach Festival (Stephen Dodgson was composer in residence)		
20 Mar 1982	Beethoven	Missa Solemnis in D. Soprano Susan Bingemann, Contralto Elizabeth Stokes, Tenor Rogers Covey-Crump, Bass David Thomas. Bristol Sinfonia Orchestra, Leader Colin Sauer.	Bath Abbey
January 1982	Marcus Sealy joins the choir in succession to Richard Bates as accompanist, deputy director and continuo player		
15/16/17 Dec 1981	Various	Carols by Candlelight – 35th Season	Pump Room, Bath
24 Oct 1981	Berlioz, Saint-Saëns	Music for Praise and Reflection, Te Deum, Requiem. Soprano Gillian Fisher, Contralto Cherith Milburn-Fryer, Tenor Adrian Thompson, Bass Simon Birchall. Bristol Sinfonia, Leader Colin Sauer.	Bath Abbey
28 Mar 1981	Elgar	The Dream of Gerontius. Mezzo-Soprano Jean Temperley, Tenor Adrian Thompson, Bass Stephen Roberts. Bristol Sinfonia, Leader Colin Sauer.	Bath Abbey
31 Jan 1981	Bruckner, Mozart	Mass in E Minor, 2 Orchestral Pieces. Bristol Sinfonia.	Bath Abbey
15/16/17 Dec 1980	Various	Carols by Candlelight – 34th Season	Banqueting Room, Guildhall, Bath
12 Jul 1980	J. S. Bach	Mass in B minor Under Denys Darlow as the choir's director of music. Soprano Wendy Eathorne, Contralto Elizabeth Stokes, Tenor Rogers Covey-Crump, Bass Michael Rippon. Oxford Pro Musical Orchestra. Harpsichord Gerald Gifford. Organ Richard Coulson.	Bath Abbey c. Sir David Willcocks
18 Jun 1980	Tallis, William Byrd, Brahms, Sir William Henry Harris	Lamentations. Laudibus in Sanctis. Thy servant is downcast. Bring us, O Lord God.	Chapel of Our Lady of the Snows, Prior Park College c. R Bates and E Bates
17 May 1980	Fauré, Mozart, Haydn	Requiem, Symphony no 32 in G Major K 318, Harmonie-Messe. Soprano Fiona Dobie, Contralto Margaret Cable, Tenor Richard Jackson, Bass Michael Goldthorpe. c Denys Darlow.	Bath Abbey
19 Apr 1980	The choir's founder, Cuthbert Bates, died unexpectedly. His son and daughter, Richard and Elizabeth Bates, organised a memorial concert for him on 18 June, and the choir dedicated the concert on 12 July 1980 (which was to have been Cuthbert's last concert as conductor) to his memory. The conductor was the choir's president, Sir David Willcocks. Denys Darlow succeeded as musical director.		
20 Mar 1980	Beethoven	Missa Solemnis Mass in D	Bath Abbey c Denys Darlow
18/19/20 Dec 1979	Various	Carols by Candlelight – 33rd Season	Pump Room, Bath
20 Oct 1979	Bononcini, Handel, Handel, Vivaldi	Stabat Mater. Let God Arise! Dixit Dominus. Gloria RV 589. Soprano Fiona Dobie, Contralto Cherith Millburn-Fryer, Tenor Adrian Thompson, Bass Anthony Smith.	Bath Abbey
30 Jun 1979	Verdi.	Requiem. Soprano Wendy Eathorne, Contralto Anne Collins, Tenor Kenneth Bowen, Bass Michael Rippon.	Bath Abbey
29 Apr 1979	Palestrina, Byrd, Bousignac, Duruflé, Vaughan Williams	Assumpta est Maria. Christe quit Lux es et Dies. Jubilate Deo. Ubi Caritas. Mass in G minor.Soprano Janice Baldwin, Contralto Barbara Wright, Tenor Stephen Richards, Baritone Roy Cook.	Chapel of Our Lady of the Snows, Prior Park College.
19/20/21 Dec 1978	Various	Carols by Candlelight – 32nd Season	Pump Room, Bath
14 Oct 1978	Haydn, Brahms	Paukenmesse. A German Requiem. Soprano Margaret Field, Contralto Patricia Price, Tenor Richard Morton, Bass Ian Caddy. Organ Dudley Holroyd.	Bath Abbey
24 Jun 1978	J. S. Bach, W. F. Bach, J. S. Bach, J. C. Bach, C. P. E. Bach	Bach Family Concert. Gott der Herr ist Sonn und Schild, BWV 79. Overture in D Minor. Ein feste Burg ist unser Gott, BWV 80. Symphony in G Minor. Magnificat. Soprano Kathleen Livingstone, Contralto Cherish Millburn-Fryer, Tenor Neil Mackie, Bass Graham Titus.	Bath Abbey
17 Jun 1978	J. S. Bach, W. F. Bach, J. S. Bach, J. C. Bach, C. P. E. Bach	Bach Family Concert. Gott der Herr ist Sonn und Schild, BWV 79. Overture in D Minor. Ein feste Burg ist unser Gott, BWV 80. Symphony in G Minor. Magnificat.	Dorchester Abbey
20/21/22 Dec 1977	Various	Carols by Candlelight 31st Season	Pump Room, Bath
22 Oct 1977	J. S. Bach	Mass in B minor Soprano Angela Beale, Contralto Sybil Michelow, Tenor John Elwes, Bass Stephen Roberts.	Bath Abbey
20 Oct 1977	J. S. Bach	St. John Passion Evangelist Brian Burrows, Christus Nigel Wickens, Soprano Helen Greener, Contralto Shirley Minty, Tenor John Elwes, Bass Brian Rayner Cook.	Bath Abbey
18 Oct 1977	J. S. Bach	Jesu, nun sei gepreiset, BWV 41. Mass in F major. 'Dies sind die heiligen zehn Gebot' Soprano Linda Esther Gray, Contralto Margaret Cable, Tenor Ronald Murdock, Bass Malcolm Singer.	Bath Abbey
15 Oct 1977	J. S. Bach	St. Matthew Passion Evangelist Philip Langridge, Christus Bryan Rayner Cook, Soprano Felicity Lott, Contralto Barbara Robotham, Tenor Neil Jenkins, Bass Michael Rippon.	Bath Abbey
15–22 October 1977	As a part of the 7th Bath Bach Festival		
19 Mar 1977	Vaughan Williams, Charpentier, Handel, Purcell	Fantasia on a theme by Thomas Tallis. Mass for double choir. Organ concerto in F major Op 4 No 4. Coronation Anthem 'My heart is indicting'.	Bath Abbey
		The Queen's Silver Jubilee Concert	
30 January 1977	Allan Bennett, honorary accompanist and deputy conductor of the choir died. He was succeeded in post by Richard Bates.		
21/22/23 Dec 1976	Various	Carols by Candlelight – 30th Season	Pump Room, Bath
9 Oct 1976	Mozart, Bruckner	Symphony No 40 in G minor K550. Mass in F Minor Sopran Sally le Sage, Contralto Oriel Sutherland, Tenor Peter Bamber, Bass Stephen Roberts.	Bath Abbey
3 Jul 1976	J. S. Bach	Mass in B minor Sopran Hannah Francis, Contralto Cherish Millburn-Fryer, Tenor Neil Mackie, Bass Christopher Keyte.	Oxford Town Hall
20 Mar 1976	Schütz, Handel, Duruflé	Psalm 150 'Lobet den Herren'. Chandos Anthem No 6. Requiem Contralto Oriel Sutherland, Tenor Richard Frewer, Bass Antony Ransome.	Bath Abbey
		The choir gave 3 Concerts in 1976 to celebrate its 30th Anniversary	
17/18/19 Dec 1975	Various	Carols by Candlelight −29th Season	Pump Room, Bath
5 Nov 1975	Handel	Messiah (Handel)	Bath Assembly Rooms c Allan Bennett
19 Jul 1975	R. Vaughan Williams	Benedicte. Serenade to Music. A Sea Symphony Soprano Wendy Eathorne, Bass Michael Rippon.	Bath Abbey
27 Mar 1975	Sir Arthur Bliss died and was superseded as choir president by Sir David Willcocks		
18/19/20 Dec 1974	Various	Carols by Candlelight – 28th Season	Pump Room, Bath
26 Oct 1974	J. S. Bach	Mass in B minor Soprano Elizabeth Simon, Contralto Patricia Payne, Tenor Winford Evans, Bass Richard Angas.	Bath Abbey
24 Oct 1974	J. S. Bach	St. John Passion Evangelist Rogers Covey Crump, Christus Michael George, Soprano Susan Campbell, Contralto Doreen Walker, Tenor John Kingsley Smith, Bass Stephen Roberts.	Bath Abbey
22 Oct 1974	J. S. Bach	Cantata No 106. Brandenburg Concerto No 6. Cantata No 6. Magnificat in D Soprano Angela Beale, Susan Campbell, Contralto Doreen Walker, Tenor John Kingsley Smith, Bass Stephen Roberts.	Bath Abbey
19 Oct 1974	J. S. Bach	St Matthew Passion Evangelist David Johnston, Christus Brian Ryner Cook, Soprano Angela Beale, Contralto Norma Proctor, Tenor Neil Jenkins, Bass Christopher Keyte.	Bath Abbey
19–26 October 1974	As a part of the 6th Bath Bach Festival		
18 May 1974	W. A. Mozart	Symphony No 41 in C (KV551) Jupiter Symphony. Mass in C Minor (KV427) Soprano Sally Le Sage, Mezzo-soprano Caroline Friend, Tenor Winford Evans, Bass Glyn Davenport.	Bath Abbey
19/20/21 Dec 1973	Various	Carols by Candlelight – 27th Season	Pump Room, Bath
23 Jun 1973	J. S. Bach	Mass in B minor Soprano Felicity Palmer, Contralto Oriel Southerland, Tenor Philip Langridge, Bass Bryan Rayner Cook.	Bath Abbey
13/14/15 Dec 1972	Various	Carols by Candlelight – 26th Season	Pump Room, Bath
21 Oct 1972	Schütz, Gabrielli, Buxtehude, Cavalli	Der 136 Psalm. Three instrumental canzonas: Sonata 13 (1615), Canzone for 2 choirs (1597), Canzone for 3 choirs (1615). Heut triumphieret Gottes Sohn from Orgelbüchlein. Messa Concertata.	Bath Abbey
25 Mar 1972	J. S. Bach	St John Passion Evangelist Rogers Covey-Crump, Christus Michael George, Soprano Celia Jeffreys, Contralto Annabel Hunt, Tenor Neil Mackie, Bass Stephen Roberts.	Bath Abbey
15/16/17 Dec 1971	Various	Carols by Candlelight −25th Season	Pump Room, Bath
16 Oct 1971	Geminiani, J. S. Bach, Delalande, Handel	Concerto Grosso in E minor, Mass in F, De Profundis, Chandos Anthem No 11a 'Let God Arise' [Played and sung from manuscript copies by kind courtesy of David Willcocks Esq. First performance in Bath.]	Bath Abbey
2 Jun 1971	Berkeley, Stravinsky, Michael Rose, Herbert Howells, Monteverdi, A. Gabrieli, Byrd, J. S. Bach, Vaughan Williams, Michael Tippett	Missa Brevis. Ave Maria. Sing to the Lord a joyful song. Master Tallis' Testament. Ave Maris Stella from Vespers of 1610. Magnificat for 3 choirs. Vigilante. Contrapuncti 1. 12 & 18 from the Art of Fugue. O Vos Omnes. Festival Te Deum. Plebs Angelica.	Bath Abbey
15/16/17 Dec 1970	Various	Carols by Candlelight – 24th Season	Pump Room, Bath
11 Jun 1970	William Byrd, Giovanni Pierluigi da Palestrina, Claudio Monteverdi, Benjamin Britten	Music for voices and organ. Compline Hymn, Gloria in Excelsis (Mass Confitebor Tibi), Vespers 1610 Nisi Dominus. Lauda Jerusalem, Hymn to St. Cecilia.	St Stephen's Church
16/17/18 Dec 1969	Various	Carols by Candlelight – 23rd Season	Pump Room, Bath
25 Oct 1969	J. S. Bach	Mass in B minor Soprano Eileen Poulter, Contralto Margaret Cable, Tenor Ian Partridge, Bass Christopher Keyte.	Bath Abbey
21 Oct 1969	J. S. Bach	Der Himmel lacht! Die Erde jubilieret, BWV 31, Komm Jesu Komm, Ich hatte viel Bekümmernis, BWV 21.	Pump Room, Bath c. Philip Ledger
18 Oct 1969	J. S. Bach	St Matthew Passion Evangelist Ian Partridge, Christus Michael Rippon, Soprano Sheila Armstrong, Contralto Margaret Cable, Tenor Gerald English, Bass John Barlow.	Bath Abbey
18 – 25 October 1969	As a part of the 5th Bath Bach Festival		
17/18/19 Dec 1968	Various	Carols by Candlelight- 22nd Season	Pump Room, Bath
12 Oct 1968	Haydn	The Creation Soprano Angela Beale, Tenor Winford Evans, Bass Richard Angas.	Bath Abbey
5 Sep 1968	J. Brahms, J. S. Bach	Ein Deutsches Requiem. Magnificat (Bach) in D Minor BWV 243 Soprano Sheila Armstrong (singer), Alto Barbara Robotham, Tenor Robert Tear, Bass John Shirley-Quirk.	Stadthalle Braunschweig
3 Sep 1968	Various	Selection of Unaccompanied Music, Past Concert.	Goslar
21 July 1968	Various	Recital of unaccompanied Music.	Prior Park Chapel
26 Jun 1968	Tippett	A Child of Our Time Soprano Anne Pashley, Contralto Pamela Bowden, Tenor Ronald Down, Bass Clifford Grant.	Wells Cathedral c. Sir Michael Tippett
19/20/21 Dec 1967	Various	Carols by Candlelight – 21st Season	Pump Room, Bath
9 Jul 1967	William Byrd, William Mundy, E J Moeran, Orlande de Lassus, Antonio Lotti, Giovanni Gabrieli, Jean Berger	Serenade Concert, Exsurge Domine, O Lord the maker of all things, Songs of Springtime, Tui sunt coeli, Crucifixus, Jubelate deo, Brazilian Psalm, Four Folk Songs.	Prior Park Chapel
1 Jul 1967	J. S. Bach	Mass in B minor Soprano Janet Price, Contralto Margaret Cable, Tenor David Johnstone, Bass John Noble.	Bath Abbey
20/21/22 Dec 1966	Various	Carols by Candlelight – 20th Season	Pump Room, Bath
22 Oct 1966	Handel, Duruflé	Dixit Dominus. Requiem Soprano Patricia Clark, Contralto Margaret Cable, Baritone John Noble. Organ and Harpsichord Roy Jesson.	Bath Abbey
3 Jul 1966	William Byrd, William Henry Harris, Zoltán Kodály, Johannes Brahms, Thomas Tallis, Thomas Weelkes, Giovanni Pierluigi da Palestrina, Ralph Vaughan Williams	Unaccompanied Serenade Concert. Turn our Captivity, Praise our Lord, all ye Gentiles, Jesus and the Traders, Thy Servant is downcast, In Jejunio et fletu, O Lord, arise into thy resting place, Super Flumina Babylonis, Mass in G minor. Sopran Ruth Vincent-Silk, Contralto Melani Moore, Tenor Antony Corfe, Bass William Coltart.	Pump Room, Bath
21/22/23 Dec 1965	Various	Carols by Candlelight – 19th Season	Pump Room, Bath
30 Oct 1965	J. S. Bach	Mass in B minor Soprano Ann Dowdall, Contralto Jean Allister, Tenor Richard Standen, Bass Robert Masters.	Bath Abbey
28 Oct 1965	J. S. Bach	St. John Passion Evangelist Wilfred Brown, Christus John Carol Case, Soprano Eileen Poulter, Contralto Maureen Lehane, Tenor Gerald English, Bass John Lawrenson.	Bath Abbey
26 Oct 1965	J. S. Bach	Cantata No 65. Brandenburg Concerto No 2. Motet for double choir "Sing Ye to the Lord". Cantata No 50.	Bath Abbey
23 Oct 1965	J. S. Bach	St Matthew Passion Evangelist Wilfred Brown, Christus John Shirley-Quirk, Soprano April Cantelo, Contralto Janet Baker, Tenor Duncan Robertson, Bass Richard Standen.	Bath Abbey
23–30 October 1965	As a part of the 4th Bath Bach Festival		
19 Jun 1965	Haydn	Nelson Mass (1965 Bath Festival). Soprano Anne Pashley, Contralto Yvonne Minton, Tenor William McAlpine, Bass-baritone Heinz Rehfuss. Festival Orchestra. Leader Yehudi Menuhin.	Bath Abbey c István Kertész
15/16/17 Dec 1964	Various	Carols by Candlelight – 18th Season	Pump Room, Bath
22 Oct 1964	Giovanni Pierluigi da Palestrina, William Byrd, Thomas Tomkins, Maurice Greene, J S Bach, Herbert Howells, William Walton	Excerpt from the Mass Confitebor Tibi Gloria in Excelsis Deo, Compline Hymn for 5 Voices Christe qui lux es et dies, O Praise the Lord, all ye heathen, Lord, let me know mine end, Jesu, Priceless Treasure, Nunc dimittis, Coronation Te Deum.	Bath Abbey
13 Jun 1964	Mozart	Requiem Soprano Elizabeth Robson Elizabeth Howlett (Robson), Helen Watts, Tenor Ronald Dowd, Bass Trevor Anthony. Festival Orchestra Leader Robert Masters. As part of The Bath Festival 1964.	Bath Abbey
17/18/19 Dec 1963	Various	Carols by Candlelight – 17th Season	Pump Room, Bath
19 Oct 1963	J. S. Bach	St. John Passion Evangelist Wilfred Brown, Christus John Shirley-Quirk, Soprano Noelle Barker, Contralto Elizabeth Holden, Tenor David Price, Bass Graham Sorrel.	Bath Abbey
15 Jun 1963	Monteverdi, J. S. Bach	Vespers of 1610. Eileen Poulter, Anne Dowdall, sopranos; Jean Allister, contralto; Wilfred Brown, Duncan Robertson, tenors; Richard Standen, bass. Organ continuo Roy Jesson. Brich dem Hungrigen dein Brot, BWV 39 (d Yehudi Menuhin) Ann Dowdall, soprano; Jean Allister, contralto; Richard Standen, bass; Roy Jesson, Harpsichord continuo; Festival Orchestra, Leader Robert Masters.	Bath Abbey
18/19/20 Dec 1962	Various	Carols by Candlelight – 16th Season	Pump Room, Bath
3 Nov 1962	J. S. Bach	Mass in B minor Sopran Eileen Poulter, Contralto Jean Allister, Tenor David Galliver, Bass John Carol Case.	Bath Abbey
26 May 1962	J. S. Bach, Vaughan Williams	Sleepers Wake BWV 140. A Sea Symphony Soprano Elizabeth Harwood, Tenor Brian Newman, Baritone John Shirley-Quirk. Bournemouth Symphony Orchestra Leader Felix Kok.	Bath Abbey
19/20/21 Dec 1961	Various	Carols by Candlelight – 15th Season	Pump Room, Bath
21 Oct 1961	Holst, Brahms	Hymn of Jesus. A German Requiem Soprano Pauline Brockless, Baritone Donald Bell. Bournemouth Symphony Orchestra Leader Felix Kok.	Bath Abbey
9 Jun 1961	Schutz, Fauré	Motet Ehre sei dir, Christa, Requiem Soprano Flore Wend, Contralto Marguerite Paquet, Tenor Jean-Jacques Lesueur, Bariton Jose-Luis Ochoa.	Bath Abbey c. Nadia Boulanger
20/21/22 Dec 1960	Various	Carols by Candlelight – 14th Season	Pump Room, Bath
29 Oct 1960	J. S. Bach	Mass in B minor Sopran Eileen Poulter, Contralto Helen Watts, Tenor William Herbert, Bass Hervey Alan, Harpsichord Continuo Thornton Lofthouse, Organ Ernst Maynard.	Bath Abbey
27 Oct 1960	J. S. Bach	Motet 'Be not afraid', Cantata No 4. Brandenburg Concerto No. 4 in G major, BWV 1049. Magnificat (Bach) in D major, BWV 243 Soprano Pauline Brockless, Eileen Poulter, Contralto Sylvia Rowlands, Tenor Gerald English, Bass Hervey Alan.	Bath Abbey
25 Oct 1960	J. S. Bach	St John Passion Evangelist William Herbert, Christus Richard Standen, Soprano Jennifer Vyvyan, Contralto Helen Watts, Tenor William Herbert, Bass John Carol Case.	Bath Abbey
22 Oct 1960	J. S. Bach	St Matthew Passion Evangelist William Herbert, Christus John Carol Case, Soprano Elsie Morison, Contralto Janet Baker, Tenor Wilfred Brown, Bass Donald Bell.	Bath Abbey
22 – 29 October 1960	As a part of the 3rd Bath Bach Festival		
29 May 1960	J. S. Bach and others	A programme of Anthems, Madrigals and Motets given as a part of the Bath Festival (d. Yehudi Menuhin).	The Roman Baths (Bath)
15/16/17 Dec 1959	Various	Carols by Candlelight – 13th Season	Pump Room, Bath
August 1959	Sir Arthur Bliss CH, KVCO, Master of the Queen's Musick, is appointed choir president		
28 Feb 1959	J. S. Bach	St Matthew Passion William Herbert, Narrator; Richard Standen, Christus; Heather Harper, soprano; Helen McKinnon, contralto; Wilfred Brown, tenor; Gordon Clinton, bass. Dr Thornton Lofthouse, Harpsichord Continuo; Ernest Maynard, Organ. The Jacques Orchestra.	Bath Abbey
16/17/18 Dec 1958	Various	Carols by Candlelight −12th Season	Pump Room, Bath
26 August 1958		Dr. Ralph Vaughan Williams, the choir's president dies	
7 Jun 1958	J. S. Bach	Mass in B minor. The Bath Festival 1958. A section of The London Symphony Orchestra, Leader Hugh Maguire. Jennifer Vyvyan soprano, Pamela Bowden contralto, David Galliver tenor, Richard Standen bass. Continuo Dr Thornton Lofthouse, Organist Ernst Maynard.	Bath Abbey
18/19 Dec 1957	Various	Carols by Candlelight – 11th Season	Pump Room, Bath
6 Dec 1957	J. S. Bach	Christmas Oratorio Soprano Joan Fullerton, Contralto Jean Allister, Tenor David Price, Bass John Carol Case. Organ Ernst Maynard. The Paragon Orchestra Leader Frederick Lunnon.	Bath Abbey
1 Jun 57	Thomas Tallis, Vaughan Williams	Fantasia on a theme by Thomas Tallis. The Hundredth Psalm (c. R. Vaughan Williams). The Voice out of the Whirlwind. Sancta Civitas. Benedict. Jennifer Vyvyan, soprano; David Price, tenor; John Cameron, bass. Ernest Maynard, organ. The Royal Philharmonic Orchestra, Leader Steven Staryk.	Bath Abbey
1 June 1957	Ralph Vaughan Williams Festival Concert		
19/20 Dec 1956	Various	Carols by Candlelight – 10th Season	Pump Room, Bath
Autumn 1956	Tallis, Palestrina, Bousignac, Vaughan Williams	Motet in 40 parts Spem in alium. Gloria in excelsis Deo. Jubilate Deo. The Voice out of the Whirlwind.	Bath Abbey
26 May 1956	Beethoven	Mass in D Sopran Ena Mitchell, Contralto Janet Fraser, Tenor William Herbert, Bass Richard Standen.	Bath Abbey c. Allan Bennett
19 Jan 1956	Haydn	The Creation Soloists Suzanne Danco, Richard Lewis (tenor), Owen Brannigan.	Royal Festival Hall, London c. Josef Krips
19/20 Dec 1955	Various	Carols by Candlelight – 9th Season	Pump Room, Bath
7 Jul 1955	Ralph Vaughan Williams	Mass in G Minor Soprano Pauline Brockless, Contralto Celia Moran, Tenor David Price, Bass Norman Tattersall.	Bath Abbey c. Allan Bennett
14 May 1955	J. Haydn	The Creation Soloists Suzanne Danco, Richard Lewis (tenor), Owen Brannigan.	Bath Abbey c. Josef Krips
20/21 Dec 1954	Various	Carols by Candlelight – 8th Season	Pump Room, Bath c. Allan Bennett
16 Oct 1954	J. S. Bach	St Matthew Passion Narrator Eric Greene, Christus Norman Walker, Soprano Elsie Suddaby, Contralto Kathleen Joyce, Tenor David Galliver, Bass Richard Standen. Assisted by a choir of 60 from The City of Bath Boys' and Girls' Schools. London Symphony Orchestra Leader Granville Jones.	Bath Abbey
14 Oct 1954	J. S. Bach	Cantata No 80 Ein' feste Burg. Motet Sing ye to the Lord. Magnificat. Sopranos Ena Mitchell, Rachel Judd, Contralto Nancy Evans (opera singer), Tenor Richard Lewis (tenor), Bass Hervey Alan.	Bath Abbey
12 Oct 1954	J. S. Bach	St. John Passion Narrator Eric Greene, Christus Norman Walker, Soprano Jennifer Vyvyan, Contralto Kathleen Joyce, Tenor David Galliver, Bass Richard Standen. London Symphony Orchestra Leader Granville Jones.	Bath Abbey
9 Oct 1954	J. S. Bach	Mass in B minor Soprano Elsie Suddaby, Contralto Anne Wood, Tenor William Herbert, Bass Owen Brannigan.	Bath Abbey
9–16 October 1954	As a part of the 2nd Bath Bach Festival		
26 May 1954	Mozart Beethoven	Requiem Symphony no 7 in A major. Soprano Jennifer Vyvyan, Contralto Gladys Ripley, Tenor William Herbert, Bass Gordon Clinton. London Symphony Orchestra. Leader Thomas Matthews.	The Forum, Bath
21/22Dec 1953	Various	Carols by Candlelight – 7th Season	Pump Room, Bath
23 May 1953	J. S. Bach	Mass in B minor. Soprano Jennifer Vyvyan, Contralto Kathleen Joyce, Tenor Eric Green, Bass Trevor Anthony, Continuo Dr Thornton Lofthouse, Organ Ernst Maynard. London Symphony Orchestra. Leader Thomas Matthews.	Bath Abbey
17/24 May 1953	William Byrd, Guillaume Bouzignac, Giovanni Pierluigi da Palestrina, Johann Hermann Schein, Jean Berger, Herbert Howells, J S Bach	Unaccompanied Serenade Concert. Motet in five parts Jubilate Dei, From the Mass Confitebor Tibi Gloria in excess Dei, Motet for double choir A Domino fact set stud, Brazilian Psalm for full chorus of mixed voices O praise ye the Lord, Canticle for 8 voices Nunc dimities, Sing ye to the Lord.	Pump Room, Bath
17/18 Dec 1952	Various	Carols by Candlelight – 6th Season	Pump Room, Bath
24 May 1952	J. Brahms	A German Requiem. Soprano Jennifer Vyvyan, Baritone Bruce Boyce, Organ Ernest Maynard, Harpsichord continuo Michael Allard. London Symphony Orchestra. Leader George Stratton.	Bath Abbey
18/19 Dec 1951	Various	Carols by Candlelight – 5th Season	Pump Room, Bath
8 Dec 1951	J. S. Bach	Christmas Oratorio Soprano Jennifer Vyvyan, Contralto Anne Wood, Tenor Richard Lewis, Bass Richard Standen, Continuo John Churchill, Organ Ernst Maynard.	Bath Abbey
2 Jun 1951	Giovanni Pierluigi da Palestrina, William Byrd, William Mundy (composer), Thomas Tompkins, J S Bach, Johannes Brahms, Ralph Vaughan Williams	Unaccompanied Serenade Concert. Missa Papae Marcelli, Christe qui lux es et dies, O Lord the maker of all thing. O Praise The Lord All Ye Heathen, Three chorales from the Motet, Jesu Priceless Treasure, Thy Servant is Downcast, Mass in G minor. Soprano Dorothy Langmain, Contralto Kathleen Whittome, Tenor Cecil Wigley, Bass George Blackford (of the Tudor Singers).	Roman Baths (Bath)
26 May 1951	G. F. Handel	Messiah. Soprano Ena Mitchell, Contralto Nacy Thomas, Tenor William Herbert, Bass Owen Brannigan. London Symphony Orchestra. Leader George Stratton.	Bath Abbey
19/20 Dec 1950	Various	Carols by Candlelight – 4th Season	Pump Room, Bath
21 Oct 1950	J. S. Bach	Mass in B minor Soprano Isobel Baillie, Contralto Astra Desmond, Tenor Eric Greene, Bass Norman Walker. Continuo Dr. Charles Thornton Lofthouse, Organist Ernest Maynard. The London Symphony Orchestra.	Bath Abbey
19 Oct 1950	J. S. Bach	St John Passion Narrator Eric Greene tenor, Christus Henry Cummings bass, Soprano Elsie Suddaby, Contralto Kathleen Ferrier, Tenor Alfred Hepworth, Bass Wiliam Parsons. Continuo Dr. Charles Thornton Lofthouse, Organist Ernest Maynard.	Bath Abbey
17 Oct 1950	J. S. Bach	BWV 11 – Praise Our God; Jesu, Priceless Treasure; Magnificat. Soprano Isobel Baillie, Soprano Elsie Suddaby, Contralto Astra Desmond, Tenor David Lloyd, Bass Owen Brannigan. Continuo Dr. Charles Thornton Lofthouse, Organist Ernest Maynard. The London Symphony Orchestra.	Bath Abbey
14 Oct 1950	J. S. Bach	St Matthew Passion Narrator Eric Greene tenor, Christus Henry Cummings bass, Soprano Elsie Suddaby, Contralto Kathleen Ferrier, Tenor Alfred Hepworth, Bass Wiliam Parsons. Continuo Dr. Charles Thornton Lofthouse, Organist Ernest Maynard. Seats: Nave 11/6 pence. Others 6/-.	Bath Abbey
14–21 Oct 1950	As a part of the 1st Bath Bach Festival		
20/21 Dec 1949	Various	Carols by Candlelight – 3rd Season	Pump Room, Bath
27 Jun 1949	Giovanni Pierluigi da Palestrina, Jacobus de Kerle, Vaughan Williams J S Bach	Recital of Choral Music Kyrie and Sanctus from Missa Papa Macelli, Agnus Dei from Missa Regina Coeliacs, The Hundredth Psalm, Sing ye to the Lord.	Bath Abbey
21 May 1949	J. S. Bach	Mass in B minor Sopranos Isobel Baillie Elsie Suddaby, Contralto Grace Bodey, Tenor David Lloyd, Bass Norman Walker. London Symphony Orchestra. Leader George Stratton.	Bath Abbey
21 Dec 1948	Various	Carols by Candlelight – 2nd Season	Pump Room, Bath
24 Apr 1948	J. S. Bach	St Matthew Passion. Narrator Eric Green, Christus William Parsons. Soprano Mary Linde, Contralto Grace Bodey, Tenor Rene Holmes, Bass Laurance Holmes. The Boyd Neel Orchestra.	Bath Abbey
23 Dec 1947	Vaughan Williams, Martin Shaw (composer), Edmund Rubbra, Robert Lucas de Pearsall, Palestrina, Peter Warlock, Frank Bridge, Dora Brown, Gustav Holst, Armstrong Gibbs	Carols by Candlelight 1st Season. On Christmas night all Christians sing, Sussex Carol arr Vaughan Williams; This is the truth sent from above, Herefordshire Carol arr Vaughan Williams; God rest you merry, Gentleman London Carol (Traditional); I saw three ships come sailing in, English Folk Carol (Traditional); Behoulde a sely tender babe, from Chappell's "Popular Music of the Olden Time". Words by Blessed Robert Southwell (1560–1593); Bethlehem Juda, "twas there on a Morn", Scottish Melody; Sweet was the song the Virgin sang, from William Ballet's Lute Book c1600; The holly and the ivy, Traditional; Coventry Carol, from the Pageant of the Shearmen and Tailors 15th century; Good King Wenceslas, from Pia Cantiones; I sing of a maiden, Martin Shaw (composer); Patapan, Old Burgundian Carol; The Virgin's Cradle Hymn, Edmund Rubbra; King Herod and the cock, Worcestershire Carol, arr Cecil Sharp; In dulci jubilo, Robert Lucas de Pearsall German Melody; Hodie Christus natus est, Palestrina; Adam lay ybounden, Peter Warlock; Mantle of Blue, Frank Bridge; The Blue Cloak, Dora Brown; Lullay my liking, Gustav Holst; Bell Carol, Old French; Cradle Song, Armstrong Gibbs; The first Nowell, Traditional.	The Minstrels' Gallery, Pump Room, Bath.
7 Jun 1947	J. S. Bach	Mass in B minor. Soprano Isobel Baillie, Contralto Eileen Pilcher, Tenor Eric Green Bass George Pizzey. London Symphony Orchestra. Leader Lionel Bentley.	Bath Abbey
Sept 1946	Choir Formed		
