= Music in Georgian Bath =

The musical history of Bath starts just a decade before the beginning of the Georgian Era. It went parallel to the development of the provincial spa town. As Master of ceremonies, Beau Nash played a paramount role in establishing Bath as a fashionable city, a resort where informal manners were de rigueur, allowing nobility and wealthy middle-class to mingle together.

Early in the development of the “new” Bath, Nash promoted a subscription for a band of five or six musicians paid a guinea a week. They first played in gardens but soon entertained patrons in the Pump Room itself. The band grew to seven players who performed in the Pump Room in the mornings and in the Assembly Rooms for the evening balls for two guineas a week.

When the Georgian Era was drawing to a close other resorts, such as Brighton, had grown very fashionable and Bath’s pre-eminence was already declining, however as a spa it continued to attract international luminaries, and musicians to entertain them throughout and beyond the nineteenth century.

== Musical Entertainment Venues ==
The Pump Rooms: musical entertainment took place in the mornings, for instance as “breakfast concerts”.

Concerts and evening balls took place in the Assembly Rooms.

The Assembly was an 18th century form of entertainment: a mingling of people gathering and socialising through conversation, news, games, public readings, balls, concerts and other social functions.

- The Simpson's Rooms on the Terrace Walks. These were the earliest Assembly Rooms in Bath, they were destroyed by a fire during the first quarter of the nineteenth century.
- The Wiltshire's Rooms (or “New Assembly Rooms”) on the opposite side of the Terrace Walks. They were opened in 1728. (they later became the Bath Literary and Scientific Institution).
- The Upper Rooms (i.e. today’s Assembly Rooms) in Bennett Street were built in 1771 and eventually replaced the first two

== Significant Musical Figures of Georgian Bath ==
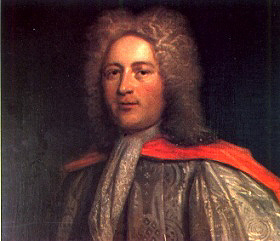
William Croft by Thomas Murray.

=== William Croft (1678-1727) ===
Croft came to Bath in 1727 but rather than musical purposes it seems he would have made the journey for his health that had recently deteriorated. Like many he would have come to take the waters in the hope of getting better. However he died on 14 August 1727 in Bath at the age of 48.
