= Chilcott =

Chilcott is a surname. Notable people with the surname include:

- Arthur Chilcott (born 1963), Australian footballer
- Bert Chilcott (1918–1992), Australian footballer
- Bob Chilcott (born 1955), British choral composer
- Cliff Chilcott (1898–1970), Canadian wrestler
- Dominick Chilcott (born 1959), British diplomat
- Izzy Wright (née Chilcott) (born 1990), Australian basketball player
- Gareth Chilcott (born 1956), English rugby player
- George M. Chilcott (1828–1891), American politician
- Jack Chilcott, Welsh rugby player
- Kate Chilcott, road cyclist from New Zealand
- Lesley Chilcott, American film producer and director
- Stephen Chilcott, BBC radio editor
- Steve Chilcott (born 1948), American baseball player
- Susan Chilcott (1963–2003), English soprano
- Ted Chilcott (1924–2003), Canadian Olympic rower
- Warden Chilcott, British Member of Parliament (1918–1929)
- Howard Chilcott (1963-present), American composer, Soccer Coach

== See also ==
- Warner Chilcott, pharmaceutical company
- Chilcot (surname)
- Chilcot Inquiry
