= Chilcot =

Chilcot is a surname. Notable people with the surname include:

- John Chilcot (born 1939), chairman of the Iraq Inquiry, referred to as the Chilcot Inquiry
- Thomas Chilcot (1707?–1766), English organist and composer

== See also ==
- Chilcott (surname)
