= Gaston Bélier =

French organist and composer

Gaston Bélier (1863 – 1938) was a French organist and composer.

== Career ==
A student of Eugène Gigout at the Conservatoire de Paris, he was titular organist at the Saint-Maclou of Pontoise Cathedral from 1892 to his death in 1938, and substitute organist at the église Saint-Ferdinand-des-Ternes in the 17th arrondissement of Paris. From 1927 he was involved in the renovation and extension of the organ of La Madeleine in the 8th arrondissement. In 1930 he participated in Victor Gonzalez's reconstruction of the organ of the Carmelite monastery of St. Joseph of Pontoise.

== Composition ==
Like his colleagues Albert Renaud and Marcel Lanquetuit, Bélier is mostly known today for his Toccata pour grand orgue in D minor published by M. Senart in Paris in 1912. He also composed an Elevation for Organ, available on IMSLP.

== Discography ==
Philippe Bardon (on the organ of Saint-Maclou): Un récital d'orgue à Pontoise (EMA 9509), with works by J. S. Bach, Nicolas de Grigny, Michel Corrette, W. A. Mozart, Felix Mendelssohn, César Franck, Gaston Bélier, Jehan Alain and Olivier Messiaen.
