= Wiltshire Music Centre =

Music venue in southern England

Coordinates: 51.3515°N 2.261°W

Wiltshire Music Centre is a 300-seat concert hall in Bradford-on-Avon, Wiltshire, England which has been described as having "the finest acoustic outside London". The Centre puts on over 150 concerts a year including critically acclaimed artists such as Claire Martin, Richard Rodney Bennett, Courtney Pine, John Williams, Imogen Cooper and the Orchestra of the Age of Enlightenment.

The centre is in the north-west of Bradford-on-Avon and is adjacent to the town's secondary school, St Laurence School. Wiltshire Music Centre Trust Ltd is an independent charity run by a small team of 10 employees, who are supported by a team of approximately 85 volunteer stewards.

== History ==
Wiltshire Music Centre opened in 1998, built with funding from one of the first National Lottery grants for art projects: £1.74 million towards overall design and build costs.

The first event to take place at the Centre was the BBC Radio 4 Any Questions? programme in January 1998. Any Questions? returned to the Centre on 1 July 2011 with Billy Bragg, Deborah Meaden, Shaun Woodward and Steve Webb as panellists.

The Princess Royal opened the Centre on 29 April 1998 and the first concert was performed by international pianist John Lill on 7 March 1998. In May 2004, the Trust was invited to a reception at Number 10 Downing Street to celebrate outstanding achievements in the arts.

== Concert programme ==
The Centre's programme and visitor levels grew year-on-year during its first decade, and in recent years the Centre has offered a programme of classical, jazz, folk and world music to more than 20,000 audience members.

The Centre promotes on average 50 professional concerts every year, as well as providing a performance venue for 30 local amateur and professional groups and on average 30 local young people's participation events. In 2011 the Centre's concerts and participation events were attended by more than 60,000 people.

== Education work ==
The Centre is home to a variety of orchestras, choirs and other music groups. The Centre was founded on a commitment to nurture musical ability or interest, regardless of age or background, and runs projects aimed at delivering strong musical experiences.

The Centre has worked with most special schools and many of the primary schools in Wiltshire, as well as a number of the county's secondary schools. In 2007 the Centre played a key role in launching South West Music School, a virtual school which provides advanced training for gifted young musicians and singers aged 8 to 18.
