= The Forum, Bath =

The Forum
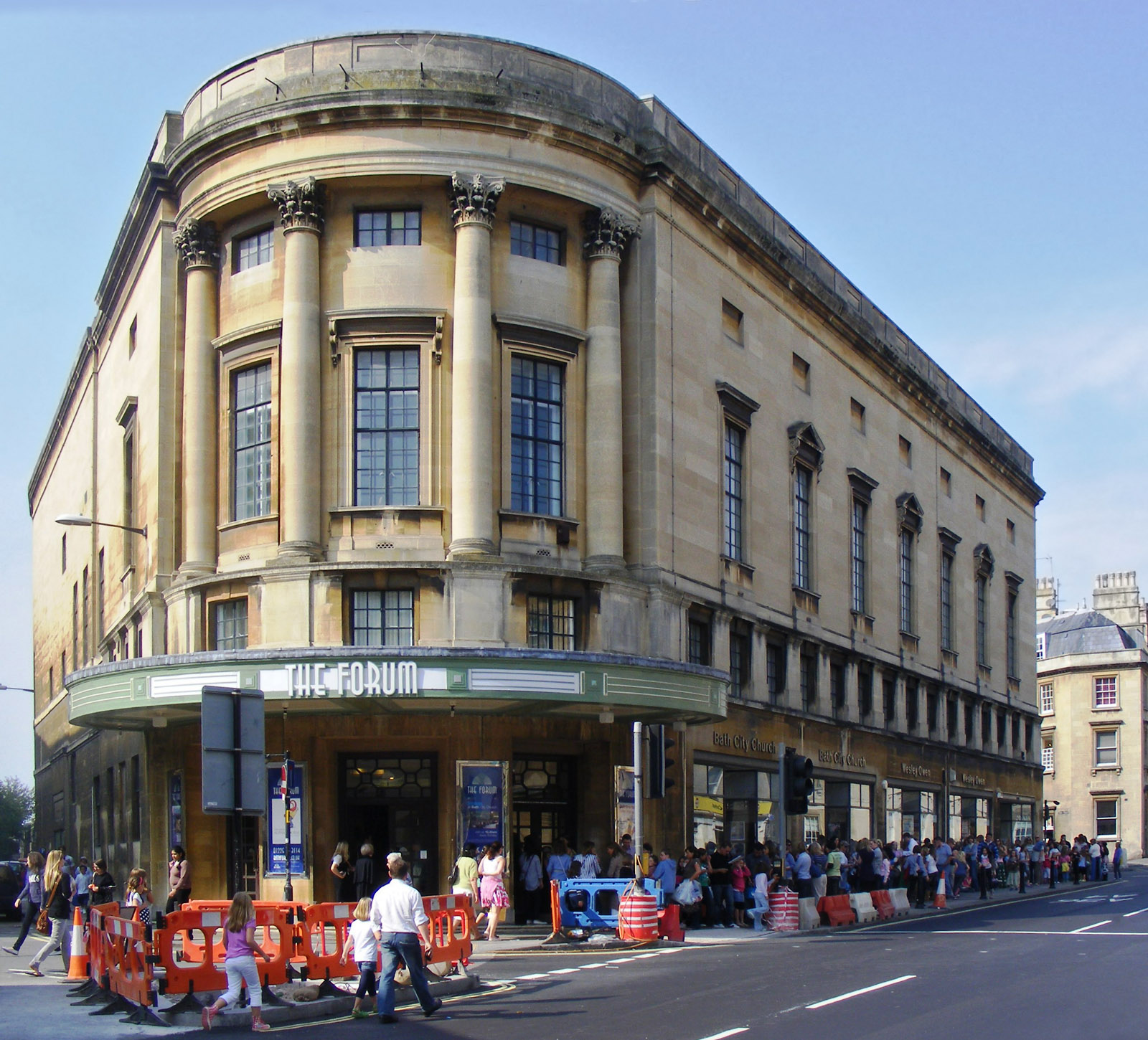

- Location within Somerset
- 51°22′43″N 2°21′38″W
- Location: Bath, Somerset, England

History
- Built: 1934

Listed Building – Grade II*
- Designated: 28 May 1986
- Reference no.: 1394832

The Forum was built as an art deco cinema in Bath, Somerset, England, in 1934, and was designated as a Grade II* listed building on 28 May 1986. The building closed as a cinema in 1969, and has subsequently been used as a dancing school, a bingo hall, a church and a large event space for concerts and stand-up comedy. Its main auditorium has 1,600 seats, making it Bath's largest event venue.

== Building ==
The Forum was built by William Henry Watkins and E Morgan Willmott, assisted by A Stuart Gray, at the cost of £80,000 (equivalent to £4,950,295 in 2025) with a steel frame covered by Bath Stone cladding in a combination of art deco and neo-classical style. Inside the walls are brick with concrete floors, with large art deco candelabra lighting. Above the auditorium is a ballroom with a sprung floor and below it on the exterior of the building are shops. The building was heated by radiators, but also by washed air, a novelty in the 1930s.

== History ==
The Forum initially sat 2,000 people and was opened on 19 May 1934 by the Marquis of Bath. It was used as a cinema until 1969, when it became a dancing school and bingo hall. The building is owned by Bath and North East Somerset Council, and from 1988 has been let on a 700-year term lease to Bath Christian Trust as the home of Life Church Bath, formerly known as Bath City Church. It currently has 1600 seats, making it Bath's largest venue for events and so is also used for concerts, performances and presentations.

The Forum has undergone a programme of extensive renovations under the supervision of Stubbs Rich Architects. In 2014, the Bath Christian Trust put together plans to convert part of The Forum's ground floor into a café which is now open.
