= Stephen Chilcott =

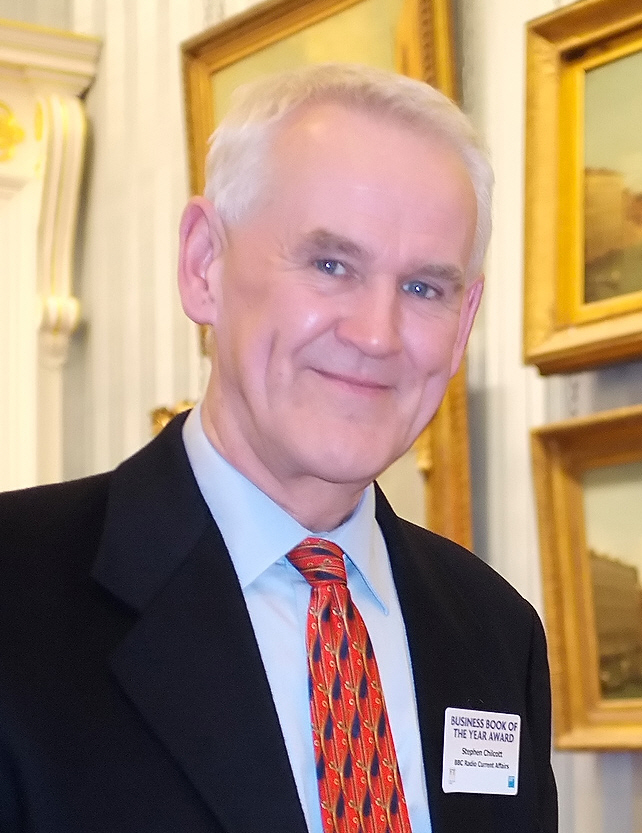
- Chilcott in 2011
- Occupations: Radio editor, journalist
- Years active: 1981–2013
- Employer: BBC
- Known for: Editor of BBC Weekly Business Programmes
- Notable work: Money Box, In Business, The Bottom Line

Stephen Chilcott was the editor of Weekly Business Programs on BBC Radio in London, based at BBC White City. He was responsible for a wide range of national radio programs on business and money including BBC World Service's Global Business, BBC Radio 4's Moneybox and Moneybox Live, Radio 4's In Business, and Radio 4's Bottom Line. He was also editorially responsible for some business focussed documentaries, including Privacy in Peril, Jay-Z - From Brooklyn to the Boardroom.

He worked 10 years on BBC Radio 4's The World at One and PM. In 1988 he was given control of Radio 4's business programmes unit.

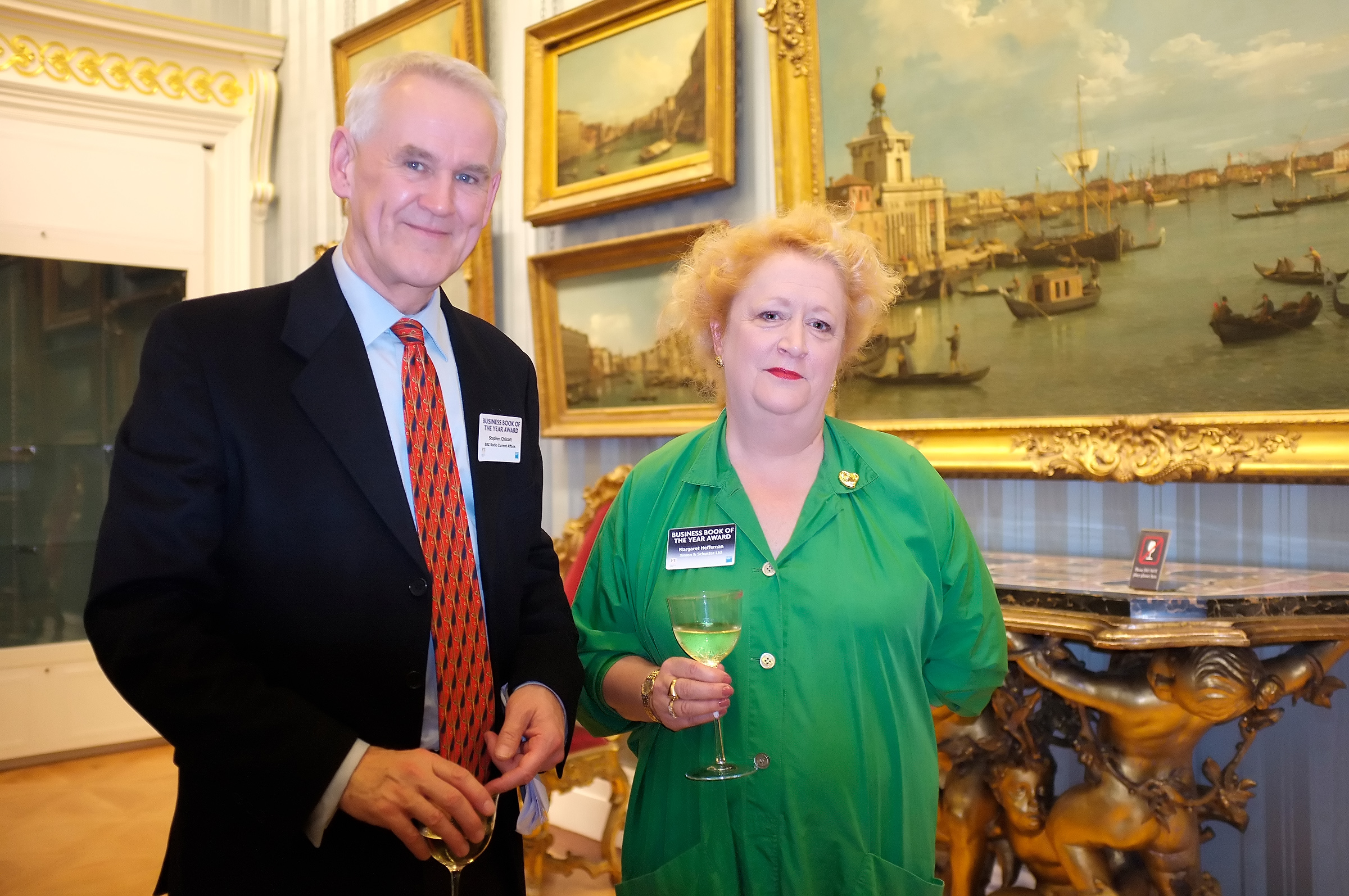
Stephen Chilcott and Margaret Heffernan at FT Goldman Sachs Business Book of the Year Award 2011
