= Jean Berger =

American musicologist, composer, conductor and music publisher

Jean Berger (French: [ʒɑ̃ bɛʁʒe]; September 27, 1909 – May 28, 2002) was a German-born American pianist, composer, and music educator. He composed extensively for choral ensemble and solo voice.

== Early years ==
Berger was born Arthur Schloßberg into a Jewish family in Hamm, Westphalia. He studied musicology at the universities of Vienna and Heidelberg, where he received his Ph.D. in 1931 with Heinrich Besseler as his advisor. He also studied composition with Louis Aubert in Paris. While working as the assistant conductor at an opera house in Mannheim, he was forcibly removed from a rehearsal by Nazi Brown Shirts.

After the Nazi Party seized power in Germany in 1933, he moved to Paris, where he took the French name Jean Berger and toured widely as a pianist and accompanist. From 1939 to 1941, he was an assistant conductor at the Municipal Theater in Rio de Janeiro and on the faculty of the Brazilian Conservatory. He also toured widely throughout South America.

In 1941, he moved to the United States and served in the U.S. Army starting in 1942. In 1943, he became a US citizen. He worked in the Office of War Information producing foreign-language broadcasts and USO shows until 1946. From 1946 to 1948, he worked as an arranger for CBS and NBC and toured as a concert accompanist.

== Academic career ==
In 1948 Berger moved into the academic world, taking a faculty position at Middlebury College in Middlebury, Vermont, which he held until 1959. From 1959 to 1961, he was on the faculty of the University of Illinois at Urbana–Champaign. From 1961 to 1966, he taught at the University of Colorado at Boulder and then the Colorado Women's College in Denver from 1968 to 1971. From 1970 on, he lectured widely throughout the world on various aspects of American music.

== Major works ==
His choral works include: "A Rose Touched by the Sun's Warm Rays", "Alleluia" from Brazilian Psalm, and "The Eyes of All Wait Upon Thee".

Other works include:

- Short Overture for Strings
- Five Canzonets
- Three Ayres
- Magnificat
- Hope for Tomorrow, set to words spoken by Martin Luther King Jr., during the third month (February 1956) of the Montgomery bus boycott.

== Personal life ==
Berger was a National Patron of Delta Omicron, an international professional music fraternity. He died in Aurora, Colorado, of a brain tumor at the age of 92.
