= Giovanni Antonio Rigatti =

Italian composer and choirmaster

Giovanni Antonio Rigatti (c. 1613 – 24 October 1648) was an Italian composer and choirmaster of the early Baroque period.

Rigatti received his musical training as a choirboy at St. Mark's Basilica in 1621, as well as in one of the conservatories of Venice. He also received training to become a priest. From September 1635 to March 1637 he was kapellmeister in the Udine Cathedral. In 1639, he worked at the Conservatory of the Ospedale dei Mendicanti in Venice. Rigatti taught also at the Ospedale dei Incurabili without the approval of his superiors, until a Commission dismissed him.

Rigatti published nine volumes of spiritual music (five soloist motets and four Psalms). He also published two books of secular music. He wrote a mass and Psalms in 1640 dedicated to Emperor Ferdinand III.
