= Cantus Missae =

Cantus Missae Mass in E-flat major
- by Josef Rheinberger
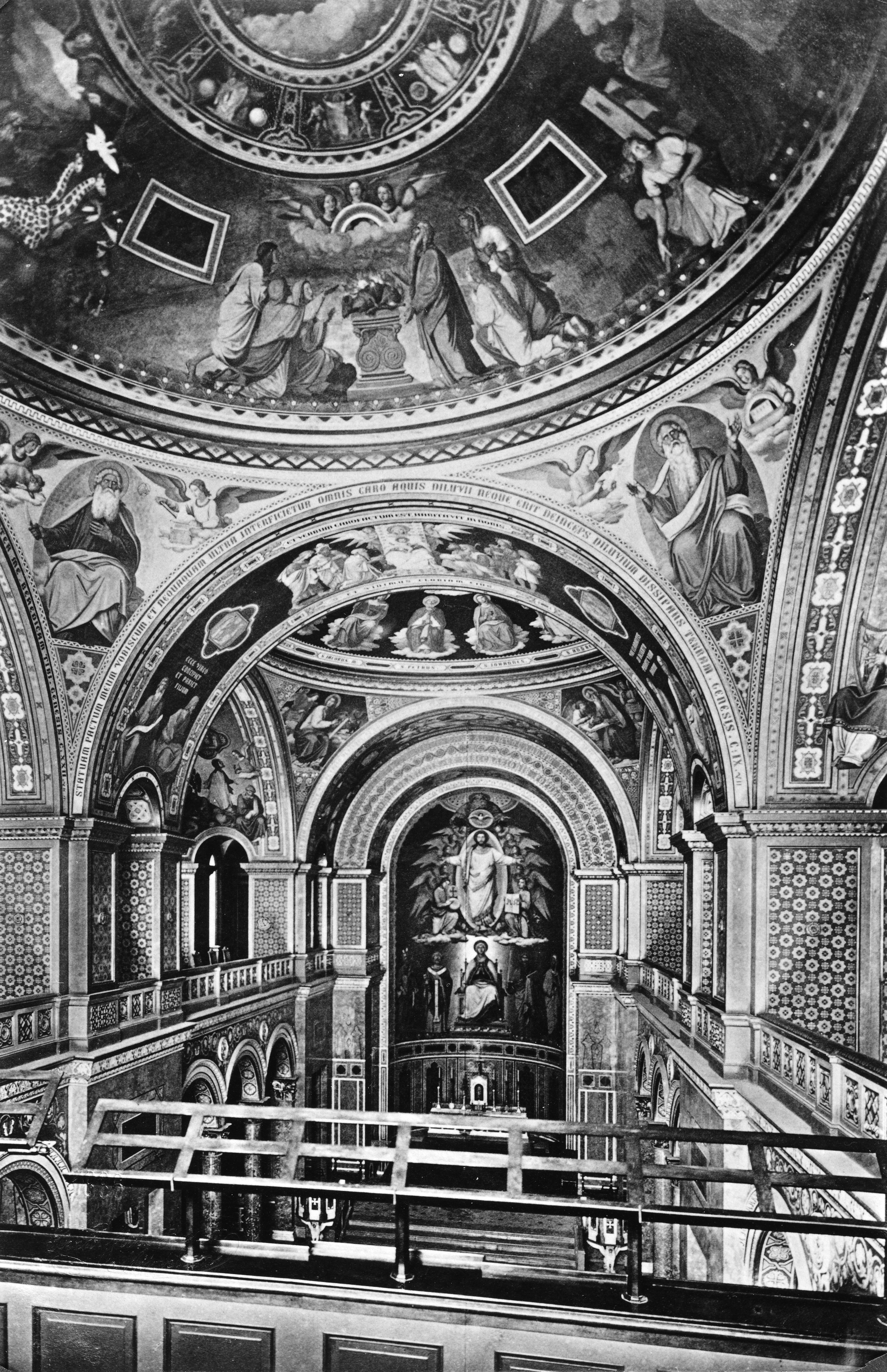
- Allerheiligen-Hofkirche in 1886
- Key: E♭ major
- Opus: 109
- Text: Mass ordinary
- Language: Latin
- Composed: 1878
- Dedication: Pope Leo XIII
- Performed: 1 January 1879: Allerheiligen-Hofkirche. Munich
- Published: 1879: Munich by Josef Aibl
- Scoring: two SATB choirs

Cantus Missae is a mass in E♭ major for double choir a cappella by Josef Rheinberger, composed in 1878. Its full title is Cantus Missae ex octo modulatione vocum concinnatus. It was first performed at the Allerheiligen-Hofkirche in Munich on 1 January 1879. Rheinberger dedicated it to Pope Leo XIII which earned him the Order of St. Gregory the Great for the work.

== History ==
Josef Rheinberger composed 14 masses, in addition to three Requiem masses and several youthful mass compositions. Most of these works were written during his tenure as Bavarian court composer in Munich, beginning in 1877, when liturgical music became his focus. He wrote the Mass in E♭ major, titled Cantus Missae ex octo modulatione vocum concinnatus within a few days in January 1878. He dedicated it to the new Pope Leo XIII on 20 February. It was first performed at the Allerheiligen-Hofkirche of the Munich Residenz on 1 January 1879, conducted by the composer.

The mass was first published by Musikverlag Josef Aibl in Munich the same year. Leo XIII awarded Rheinberger the Order of St. Gregory the Great in July 1879 for the composition. The work is Rheinberger's only mass for a double choir. The mass was published by Carus-Verlag in 1994 as part of the complete edition of the composer's works.

== Structure and music ==
Rheinberger set the parts of the mass ordinary in six movements:

1. Kyrie (Moderato)
2. Gloria (Allegro moderato)
3. Credo (Moderato)
4. Sanctus (Lento)
5. Benedictus (Andantino)
6. Agnus Dei (Lento)

Rheinberger composed the first lines of both Gloria and Credo for the choir, Gloria for eight voices and Credo for bass. The duration is given as 24 minutes.

Similarly to other vocal works by Rheinberger, the melodies are singable (cantabile), based on Renaissance polyphony. The harmonies include chromaticism and sudden dissonances. The work has been described as 19th-century Palestrina.

Rheinberger's student Joseph Renner described the mass as the culmination of Rheinberger's a cappella works, "permeated with a truly religious atmosphere, with blooming polyphony".

== Recordings ==
- Kammerchor Stuttgart, cond. Frieder Bernius), Carus-Verlag, Stuttgart 1989
- Choir of Gonville and Caius College, Cambridge, cond. Geoffrey Webber, Universal Music, 1997 / 2015
- St Albans Cathedral Choir, cond. Andrew Lucas, Lammas, 2007
- Camerata Vocale Freiburg, cond. Winfried Toll, Ars Metalli (Membran), 2012
