= Grand Pump Room =

Historic building in the Abbey Churchyard, Bath, Somerset, England

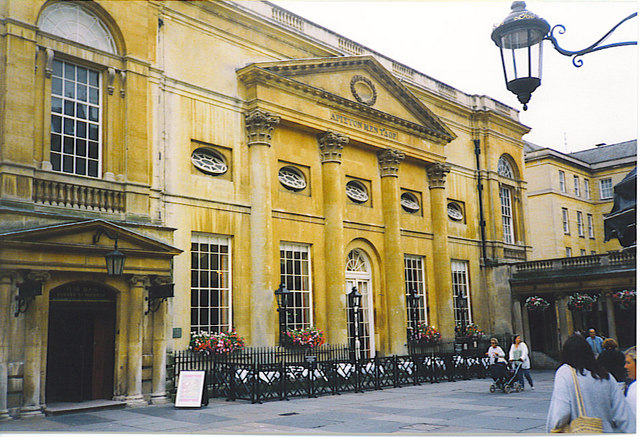

- Location within Somerset
- 51°22′52″N 2°21′34″W
- Location: Stall Street, Bath, Somerset, England

History
- Built: 1789–1799

Site notes
- Architect(s): Thomas Baldwin and John Palmer

Listed Building – Grade I
- Official name: Grand Pump Room
- Designated: 12 June 1950
- Reference no.: 1394019

Listed Building – Grade I
- Official name: North Colonnade at Grand Pump Room
- Designated: 12 June 1950
- Reference no.: 1395195

Listed Building – Grade I
- Official name: South Colonnade at Grand Pump Room
- Designated: 12 June 1950
- Reference no.: 1395196

The Grand Pump Room is a historic building in the Abbey Churchyard, Bath, Somerset, England. It is adjacent to the Roman Baths and is named because of water that is pumped into the room from the baths' hot springs. Visitors can drink the water or have other refreshments while there.

It has been designated as a Grade I listed building since 1950. Along with the Lower Assembly Rooms, it formed a complex where social activity was centred, and where visitors to the city gathered.

== History ==
The present building replaced an earlier one on the same site, designed by John Harvey at the request of Beau Nash, Bath's master of ceremonies, in 1706, before the discovery of Roman remains nearby. The main block, built of Bath stone, was begun by Thomas Baldwin, and the foundations of a Roman temple precinct were discovered during preparatory excavations. The North Colonnade of nine bays, with unfluted Ionic columns, was built by Baldwin in 1786–1790.

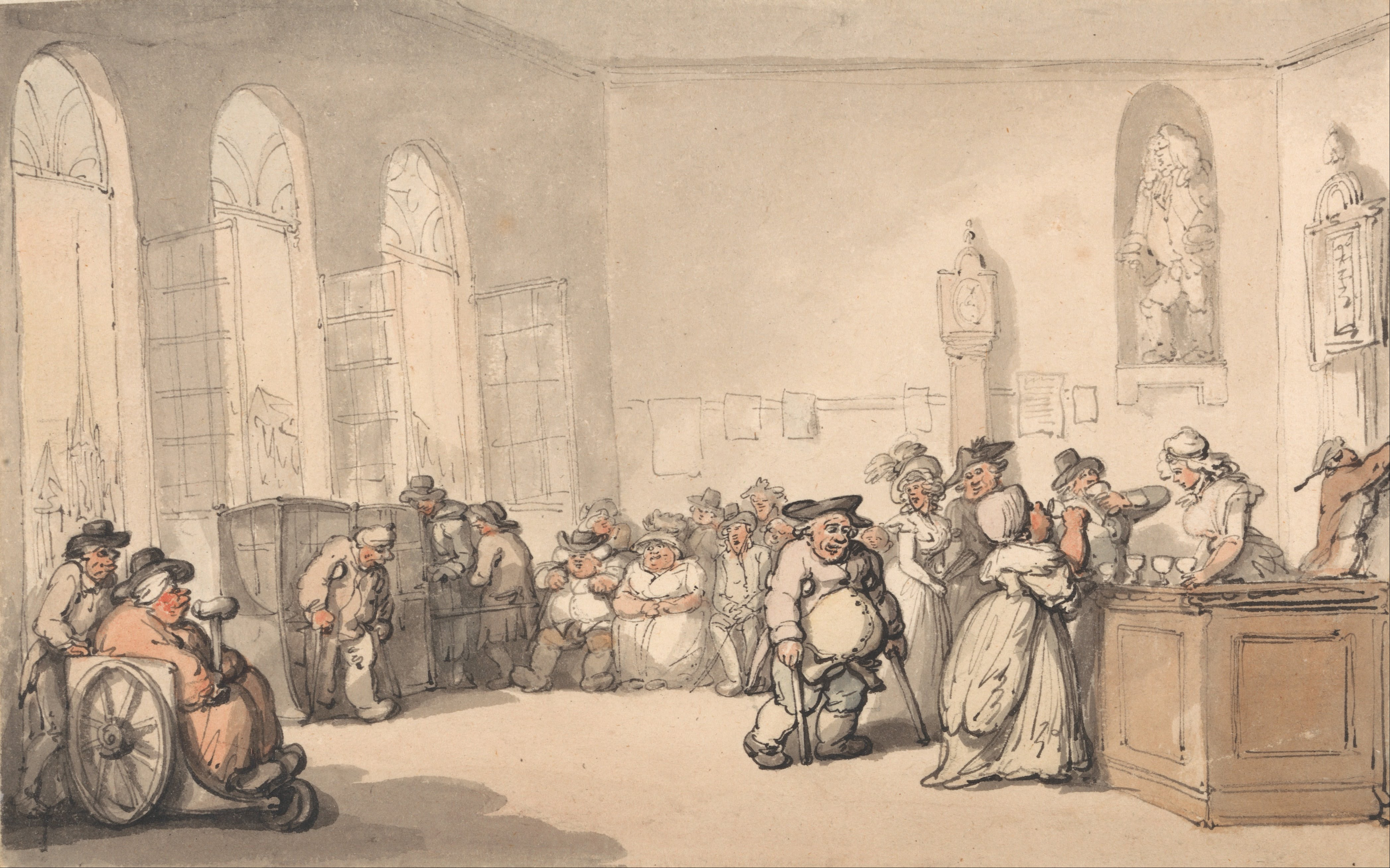
Pump Room in 1798

Baldwin was dismissed, as a result of financial mismanagement in his handling of the large sums of money allocated to the purchase of raw materials such as timber and stone. Archaeological evidence reveals that he laid the foundations for a portico at the north front of the Pump Room, but this was never completed, and Baldwin was declared bankrupt in September 1793. Another Bath-based architect and Baldwin's long-time rival, John Palmer, took his place as city architect and continued the scheme from 1793, altering Baldwin's design of the northern elevation, moving the location of the capitals that had been intended for the portico. The building was opened by the Duchess of York on 28 December 1795 and was finally finished in 1799.

The South Colonnade (completed 1789) is similar to the North Colonnade but had an upper floor added in the late 19th century. The colonnades and side wall of the Pump Room have a facade on Stall Street, with Corinthian half columns thought to have been influenced by the design of the Temple at Bassae. Willey Reveley, a contemporary expert on Greek architecture, was consulted about Palmer's revised plans. However, the aspect of the building was altered by the construction in 1897 of a concert hall designed by J M Brydon.

The interior of the Pump Room was described in Feltham’s Guide to all the Watering and Sea-Bathing Places etc. (1813) as follows:

This noble room was built in 1797 under the direction of Mr. Baldwin, architect. It is 60 feet long by 46 wide, and 31 feet high. The inside is set round with three quarter columns of the Corinthian order, crowned with an entablature, and a covering of five feet. In a recess at the West-end is the music gallery, and in another at the East an excellent time-piece, over which is a marble statue of king Nash, executed by Hoare, at the expense of the corporation. In the Centre of the South-side is a marble vase from which issue the waters, with a fire-place on each side.

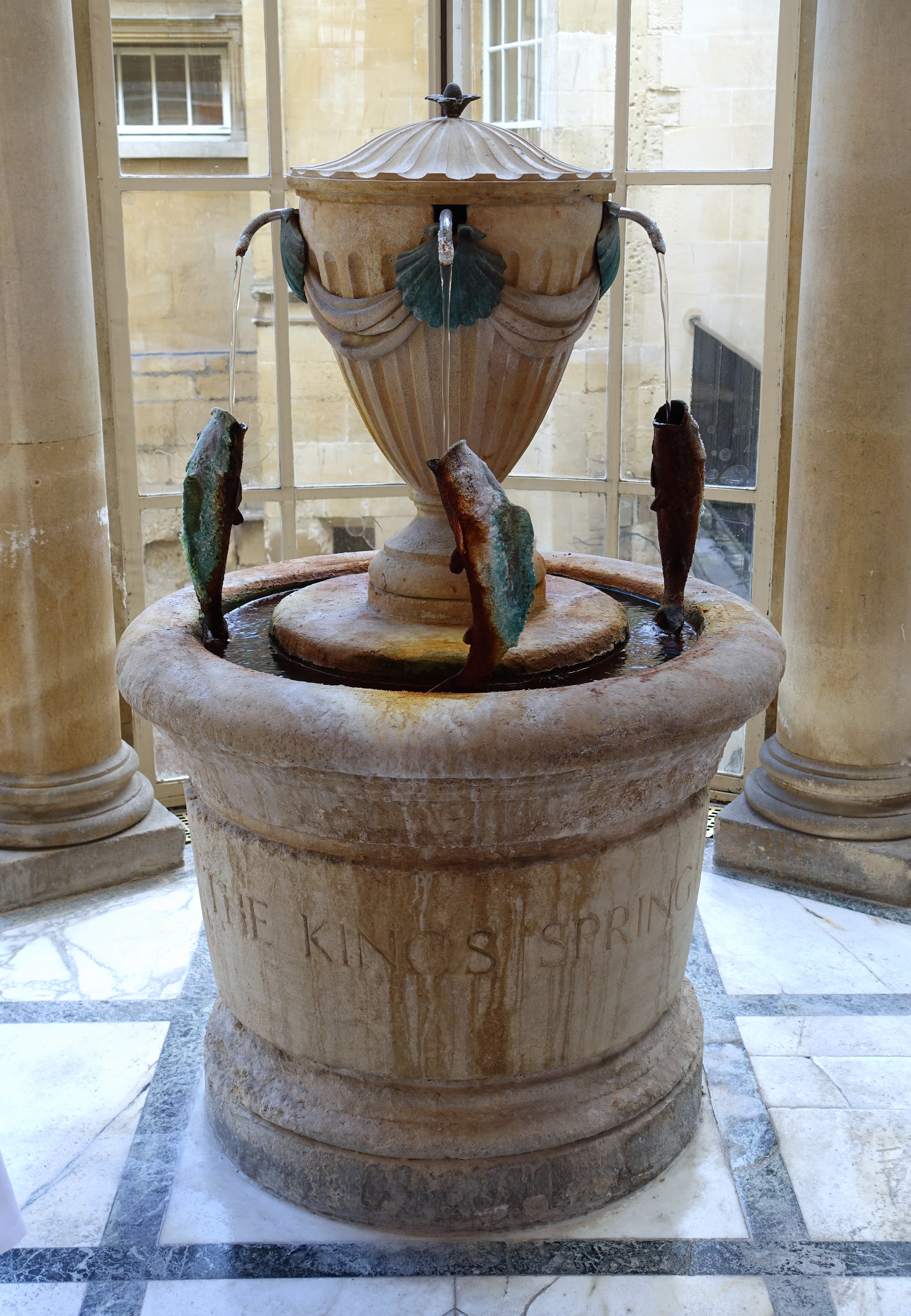
King's Spring

The marble vase from which visitors could drink the waters for medicinal purposes is also mentioned in Tunstall's 1860 guide to taking the waters, which also gives admission prices for the Pump Room and the adjoining King's and Queen's Baths. Works by local artists William Hoare (died 1792) and Thomas Gainsborough (died 1788) were also displayed there.

Original drawings by Palmer were discovered during the 1990s, which revealed how he and his predecessor Baldwin had planned the Cross Bath, which has since been restored in keeping with their intentions. The Cross Bath is now open to the public as a bathing spa, as part of the Thermae Bath Spa project.

Next to the main street entrance to the Roman Baths, visitors can drink the waters from the warm spring which is the source of the baths. The building now also houses a restaurant, where afternoon tea can be taken.

=== In music ===
Music in the restaurant is provided by the Pump Room Trio — the longest established resident ensemble in Europe — or by a pianist. There has been music in the Pump Room since the opening of the original building in 1706, when Beau Nash put together his own band to perform there. A "Pump Room Orchestra" later came into being, with Gustav Holst being one of its guest conductors during the early 20th century. Frank Tapp was notable for expanding the repertoire from 1910 and into the war, programming some sixty symphonies during his time there.

=== In literature ===
The novelist Jane Austen was familiar with the Pump Room, which is used as a setting in her novels Northanger Abbey and Persuasion. It was a meeting place for fashionable people, where "Every creature in Bath [...] was to be seen in the room at different periods of the fashionable hours". In Persuasion, Admiral Croft retires to Bath to take the waters, because of his gout. The Pump Room was used as a filming location in screen adaptations of both novels. Mr Pickwick and his friends retire to a private sitting-room in "The Pickwick Papers" by Charles Dickens, "at the White Hart Hotel, opposite the Great Pump Room, Bath, where the waiters, from their costume, might be mistaken for Westminster boys, only they destroy the illusion by behaving themselves much better".

=== In film ===
In addition to adaptations of Austen's novels, the Pump Room has been used in films such as The Music Lovers (1969), The Nelson Affair (1973) and television series such as Bonekickers. The neighbouring Abbey Churchyard was used in the filming of Other People's Children (2000) and Bertie & Elizabeth (2002).

== Gallery ==
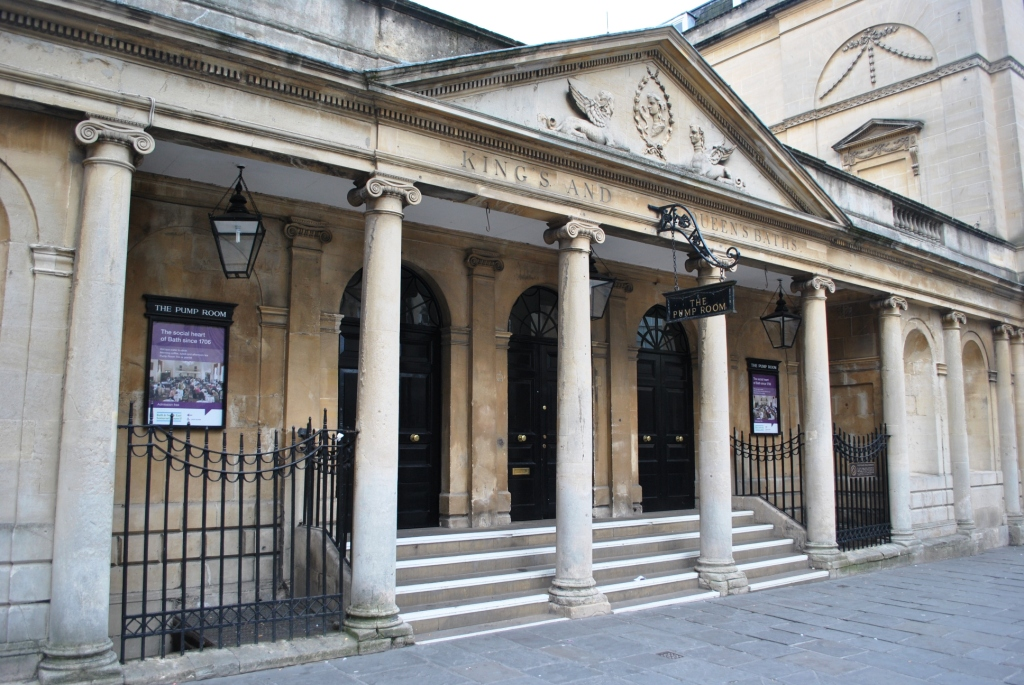
South Colonnade entrance

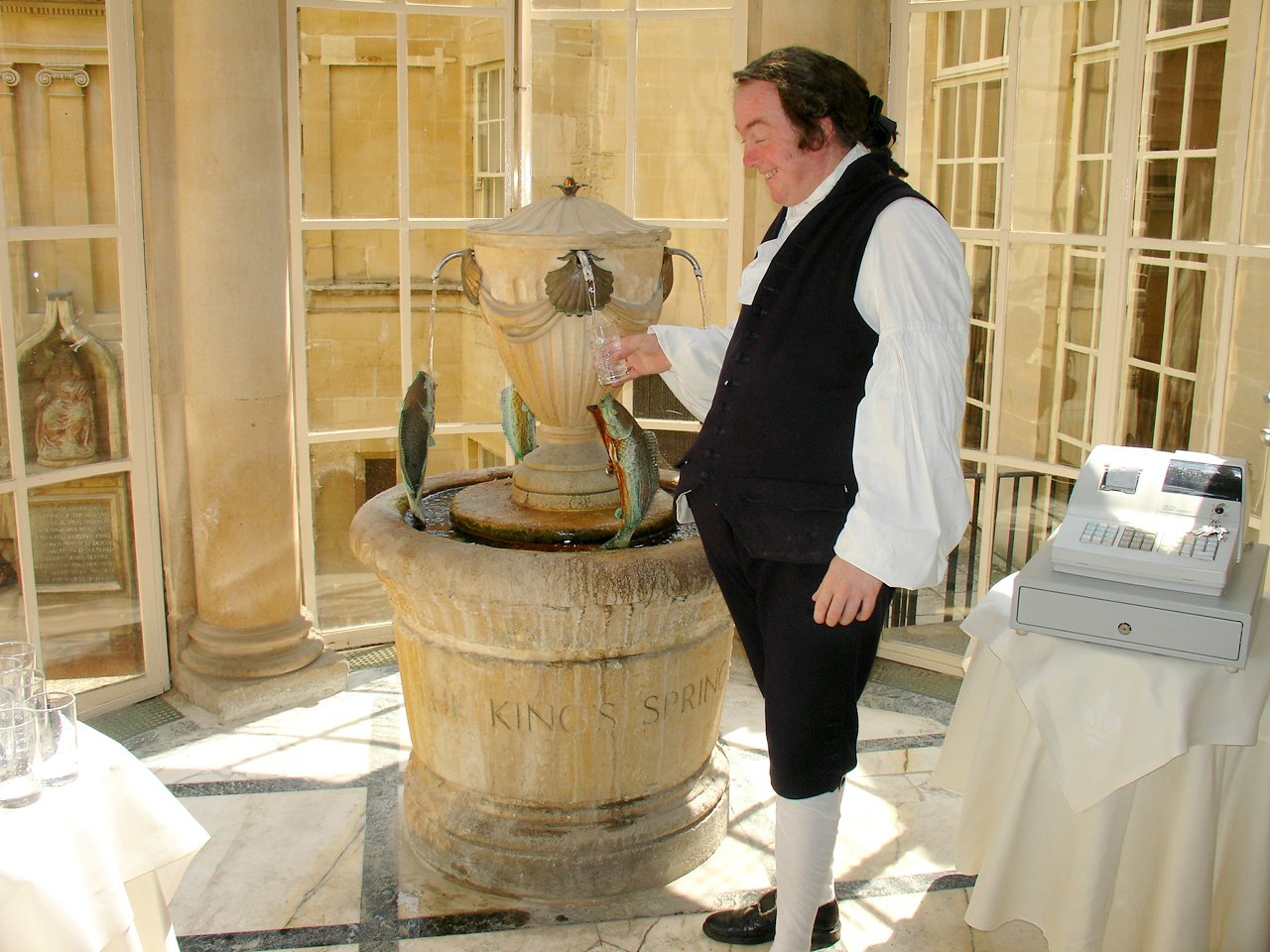
Mineral water fountain

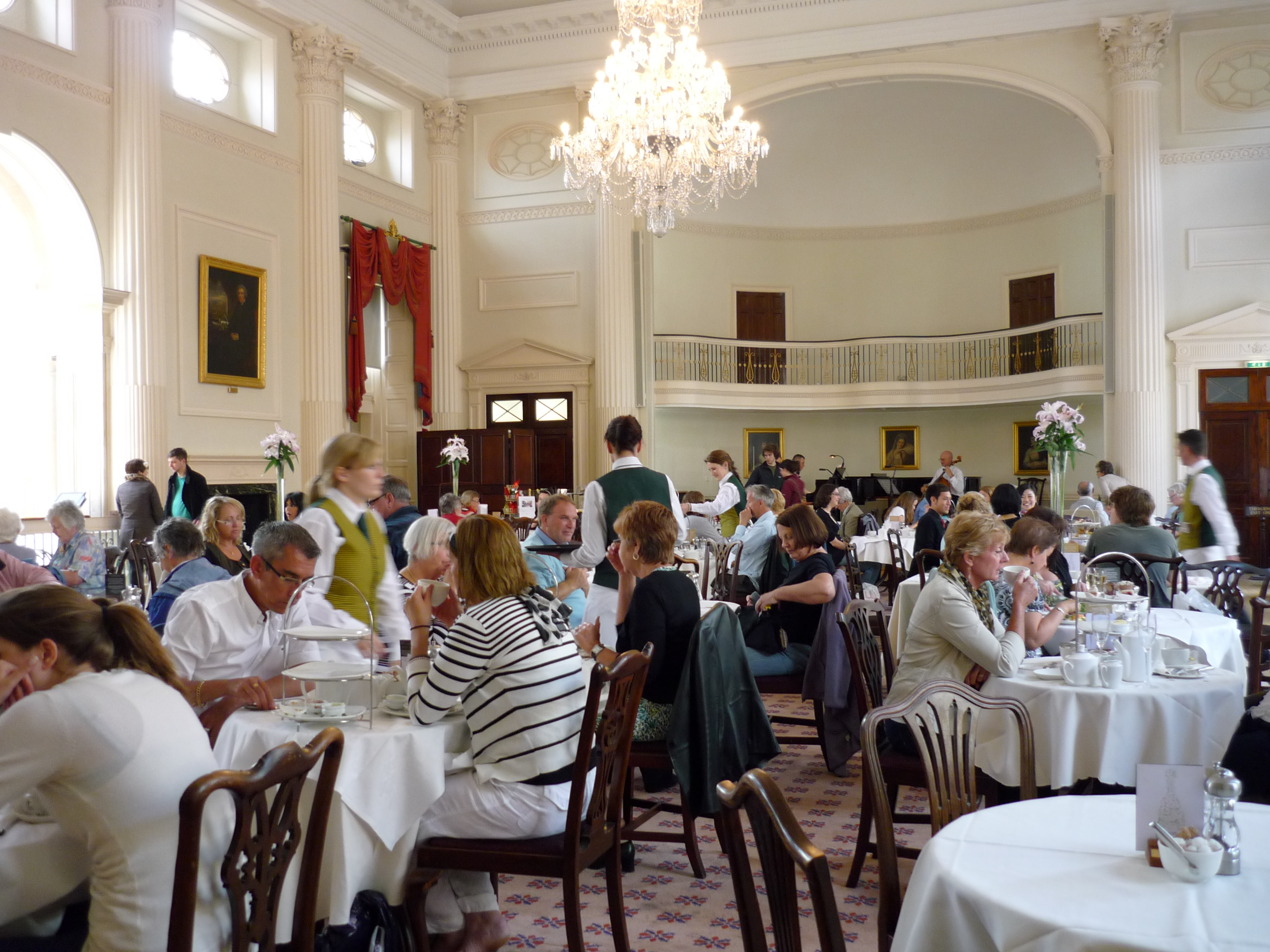
The current restaurant

== See also ==
- List of Grade I listed buildings in Bath and North East Somerset
