= Me-1 road (Spain) =

Road in the Balearic Islands, Spain

Me-1

Route information
- Maintained by Consejo Insular de Menorca
- Length: 45 km (28 mi)
- History: Formerly C-721

Major junctions
- East end: Mahón
- Me-13; Me-14; Me-15; Me-16; Me-18; Me-22; Me-24; RC-2
- West end: Ciutadella

Location
- Country: Spain
- Autonomous community: Balearic Islands
- Major cities: Alayor; Es Mercadal; Ferreries

Highway system
- Highways in Spain; Autopistas and autovías; National Roads

The Me-1 road (previously known as the C-721 road) is situated on the island of Menorca, Balearic Islands, Spain. It connects the two main cities of the island, Mahón and Ciutadella. In 2001 improvements were made to the road; the lanes were widened and the road diverted from the urban centres of Alayor and Ferreries. It has a total length of 45 kilometres.

== History ==
The origins of the road date back to the 2nd century BC, when the Roman Empire conquered the Balearic Islands, Quintus Caecilius Metellus Balearicus ordered for a Roman road to be built which united the cities of Magonis (now Mahón) and Jamma (now Ciudadella). Since then the route of the road has changed very little.

== Name ==
=== Former name ===
Before the improvements in 2001 the road was called the C-721. This name was formed using a combination of the letter C, identifying that the road is regional (Spanish: comarcal), with the following three numbers:

- Firstly: 7, indicating that the road is situated on the Balearic Islands.
- Secondly: 2, indicating that it is on the island of Menorca.
- Lastly: 1, the number that it received in the order of all the regional roads on the island.

=== Current name ===
Currently the road is designated Me-1; The prefix Me indicates that it belongs to the Menorca road network, and the 1 is the number that it has in the order of the entire road network on the island.
