= Castle of Santa Àgueda =

Castle in Ferreries, Menorca, Spain

Coordinates: 40.02762°N 4.00783°E

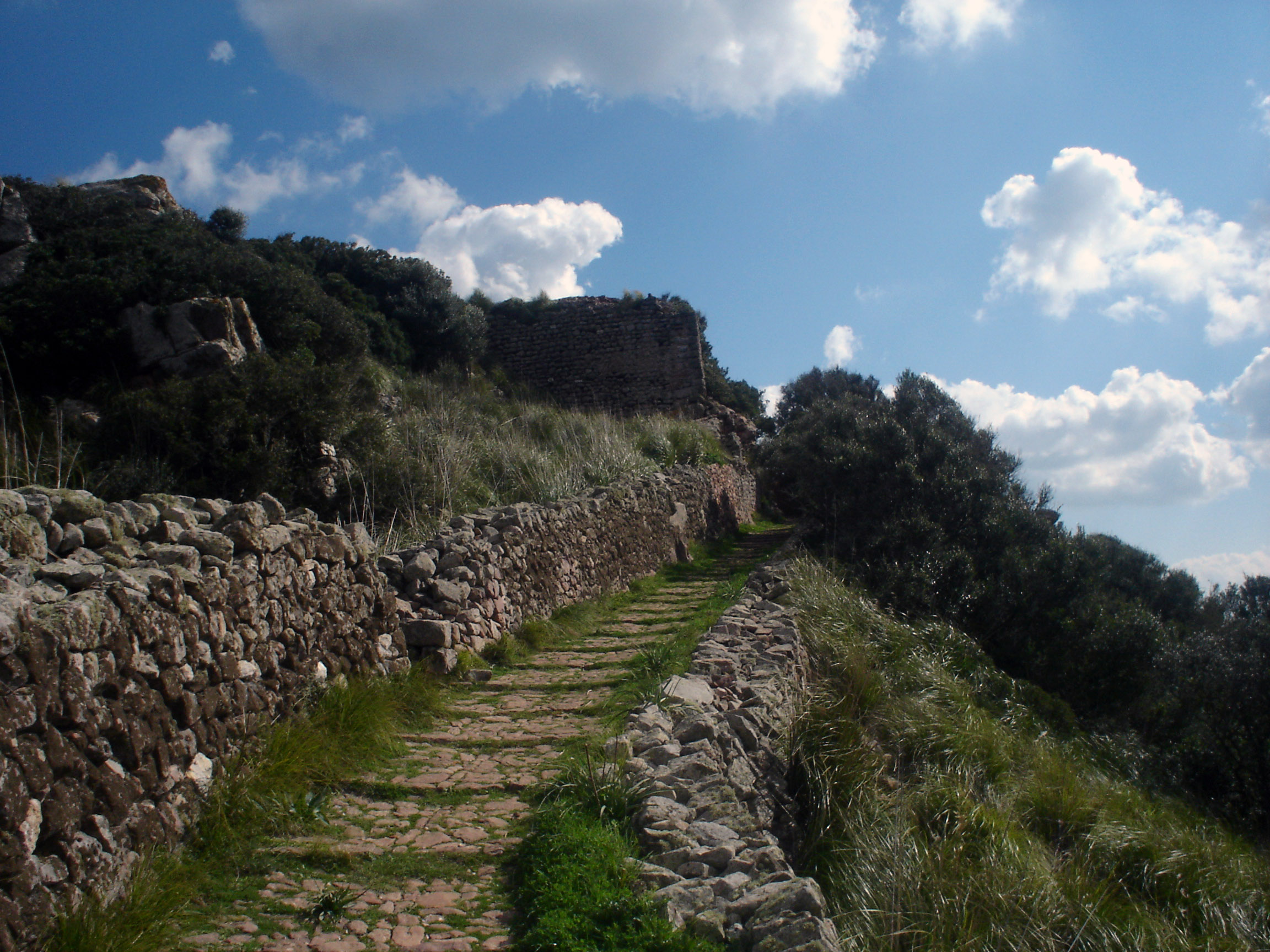
Roman road of Santa Àgueda

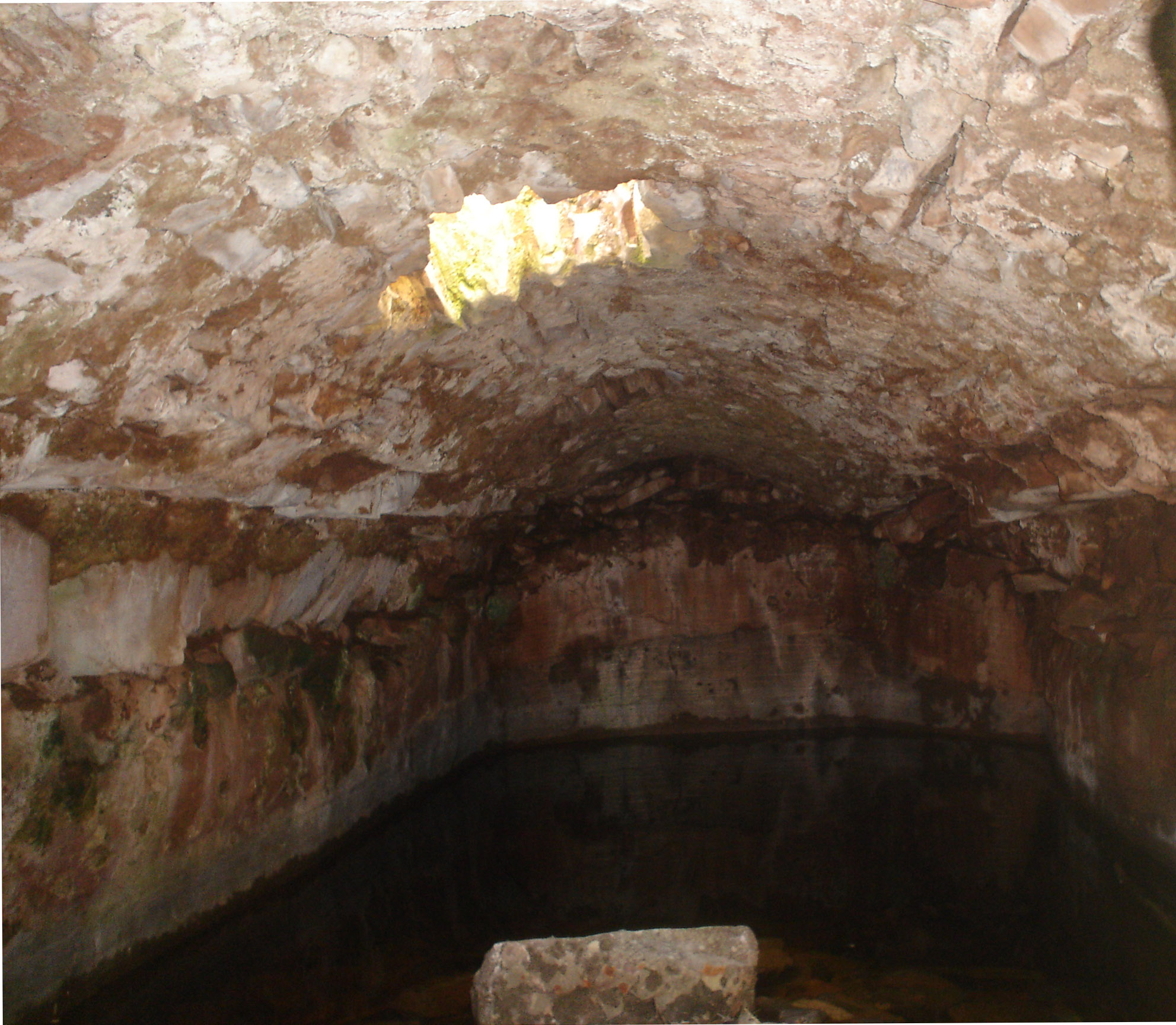
Cistern inside

The Castle of Santa Àgueda (Arabized: Sent Agaiz) (in English, "Saint Agatha's Castle") is found in the municipality of Ferreries, Menorca. It is situated over an elongated plateau, called Santa Àgueda, 264 m above sea level. It is the third highest point in the island behind Monte Toro (358 m) and S'Enclusa (275 m). The castle is accessed by an ancient Roman road. Next to the castle there was also, until recently, a chapel dedicated to Saint Agatha.

== History ==
The Castle of Santa Àgueda was built over an ancient Roman castra by the Arabs, when Manûrqa (Menorca) was part of the Caliphate of Cordoba. The exact date of its construction is not known, but it was prior to 1232. In 1287, it became the last standpoint of resistance by the Arab inhabitants when the island was invaded by King Alfonso III of Aragon. The castle was later destroyed by Alfonso's grand-nephew King Peter IV of Aragon around 1343.

The Castle of Santa Àgueda (2006) is in ruins. There is a project by the local insular government, Plan Especial de Protección de Santa Àgueda (PEP) (2004), to rehabilitate and refurbish Santa Àgueda.

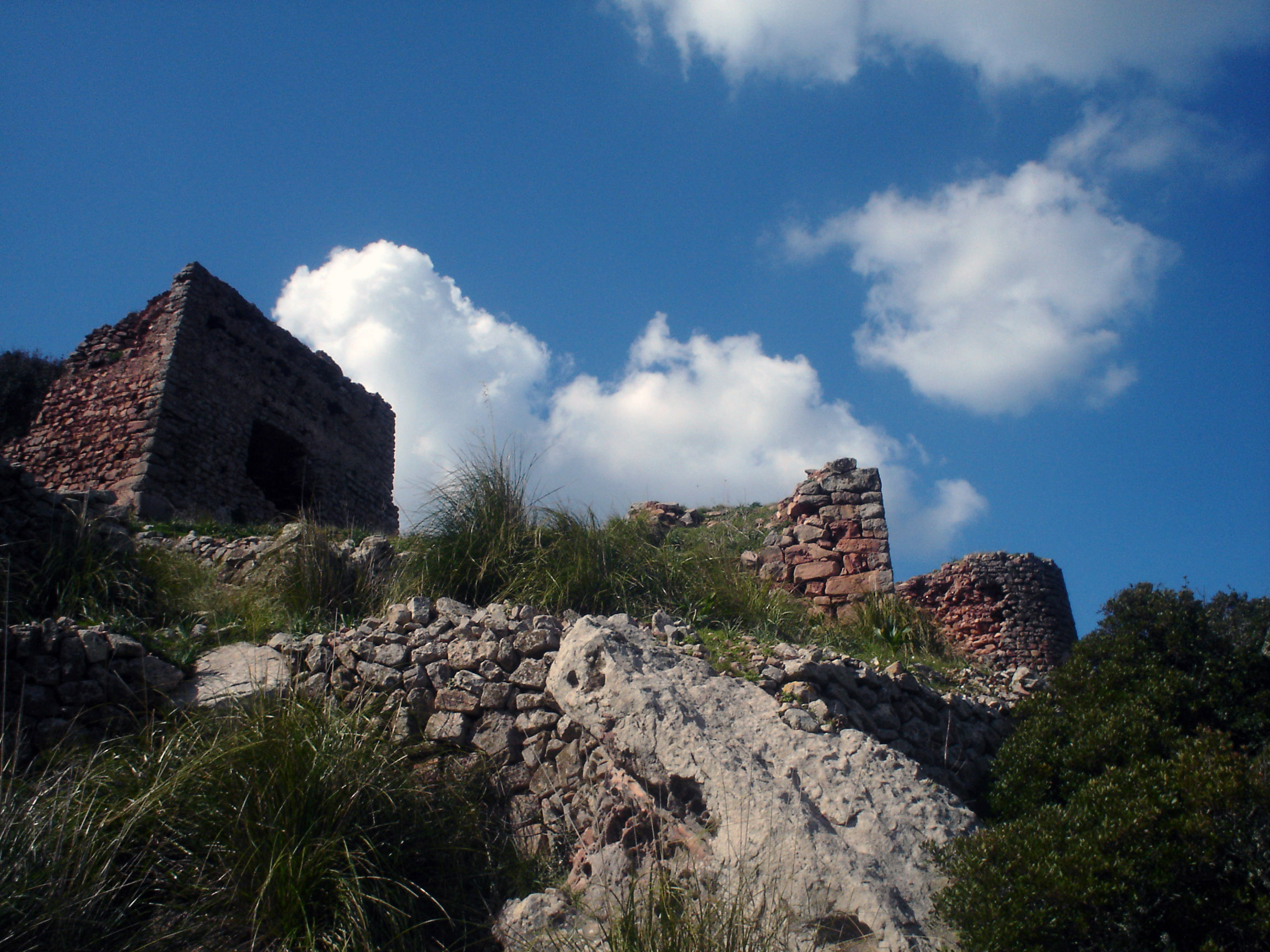
Ruins of Santa Àgueda

The Consell Insular de Menorca, Menorca's Island Council, announced on 17 January 2007 the acquisition of the castle from its private owners; this coincided with Menorca's National Day, the same day that the island was conquered by Alfonso III of Aragon.
