= List of islets of Menorca =

A list of islets of Menorca:

Municipality	Name	Area (m^{2})	Perimeter (m)	Maximum length (m)
Ciutadela	Cala Fontanelles	2.500	200	18.4
Mahón	Plana o Quarantena	10.000	500	..
Mahón	Isla del Lazareto (artificial)	293.750	2.700	..
Mahón	Isla del Rey (Menorca)	42.500	900	14.5
Mahón	de las Águilas	4.475	550	23.5
Mahón	de sa Mesquida	..	450	..
Mahón	d'en Colom	595.000	4.350	40.0
Mahón	Esculls o illots de sa Cudia (dos)	12.480	650	22.7
Mahón	Esculler del Colomar	..	180	..
Mahón	Escullets	..	500	..
Mahón	de las Águilas (dos)	2.500	250	13.3
Mahón	Grande de Addaia	75.500	1.850	22.1
Mahón	Pequeña de Addaia	50.000	1.300	7.8
Mercadal	Esculls de Cala Pregonda	18.875	900	10.2
Mercadal	Bleda pequeña	7.500	..	21.5
Mercadal	de na Ponça	..	250	..
Mercadal	Escullets d'Addaia	..	500	..
Mercadal	d'en Tosqueta	6.250	300	6.1
Mercadal	de ses Mones	6.250	300	16.7
Mercadal	Sargantana o de ses Sargantanes	25.700	700	14.5
Mercadal	Ravells	3.125	300	6.3
Mercadal	de los Porros de Fornells	1.600	100	1.4
Mercadal	Esculls de Fornells	..	300	..
Mercadal	Es Cobrombol	..	450	..
Mercadal	de los Porros o sa Nitja	82.500	1.150	18.5
Mercadal	Llosa na Macaret/Illetes des Carbó	5.000	..	3.6
Mercadal	de ses Bledes	37.500	1.320	61.5
Mercadal	Escull de Binicodrell	5.000	380	6.1
Mercadal	de na Joanassa	..	400	..
Es Migjorn Gran	Islote de Binicodrell	..	..	..
San Luis	Escull de Cala Alcalfar	..	150	..
San Luis	Islotes de Binibèquer	..	190	..
San Luis	Escull de Binissafúller	16.250	850	3.5
San Luis	Esculls d'en Marçal	3.750	250	2.5
San Luis	Isla del Aire	343.750	3.300	15.0
