= English Cemetery, Menorca =

Cemetery in the Balearic Islands of Spain

Coordinates: 39.8894°N 4.2902°E

The English Cemetery or Anglo-American Cemetery in Menorca, sometimes the Port Mahon Cemetery or the Christian Cemetery in Menorca, is a cemetery developed in the course of United States naval activity dating to the early 19th century, located in Port Mahon, Menorca, in the Balearic Islands of Spain. It is the resting place of twenty known United States Navy sailors, one Navy wife, and others, some unknown.

== History ==
As the United States moved further into international commerce and influence after the War of 1812, its navy developed a natural European base of operations at the eastern end of the transatlantic crossing in Gibraltar. Lingering feelings from the war, however, made the sharing of the port with the British difficult and operations were moved to Menorca, off the Spanish coast, in 1820. The English Cemetery at Port Mahon dated to the turn of the century; its name derived not necessarily from the nationality of those who would be buried within but from their non-Catholic religion in a Catholic country.

A medical facility and cemetery was natural in a peacetime training base abroad, and the cemetery gained mostly Americans who had died of illness or injury, and occasional sailors of other nationalities. The last recorded burial was that of Lt. Karl von Bunsen, of the German family associated with the Bunsen Burner, in 1890. Its burials were varied in record keeping and the informal creation of tombstones. The cemetery's significance in U.S. naval history became most important with the visit of the Civil War naval hero for the Union, and the US Navy's first admiral, David Farragut, whose father had been born in Ciudella, Menorca in 1775. After his visit in 1868, Menorca and its cemetery receded in importance and fell into neglect. Occasional maintenance would come mainly from sailors of any nation who happened to land on the island.

In 1965, amateur historian and American ex-pat Menorcan resident Jim Maps published an article about the cemetery in the naval history periodical American Neptune. It had been his hope that, in depicting its neglected condition, the U.S. Navy would take official responsibility for its upkeep. That did not occur, though sailors of an occasional American ship would tend to it as time allowed, and, beginning in 1977, were directed to do so through memos to visiting ships. Eventually, the English Cemetery came under the unofficial care of the Madrid Council of the Navy League of the United States. In cooperation with the Madrid Council, the Spanish government performed extensive restoration of the cemetery, including reinforcement of its walls and protection from the sea, in 2008. It is visited by the Madrid League each American Memorial Day. It contains twenty fully named Americans, some who are partially identified and a small, indeterminate number of other nationalities.
