= Menorca Sun =

The Menorca Sun is Menorca's only English language newspaper. Issued every Friday, it has a circulation of 5,000.
