= List of dragonflies of Menorca =

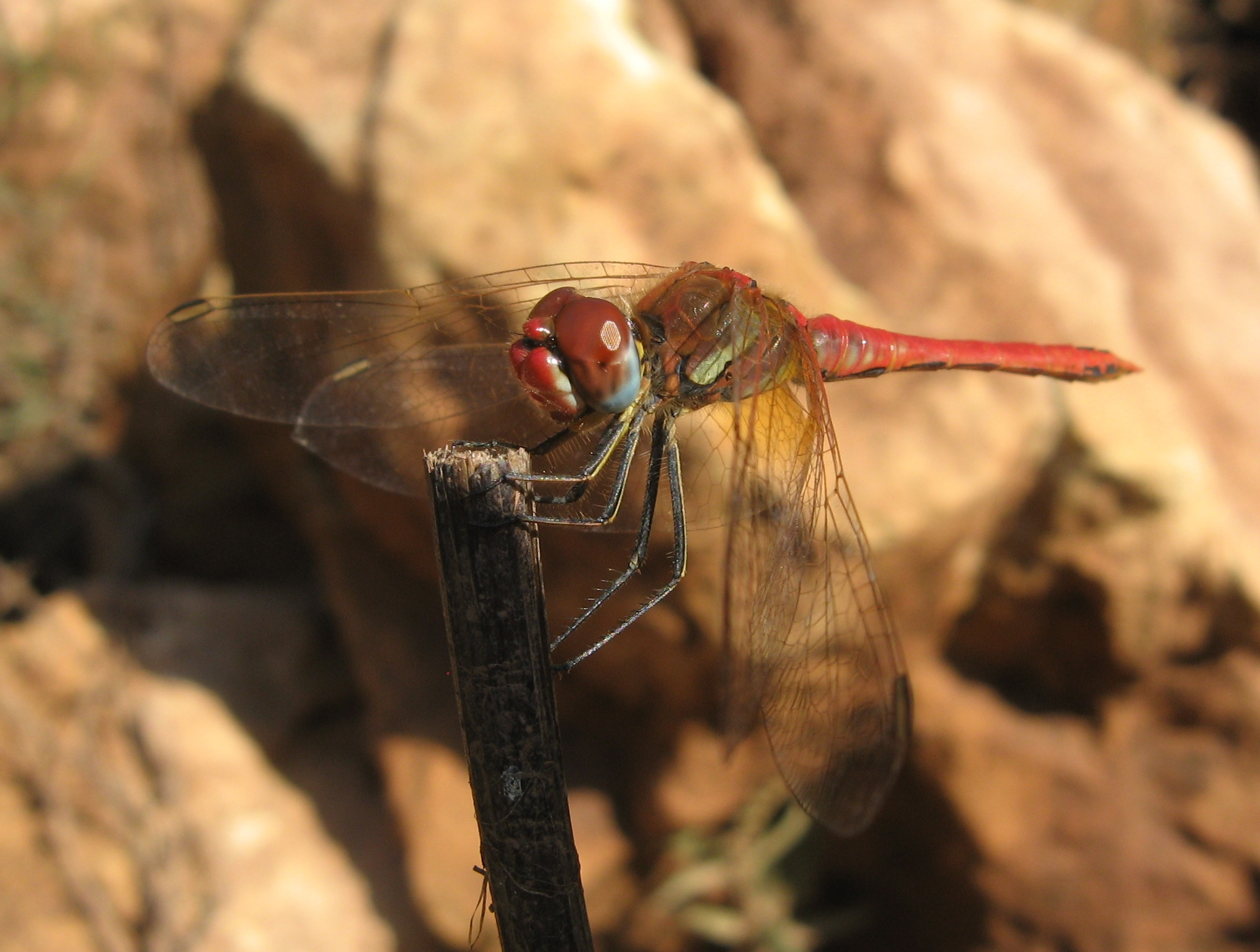
Sympetrum fonscolombii the red-veined darter, Algendar gorge, Menorca

Menorca is a small island in the Mediterranean Sea belonging to Spain. Along with Mallorca, Ibiza, and Formentera it is part of the Balearic Islands. It has a population of approximately 88,000. It is located 39°47' to 40°00'N, 3°52' to 4°24'E. It is a dry island without many wetlands or river systems; many of the wetlands in Menorca were drained to provide agricultural land. Despite this dragonflies are abundant on Menorca and in summer any pool of water will be alive with them. The best months to see dragonflies are May to September.

The taxonomy follows that of Dijkstra, K-D.B & Lewington, R. (2006).

== Suborder Zygoptera (damselflies) ==
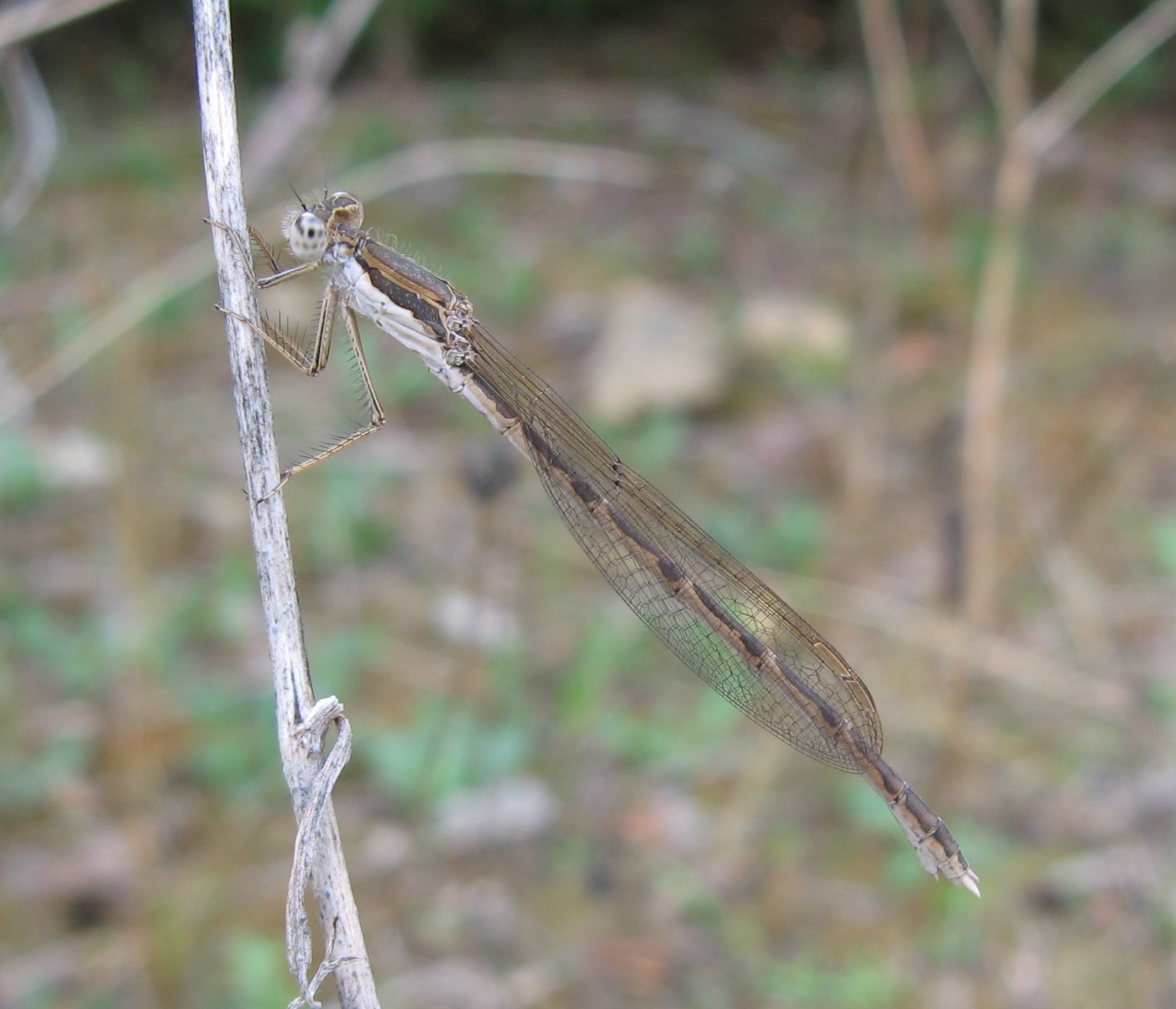
Sympecma fusca, Binixems, Menorca

Family Calopterygidae (demoiselles)

- Calopteryx haemorrhoidalis, copper demoiselle - locally abundant in the right habitat

Family Lestidae (emerald damselflies or spreadwings)

- Sympecma fusca, winter damselfly - can be found in the winter months as S. fusca overwinters as an adult.
- Lestes viridis (Chalcolestes viridis), willow emerald damselfly - locally abundant
- Lestes barbarus, southern emerald damselfly - scarce

Family Coenagrionidae (blue, blue-tailed and red damselflies)

- Ischnura elegans, blue-tailed damselfly - common all over the island.
- Ceriagrion tenellum, small red damselfly - local
- Coenagrion caerulescens, Mediterranean bluet - rare
- Erythromma lindenii (Cercion lindenii), blue-eye, also called the goblet-marked damselfly.

== Suborder Anisoptera (dragonflies) ==
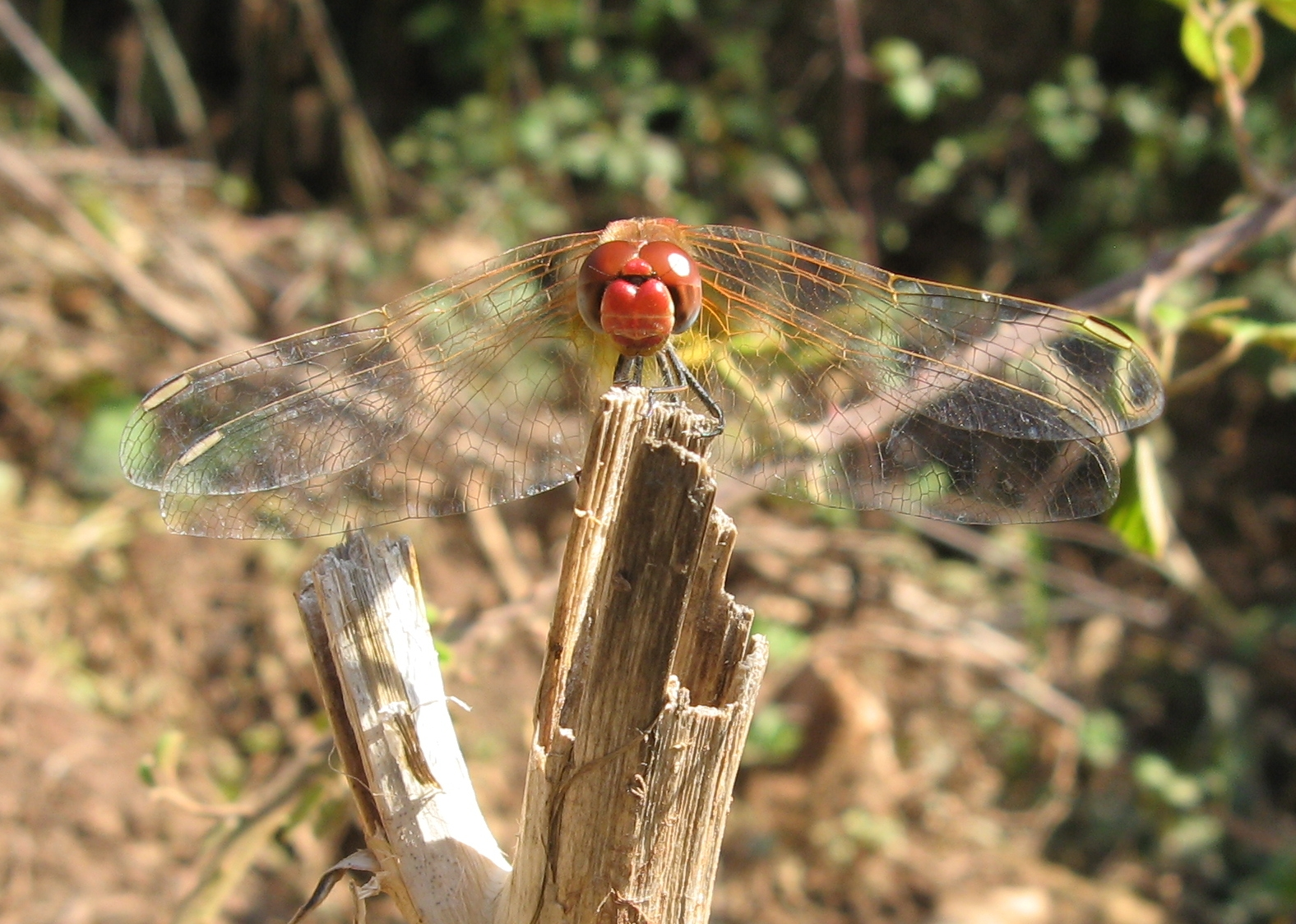
Sympetrum fonscolombii the red-veined darter, Algendar gorge, Menorca

Family Aeshnidae (hawkers and emperors)

- Aeshna affinis, blue-eyed hawker
- Aeshna mixta, migrant hawker

A. affinis and A. mixta are very alike in appearance. Blue aeshna are frequently seen in late summer but there are not many positive identifications of either species on record.

- Aeshna isoceles often put into the genus Anaciaeschna, green-eyed hawker - this species flies early in the year and is the only brown aeshna found on Menorca. Can be seen in the Algendar gorge.
- Anax imperator, emperor dragonfly also called blue emperor - common
- Anax parthenope, lesser emperor

Family Libellulidae (chasers, skimmers and darters)

- Libellula depressa, broad-bodied chaser
- Orthetrum cancellatum, black-tailed skimmer - fairly common
- Orthetrum coerulescens, keeled skimmer - fairly common
- Sympetrum striolatum, common darter - common
- Sympetrum fonscolombii, red-veined darter - common
- crocothemis erythraea, scarlet dragonfly or broad scarlet - fairly common

Most darters seen in Menorca with a very red colouring are S. fonscolombii but some are C. erythraea which occurs in many of the same locations. On close observation these two species can be told apart as they have quite different body shapes. Also S. fonscolombii usually oviposits in tandem whereas female C. erythraea oviposit solo.

== See also ==
- List of butterflies of Menorca
