= List of butterflies of Menorca =

Menorca is a small island in the Mediterranean Sea belonging to Spain, with a population of approximately 88,000. It is located 39°47' to 40°00'N, 3°52' to 4°24'E. There is good data on the butterflies of Menorca although it is not easy to find as most field guides do not give data on the smaller Mediterranean islands. A good source in English is Butterflies of Menorca which lists 26 species and gives data on flight period and abundance.

Butterflies can be seen in all months of the year but the best months are May to September; the only butterfly not to fly in this period is the green hairstreak which usually flies from February to April, but if the season is late it can be seen into May.

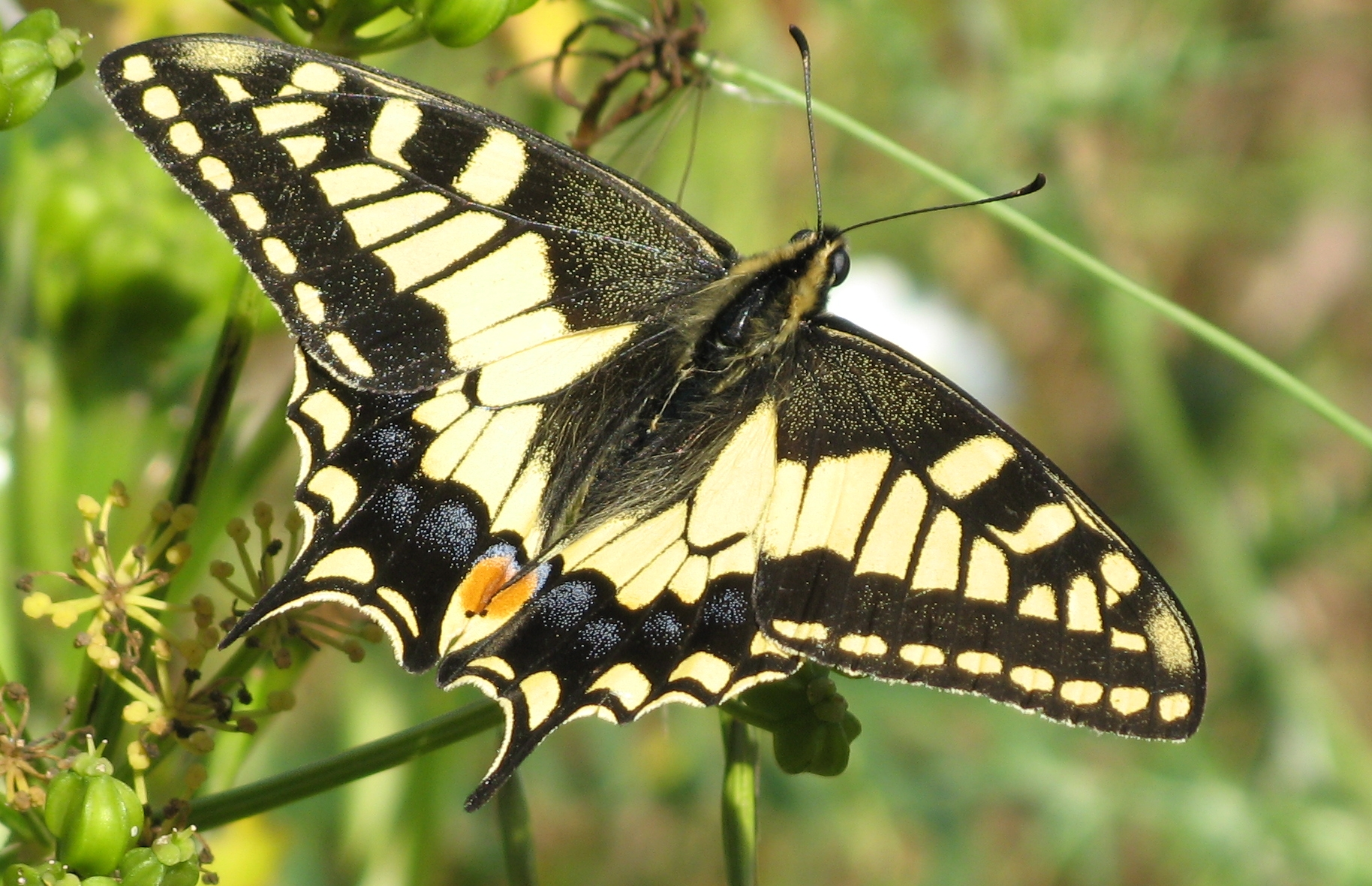
Swallowtail, Menorca

== Papilionidae ==
Swallowtails

- Papilio machaon, swallowtail

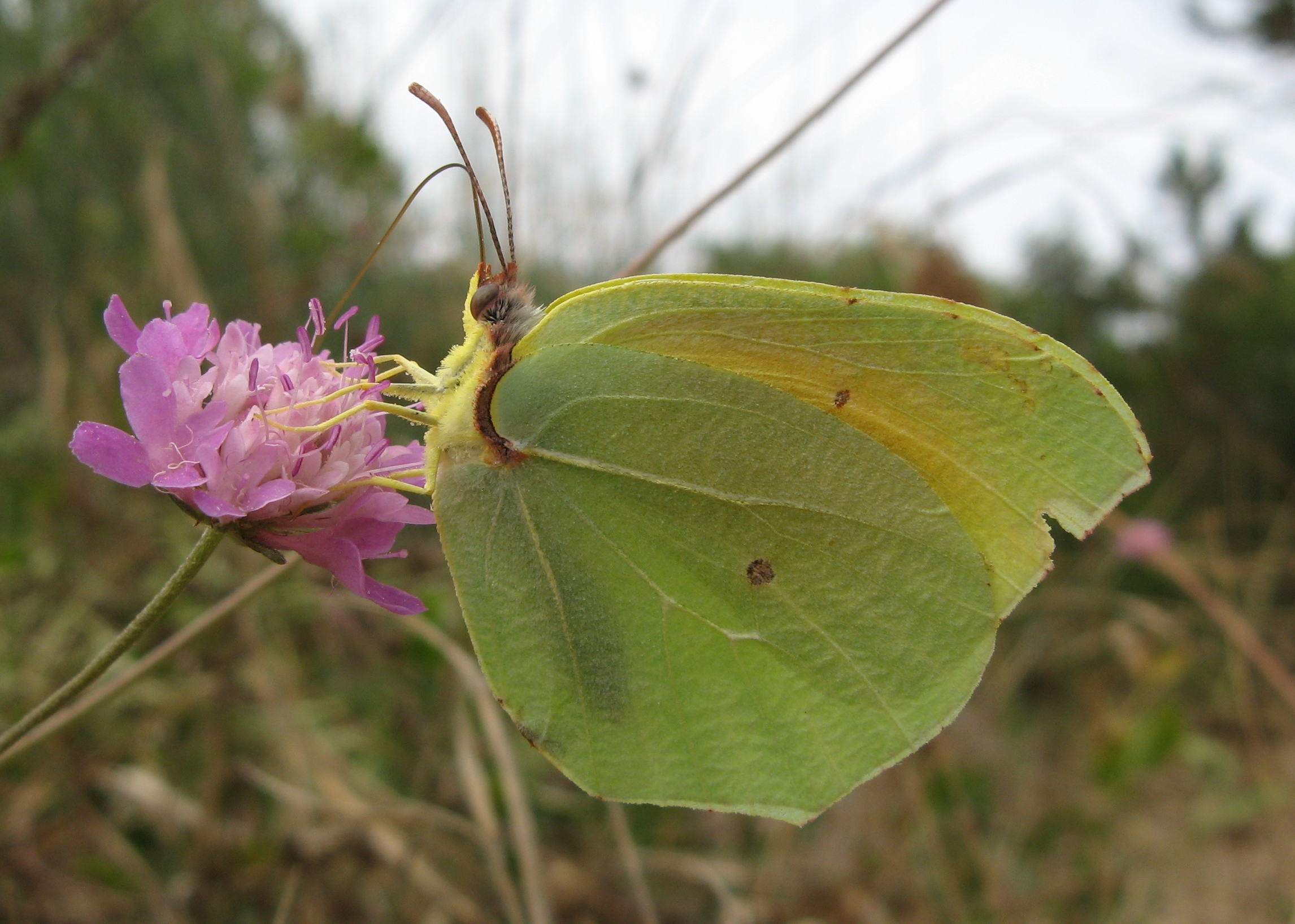
Cleopatra, Algendar gorge, Menorca

== Pieridae ==
Whites

- Colias crocea, clouded yellow
- Gonepteryx cleopatra, Cleopatra (common)
- Gonepteryx rhamni, brimstone (rare; very few good records - Brimstones on Menorca maybe scarce migrants from the Spanish mainland but in the field it is hard to tell apart from the very common Cleopatra so it is probably under reported.)
- Leptidea sinapis, wood white (uncommon woodland species)
- Pieris brassicae, large white
- Pieris rapae, small white
- Pieris napi, green-veined white
- Pontia daplidice, Bath white

== Nymphalidae ==
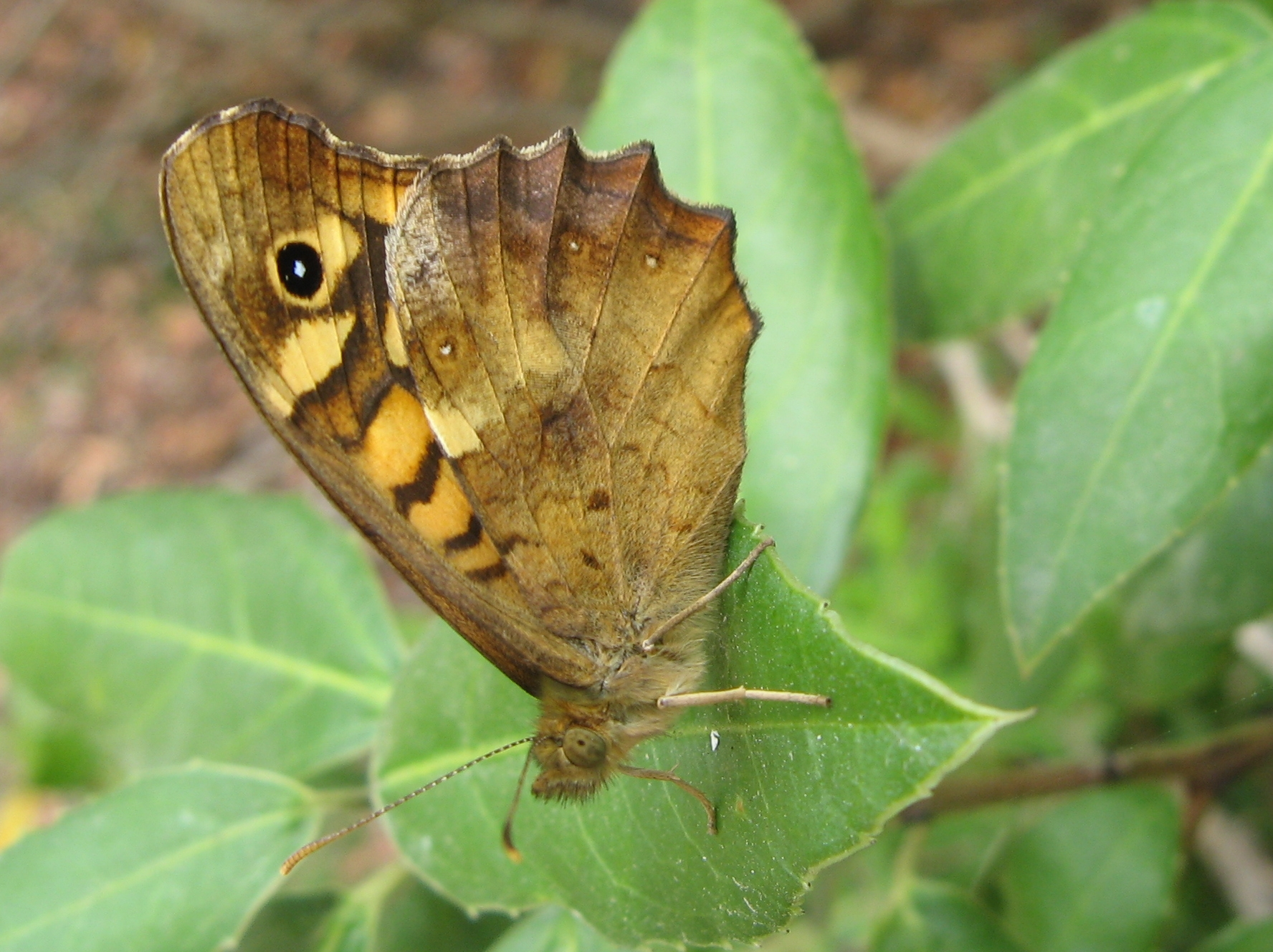
Speckled wood aegeria sub-species, Algendar gorge, Menorca

=== Satyrinae ===
Browns

- Coenonympha pamphilus, small heath
- Maniola jurtina, meadow brown (abundant)
- Pararge aegeria, speckled wood (abundant - The speckled wood found on Menorca is the aegeria sub-species which has an orange background colour.)
- Lasiommata megera, wall (subspecies paramegera occurs as well as the nominate form.)
- Lasiommata maera, large wall (very rare probably extinct)
- Hipparchia semele, grayling (very rare probably extinct)
- Hipparchia statilinus, tree grayling (very rare probably extinct)
- Pyronia cecilia, southern gatekeeper (common)

=== Danainae ===
Monarchs

- Danaus chrysippus, plain tiger (The plain tiger is a migrant that is sometimes seen on Menorca.)

=== Nymphalinae ===
- Vanessa atalanta, red admiral
- Vanessa cardui, painted lady
- Charaxes jasius, two-tailed pasha (uncommon woodland species)

== Lycaenidae ==
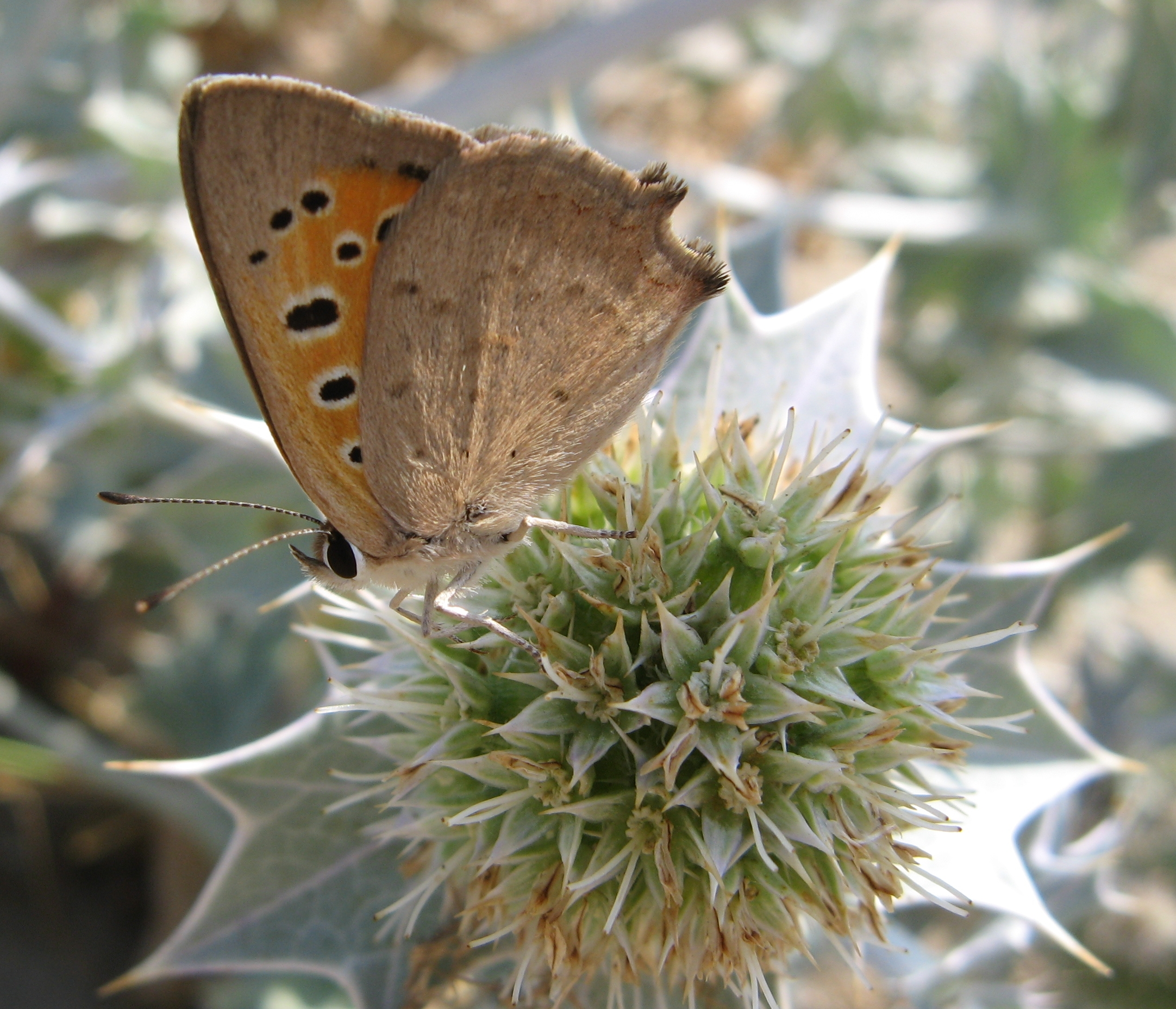
Small copper, Binigaus, Menorca

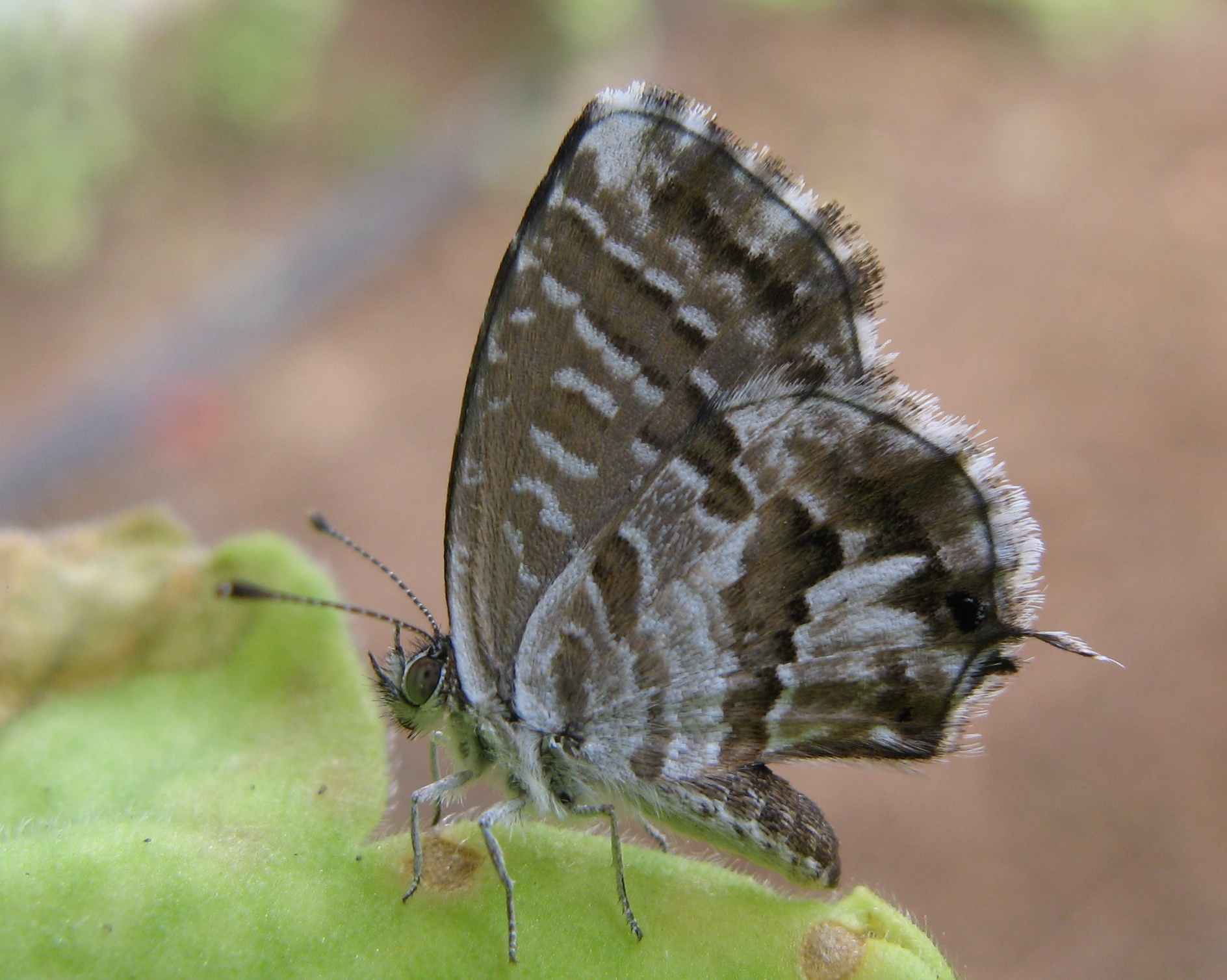
Geranium bronze on a geranium leaf, Cala Alcaufa, Menorca

Blues

- Polyommatus icarus, common blue (abundant, seen all over the island)
- Lysandra bellargus, Adonis blue (uncommon)
- Aricia cramera, southern brown argus (fairly common - May be confused with female common blue.)
- Celastrina argiolus, holly blue (common)
- Lampides boeticus, long-tailed blue (local)
- Leptotes pirithous, Lang's short-tailed blue (local)
- Lycaena phlaeas, small copper (local)
- Callophrys rubi, green hairstreak (flies very early; February to April)
- Cacyreus marshalli, geranium bronze (can be seen year round - The geranium bronze is not a native to Menorca. In 1990 it was introduced, accidentally, to Mallorca on imported Pelargonium from South Africa. The butterflies quickly spread to Menorca and other islands as well as to southern Spain and Italy. They are often seen in gardens on geranium plants.)

== See also ==
- List of dragonflies of Menorca
