= Es Mercadal =

- Municipality
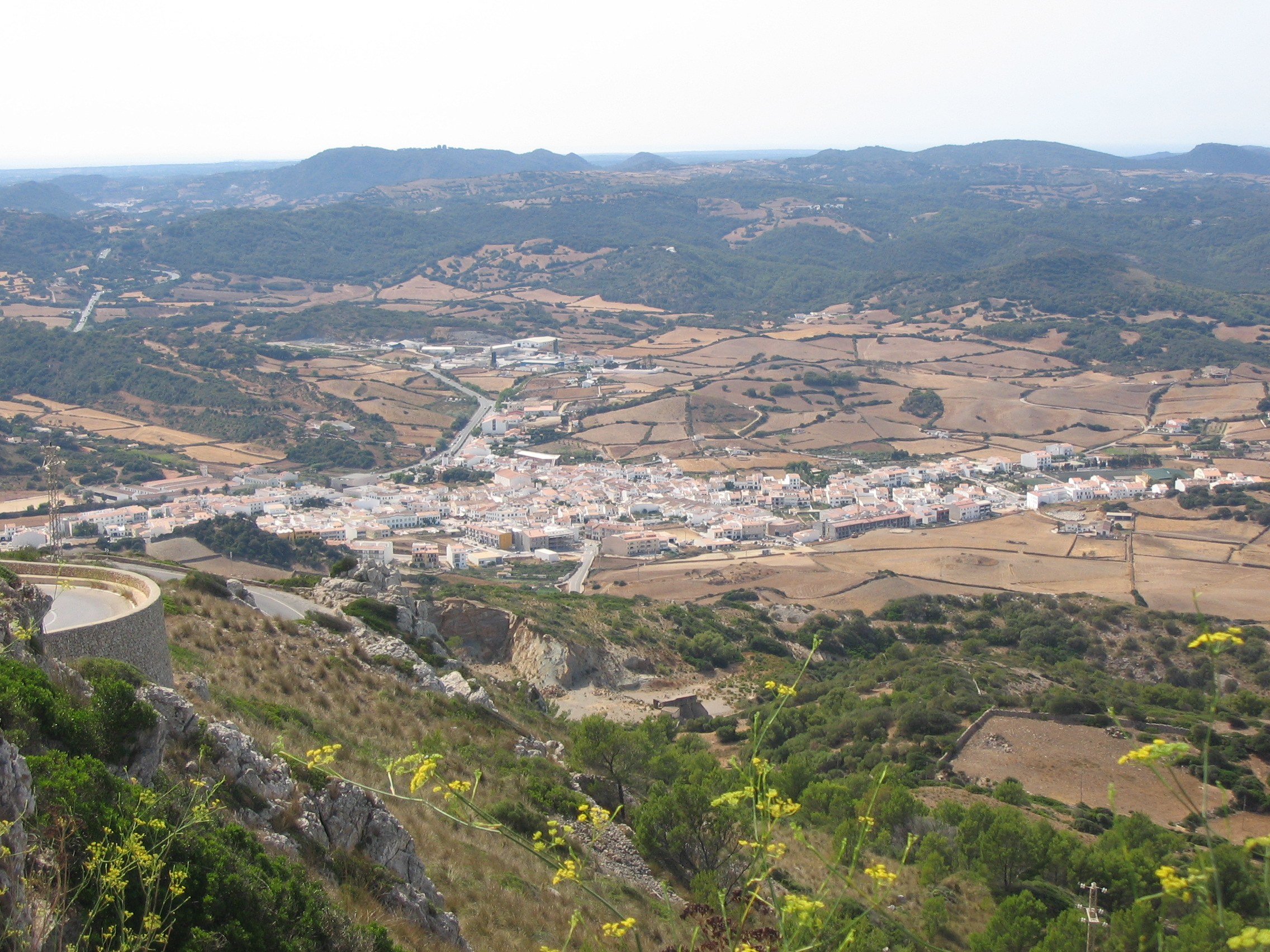
- Es Mercadal

- Coat of arms

- Location of Es Mercadal in Menorca

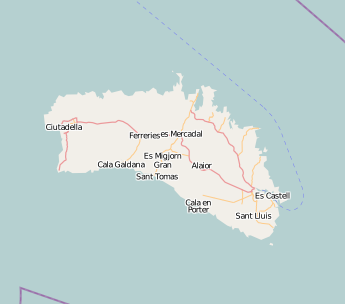
- Location in Menorca Es Mercadal (Balearic Islands) Es Mercadal (Spain)
- Coordinates: 39°59′14″N 4°5′36″E
- Country: Spain
- Autonomous Community: Balearic Islands
- Province: Balearic Islands
- Island: Menorca

Government
  - Mayor: Francisco Javier Ametller Pons (PSOE)

Area
  - Total: 138 km^{2} (53 sq mi)
- Elevation (AMSL): 71 m (233 ft)

Population (2025-01-01)
  - Total: 6,459
  - Density: 46.8/km^{2} (121/sq mi)
- Time zone: UTC+1 (CET)
  - Summer (DST): UTC+2 (CEST (GMT +2))
- Postal code: 07740
- Area code: +34 (Spain) + 971 (Baleares)
- Website: Town Hall

Es Mercadal (Balearic Catalan: [əz məɾkəˈðal]) is a town and municipality in northern Menorca in the Spanish Balearic Islands.

== Etymology ==
The name "Mercadal" derives from the Latin language mercatum, meaning "market". In 1301, King James II of Majorca decreed the establishment of a public center of commerce in Menorca, and the bustling open-air marketplace remains a principal attraction of the island to this day.

== Features ==
Mercadal is dominated by Mount Toro (El Toro), the highest point on the island. In mid-July, Mercadal is the site of traditional Menorcan festivities dedicated to the Roman Catholic saint Martin (Sant Martí).
