= Ferreries =

- Municipality
- Coat of arms

- Map of Ferreries in Menorca

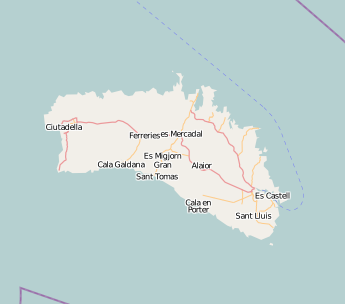
- Location in Menorca Ferreries (Balearic Islands) Ferreries (Spain)
- Coordinates: 39°59′1″N 4°0′44″E
- Country: Spain
- Autonomous community: Balearic Islands
- Province: Balearic Islands
- Judicial district: Ciudadela

Government
  - Mayor: Joana Febrer Rotger

Area
  - Total: 66.09 km^{2} (25.52 sq mi)
- Elevation: 142 m (466 ft)

Population (2025-01-01)
  - Total: 5,170
  - Density: 78.2/km^{2} (203/sq mi)
- Demonym: Ferrerencs
- Time zone: UTC+1 (CET)
  - Summer (DST): UTC+2 (CEST)
- Postal code: 07750
- Dialing code: 97137
- Website: Official website

Ferreries (Balearic Catalan: [fərəˈɾi.əs]) is a town and municipality on the island of Menorca, in the Spanish autonomous community of the Balearic Islands. Covering approximately 67 km^{2} (26 sq mi), it forms a natural transition between the island’s northern cliffs and southern sandy coves and beaches. The environment blends Mediterranean forests, limestone ravines to the south, and farmlands. The town’s economy is diversified across agriculture, livestock, manufacturing, and tourism.

== History ==
Ferreries was founded at the end of the 13th century, originally around a church dedicated to Saint Bartholomew before gaining autonomy in 1836. An Arab castle was constructed during Moorish rule atop the Santa Àgueda hill and is accessible through an old road. Its name is derived from the Catalan word ferrer meaning "blacksmith", which in turn, comes from Latin word ferrum.

== Geography ==
Ferreries is a town and municipality on the island of Menorca, in the Spanish autonomous community of the Balearic Islands. Covering approximately 67 km^{2} (26 sq mi), it forms a natural transition between the island’s northern cliffs and southern sandy coves and beaches. It has an average elevation of around 140 m (460 ft) with Santa Àgueda hill at 264 m (866 ft) height being the island’s third-highest point. The topography consists of a mix of Mediterranean forest, farmland, limestone ravines, and sandy coves and cliffs.

== Economy ==
The economy is based on a strong agricultural and livestock sector producing milk, cheese, honey, artisanal bread, fruit, and vegetables. Seaside accommodation, hotels and weekly local markets offering produce and crafts have developed around the tourism industry.. Cultural life thrives through annual patronal festivals in late August honoring Sant Bartomeu, including traditional horse processions, year-round events, and a busy summer market culture.

== See also ==
- Castle of Santa Àgueda
