= Menorca =

Island in Spain

Menorca Minorca
- Flag of Menorca

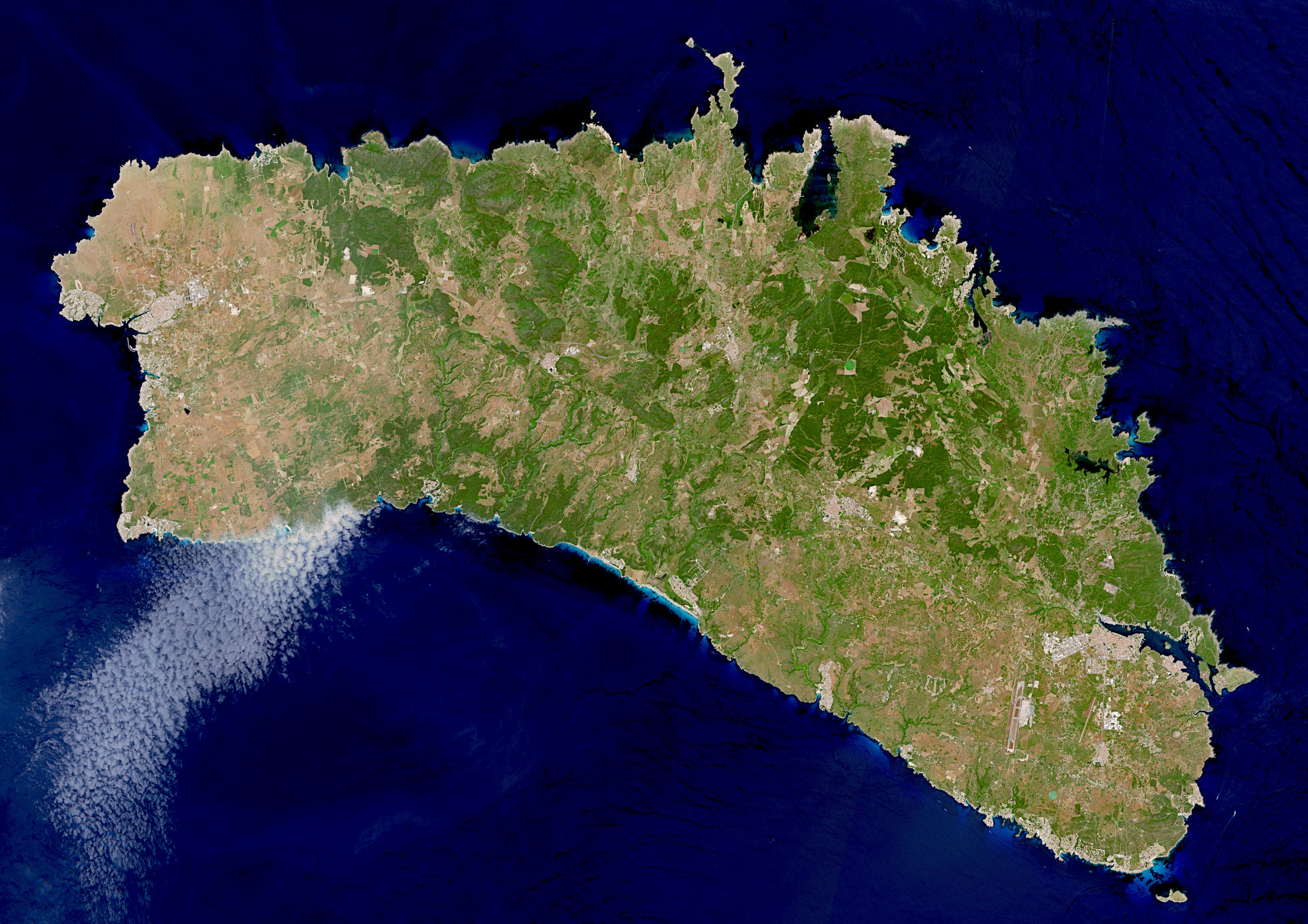
- Sentinel-2 image of Menorca

- Location within Balearic Islands Location within Spain
- Interactive map of Menorca; Minorca

Geography
- Location: Mediterranean Sea
- Coordinates: 39°58′N 4°05′E
- Archipelago: Balearic Islands
- Area: 695.8 km^{2} (268.6 sq mi)
- Highest elevation: 357 m (1171 ft)
- Highest point: Monte Toro

Administration
- Spain
- Autonomous Community: Balearic Islands
- Province: Balearic Islands
- Capital city: Mahón
- Largest settlement: Ciutadella de Menorca (pop. 30,006)
- Government: Island Council of Menorca
- President: Adolfo Vilafranca (PP)

Demographics
- Demonym: Menorcan
- Population: 102,477 (1 January 2025)
- Pop. density: 147,3/km^{2} (3815/sq mi)

Coat of arms of Menorca

Historical affiliations

Carthage 4th century BC– 201 BC
Roman Republic 123 BC–27 BC
Roman Empire 27 BC–455
Vandal Kingdom 455–534
Byzantine Empire 534–628
Umayyad state of Córdoba 903–1015
Taifa of Dénia 1015–1076
Taifa of Majorca 1076–1115
Almoravid Dynasty 1115–1158
Taifa of Majorca 1158–1203
Almohad Dynasty 1203–1229
Crown of Aragon (Taifa of Menorca) 1229/1231–1287
Crown of Aragon 1287–1298
Kingdom of Mallorca 1298–1343
Crown of Aragon 1343–1708
Kingdom of Great Britain 1708–1756
Kingdom of France 1756–1763
Kingdom of Great Britain 1763–1782
Kingdom of Spain 1782–1798
Kingdom of Great Britain 1798–1800
United Kingdom of Great Britain and Ireland 1801–1802
Kingdom of Spain 1802–1808
Kingdom of Spain 1813–1931
Second Spanish Republic 1931–1939
Spanish State 1939–1978
Spain 1978–present
Balearic Islands 1983–present

Menorca (Note: Local pronunciation: Balearic Catalan: [məˈnɔɾkə]; Spanish: [meˈnoɾka]) or Minorca (Note: English pronunciation: /mɪˈnɔːrkə/, min-OR-kə) (from Latin: Insula Minor, lit. 'smaller island', later Minorica) is one of the Balearic Islands located in the Mediterranean Sea belonging to Spain. Its name derives from its size, contrasting it with nearby Mallorca (Majorca). Its capital is Mahón, situated on the island's eastern end, although Menorca is not a province and forms a political union with the other islands in the archipelago. Ciutadella de Menorca and Mahón are the main ports and largest towns.

Per the Census of 1 January 2025, Menorca had a population of 102,477. Its highest point, a hill in the middle of the island named El Toro (from Catalan "turó" meaning hill), is 358 metres (1,175 feet) above sea level.

== History ==
The island is known for its collection of megalithic stone monuments: navetes, taules and talaiots, which indicate very early prehistoric human activity. Some of the earliest culture on Menorca was influenced by other Mediterranean cultures, including the Greek Minoans of ancient Crete (see also Gymnesian Islands). For example, the use of inverted plastered timber columns at Knossos is thought to have influenced early peoples of Menorca in imitating this practice.

The end of the Punic Wars saw an increase in piracy in the western Mediterranean. The Roman occupation of Hispania had meant a growth of maritime trade between the Iberian and Italian peninsulas. Pirates took advantage of the strategic location of the Balearic Islands to raid Roman commerce, using both Menorca and Mallorca as bases. In reaction to this, the Romans invaded Menorca. By 123 BC, both islands were fully under Roman control, later being incorporated into the province of Hispania Citerior.

In 13 BC, Roman emperor Augustus reorganised the provincial system and the Balearic Islands became part of the Tarraconensis imperial province. The ancient town of Mago (Mahón) was transformed from a Carthaginian to a Roman town.

=== Jews of Menorca ===
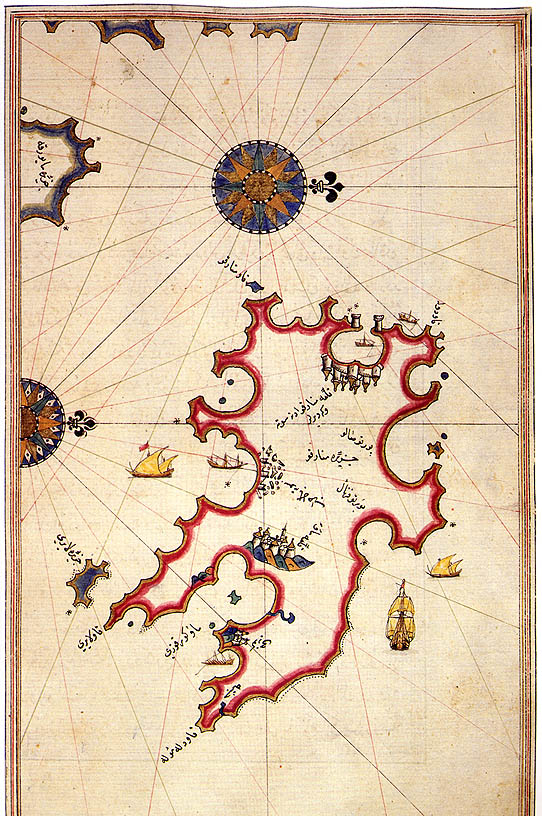
Historic map of Minorca by Piri Reis

The island had a Jewish population. The Letter on the Conversion of the Jews by a fifth-century bishop named Severus tells of the forced conversion of the island's 540 Jewish men and women in AD 418. Several Jews, including Theodore, a rich representative Jew who stood high in the estimation of his coreligionists and of Christians alike, underwent baptism. The act of conversion brought about, within a previously peaceful coexisting community, the expulsion of the ruling Jewish elite into the bleak hinterlands, the burning of synagogues, and the gradual reinstatement of certain Jewish families after the forced acceptance of Christianity, allowing the survival of those Jewish families who had not already perished. Many Jews secretly retained their Jewish faith while outwardly professing Christian beliefs. Some of these Jews form part of the Xueta community.

When Menorca became a British possession in 1713, they actively encouraged the immigration of foreign non-Catholics, which included Jews who were not accepted by the predominantly Christian inhabitants. When the Jewish community in Mahón requested the use of a room as a synagogue, their request was refused, and they were denounced by the clergy. In 1781, when Louis des Balbes de Berton de Crillon, 1st Duke of Mahón invaded Menorca, he ordered all Jews to leave in four days. At that time, the around 500-strong Jewish community was transported from Menorca in four Spanish ships to the port of Marseille.

=== Middle Ages ===
The Vandals easily conquered the island in the fifth century. The Byzantine Empire recovered it in 534. Following the Umayyad conquest of Hispania, Menorca was annexed to the Caliphate of Córdoba in 903, with many Muslims emigrating to the island.

Manûrqa (Arabic: منورقة) was the Arabicized name given to the island by the Muslims from its annexation to the Caliphate of Cordoba by 'Isâm al-Khawlânî in 903 until the rule of the last Muslim ra'îs, Abû 'Umar ibn Sa'îd in 1287. The only urban centre of the island was Madînat al Jazîra or al Manûrqa (modern Ciutadella). Most of the population lived in small farm communities organized under a tribal structure.

In 1231, after Christian forces took Mallorca, Menorca chose to become an independent Islamic state, albeit one tributary to King James I of Aragon. The island was ruled first by Abû 'Uthmân Sa'îd Hakam al Qurashi (1234–1282), and following his death by his son, Abû 'Umar ibn Sa'îd (1282–1287).

A Catalan-Aragonese invasion, led by Alfonso III (also known as Count of Barcelona Alfons II), came on 17 January 1287; its anniversary is now celebrated as Menorca's national day. Once the island was captured, most of its Muslim inhabitants were enslaved and sold in the slave markets of Eivissa, Valencia and Barcelona, while others became Christians.

After the Christian conquest of 1287, the island was part of the Crown of Aragon. For some time it was ceded to the Kingdom of Mallorca, a vassal state of the Crown, but it was retaken by the king of Aragon in 1343. Eventually the Crown of Aragon merged with the Crown of Castile, and so Menorca became part of Spain.

During the 16th century, Turkish naval attacks destroyed Mahón, and the then capital, Ciutadella. In Mahón, Barbary pirates from North Africa took considerable booty and as many as 6,000 slaves. Various Spanish kings, including Philip III and Philip IV, styled themselves "King of Minorca" as a subsidiary title.

=== British rule ===
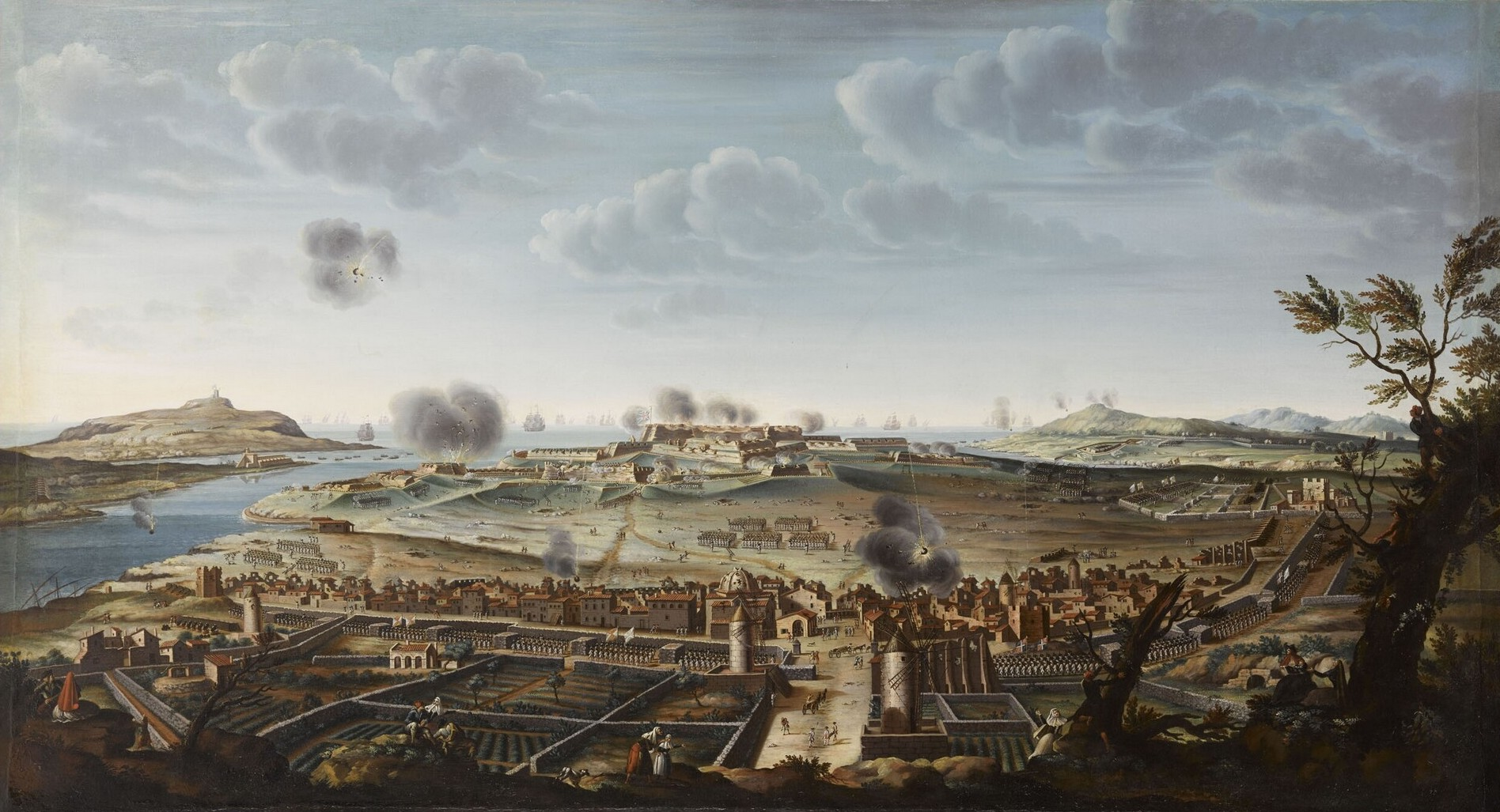
The siege of Fort St. Philip in 1756

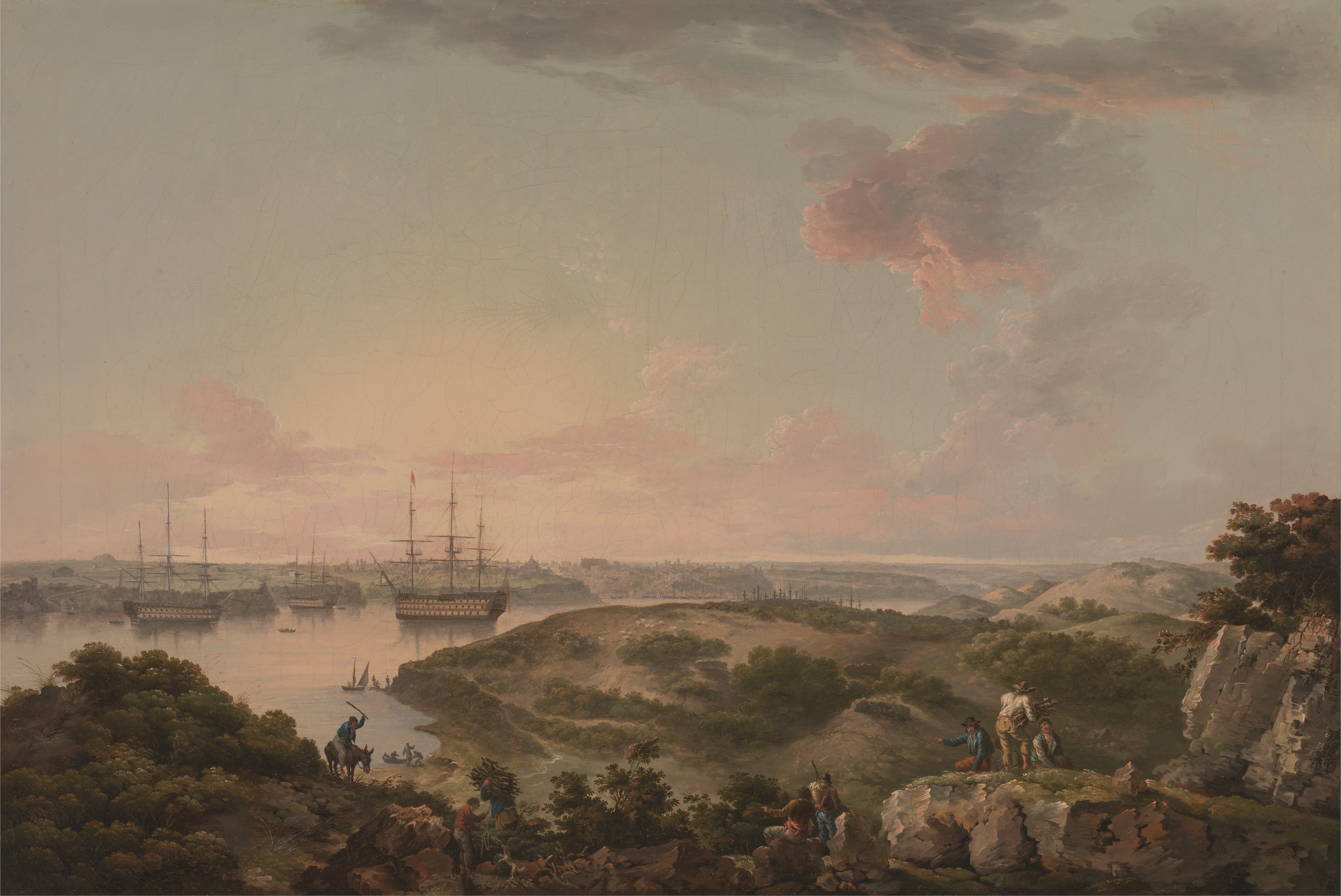
British warships at anchor in Mahón after the 1798 capture of Menorca

Anglo-Dutch forces captured Menorca in 1708 during the War of the Spanish Succession. The island became a British possession and was formally ceded to Great Britain by Spain in the 1713 Peace of Utrecht. Governed by a succession of British Army officers, during the period of British rule Menorca's capital was moved to Mahón and a Royal Navy base established in the town's harbour. Menorca remained a British possession until 1756, when French forces captured it during the Seven Years' War after repulsing a British relief attempt. However, Britain's victory in the war led the island to be ceded back to them in the 1763 Treaty of Paris. In 1782, Franco-Spanish forces captured the island during the American Revolutionary War, and Britain ceded the island back to Spain in the 1783 Peace of Paris. The British once again captured Menorca in 1798 during the French Revolutionary Wars, though they ceded it back to Spain in 1802 Treaty of Amiens.

=== Renewed Spanish rule ===
As with the rest of the Balearic Islands, Menorca was not occupied by the French during the Peninsular War, as it was successfully protected by the Royal Navy, this time allied to Spain.

A quarantine station (lazaretto), Llatzaret (Catalan), was constructed from 1793 to 1807 next to the entrance to Mahón. It served ships from North Africa wishing to reach the Iberian Peninsula or the ports of the Balearic Islands. Lazarettos confined the crews of ships that were suspected of carrying infectious diseases, such as the plague. The crew needed to spend up to 40 days within its walls until it was clear there was no infection or until the sick recovered. It is now a national monument and can only be reached as part of an official tour.

From 1815 until the mid-19th century, the U.S. Navy developed its Mediterranean headquarters at Mahón, leaving behind the English Cemetery, which was restored by the Spanish government in 2008 and is maintained in the 21st century.

=== Since 1900 ===
During the Spanish Civil War, Menorca stayed loyal to the Second Spanish Republic, while the rest of the Balearic Islands supported the Spanish Nationalists. The island did not see ground combat, but it was a target of aerial bombing by the pro-Nationalist Italian Corpo Truppe Volontarie. Many Menorcans were also killed when taking part in a failed invasion of Mallorca. During the Pedro Marqués Barber era (July–December 1936) some Mallorcans and a priest were executed on the island. After the Nationalist victory in the Battle of Minorca in February 1939, the Royal Navy assisted in a peaceful transition of power in Menorca and the evacuation of some political refugees aboard HMS Devonshire.

In October 1993, Menorca was designated by UNESCO as a biosphere reserve. In July 2005, the island's application to become the 25th member of the International Island Games Association was approved.

== Climate ==
As the major part of Balearic Islands, Menorca has a mediterranean climate (Köppen: Csa), with mild winters and hot summers. Menorca is generally wetter than Mallorca, with rainfall peaking in late autumn. Average annual highs range between 14 °C (57 °F) in winter to 29 °C (84 °F) in summer. Due to its offshore position and the small size of the island, temperatures are generally quite stable.

Climate data for Mahón – Minorca Airport 91m (1981–2010 normals, extremes 1965–present)
Month	Jan	Feb	Mar	Apr	May	Jun	Jul	Aug	Sep	Oct	Nov	Dec	Year
Record high °C (°F)	21.5 (70.7)	21.6 (70.9)	27.2 (81.0)	27.7 (81.9)	30.7 (87.3)	34.4 (93.9)	39.6 (103.3)	39.0 (102.2)	34.5 (94.1)	31.3 (88.3)	25.4 (77.7)	21.6 (70.9)	39.6 (103.3)
Mean maximum °C (°F)	17.6 (63.7)	18.0 (64.4)	20.6 (69.1)	22.5 (72.5)	26.5 (79.7)	31.2 (88.2)	33.0 (91.4)	33.2 (91.8)	29.7 (85.5)	26.4 (79.5)	22.4 (72.3)	19.0 (66.2)	34.0 (93.2)
Mean daily maximum °C (°F)	14.1 (57.4)	14.2 (57.6)	15.9 (60.6)	18.0 (64.4)	21.6 (70.9)	25.8 (78.4)	28.9 (84.0)	29.2 (84.6)	26.2 (79.2)	22.7 (72.9)	18.1 (64.6)	15.2 (59.4)	20.8 (69.4)
Daily mean °C (°F)	10.8 (51.4)	10.8 (51.4)	12.3 (54.1)	14.3 (57.7)	17.8 (64.0)	21.8 (71.2)	24.9 (76.8)	25.4 (77.7)	22.6 (72.7)	19.4 (66.9)	14.9 (58.8)	12.1 (53.8)	17.2 (63.0)
Mean daily minimum °C (°F)	7.5 (45.5)	7.4 (45.3)	8.6 (47.5)	10.6 (51.1)	13.9 (57.0)	17.8 (64.0)	20.8 (69.4)	21.5 (70.7)	18.9 (66.0)	16.1 (61.0)	11.6 (52.9)	9.0 (48.2)	13.6 (56.5)
Mean minimum °C (°F)	3.6 (38.5)	3.2 (37.8)	4.6 (40.3)	6.6 (43.9)	10.4 (50.7)	13.7 (56.7)	17.4 (63.3)	17.9 (64.2)	15.0 (59.0)	11.1 (52.0)	6.8 (44.2)	4.5 (40.1)	2.2 (36.0)
Record low °C (°F)	−2.4 (27.7)	−1.1 (30.0)	−0.1 (31.8)	1.6 (34.9)	6.4 (43.5)	10.2 (50.4)	13.6 (56.5)	13.6 (56.5)	9.4 (48.9)	5.2 (41.4)	2.0 (35.6)	−1.0 (30.2)	−2.4 (27.7)
Average precipitation mm (inches)	52 (2.0)	54 (2.1)	38 (1.5)	45 (1.8)	37 (1.5)	14 (0.6)	3 (0.1)	20 (0.8)	61 (2.4)	78 (3.1)	88 (3.5)	61 (2.4)	546 (21.5)
Average precipitation days (≥ 1 mm)	7	7	6	6	4	2	1	2	5	7	8	9	64
Mean monthly sunshine hours	144	146	202	222	270	311	347	312	225	183	142	130	2,632
Source 1: Agencia Estatal de Meteorología
Source 2: Agencia Estatal de Meteorología

Climate data for Menorca
Month	Jan	Feb	Mar	Apr	May	Jun	Jul	Aug	Sep	Oct	Nov	Dec	Year
Average sea temperature °C (°F)	14.6 (58)	13.8 (57)	14.1 (57)	15.7 (60)	18.7 (66)	22.2 (72)	24.4 (76)	25.8 (78)	25.1 (77)	22.9 (73)	20.4 (69)	17.1 (63)	19.4 (67)
Average Ultraviolet index	2	3	5	6	8	9	9	8	6	4	2	2	5.3
Source #1: seatemperature.org
Source #2: Weather Atlas

== Culture ==
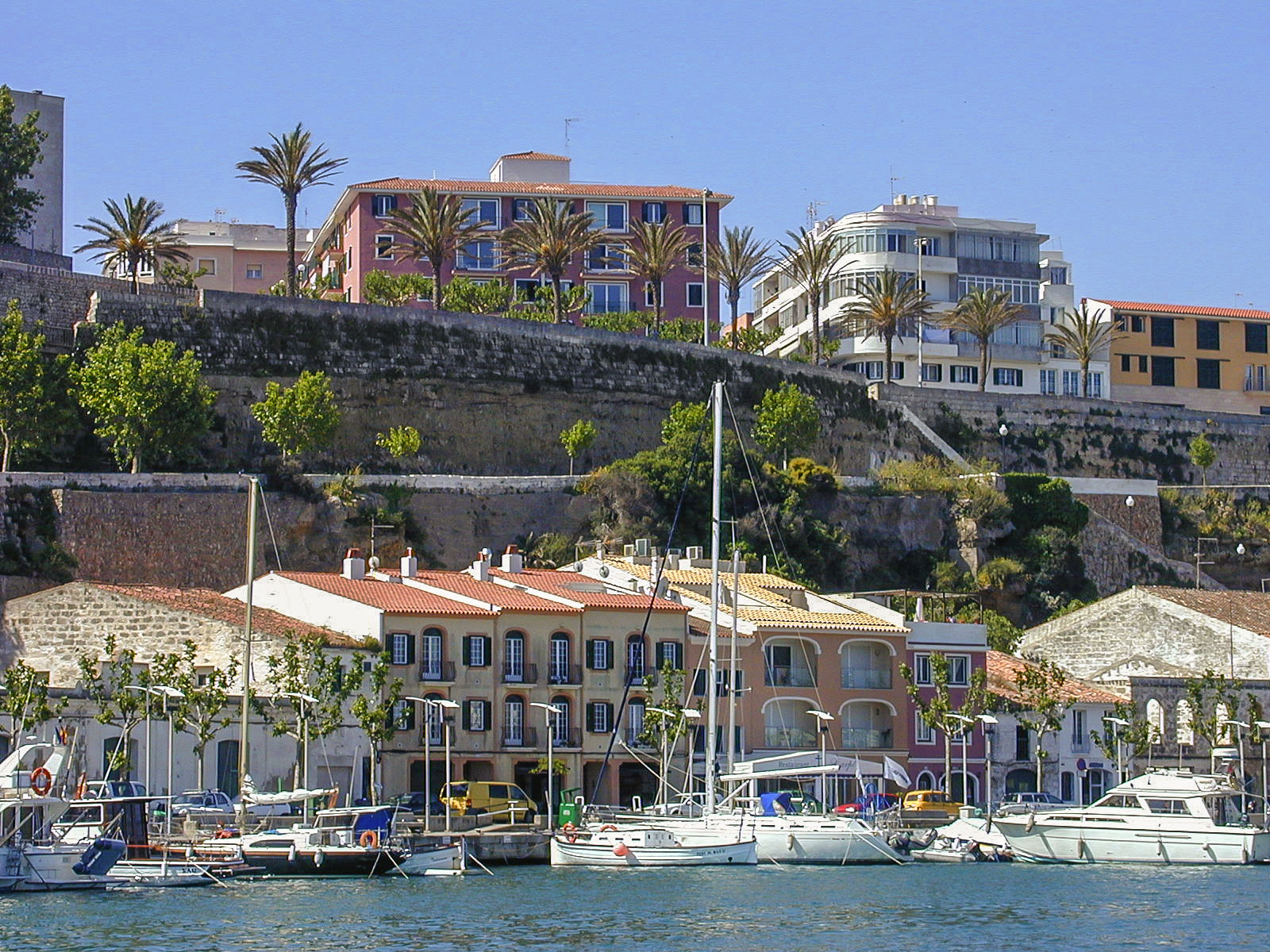
Port of Mahón

The location of Menorca in the middle of the western Mediterranean was a staging point for the different cultures since prehistoric times. This Balearic Island has a mix of colonial and local architecture.

The festes take place throughout the summer in different towns around the island, and have their origins in the early 14th century. The international opera week and international organ festival in Mahón, and the summer music festival and Capella Davidica concerts in Ciutadella are the main events of the island.

Menorca's cuisine is dominated by the Mediterranean diet, which is known to be very healthy. While many of the locals have adopted modern attitudes they still uphold certain old traditions.

=== Traditional celebrations ===
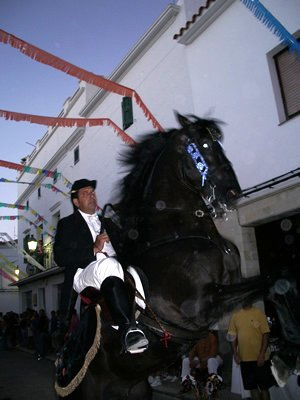
Menorquín horse ridden by caixer at festes

Menorca is especially well known for its traditional summer "festes", which intrigue many visitors. The Saint John's Feast is held annually in Ciutadella de Menorca, during 23–25 June. The festes last for three days. On the first day, a man bears a well-groomed sheep upon his shoulders and parades around the local streets. In the late evening, main streets are closed, and bonfires held upon them.

On the second day, locally bred black horses are dressed with ribbons and rosettes. The riders, or "caixers", ride the horses through the streets and, along with a tumultuous crowd of people, encourage them to rear up on their hind legs. The brave can be found running underneath them in an attempt to touch the horses hearts for good luck.

The third day sees intense competition between the riders in a harmless form of jousting that involves spearing a suspended ring with a lance at considerable speed. The festes are brought to a close with a firework display.

=== Sports ===
As a small island, Menorca offers limited opportunities to see top-level sport competitions. Football in Menorca is played at the fifth level of the Spanish football pyramid. There are currently 11 clubs contesting the Regional Preferente de Menorca, the champion of which progresses to the Tercera División Grupo XI playoffs. The winner of this playoff is promoted to Tercera División; the last Menorquí club to do so was CF Sporting Mahonés in 2009.

CV Ciutadella are a professional women's volleyball club who play in the Superliga Femenina, the top league of Spanish volleyball, having won the league championship in 2011 and 2012. They play at Pavelló Municipal d'Esports in Ciutadella.

A semi-professional basketball club, CB Menorca, play in the LEB Plata, the third level of Spanish basketball. Their home court is Pavelló Menorca in the Bintaufa neighborhood just outside of Mahón.

In recent years, some sporting events that gather hundreds of participants have been successfully held on a yearly basis, such as the triathlon race Extreme Man Menorca and the single-staged ultramarathon race Trail Menorca Camí de Cavalls. In 2014, it was announced that the island would host the 18th editions of the Island Games in 2019; however, Menorca later pulled out of hosting the event, citing a change of government as the main reason.

In 2025, the island began hosting Open Menorca, a professional tennis tournament on the ATP Challenger Tour.

=== Language ===
The two official languages are Catalan and Spanish. Natives to the island speak the variety of Catalan called Menorquí, and Spanish as well; many residents originating from the mainland are monolingual in Spanish. The language of education and of government is Catalan, with Spanish taught alongside it.

A 2014 survey carried out by the government of the Balearic Islands found that 53.5% of participants identified themselves as Catalan speakers, 36.7% as Spanish speakers, and 7.7% as bilingual speakers.

The most distinctive difference between Menorquí and standard Catalan, as with most Balearic dialects, is the word used for the article "the", where Menorquí uses "es" for masculine and "sa" for feminine. Menorquí thus shares the source of its article with many Sardinian varieties (masc. sing. su, fem sing. sa), rather than the standard Catalan "el" and "la", similar to other Romance languages (e.g. Spanish el, la, Italian il, la), corresponding to a form which was historically used along the Costa Brava of Catalonia, from where it is supposed that the islands were repopulated after being conquered from the Moors.

Menorquí also has a few English loan words dating back to the period of British rule, such as "grevi", "xumaquer", "boinder" and "xoc" taken from "gravy", "shoemaker", "bow window" and "chalk", respectively.

=== Food and drink ===
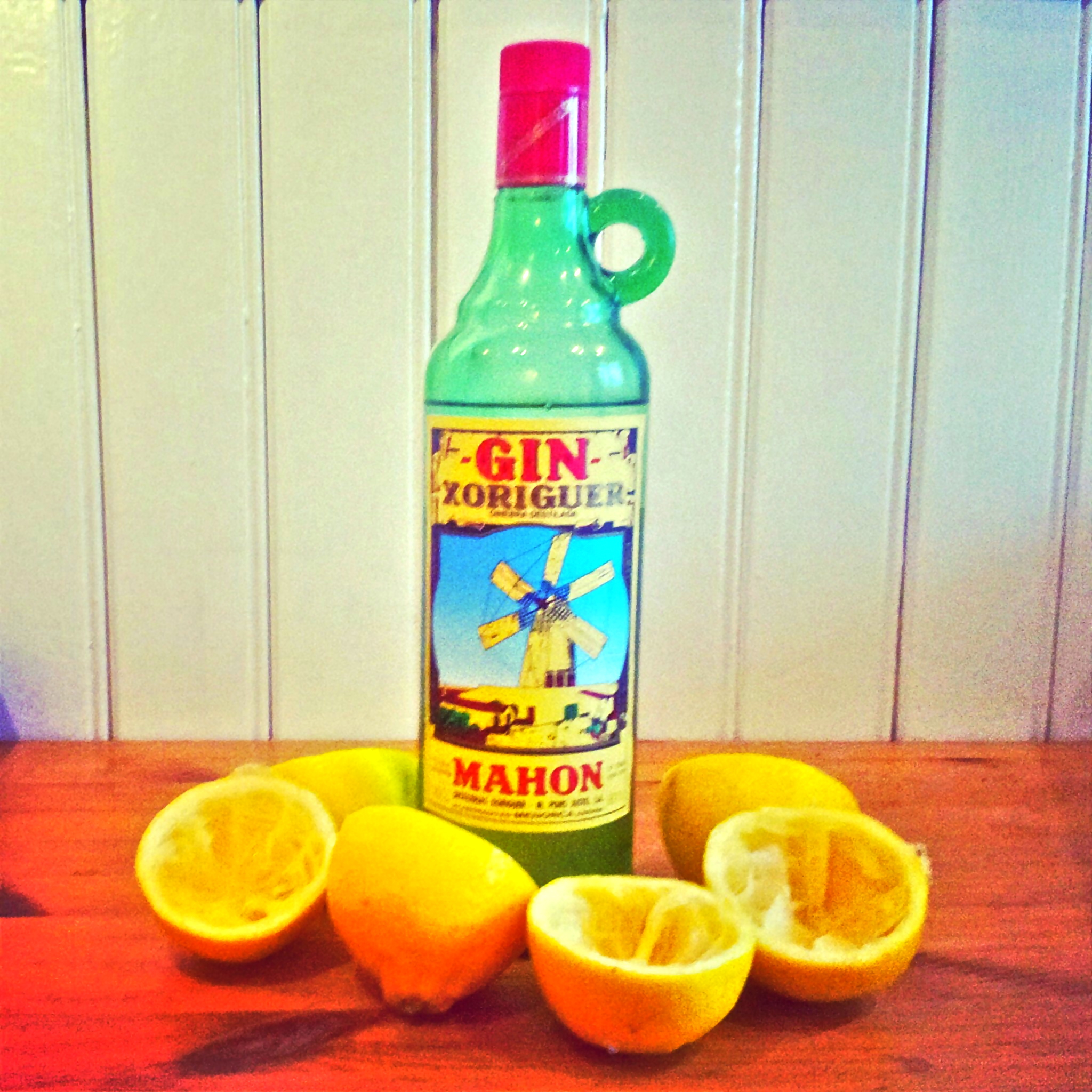
Bottle of Gin Xoriguer, the typical gin from Menorca. It is very often mixed with lemonade.

Wine production has been known on the island since ancient times, but it went into a heavy decline over the last century. Now, several new, small wineries have started up, producing wines locally.

Lingering British influence is seen in the Menorcans' taste for gin, which during local festes honoring towns' patron saints is mixed with lemonade (or bitter lemon) to make a golden liquid known as Pomada. Gin from Menorca (known as Gin de Minorca or Gin de Mahón) is not derived from grain alcohol but from wine alcohol (eau de vie de vin), making it more akin to brandy. It has the distinction to have geographical identity protection. Probably the best known gin is Gin Xoriguer which is named after the typical Menorcan windmill which was used to make the first gin.

Mayonnaise is thought to take its name from the capital of the island. According to this theory, it was first prepared by a French chef in 1756 as part of a victory feast after the capture of Mahón, Minorca. In those days, sauces were prepared by combining cream and eggs. The French chef needed cream to prepare a sauce, but there was none to be found. He therefore replaced it with olive oil, creating mayonnaise. The word 'mayonnaise' is the French for mahonesa, meaning from or belonging to Mahón ('Mahon' in French).

Also famous is Mahón cheese, "formatge de Maó", typical of the island.

Sweets known as flaons are one of the typical gastronomic products of Menorca.

== Wildlife ==
=== Flowers ===
Menorca is rich in wild flowers with over 900 species of flowering plants recorded. Many are those typical of the Mediterranean, but some are endemic. There are 24 or 25 species of orchid found and of these most flower early in the year in late March, April and May.

=== Insects ===
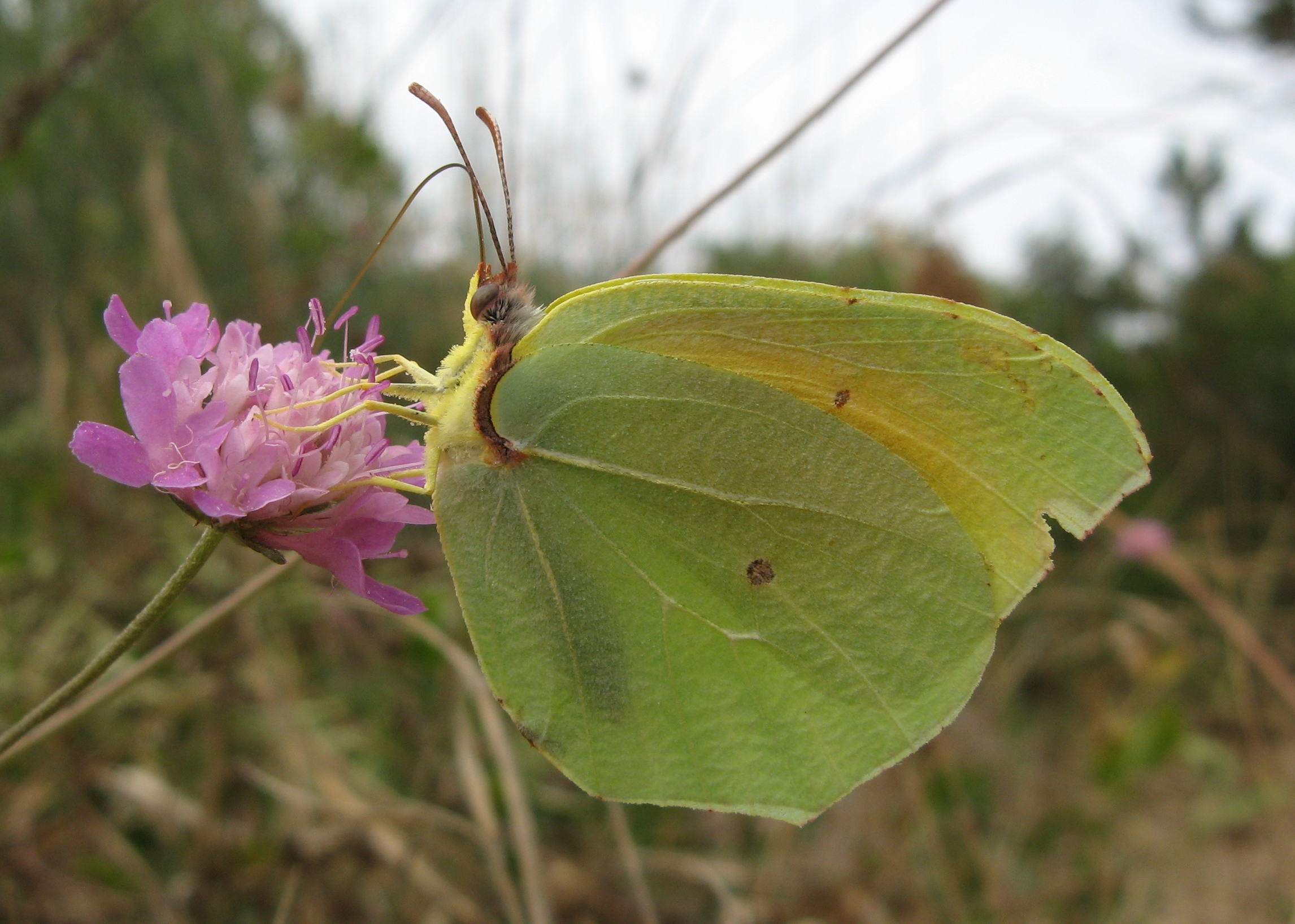
Cleopatra, Algendar gorge

30 species of butterflies have been recorded on Menorca and most are on the wing from March to late September. The species that occur include the Cleopatra, Lang's short tailed blue and the two-tailed pasha.
Despite not having many large wetlands dragonflies abound on Menorca. Seventeen species have been recorded including the emperor dragonfly.

- List of butterflies of Menorca
- List of dragonflies of Menorca

=== Reptiles and amphibians ===
There are three species of amphibians: green toad (Bufo viridis), marsh frog and stripeless tree frog (Hyla meridionalis). The common lizard seen all over the island is the Italian wall lizard (Podarcis siculus) although the Moroccan rock lizard (Scelaris perspicillata) also occurs. The Balearic endemic Lilford's wall lizard (Podarcis lilfordi) can be found on many of the offshore islands. Two species of gecko can be found on Menorca, the Moorish (Tarentola mauritanica) and the Turkish (Hemidactylus turcicus) also called the Mediterranean house gecko. Four species of snake occur: the viperine snake (Natrix maura), grass snake, false smooth snake (Macroprotodon cucullatus) and the ladder snake (Rhinechis scalaris).

Hermann's tortoise (Testudo hermanni) is quite common and can be found all over the island. Two terrapin species are also found, the native European pond terrapin (Emys orbicularis) and the introduced American red-eared slider (Trachemys scripta).

=== Birds ===
The birdlife of Menorca is very well known. Menorca is a well watched island which is on the migration route of many species and good number of passage migrants can be seen in spring. Residents include Audouin's gull, blue rock thrush and Thekla lark. Booted eagle and red kite are easy to see as is Egyptian vulture in the right habitat. In summer there are bee-eaters and Menorca has major colonies of Cory's shearwater and Balearic shearwater.

=== Mammals ===
Menorca has no large native mammals. There are some small mammals including rabbits, bats, rats, mice, pine martens and a subspecies of North African hedgehog.

== Municipalities ==
Municipal boundaries in Menorca

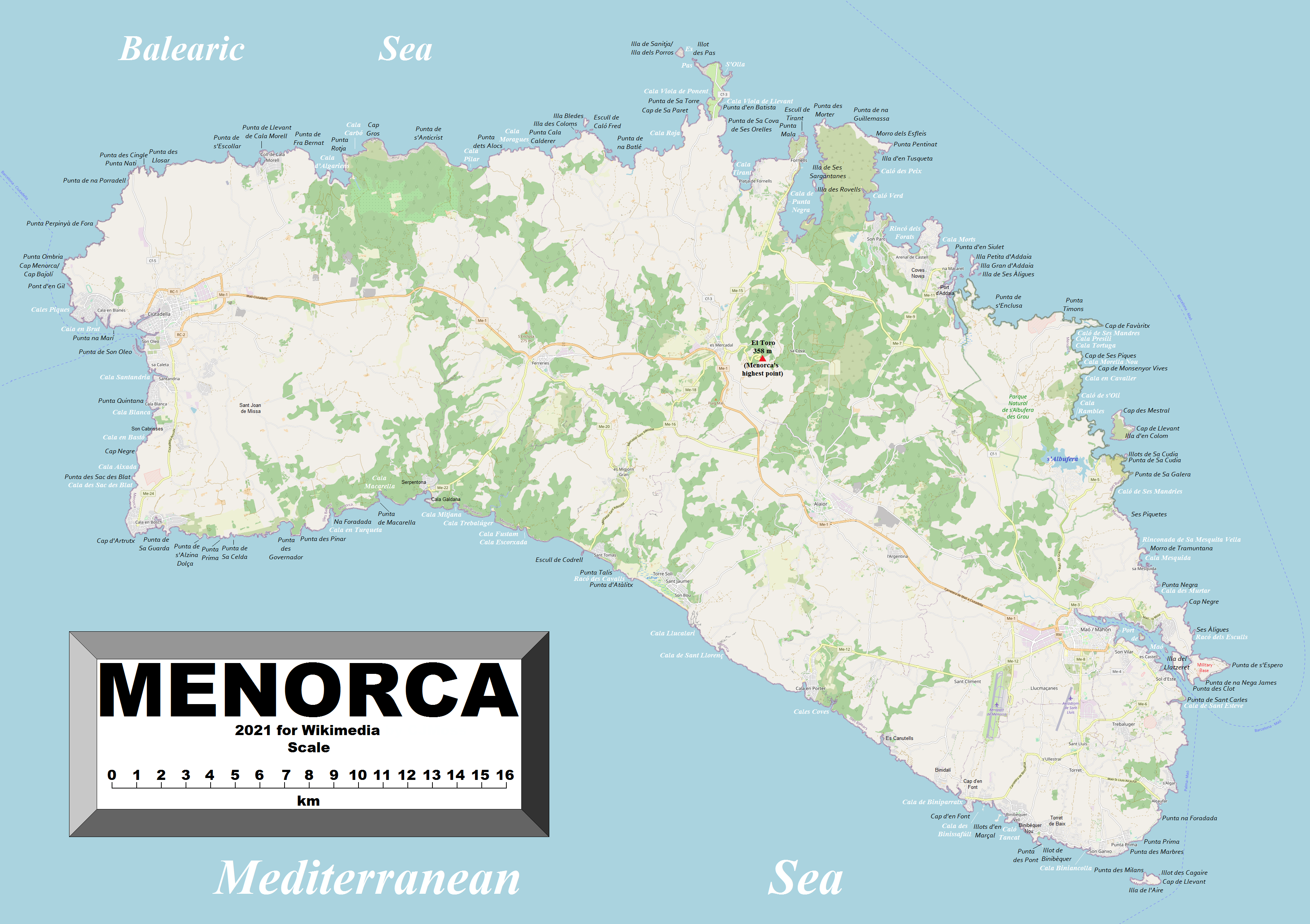
Enlargeable, detailed map of Menorca

The major towns are Mahón and Ciutadella de Menorca. The island is administratively divided into eight municipalities (from west to east):

- Ciutadella de Menorca (or just Ciutadella locally) – the ancient capital of Menorca until 1722.
- Ferreries
- Es Mercadal
  - Fornells, which belongs to the municipality of Es Mercadal. Famous for its lobster stew (caldereta).
- Es Migjorn Gran (or Es Mitjorn Gran) – hometown of supercentarian Joan Riudavets.
- Alaior
  - Cala En Porter – a tourist and residential area
- Mahón (Maó) – became the capital in 1722 during British rule due to its strategic natural harbour.
  - Llucmassanes – a small hamlet which belongs to the municipality of Mahón.
  - Sant Climent, which belongs to the municipality of Mahón.
- Es Castell – Founded by the British and originally named as Georgetown.
- Sant Lluís – Founded by the French and originally named Saint-Louis.

The areas and populations of the municipalities (according to the Instituto Nacional de Estadística, Spain) are:

Municipality	Area (km^{2})	Census Population 1 November 2001	Census Population 1 November 2011	Census Population 1 January 2021	Estimated Population 1 January 2023
Ciutadella de Menorca	186.3	23,103	29,510	30,766	31,669
Ferreries	66.1	4,048	4,667	4,903	5,056
Es Mercadal	138.3	3,089	5,292	5,474	5,927
Es Migjorn Gran	31.4	1,167	1,520	1,512	1,558
Alaior	109.9	7,108	9,450	9,686	9,879
Mahón	117.2	23,315	28,789	29,648	30,006
Es Castell	11.7	6,424	7,895	7,688	7,763
Sant Lluís	34.8	3,270	7,275	7,056	7,147
Totals	695.7	71,524	94,398	96,733	99,005

== Politics and government ==
=== Insular government ===
==== Results of the elections to the Island Council of Menorca ====
Elections are held every four years concurrently with local elections. From 1983 to 2007, councilors were indirectly elected from the results of the election to Parliament of the Balearic Islands for the constituency of Menorca. Since 2007, however, separate direct elections are held to elect the Council.

Island Councilors of the Island Council of Menorca since 1978
Key to parties PCE EUIB EU–EV Podemos United We Can–EUIB PSM PSM–EU PSM–PSI PSM–ENE PSM–EN MxMe PSIB–PSOE CIM CDS Cs UCD PP CD CP AP–PL Vox
Election	Distribution	President
1979	1 / 2 / 2 / 6 / 1	Francesc Tutzó Bennàsar (UCD)
1983	2 / 5 / 1 / 4	Tirs Pons (PSIB–PSOE)
1987	2 / 5 / 1 / 5	Tirs Pons (PSIB–PSOE)
1991	2 / 5 / 6	Albert Moragues (PSIB–PSOE) (1991)
1991	2 / 5 / 6	Joan Huguet (PP) (1991–1995)
1995	1 / 1 / 4 / 7	Joan Huguet (PP) (1995)
1995	1 / 1 / 4 / 7	Cristòfol Triay (PP) (1995–1999)
1999	1 / 1 / 5 / 6	Joana Barceló (PSIB–PSOE)
2003	1 / 6 / 6	Joana Barceló (PSIB–PSOE)
2007	1 / 6 / 6	Joana Barceló (PSIB–PSOE) (2007–2008)
2007	1 / 6 / 6	Marc Pons (PSIB–PSOE) (2008–2011)
2011	1 / 4 / 8	Santiago Tadeo (PP)
2015	2 / 3 / 3 / 5	Maite Salord (MpM) (2015–2017)
2015	2 / 3 / 3 / 5	Susana Mora Humbert (PSIB–PSOE) (2017–2019)
2019	1 / 3 / 4 / 1 / 4	Susana Mora Humbert (PSIB–PSOE)
2023	2 / 4 / 6 / 1	Adolfo Vilafranca (PP)

== Transport ==
Menorca has several roads that go around the island, the most important one being Me-1 road (Spain), which goes from the island's capital, Mahón, to Ciutadella. Menorca also has many bus lines, most of them only operated in the summer due to tourism. The most important line is line 01, which goes through Me-1 passing through all municipalities except Es Castell and Sant Lluís.

Menorca has one Airport, that serves to the whole Island.

== Gallery ==
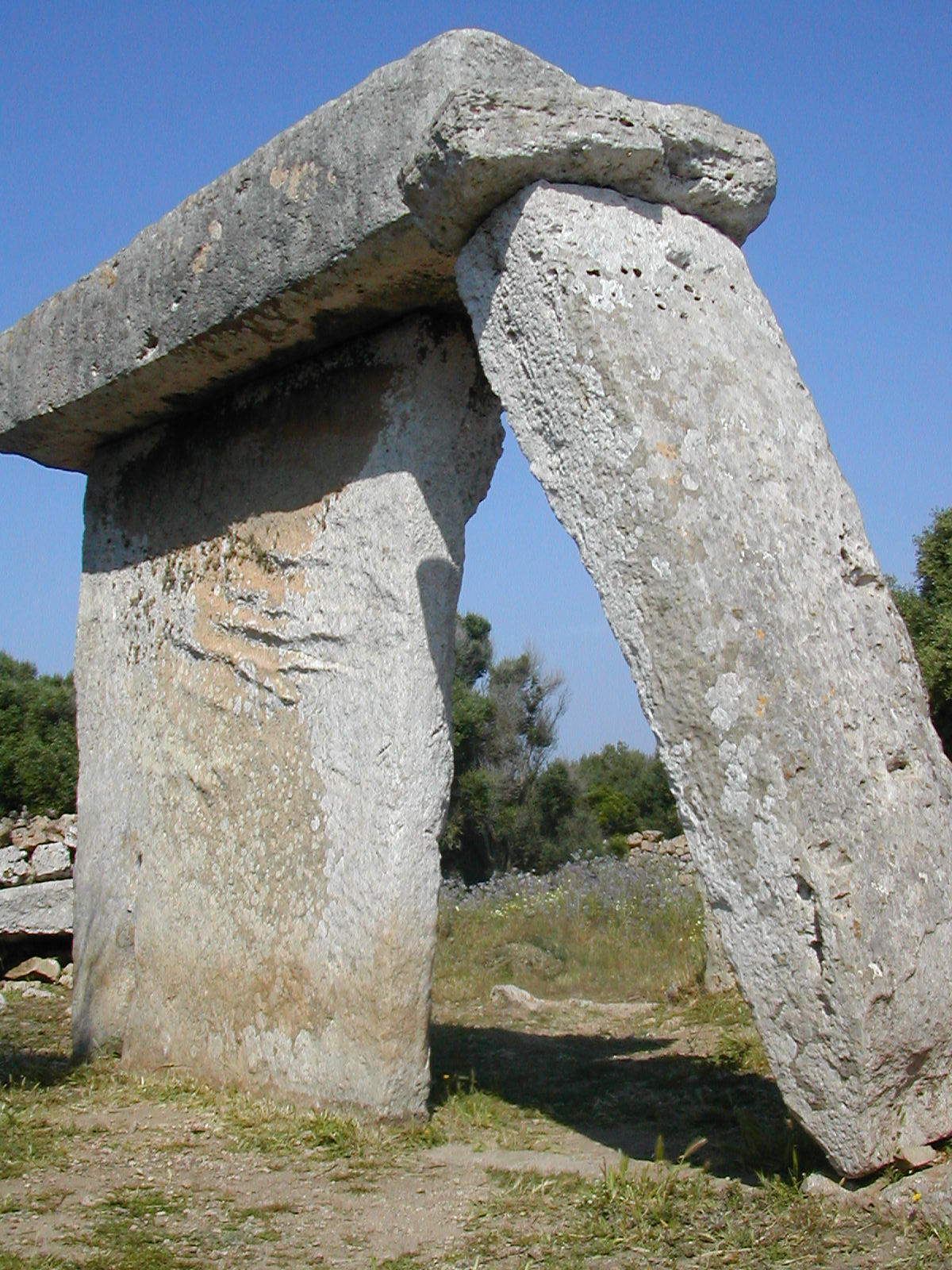
Taula from the site of Talatí de Dalt about 4 km (2 mi) west of Mahón.

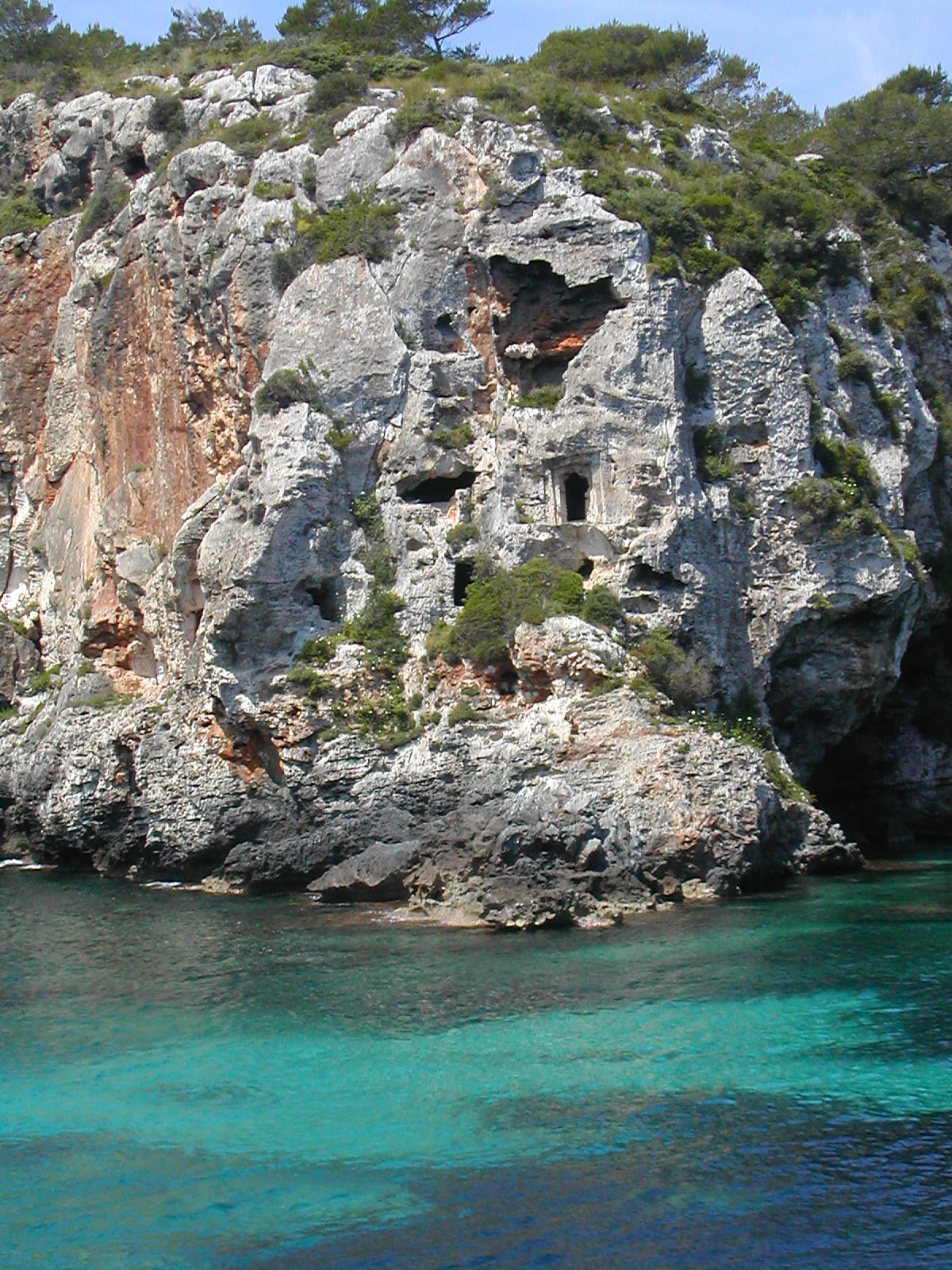
Cales Coves of Menorca. Note the hand-hewn entrances to the caves.

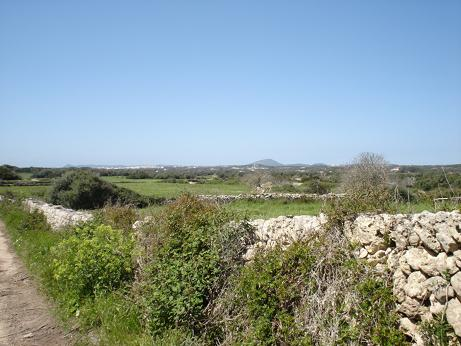
Menorcan countryside

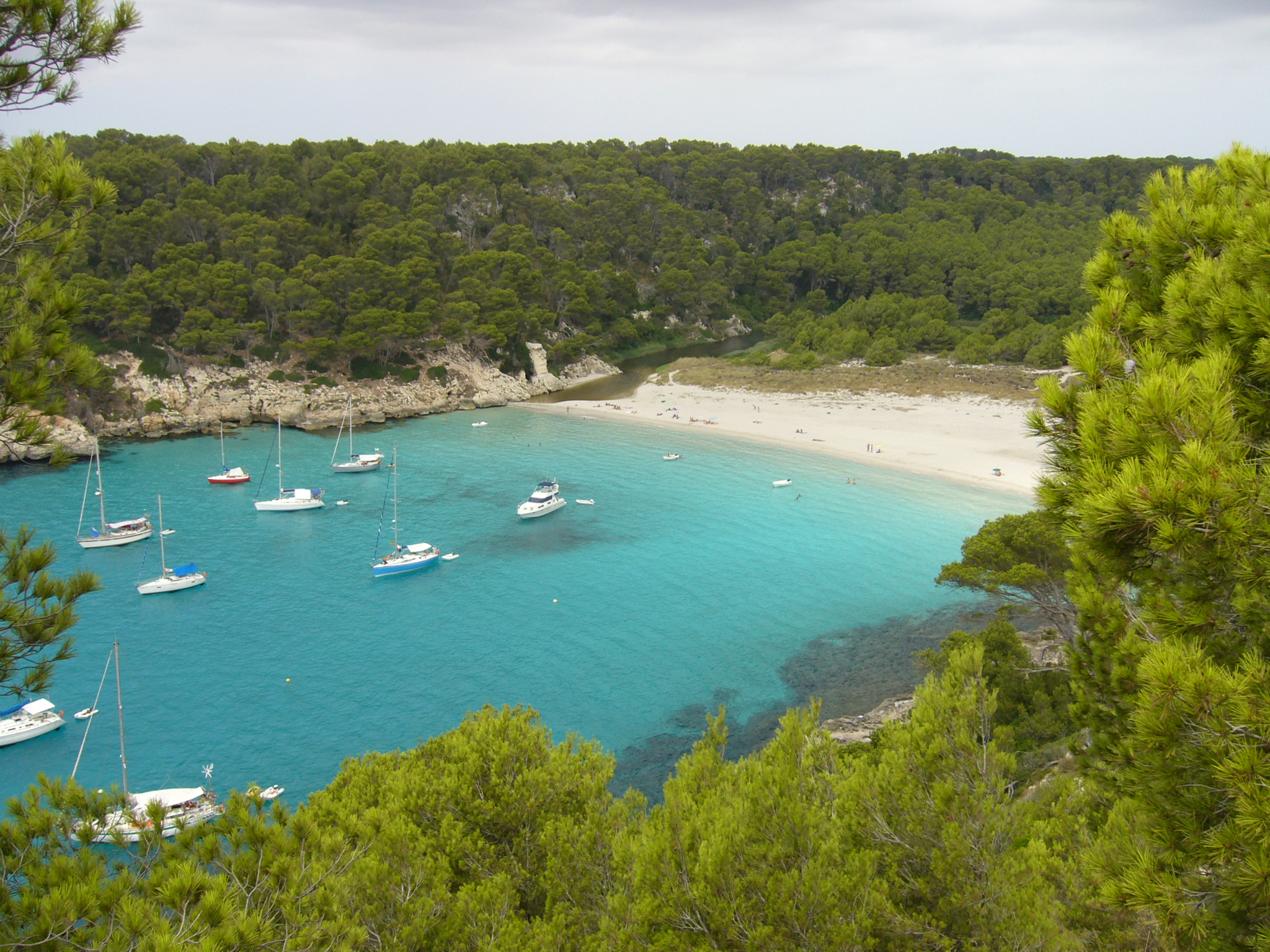
Cala Trebalúger

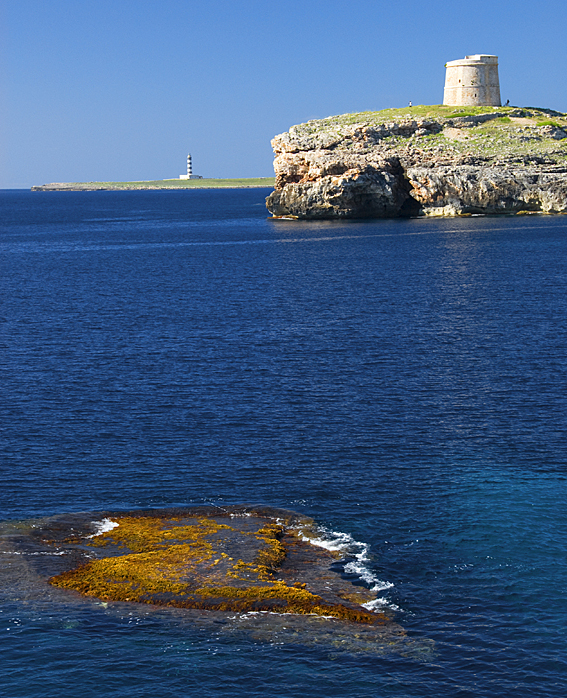
Martello tower, Alcaufar with Illa de l'aire lighthouse in the distance.

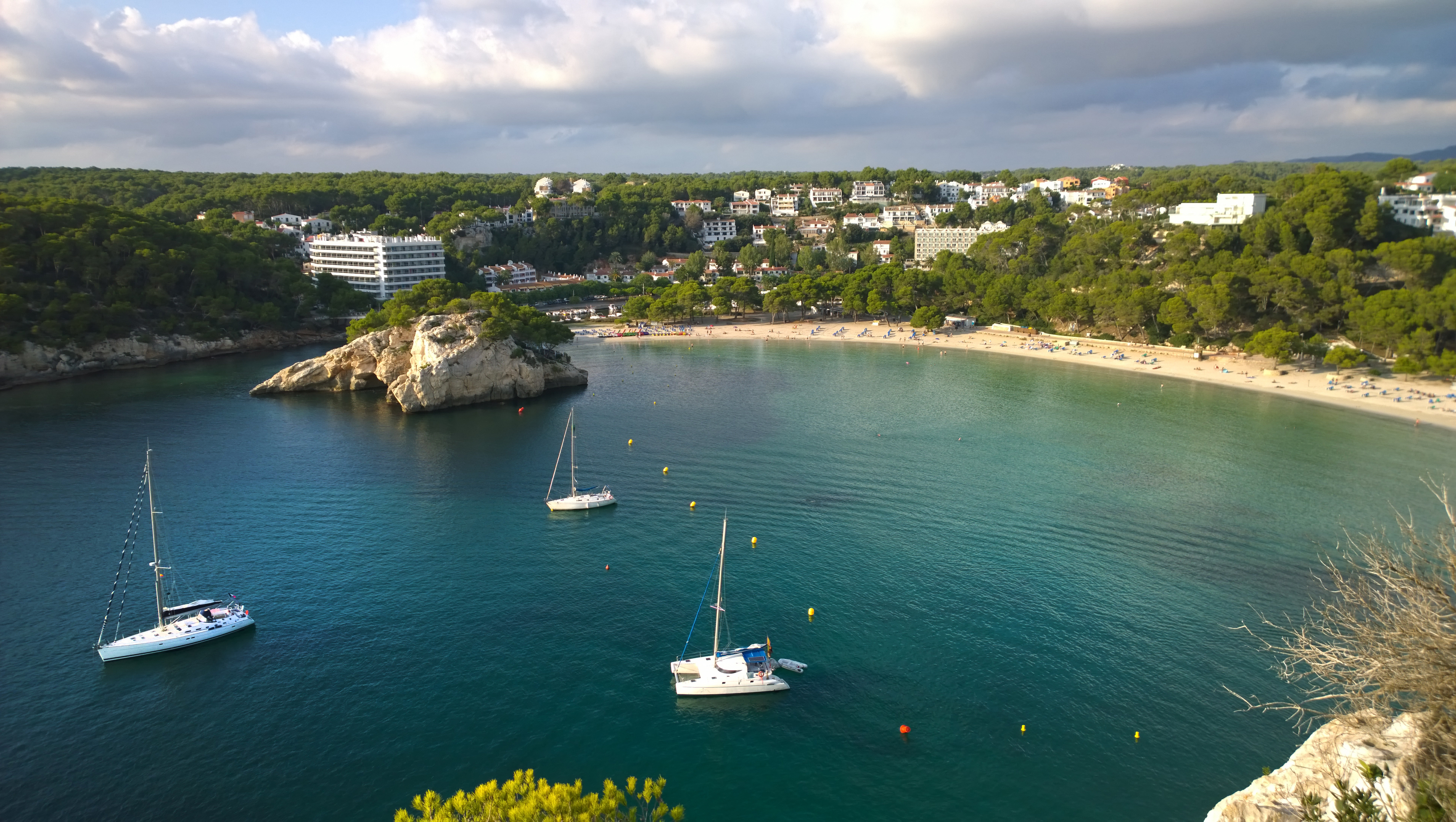
Cala Galdana

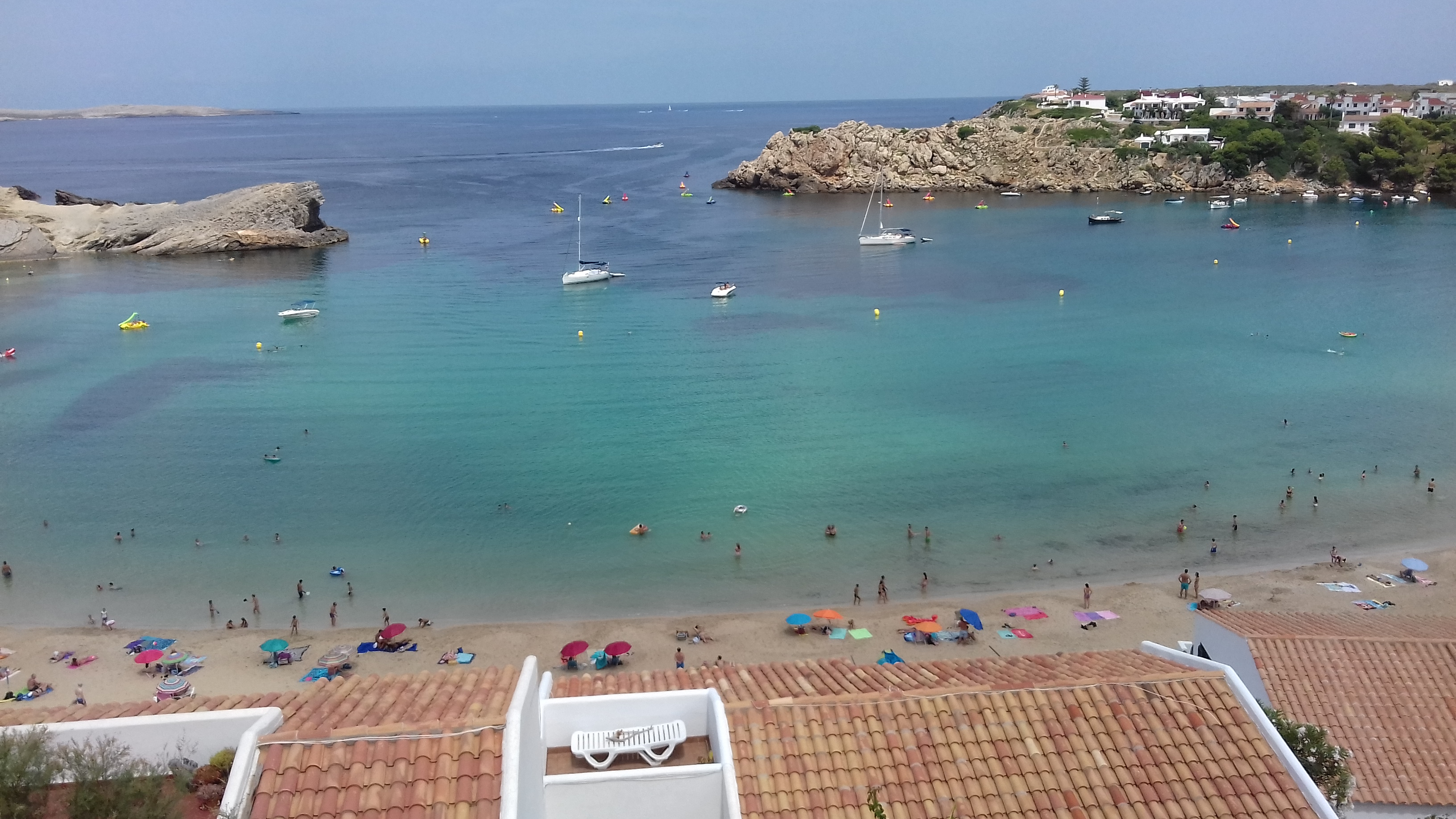
Arenal d'en Castell

== See also ==
- Gymnesian Islands
- Illa de l'Aire
- Instagram tourism
- List of butterflies of Menorca
- List of dragonflies of Menorca
- List of islets of Menorca
- Menorca Airport
- Menorca Sun
- Roman Catholic Diocese of Menorca
