= Sant Lluís =

- Municipality
- Flag Coat of arms

- Map of Sant Lluís in Menorca

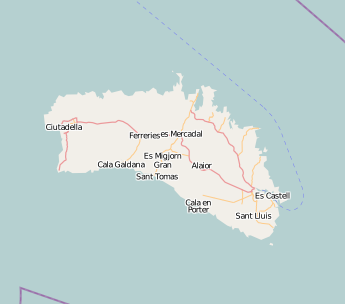
- Location in Menorca Sant Lluís (Balearic Islands) Sant Lluís (Spain)
- Coordinates: 39°50′58″N 4°15′29″E
- Country: Spain
- Autonomous Community: Balearic Islands
- Province: Balearic Islands
- Island: Menorca

Government
  - Mayor: Cristòfol Coll Alzina (PP)

Area
  - Total: 34.75 km^{2} (13.42 sq mi)
- Elevation (AMSL): 60 m (200 ft)

Population (2025-01-01)
  - Total: 7,312
  - Density: 210.4/km^{2} (545.0/sq mi)
- Time zone: UTC+1 (CET)
  - Summer (DST): UTC+2 (CEST (GMT +2))
- Postal code: 07710
- Area code: +34 (Spain) + 971 (Baleares)
- Website: Town Hall

Sant Lluís (Balearic Catalan: [ˈsaɲ ʎuˈis]; Spanish: San Luis) is a Spanish municipality on the tip of south-east Menorca in the Balearic Islands.

The main town is Sant Lluís, founded by the French in 1761 during their occupation of Menorca and dominated by Es Moli de Dalt, a fully restored, traditional windmill which is now a museum open to the public.

The area is noteworthy for its varied coastline, with fine sand beaches and cliffs, and the beautiful coves of Binissafúller, Biniancolla and Binibeca, with their typical whitewashed fishermen's houses. There are capes and islets, and medieval defensive towers all along the coast, very characteristic of the island.

== History ==
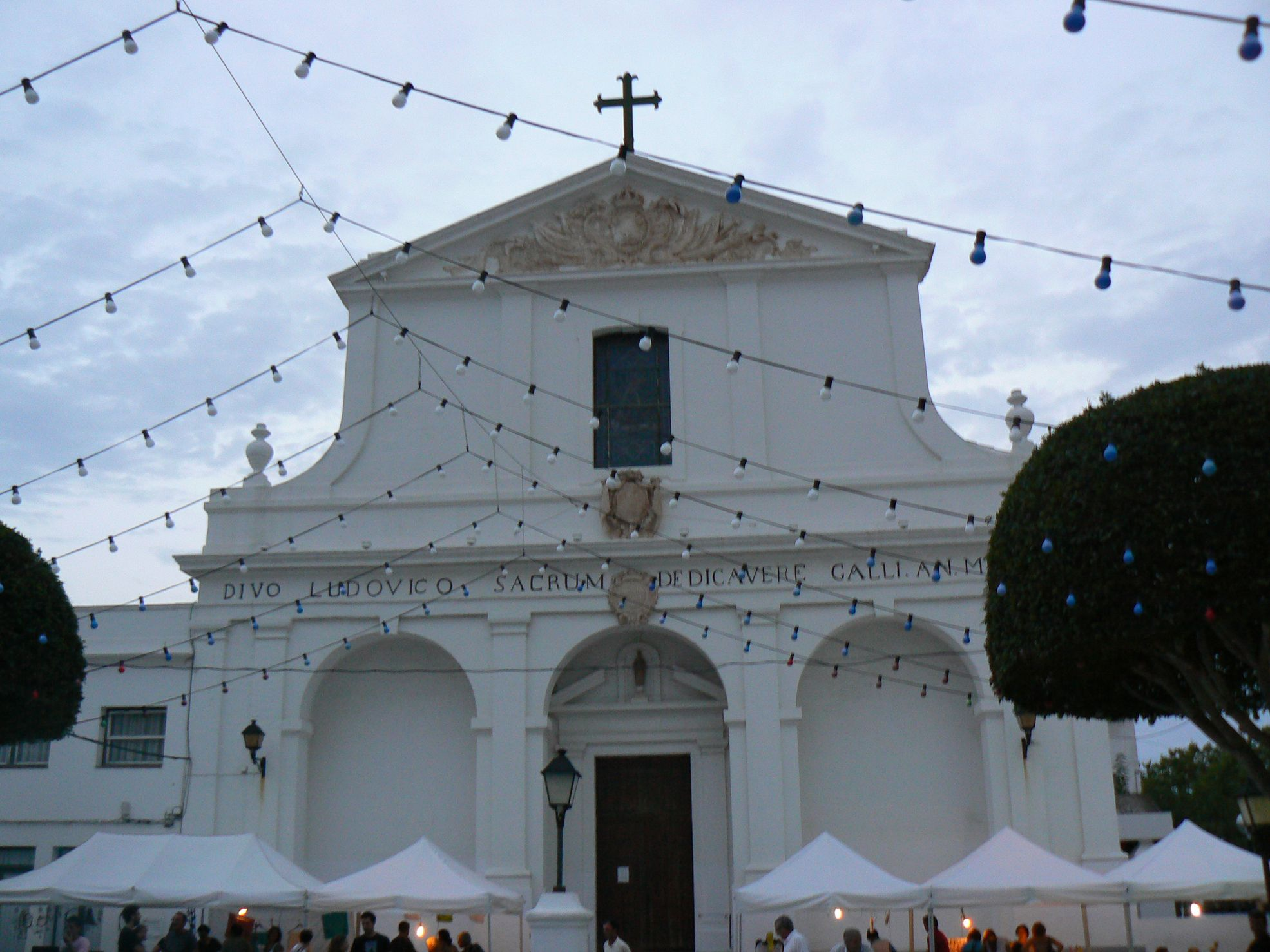
Church of Sant Lluís

Initially, French colonists built a large, whitewashed Neoclassical church, which they named after Louis IX. The town and municipality subsequently grew up around this church; local residents were drawn to the chapel for the protection and resources it offered. While the rest of the town was laid out by the French government in a grid-square system, a tree-lined town square in the form of a large public green space was established on land reserved opposite the church, today known as Pla de sa Creu (Spanish: Plaza del Caudillo).

Records surrounding the development of the town are sparse. Streets were named after government officials, religious figures, and prominent locals, but the exact uses for each street—and the reasoning behind their names—during the early settlement period are not well understood.

== Geography ==
Sant Lluis is a small municipality on the south-east coast of Menorca, named after its principal settlement, the inland town of Sant Lluis. The municipal borders extend right up northwards towards the outskirts of the capital Mahón and westwards towards the island's airport. The municipality borders the other municipalities of Mahón and Es Castell. Geographically, the region is fairly flat with rugged coastline, except for the major tourist resorts, where there are golden beaches; Playa de Punta Prima being one of the oldest resorts. The climate is typical to that of most of the Balearic Islands and Mediterranean Spain, a Mediterranean climate with cool winters and hot summers, and much of the Menorcan terrain is Mediterranean dry shrub land; home to many different species of herbs and shrubs.

The popular beach of Punta Prima is the first beach in Spain to greet sunrise, as Menorca is the most easterly part of Spain. Sant Lluis is home to several small prehistoric monuments, although not as numerous compared to the island's other municipalities, dating back to the prehistoric times.

=== Settlements ===
The major town in the municipality is Sant Lluis (Spanish: San Luís), which is where the area's name is derived from. The town's main street is called Es Cós in Balearic Catalan.

Many of the streets are laid out in a grid pattern of straight wide roads, characteristic of the town's French founders, as land was sold to settlers in gridded lots.

== Demographics ==
Like the rest of Spain, almost every native resident is able to speak Spanish, (sometimes referred to as Castilian). However, the majority of the population can also speak Catalan, which is spoken throughout Catalonia, Valencia, and the Balearic Islands, and even has its own dialect spoken on the island, menorquí, a variant of the Balearic dialect; widespread throughout the Balearics.

Many British expats choose to retire to Spain, so English is often spoken by retired residents and throughout the tourist resorts on the municipality's southern coast.

== Culture ==
The town celebrates its own festival, the Feast of St. Luis, at the end of August.

Trotting races have been very popular on the island for over 200 years. The Balearic Islands are the only part of Spain where this equestrian sport is practiced. Adjacent to the Aeroclub on the main Mahon to Sant Lluis road is the Hippodrome where trotting races are held every Saturday evening in summer and Sunday mornings in winter. Opposite the Hippodrome is Estadio Bintaufa, the former home ground of the now-defunct Club de Football Sporting Mahonés.

== Tourism ==
The municipality is a popular place for foreign visitors to spend their summer holidays. Well-established resorts such as Punta Prima and Binebeca on the south coast attract thousands of holidaymakers a year, which miles of golden sand and rocky jagged cliffs. The tourist resorts of Punta Prima, Binebeca, Alcafar and s'Algar are popular with holidaymakers from northern Europe although these places are fairly quiet compared to the more well-known resorts of Cala'n Bosch and Playa de Son Bou on the north western coast of the island and the Bay of Palma on neighboring Mallorca and the popular Costa del Sol and Costa Blanca on the coast of mainland Spain.
