= El Toro (Menorca) =

Tallest hill of the island of Menorca

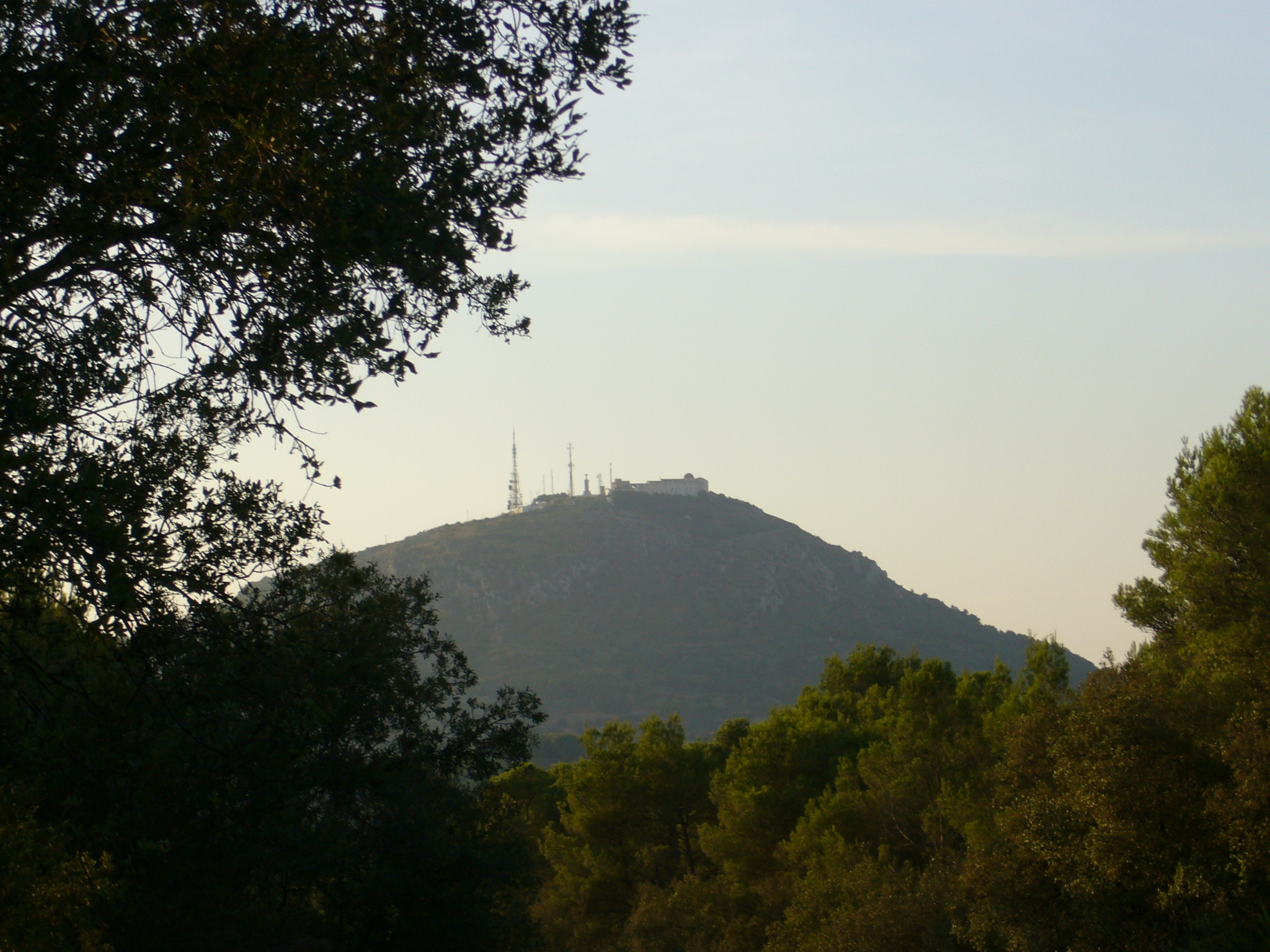
- View of El Toro from the Ben path in August 2006

Highest point
- Elevation: 358 m (1,175 ft)
- Prominence: 342 m (1,122 ft)
- Coordinates: 39°59′6″N 4°6′49″E

Geography
- Location: Menorca, Balearic Islands, Spain

El Toro in Catalan, sometimes known by its Spanish name of Monte Toro, is the tallest hill of the island of Menorca, rising to an elevation of 358 m (1,175 ft) above mean sea level. The mountain is home to the Sanctuary of the Verge del Toro. The mountain's summit can be reached by car or on foot, from which there is a fantastic view of almost the entire island and even the mountains of Mallorca on a clear day.

El Toro is designated as an ANEI (protected natural area).

== Etymology ==
The name "Toro" is an evolution, in part for the different languages and cultures that have passed in the island, of the Catalan (Menorquí) word "Turó", which means Hill. The name could also be derived from Arabic, coming from tor or al-tor which means 'height'. It does not come from, nor is it related to, the Spanish word for "bull".

== Location ==
Monte Toro rises above the surrounding farmland and foothills approximately 2 miles (3km) east from the central town of Es Mercadal, in the centre of the island. It can be seen from places throughout the island and is instantly recognisable, due to the fact it is Menorca's only prominent summit.

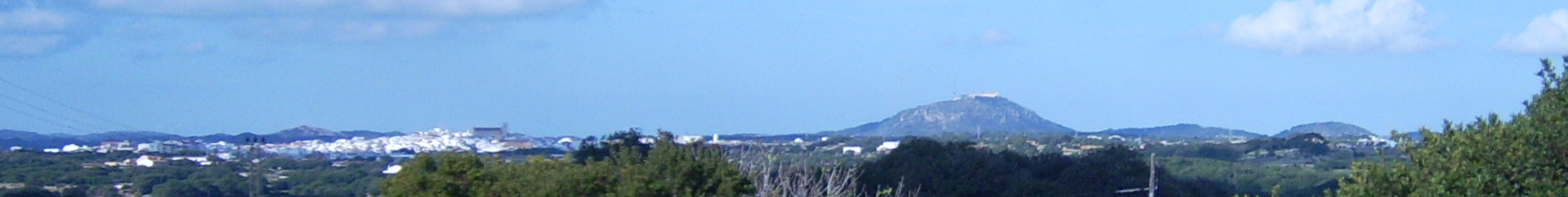
The view of El Toro and Alaior

== Features ==
On a clear day, the whole of the island is visible, especially the northern region from Ciutadella to Fornells and the mountains of Mallorca.

== Monuments of interest ==
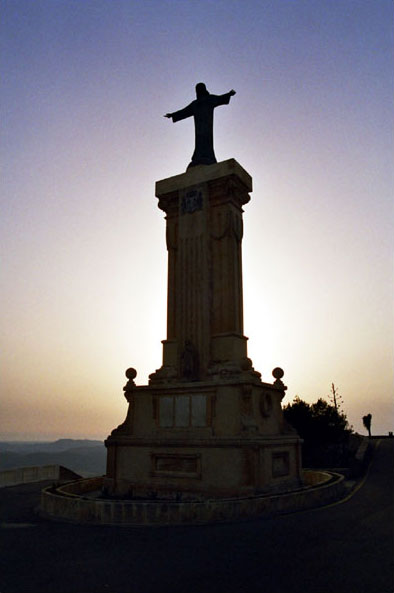
The summit of el Toro at Dusk

At its summit is the Sanctuary of the Virgen del Toro, an old Gothic church from 1670. There is also a statue of Christ, a gift shop, Match Digital's Spanish office and a restaurant with excellent views.
