= Cala Morell Settlement =

Archaeological site in Spain

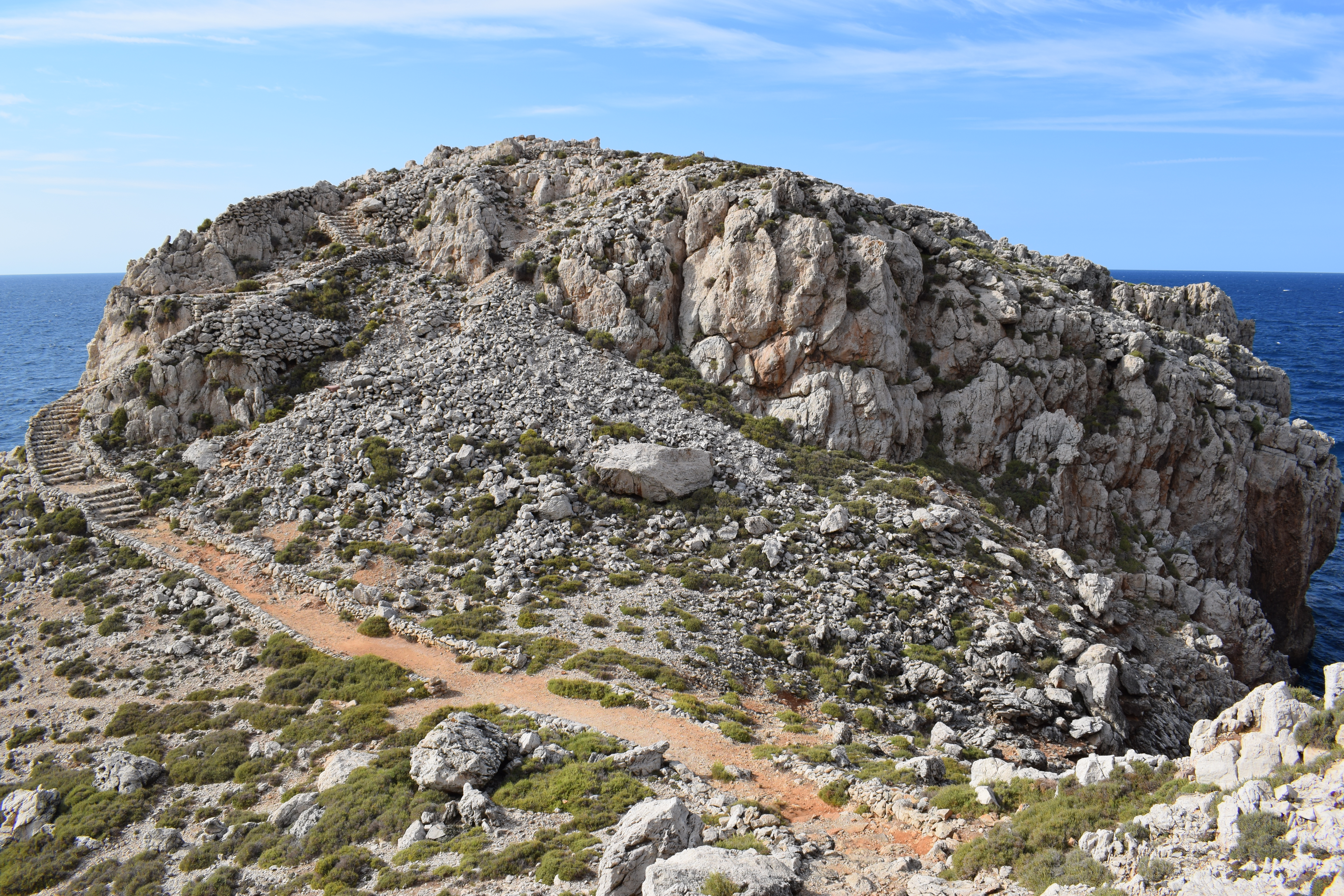
Cala Morell's coastal headland

The settlement of Cala Morell is a Menorcan pre-talayotic archaeological site which is located in Ciutadella de Menorca. It is situated on a 35-meter-high coastal headland which closes the northeast side of Cala Morell's bay. This promontory is protected by a dry-stone wall, which is found in the area where the promontory connects to solid ground. It shares many features with another site which is located some kilometers away from it: Es Castellet des Pop Mosquer.

It is one of the 32 Menorcan prehistoric sites that compose the series for the Talayotic Menorca nomination to become World Heritage by UNESCO.

== Characteristics ==
Around twelve dwelling navetas can be seen throughout the site, which are the Bronze Age dwellings that can be found in Menorca and Majorca. There is also an indeterminate 4-meter diameter circular structure built with large stone slabs which was put up on the promontory's highest part. There are two large hollows which were cut through the bedrock towards the settlement's central area, which could have been used to collect rainwater. All the structures within the settlement are enclosed by a dry-stone wall which closes access to the promontory from solid ground. In the side of the promontory which faces the sea there are no remains of defensive structures, since the rocks are high and sheer enough, forming a natural defence.

A planimetry was drawn by a research team from the Museum of Menorca in 1996. Nowadays a team of archaeologists in partnership with the Municipal Museum of Ciutadella and the History Museum of Manacor (Majorca) are conducting archaeological excavations in this site. This project, which is called "Entre Illes" (Between Islands) is in charge of carrying out archaeological research in two coastal headlands: Sa Ferradura (Porto Cristo, Mallorca) and Es coll de Cala Morell (Ciutadella, Menorca), following the same aims and methods in both sites

During the past few years two dwelling navetas (11 and 12) and the circular construction erected on the highest part of the settlement have been excavated. Both navetas are oriented to the south and are domestic units which abut the outer wall. Inside these navetas there are benches surrounding a hearth. There is a grinding stone base and a clay structure outside naveta 11 and facing its façade, and both elements are most likely related to food preparation (cereal grinding). Naveta 12 does not have this type of elements related to it, although it has two small stretches of wall that close its entrance.

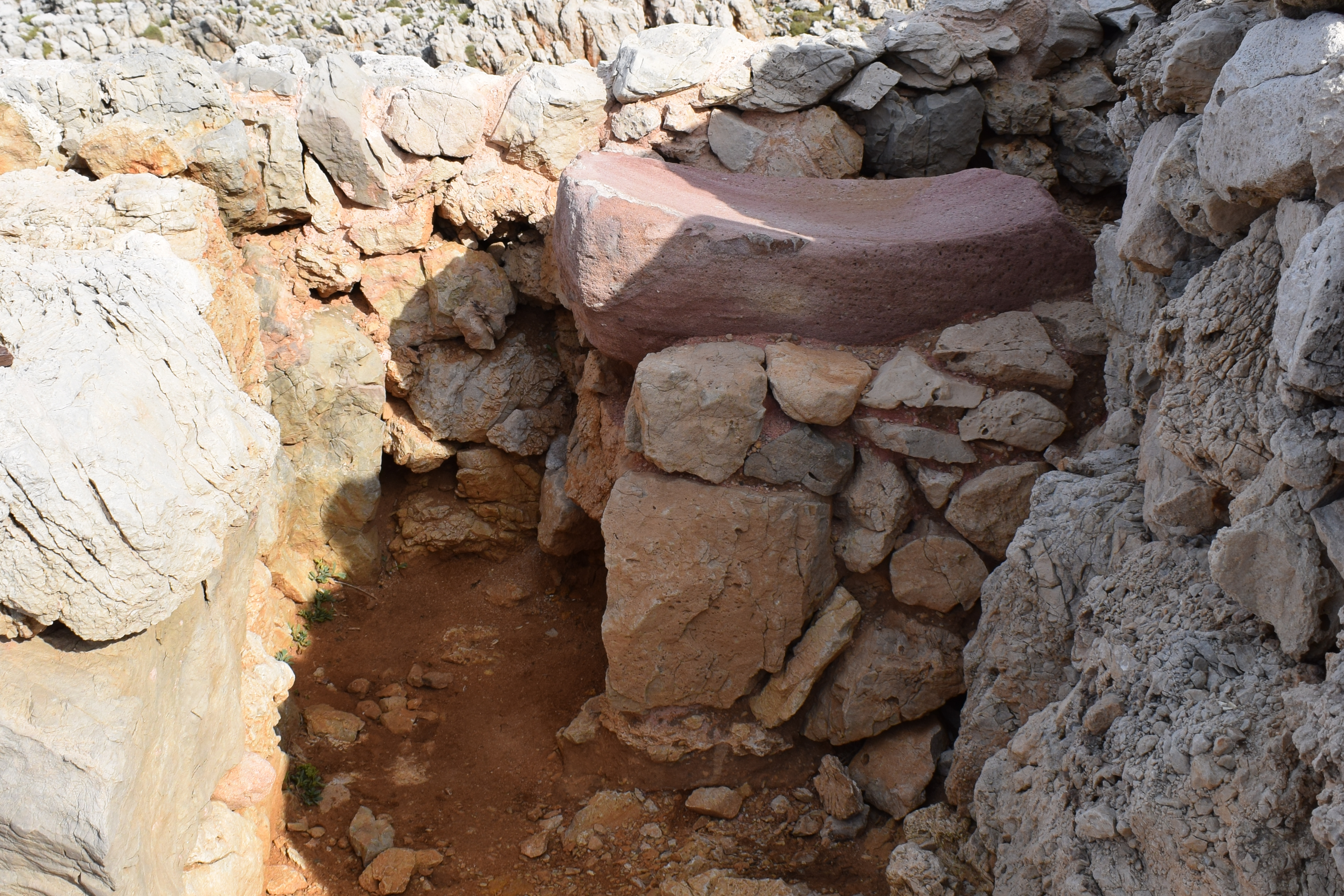
Base of grinding stone outside naveta 11

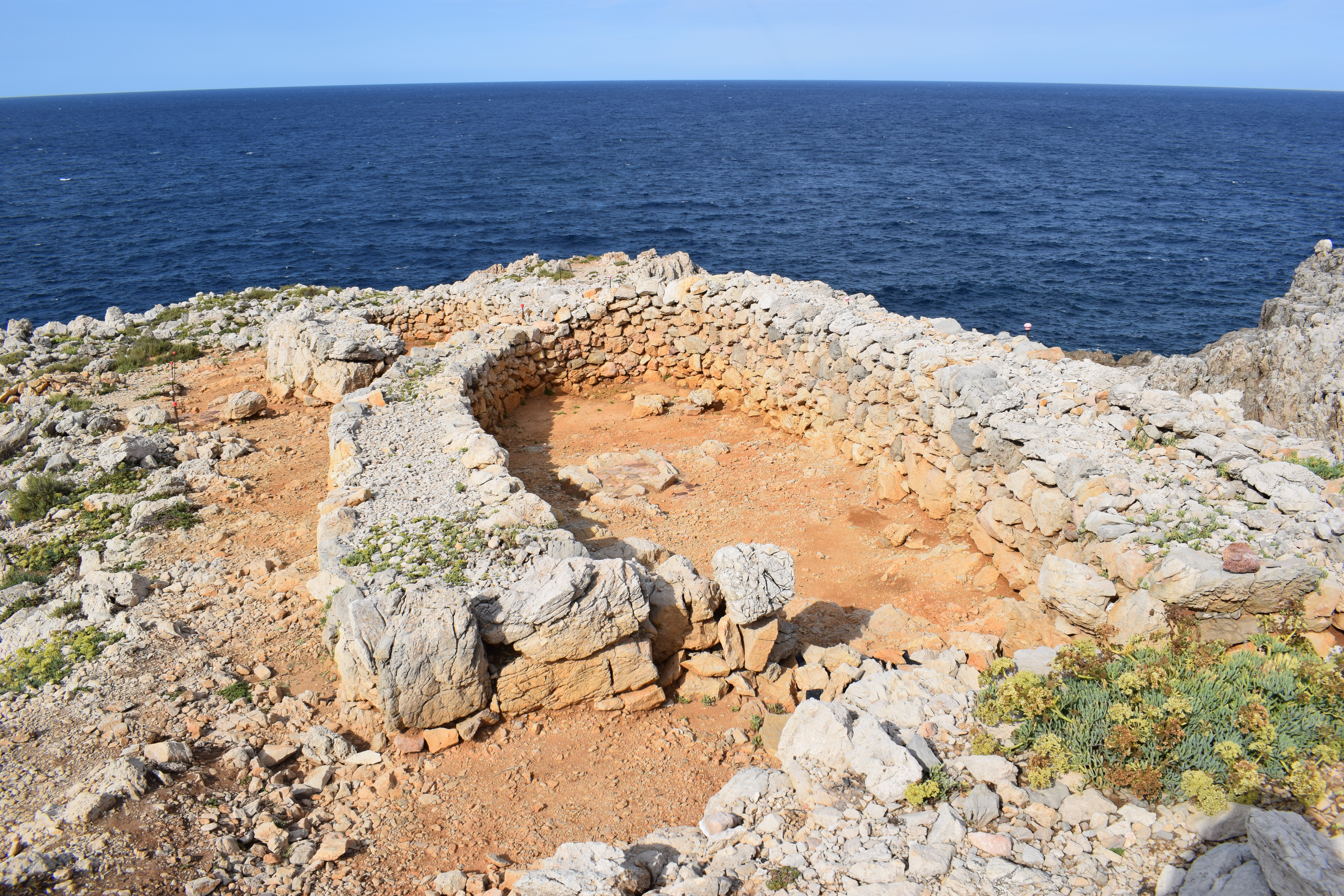
One of the navetas which have been excavated

All the evidence, including the structures, the recovered artifacts (pottery, bone tools such as awls and spatulas, grinding stones, etc.) and the huge quantity of domesticated animal bones (goats, sheep, pigs and, above all, cow) ) suggest that the function of these navetas was domestic. Moreover, the complete absence of marine animals (fish, mollusks, crustaceans, etc.) seems to indicate that the inhabitants of this place, despite living by the sea, did not consume or use marine resources. This fact, even though it can seem surprising, is something attested in all sites dating to the Prehistory of the island.

Radiocarbon dating of the site offers an approximate chronology of its occupation between 1600 and 1200 BC.

The researchers working at the site sustain the hypothesis of the settlement being located on a promontory due to defence needs caused by social conflict.

== See also ==
- Menorca
- Naviforme

== Bibliography ==
- Anglada, M.; Ferrer, A.; Salas, M. & Ramis, D. 2012. L’excavació arqueològica al cap costaner fortificat de cala Morell. Àmbit, 26

(URL: http://www.cime.es/WebEditor/Pagines/file/Ambit/Gener2012/Cala_Morell.pdf).

- Anglada, M.; Ferrer, A.; Ramis, D. & Salas, M. 2013. Una propuesta para la difusión y puesta en valor de yacimientos arqueológicos en Baleares: el proyecto "Entre Illes". In Castillo, A. (ed.), Proceedings of the First International Conference on Best Practices in World Heritage: Archaeology. Mahon, Minorca, Balearic Islands, Spain 9–13 April 2012. Madrid: Universidad Complutense de Madrid: 723–732.
- Anglada, M.; Ferrer, A.; Ramis, D. & Salas, M. 2013. El projecte “Entre Illes”: primers resultats als jaciments de sa Ferradura (Manacor) i cala Morell (Ciutadella). In VII Jornades d’Estudis Locals de Manacor. 11 i 12 de maig de 2012. Manacor: Ajuntament de Manacor: 113–124.
- Anglada, M.; Ferrer, A.; Ramis, D. & Salas, M. 2013. Resultats preliminars del projecte Entre Illes - el cas dels jaciments de sa Ferradura (Manacor) i Cala Morell (Ciutadella). In Riera, M. & Cardell, J. (coord.), V Jornades d’Arqueologia de les Illes Balears (Palma, 28 a 30 de setembre, 2012). Palma: Documenta Balear: 51–58.
- Anglada, M.; Ferrer, A.; Ramis, D. & Salas, M. 2015. Les llars de foc en els caps costaners de Sa Ferradura (Manacor) i Es coll de cala Morell (Ciutadella). In Andreu, C.; Ferrando, C. & Pons, O. (eds.), L’Entreteixit del Temps. Miscel·lània d’Estudis en Homenatge a Lluís Plantalamor Massanet. Palma: Conselleria de Participació, Transparència i Cultura del Govern de les Illes Balears: 59–72.
- JUAN, G. & PLANTALAMOR, L. 1996. L'aixecament planimètric del cap costaner de Cala'n Morell (Ciutadella-Menorca). Treballs del Museu de Menorca 15. Maó: Govern Balear, Conselleria d'Educació, Cultura i Esports.
- Plantalamor, L. (1991b): Los asentamientos costeros de la isla de Menorca. In AA.DD., Atti del II Congresso Internazionale di Studi Fenici e Punici, 9-14 Novembre 1987, Volume terzo, Roma: Consiglio Nazionale delle Ricerche: 1151–1160.
