= Biniai Nou hypogea =

Coordinates: 39.905751°N 4.212348°E

There are two funerary hypogea in Biniai Nou (Mahón), which were built in the Chalcolithic period (the oldest phase with human presence known so far for the island of Menorca). These hypogea have their chamber excavated into the rock, whereas the access or corridor was built with vertical stone slabs, which form a megalithic façade.

These two tombs were excavated several years ago by an archaeological team sponsored by the Museum of Menorca. These tasks shed light into their chronology and let the team recover objects that formed part of the grave goods that accompanied the dead: ceramic vessels, awls, radiolarite fragments (a type of rock that was used to make tools).

The tombs date from the Chalcolithic or Bronze Age. The importance of the Biniai Nou site lies on the fact that one of the human bones located in one of the hypogea was C14 dated and offered the oldest dating available in Menorca’s Prehistory (2290-2030 BC).

== Hypogeum 1 ==
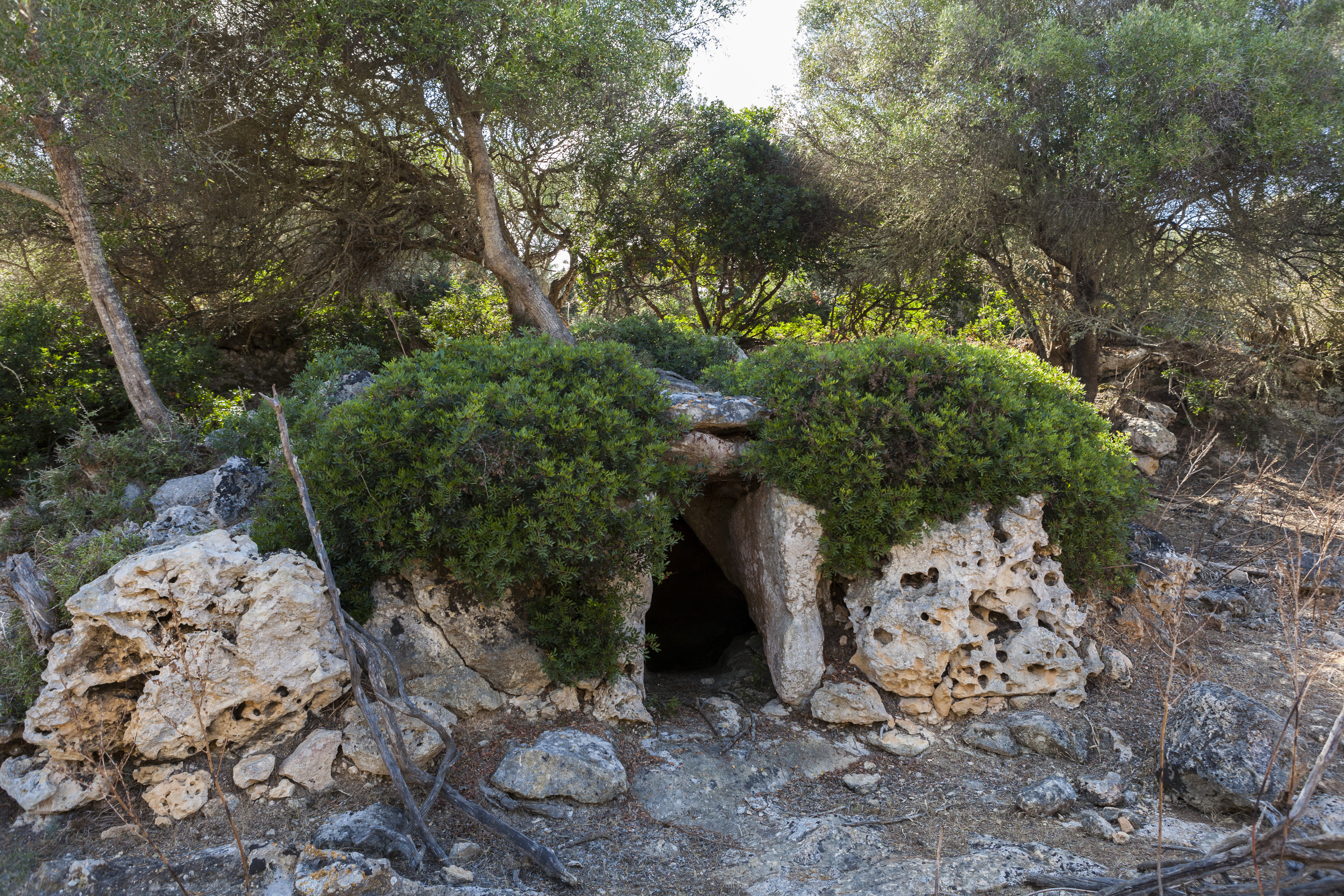
Biniai Nou's Hypogeum 1

Monument 1 has a slightly concave façade with an entrance towards its centre. This entrance leads to a corridor which is covered by a doubled-slab system. The chamber has an oval layout and a stone bench to the left.

There is a “capada de moro” or artificial depression cut through the rock 50 meters away from this hypogeum.

== Hypogeum 2 ==
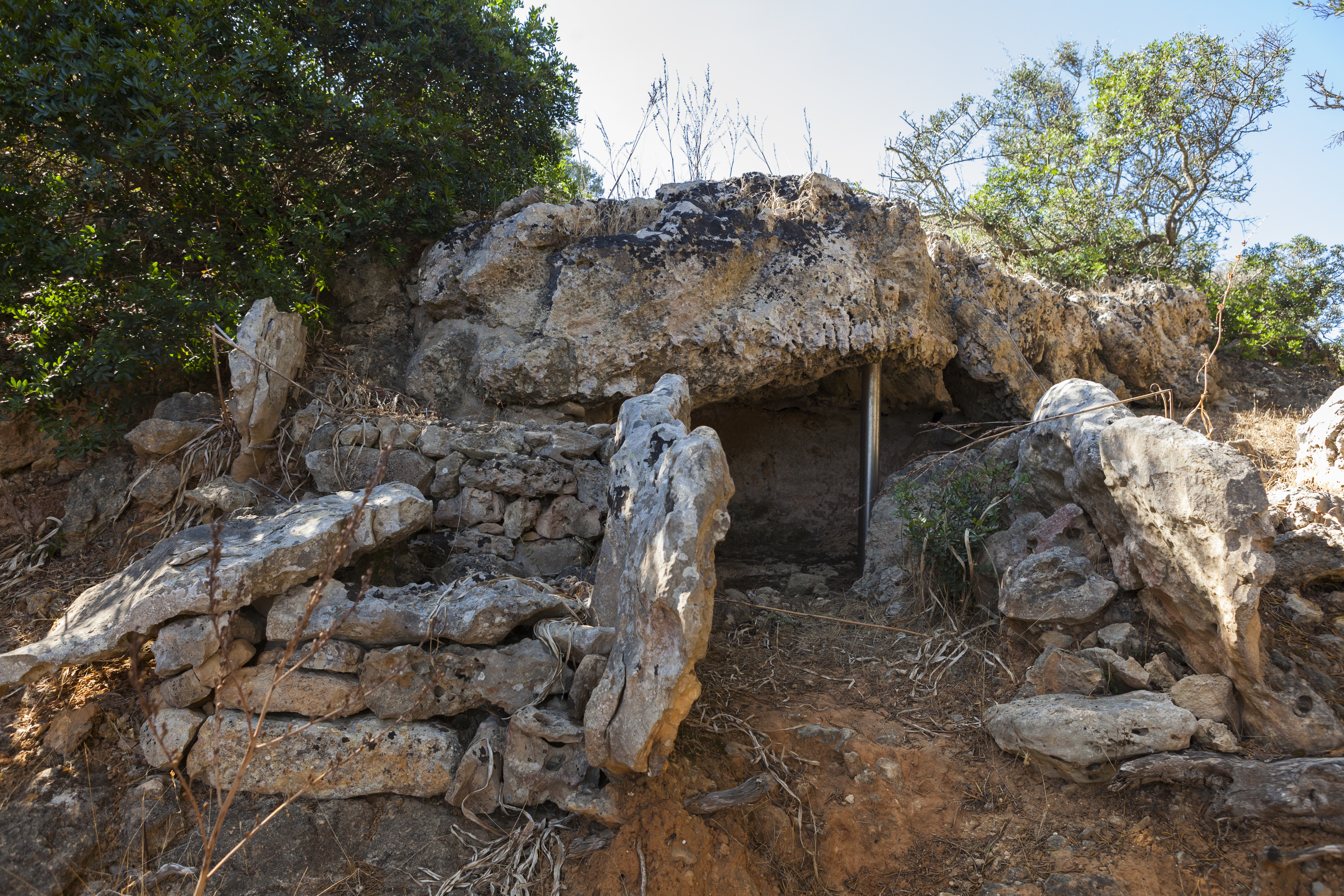
Biniai Nou's hypogeum 2

Monument 2 also has a slightly concave façade with a central entrance which leads to a short corridor. The chamber is circular and is deteriorated due to a roof collapse, which was restored after the excavation process. Archaeological tasks determined that 81 individuals in primary burials were placed inside this hypogeum. When the roof collapsed the hypogeum was in full use.

== Analysis ==
Even though Biniai Nou has offered the oldest evidence of human presence on the island (between 2300 and 2000 BC), it cannot be known for sure that this was the moment when the first settlers arrived, since they could have done so in earlier dates. Notwithstanding it seems that the first human beings who arrived to Menorca to stay on a permanent basis were already farmers and herders. These people carried animals inside their boats, which were bred on the island: goats, sheep, pigs and cows. The funerary traditions of these first communities included the construction of collective tombs of large slabs, which are known as dolmens or megalithic tombs. Some of them were completely built, such as the dolmen of Ses Roques Llises. Others, such as Biniai Nou, consisted in a chamber cut into the rock, whereas the entrance was built using the megalithic technique.

== See also ==
- Naveta
- Gymnesian Islands
