= Antigüedades célticas de la isla de Menorca =

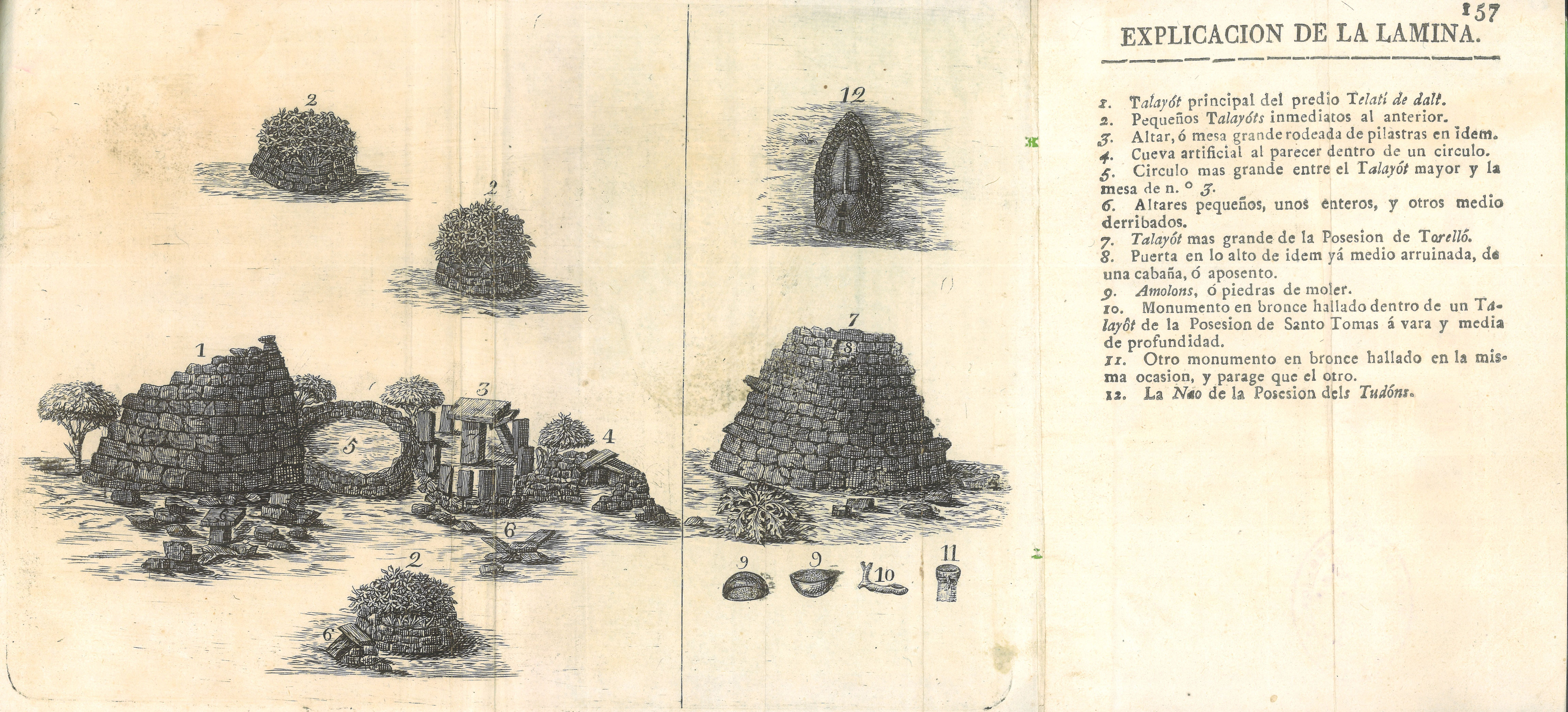
One of the plates included in the book, the plate lists the types of prehistoric monuments on the island, including names and drawings of each of them

Antigüedades célticas de la isla de Menorca ("Celtic Antiquities of the Island of Menorca") is a book written by the Menorcan scholar Juan Ramis y Ramis (1746–1819). It was published in Mahón in 1818 and is the first book/treatise wholly dedicated to prehistory in Spain.

== Background ==
Antigüedades célticas de la isla de Menorca was written during the last phase in the life of Juan Ramis y Ramis, who started writing it in 1814 and finished it with his death in 1819. Its main subject is Menorcan history, grouping together all what he covered in all the pieces of work that he published in the time, such as Alquerías de Menorca (1815), Varones Ilustres de Menorca (1816), La Alonsíada (1818) and the posthumous Historia civil y política de [Menorca] (1819).

During this phase in the life of Ramis, Menorca was under the rule of the Spanish monarchy, after it was under British rule in three different periods and also under French rule once over the 18th century. For this reason, Ramis, who used Catalan as a lingua franca in most of his works, wrote in Spanish this time. His main aim was to make the singular character of Menorca known to the rest of Spain through its history.

== The book ==
The book, which deals with the prehistory of Menorca, was first thought to cover more topics and be divided into three volumes devoted to the civil and political history of the island. Only the first volume was published since the author died a year later.

Ramis’ book is arranged in an introduction and ten chapters, in which the author delves into the knowledge about Menorcan prehistory following the style in vogue in 18th century Europe, considering that the megalithic constructions of Europe were thought to be Celtic.

In the different chapters the author makes a typological classification of the monuments (following the nomenclature that has come down to us: talayot, taula enclosure, naveta...) and offers some interpretations that are not accepted any longer–due to better knowledge about the Talayotic culture, thanks to the archaeological excavations carried out in many sites during the 20th century. For instance, he believes the Celts built most of the monuments and that the vast majority of the (Talayotic) buildings had a religious function.

Ramis based his writings on the antiquarian tradition in such a way that he tries to explain the archaeological remains through written records. However, he overcame this limitation since he also used different types of archaeological objects and structures to obtain information from the past. He expressed his hypothesis about the irregular distribution of prehistoric settlements on the island, correctly pointing to the environmental conditions defined by types of soil. It is also important to remark the thorough list of prehistoric sites included in the book. Of the 350 talayots which are currently recorded, he mentions 195. Thus, this Menorcan erudite was not only a desk-based researcher.

Despite the Enlightenment spirit that can be felt throughout his work, we still find approaches which are typical from previous periods, making reference, for instance, to the biblical roots of the first settlers as well as to writings from several authors who considered that the origins of the Iberians and the Celts were found in Tubal and Tarsis. It was not until the end of the 19th century, when Émile Cartailhac published his book Monuments Primitifs des Iles Baleares (Primitive monuments of the Balearic Islands), when a proper scientific study started to develop towards the prehistoric monuments of Menorca. Unlike Ramis’ book, published in 1818, Cartailhac's was published in 1892, nearly 30 years after archaeology started to be internationally regarded as a proper scientific discipline.

Ramis was the first author who talked about the naveta d'Es Tudons, although his ignorance towards its nature led him to think it was a temple dedicated to goddess Isis. The archaeological excavation conducted by Maria Lluïsa Serra Belabre and Lluís Pericot in the second half of the 20th century shed light on its true function, being a collective tomb.

A modern approach in his work is his defense of the historical heritage. This attitude is perfectly expressed in his indignation towards the partial destruction of some grinding stones located in a prehistoric site, which happened some years before his book was published.

== Book structure ==
Prologue

Introduction

Chapter. I Which families or peoples preceded others in populating Menorca?

Chapter. II That the Celts from France, from the British Isles and from other places in Europe built several buildings similar to those in Menorca

Chapter. III When they started to build talayots on the island: tools and means that were used to do this and what these constructions were destined to be

Chapter. IV About circles and pilasters that can be seen near the talayots

Chapter. V About the large and small taulas or altars

Chapter. VI About the amolons or grinding stones that are found near the talayots and circles in Menorca and about the two mill wheels that can be seen at the top of the Torelló talayot

Chapter. VII About the artificial caves that can be seen around the talayots in Menorca

Chapter. VIII About the ship-shaped building in Es Tudons, in Ciutadella judicial district

Chapter. IX Several features of the druids

Chapter. X Conjectures about the two ancient monuments recently found on the island

Watchtowers on the island of Menorca, locally known as talayots

== See also ==
- Talaiotic culture
- Juan Ramis

== Bibliography ==
- BAGUR, J.; SALORD, J.; & VILLEYRA, A. 1998. Joan Ramis, un il·lustrat de la Menorca disputada. Mahón: IES Joan Ramis i Ramis. Consejería de Educación, Cultura y Deportes.
- PONS, B. (ed.). 2018. Antigüedades célticas de la isla de Menorca, by Joan Ramis i Ramis (1818). Menorca: Institut Menorquí d'Estudis, Consell Insular de Menorca.
- SALORD, J. 2011. La il·lustració a Menorca. Palma. Documenta.
