= Naveta d'Es Tudons =

Burial site in Ciutadella, Spain

Naveta of Es Tudons
- Naveta d'Es Tudons
- Naveta des Tudons
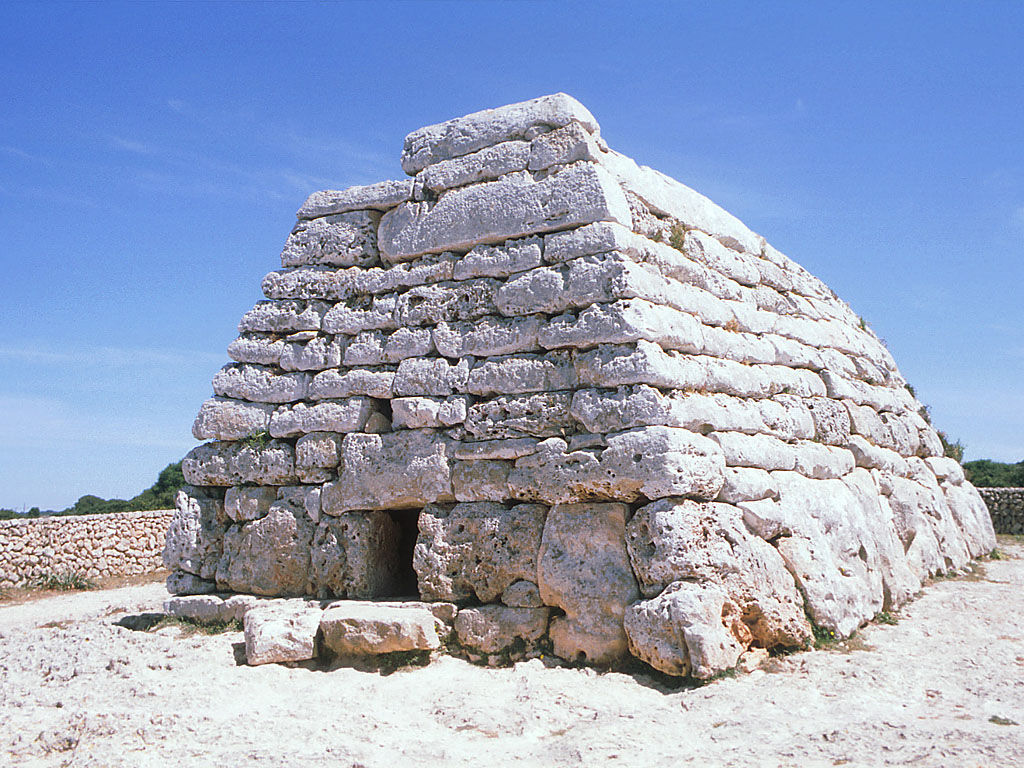
- Façade and side wall of the Naveta d'Es Tudons

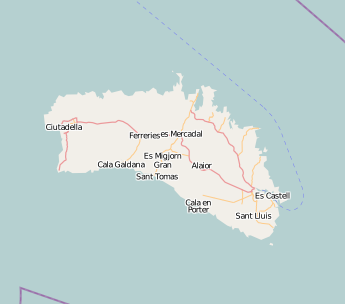
- Location within Minorca
- 40°00′11″N 3°53′30″E
- Type: Burial site
- Cultures: pre-Talaiotic age
- Location: Menorca, Balearic Islands, Spain

History
- Built: 2000–1000 BC
- Abandoned: 750 BC

Site notes
- Material: limestone
- Height: 4.50 metres (14.8 ft)
- Length: 13.60 metres (44.6 ft)
- Width: 6.40 metres (21.0 ft)
- Excavation dates: 1959
- Condition: restored
- Public access: yes

The Naveta d'Es Tudons, or Naveta of Es Tudons (in Menorquí, naveta, or naueta, a diminutive form of nau, means nave, and Es Tudons, lit. the woodpigeons, is the name of the place), is the most remarkable megalithic chamber tomb in the Balearic island of Menorca, Spain.

It is located in the Western part of the island, on the Ciutadella de Menorca-Mahón road, approximately 3 miles out from Ciutadella, and 200 m south of the road. It stands on slightly rising ground in a sloping valley. Currently the Naveta d'Es Tudons is open to the public for visits (except for its interior as a measure of protection). It is one of the main tourist attractions of Menorca.

== History ==
In Menorca and Majorca there are several dozen habitational and funerary naveta complexes, some of which similarly comprise two storeys. Navetas (navetes in Menorquí) are chronologically pre-Talaiotic (i.e. prior to the Talaiotic age) constructions. Navetas were described in the early 19th century but not excavated until the 20th, notably during the 1960s and 1970s. Navetas were first given their name by the rather imaginative Dr Juan Ramis in his book Celtic antiques on the island of Menorca (1818), from their resemblance to upturned boats.

The Naveta d'Es Tudons is the largest and best preserved funerary naveta in Menorca. The Naveta d'Es Tudons served as collective ossuary between 1200 and 750 BC. The lower chamber was for stashing the disarticulated bones of the dead after the flesh had been removed while the upper chamber was probably used for the drying of recently placed corpses. Radiocarbon dating of the bones found in the different funerary navetas in Menorca indicate a usage period between about 1130–820 BC, but the navetas like the Naveta d'Es Tudons are probably older. Pre-Talaiotic constructions are dated using an uncalibrated radiocarbon chronology from 1640 to 1400 BC. The navetas used for communal burial rituals are dated to the late second millennium and early first millennium BC.

Although listed in the Spanish heritage register on 3 June 1931 (RI-51-0003442), the naveta d'Es Tudons was excavated and restored by archaeologist Lluís Pericot García in 1959–1960. It was found to contain the remains of at least 100 skeletons (one with trepanned skull). Various recovered objects like bronze bracelets or bone and ceramic buttons are today on display in the Museu de Menorca in Mahón. Restoration works were carried out and the two or three missing courses at the top were put back in place. For protection, it was surrounded at a distance by a recently restored modern dry stone field wall.

== Architecture ==
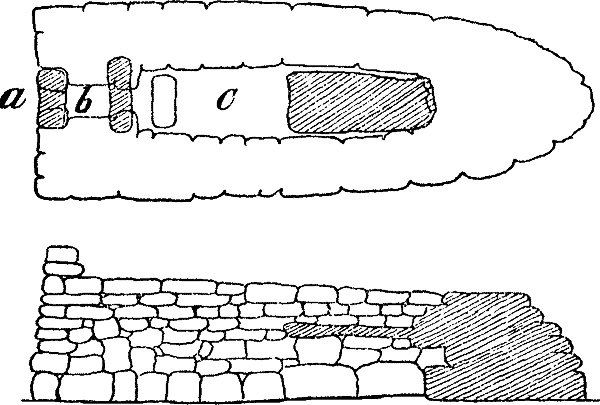
Plan and section of the unrestored naveta (1912): (a) low door, (b) narrow slab-roofed passage, (c) long rectangular chamber.

The shape of the Naveta d'Es Tudons is that of a boat upside down, with the stern as its trapezoidal façade and the bow as its rounded apse. Its groundplan is an elongated semicircle. Externally, the edifice is 14.5 m long by 6.5 m wide and 4.55 m high but it would originally have been 6 m high. It is orientated SWS/ENE, the entrance being at the SWS, in the centre of the slightly slanted (or battered) façade.

The front, side walls and apse of the edifice consist of successive horizontal corbelled courses of huge rectangular or square limestone blocks dressed with a hammer and fitted together without mortar, with an all-round foundation course of blocks of even greater size laid on edge.

The narrow, low entrance doorway (0.57 m x 0.75 m) is rebated to receive a closing slab. The once sealed-off entrance leads by a short, flag-roofed passage to an antechamber 1.3 m long and then another short passage to the main or lower chamber (7.45 m x 2.45 m), the ceiling of which is made of giant horizontal slabs inserted into the side walls, with an average span of 1.5 m c. 2.25 m above the floor. Above this is an upper chamber which is accessible from the upper part of the antechamber. It is slightly shorter (7.10 m) and narrower (1.90 m) than the lower chamber, with a similar although much lower (0.85 m) ceiling of horizontal slabs. These have holes in them, presumably for ventilation.

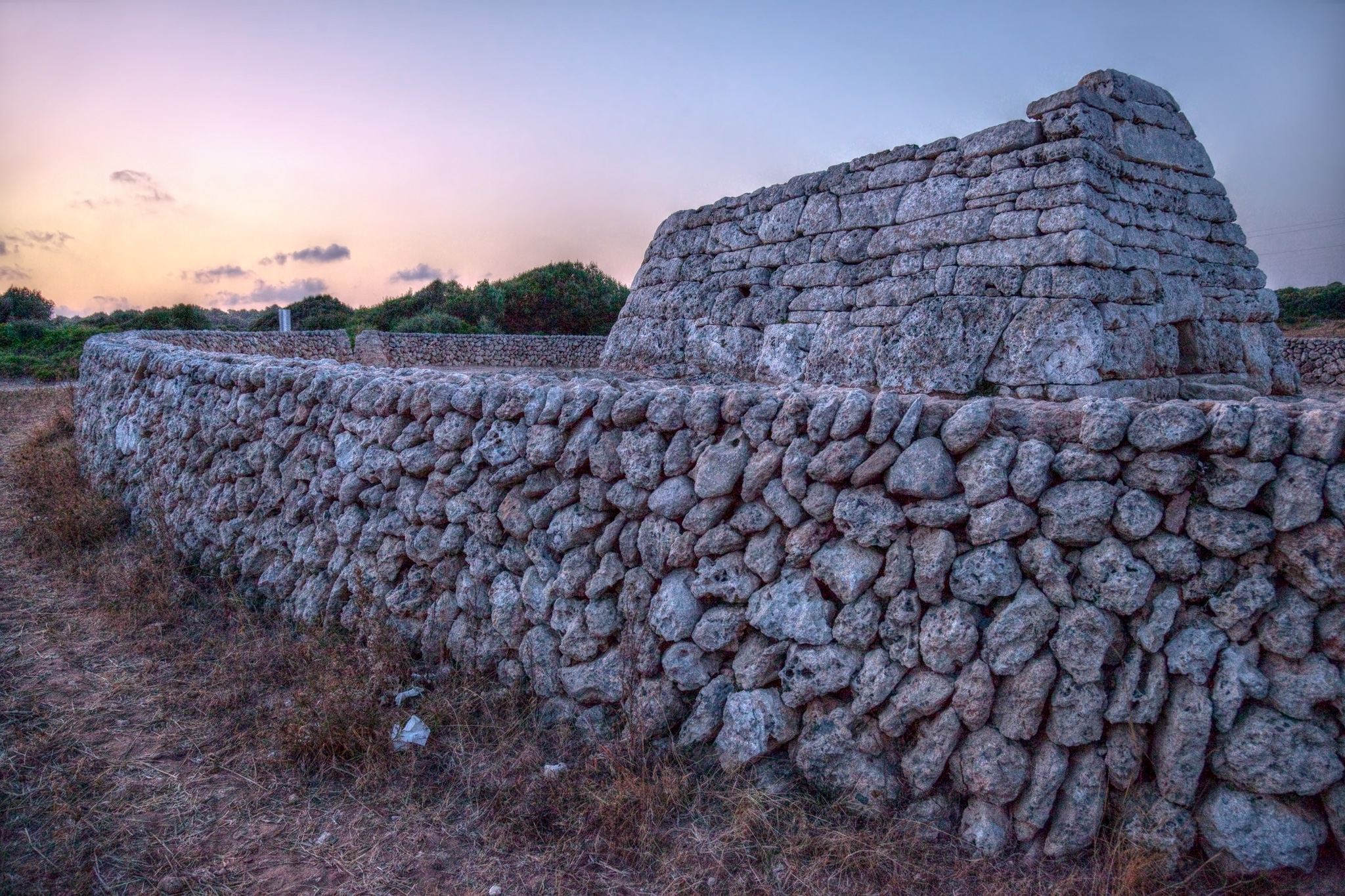
The edifice at dawn, behind its modern wall

== Folklore ==
According to Phil Lee, the author of The Rough Guide to Menorca, folkloric memories of the navetas' original purpose may have survived into modern times, for the Menorcans were loath to go near these odd-looking and solitary monuments until well into the 19th century.

A modern tragic lore tells that two giants were competing for the love of a girl. They agreed that one would build a naveta and the other would dig a water well and the first to finish would marry the girl. As the giant who was building the naveta was about to lay the last stone, the other struck water. Mad with jealousy, the first giant threw the last stone (the one that is missing from the top of the façade) into the well, killing the other giant. Then, feeling remorse, he killed himself. It is said that the girl died a spinster and was buried in the naveta.

== Gallery ==
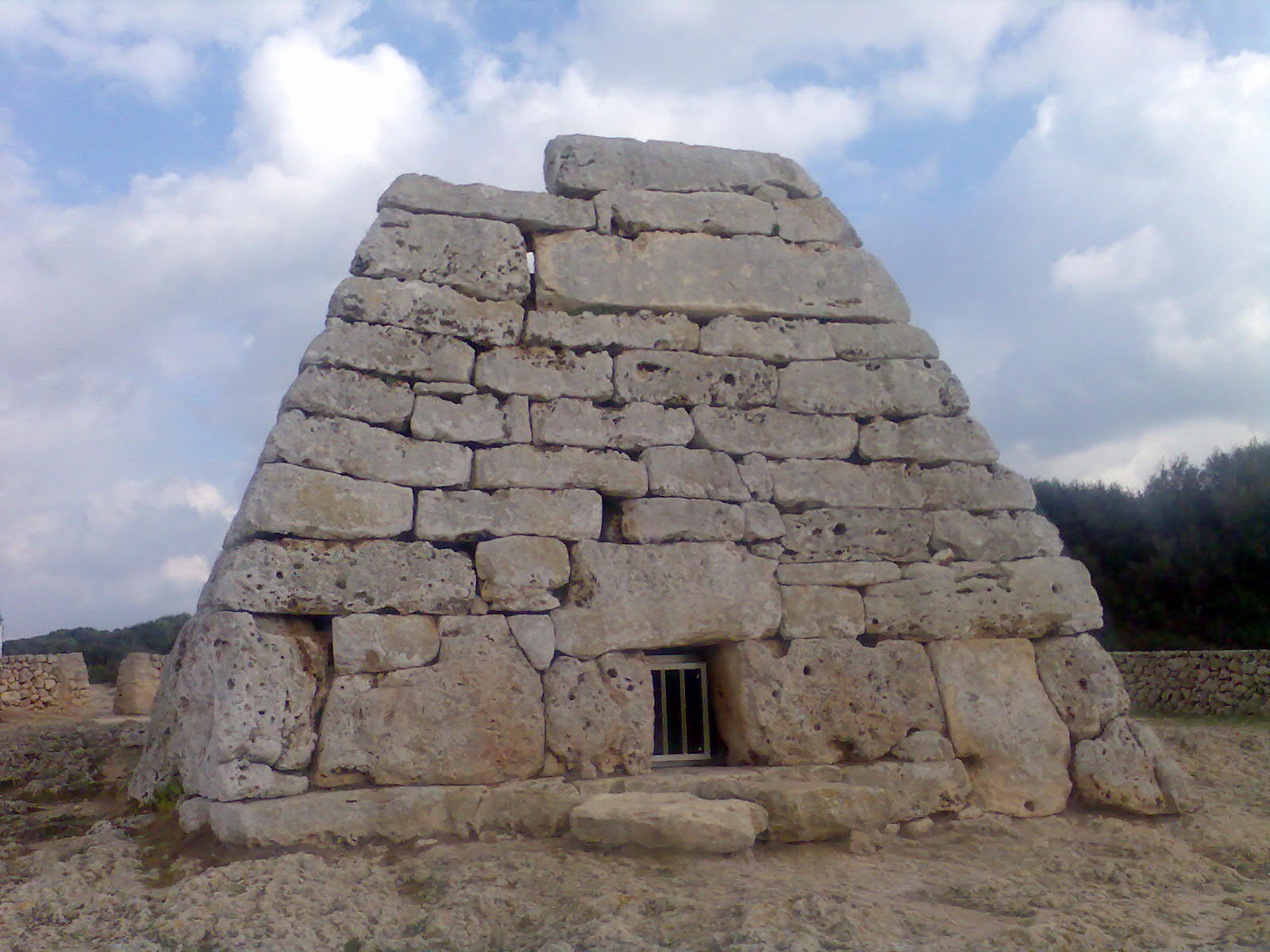
West South-West front end (2008)

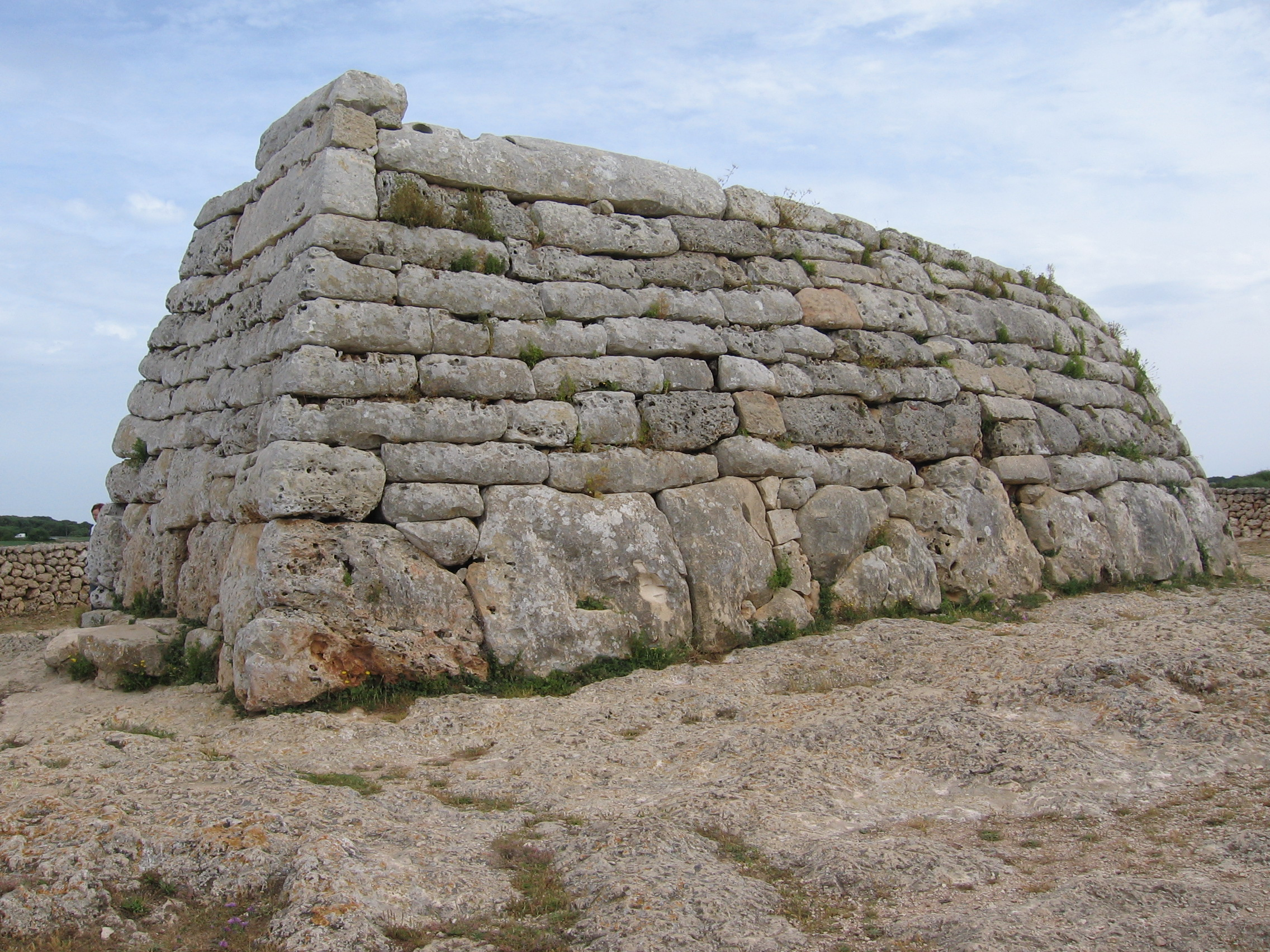
South South-East side wall (2007)

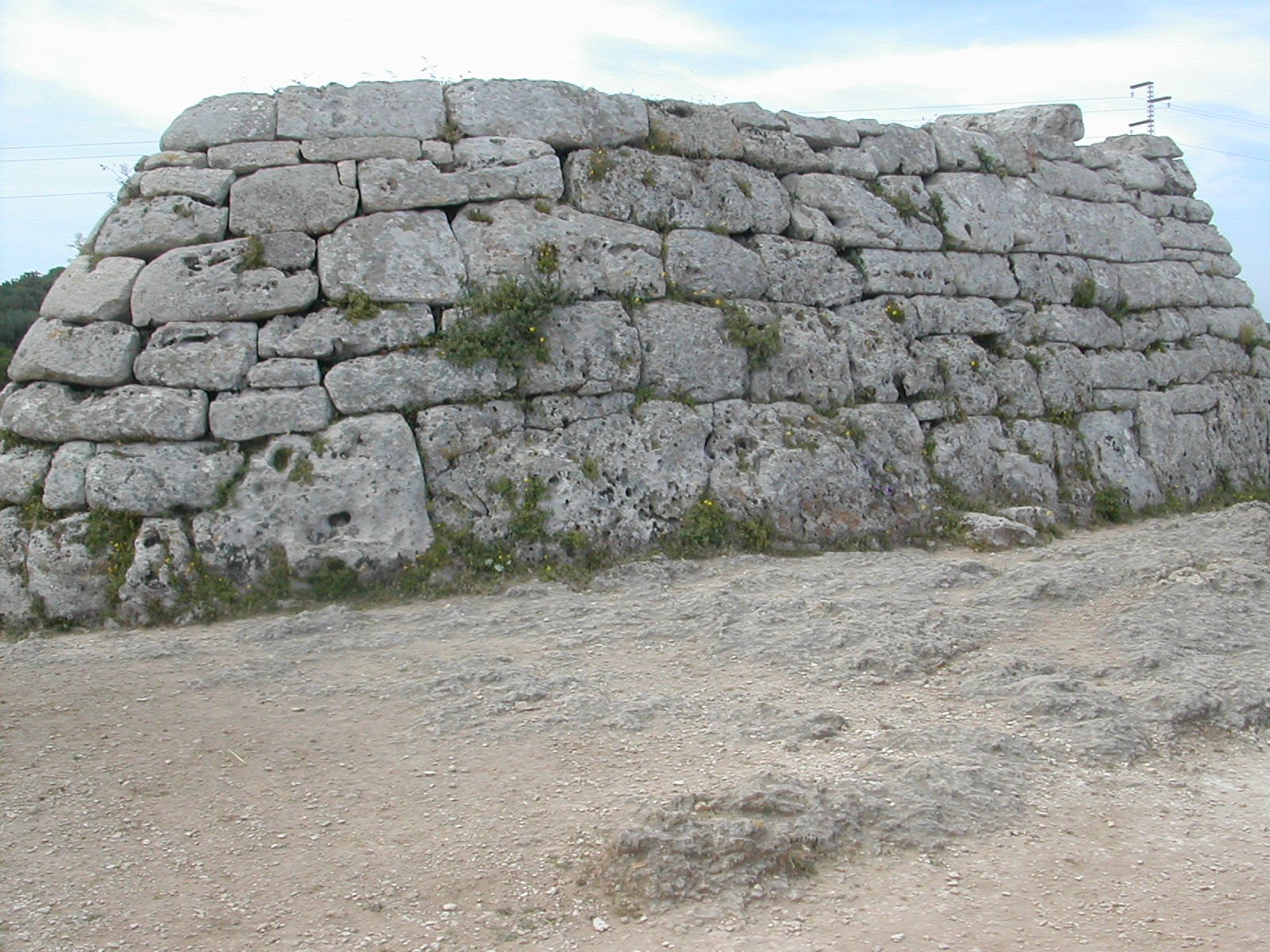
North North-West side wall (2004)

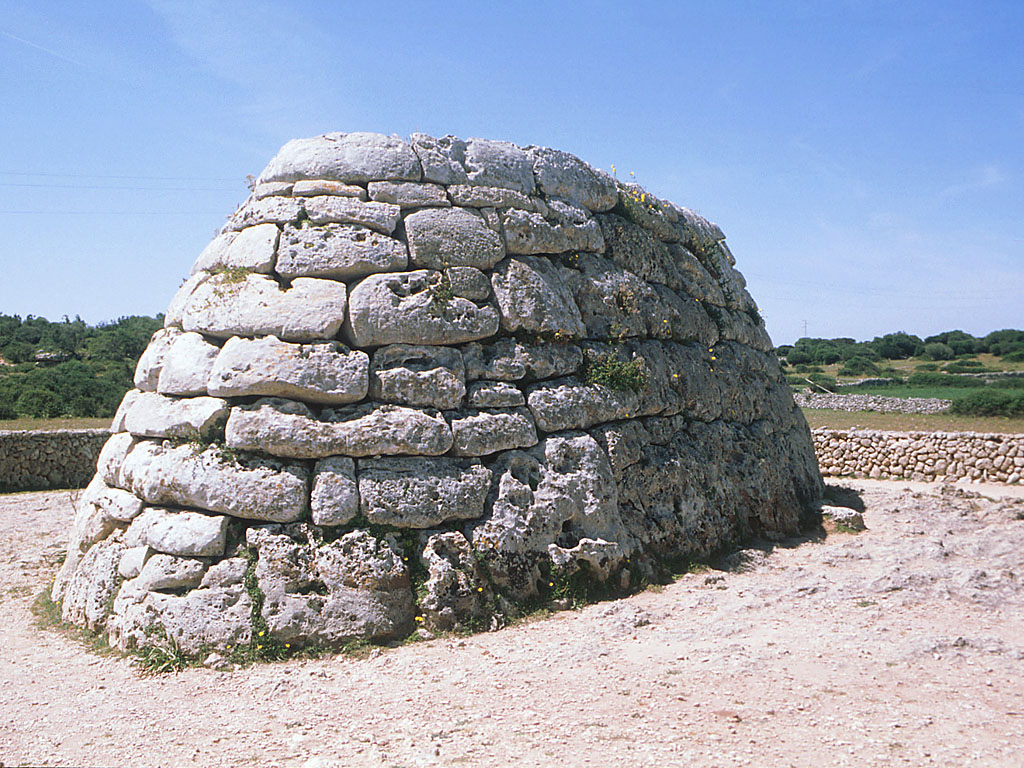
Apse (2006)

== See also ==
- Megalith
- Stone brick
