= Talaiotic culture =

Iron Age society in Mallorca and Menorca

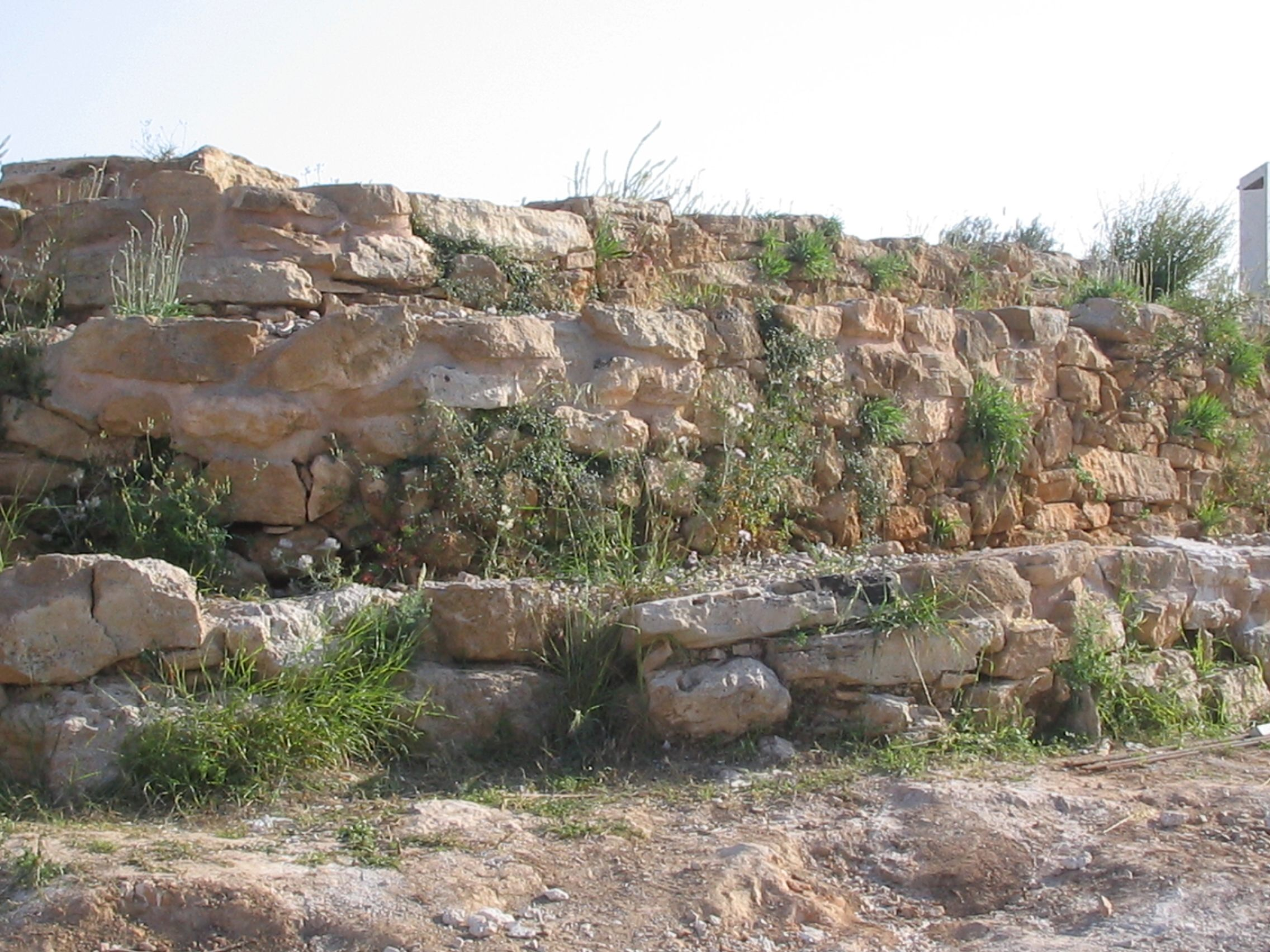
Tumulus near the archaeological park of Puig de sa Morisca. Son Ferrer, Calvià, Mallorca.

The Talaiotic culture or Talaiotic period is the name used to describe the society that existed on the Gymnesian Islands (the easternmost Balearic Islands) during the Iron Age. Its origins date from the end of the second millennium BC, when the inaccurately named Pre-Talaiotic Culture underwent a crisis and evolved into the Talaiotic Culture. Its name is derived from the talaiots, which are the most abundant and emblematic structures from the prehistoric period of the Balearic Islands.

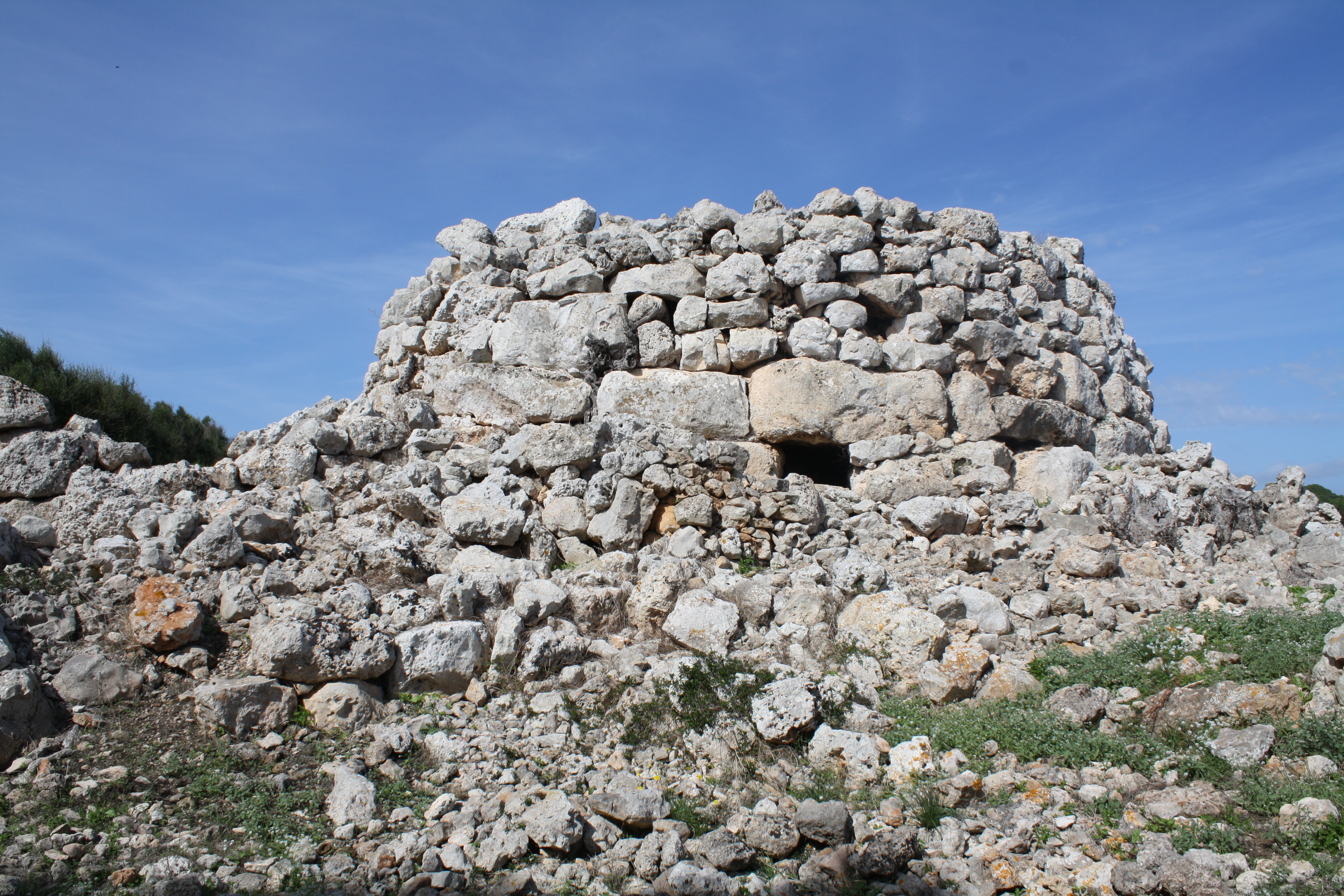
Talayot

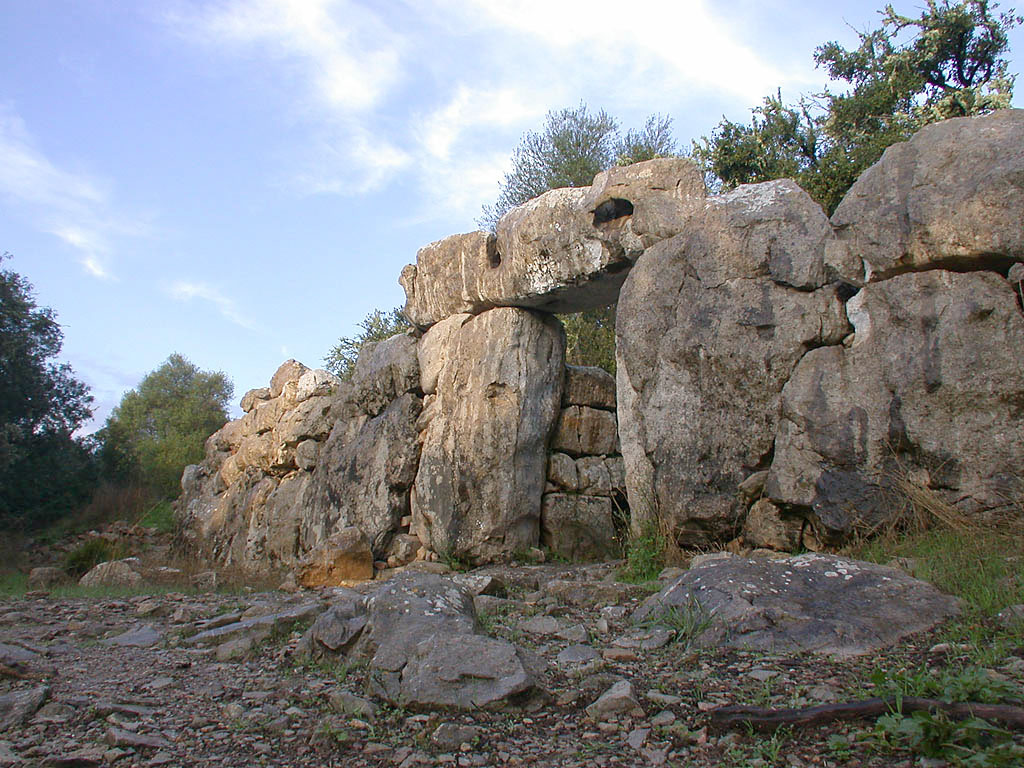
Entrance and wall of the Talaiotic village of Ses Païsses, Majorca.

== Periodization ==
It is important to bear in mind that the cultural complex known as Talayotic spans a very broad time frame, and there is no unanimous agreement among researchers regarding the systematization of its phases and chronology. Furthermore, this culture displays distinct and significant differences between Mallorca and Menorca, for example, in terms of its chronological development.

One of the first authors to address the material remains of this culture was Juan Ramis in 1818, in his work Celtic Antiquities of the Island of Menorca, which is the first book written entirely in Spanish to be dedicated to prehistory.

== Interpretative and chronological proposals ==
=== Proposal from the Museum of Menorca ===
One of the chronological frameworks for the Talayotic period in Menorca has been proposed by Lluís Plantalamor. According to this author, around 1500 BCE a significant cultural shift occurred due to the arrival of foreign people to the island of Menorca. Previous ways of life began to be abandoned, and the first clusters of houses and villages appeared, with a clear emphasis on defense (including walls and talayots), social hierarchy, communal labor specialization, and a gradual increase in the complexity of rituals and religious beliefs. Four distinct periods are identified:

==== Talayotic I (1500–1000 BCE) ====
A transitional period. Burial systems from the previous era persist (notably burial navetas), but new architectural models are introduced due to the community's defensive needs (talayots and walls). Pottery production becomes more refined, and bronze metallurgy is introduced. The most characteristic monument of the new culture is the talayot, which can be defined as a large truncated conical tower (truncated pyramidal in Mallorca), built with several concentric rings of large stones filled with smaller rocks. Unlike those in Mallorca, talayots in Menorca usually lack interior chambers.

==== Talayotic II (1000–700 BCE) ====
Construction systems from the pre-Talayotic period are abandoned, and large urban settlements develop. Social stratification and division of labor are reinforced, reflecting a fully urban cultural stage. From this period onward, a unique type of sanctuary appears in the Mediterranean: the taulas. These are enclosures with a roughly horseshoe-shaped floor plan, surrounded by cyclopean walls interspersed with columns. At their center stands a large monolithic pillar with a rectangular base, topped with a wide, flat capital—evoking the image of a table.

==== Talayotic III (700–300 BCE) ====
Increasing commercial contact with Greeks, Phoenicians, and Carthaginians leads the Talayotic people to reinforce their villages with additional defensive structures, such as bastions and watchtowers. New architectural styles are introduced, including circular houses with central courtyards. Luxurious bronze items and iron weaponry also begin to appear.

==== Talayotic IV (400/300–123 BCE) ====
Trade with the great seafaring civilizations of the Mediterranean intensifies. The exchange evolves from rare prestige goods (likely used to elevate Talayotic chieftains) to the transfer of essential goods and foodstuffs. Rome emerges as a dominant power, which adversely affects Menorca as it becomes increasingly marginalized after the defeat of its Carthaginian ally. Inland villages are destroyed and rebuilt during the Punic Wars, eventually falling into decline. Talayotic sanctuaries (taulas) are abandoned. In contrast, Talayotic settlements near major natural harbors gain prominence. The continued presence of foreign merchants attracts late Talayotic communities closer to their docking points.

=== Chronological proposal from the Autonomous University of Barcelona ===
This proposal, developed by the Mediterranean Social Archaeology Group led by V. Llull, suggests that the first Talayotic manifestations emerged around 1000 BCE, at a time when the earliest talayots appear alongside the last pre-Talayotic naviform structures. Their periodization is based on research conducted at the settlement of Son Fornés (Mallorca) and the caves of Es Càrritx and Mussol (Menorca). The group opts to name each stage based on the characteristic elements that defined life in the Balearic Islands at the time.

They divide the Talayotic period into three phases:

==== Pre-Talayotic (1050–850 BCE) ====
This phase sees the abandonment of domestic navetas, an increase in the establishment of larger settlements, a reduction in interaction with Mallorca, and the first signs of differentiated funerary treatment.

==== Talayotic (850–550 BCE) ====
The construction of the first talayots is identified, along with initial evidence of social stratification.

==== Post-Talayotic (550–123 BCE) ====
Monumental circular houses (círculos) emerge, and taula sanctuaries become the main architectural feature of settlements. Large necropolises with artificial caves are established (marking the beginning of burial with lime), and social complexity increases significantly. Contacts with the Punic world play a crucial role in integrating the islands into Mediterranean trade networks.

=== Chronological proposal from the University of the Balearic Islands ===
Based on the research of V. Guerrero, M. Calvo, and B. Salvá—all affiliated with the University of the Balearic Islands—this proposal suggests that the Talayotic culture is essentially an Iron Age society. Its origins are placed around 900 BCE with the construction of the first talayots, and it ends in 123 BCE with the Roman conquest of the Balearic Islands. A key element of this periodization is the view that Talayotic culture emerged from the internal evolution of Late Bronze Age pre-Talayotic societies, stimulated by the influence of Punic trade in the western Mediterranean.

=== Recent proposal ===
A more recent chronological proposal, focused specifically on Menorca and based on recent archaeological research, suggests that the development of Talayotic culture on the island has significantly different characteristics compared to Mallorca, and that the chronological development of both may not have been fully synchronous. According to this view, the Talayotic phenomenon in Menorca began around 1200 BCE. The first stage of this culture, Early Talayotic (1200–500 BCE), is marked by the construction of monumental structures known as talayots, around which new settlements emerged, replacing earlier naveta-style dwellings. The second stage, from 500 BCE until the Romanization of the island in the 1st century BCE, is referred to as Late Talayotic. It is characterized by a series of social changes, likely related to the increasing influence of the Punic colonial world.

== The Talaiotic Period in Mallorca ==
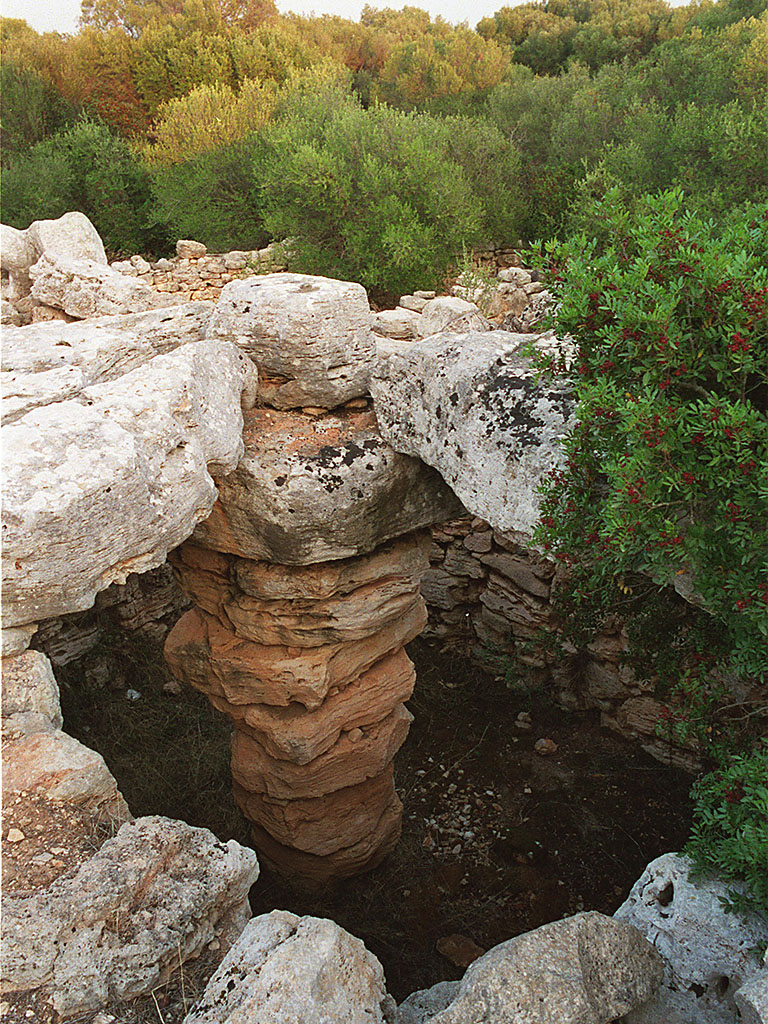
Central column and the slabs of the roof of a talaiot in Majorca.

The first great monuments on Mallorca from this period are the Layered Tumuli (Túmulos Escalonados), which had a funerary purpose. The date of their construction dates from the end of the second millennium BC to the beginnings of the first millennium BC, and many of the Tumuli are associated with hypogea from the Bronze Age. In sum, the society of this era is called "Proto-Talaiotic," since many features of the subsequent Talaiotic society begin to appear at this time. These features include the clustering of the population into towns. It has been confirmed that in some of these Talaiotic towns naviforme structures were dismantled in order to use the building material to build ordinary dwellings.

At the beginning of the first millennium BCE, talaiots began to proliferate on Mallorca, either appearing in isolated fashion as territorial markers, or in towns, but mostly grouped together in ceremonial centers. In Mallorca, these ceremonial centers were as abundant as the towns themselves. Some of them consisted of small groups of stone structures (talaiots, tumuli), scattered across the island, and frequently serving as boundary markers between the towns. Some of these ceremonial centers consisted of a line of up to seven stone structures across a distance of more than half a kilometer. The abundance of these centers serves as evidence of their importance: possibly they were where disputes were resolved and various rituals and festivities celebrated. These also served as a seasonal and economic calendar regulating activities such as sowing, harvest and hunting, at which the people of various towns could meet (thus guaranteeing outbreeding).

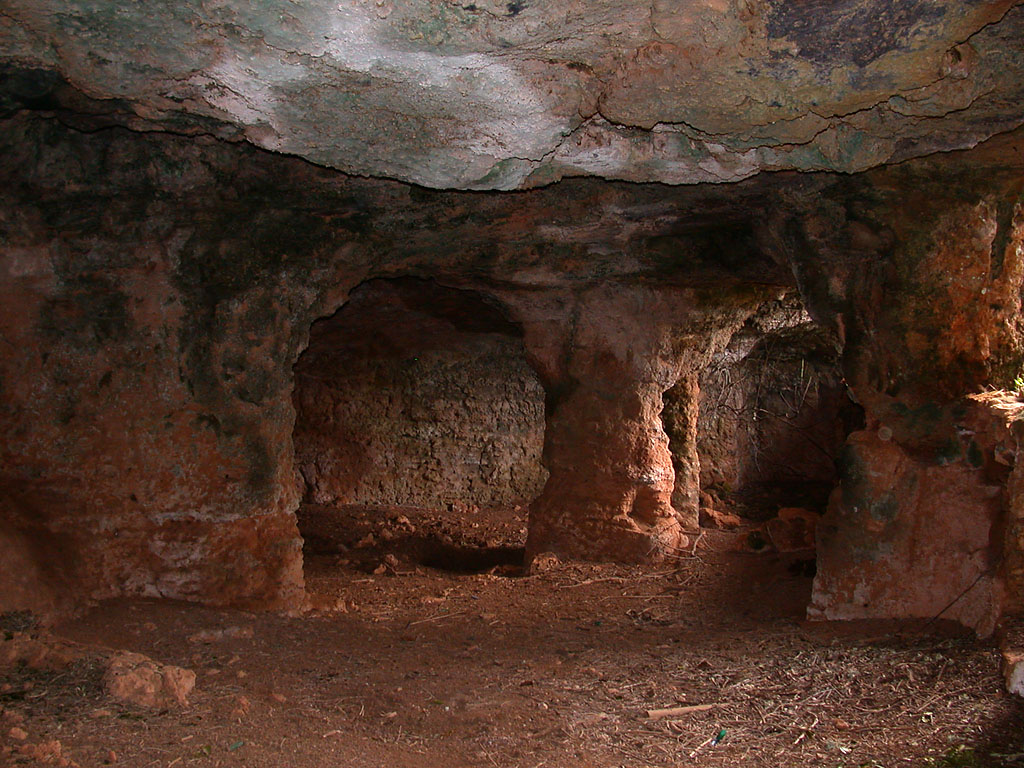
Interior of Talaiotic hypogeum of Mallorca, with a column excavated from the rock.

Sanctuaries also existed on the island, some recognizable by their two rear walls being rounded. Sanctuaries situated within the towns were small, and their interiors had only a single column, which was more or less centered. The sanctuaries in the countryside were much bigger (10–15 m.) and tended to have many pairs of columns.

The funerary monuments of Mallorca were varied, a characteristic similar to the previous age: burials were made in natural caves and in hypogea. The Talaiotic hypogea were much bigger than those from the Bronze Age, sometimes with columns excavated from the surrounding rock, and the enlargement of these columns provided a reason for enlarging the hypogea themselves. A large cemetery was also built, the Necropolis of Son Real, unique to Mallorca and Menorca. The Necropolis served as a cemetery in which the tombs were similar to small talaiots, and were either circular or square-shaped. Small "navetas" can also be found in the Necropolis. Despite the Talaiotic preference for burials to occur in hypogea, during the time of the Talaiotic Culture a novelty was introduced: the burial of a body with lime.

A 3,200-year-old well-preserved Bronze Age sword was discovered by archaeologists under the leadership of Jaume Deya and Pablo Galera on the Mallorca Island in the Puigpunyent from the stone megaliths site Talaiot. Specialists assumed that the weapon was made when the Talaiotic culture was in critical comedown. The sword will be on display at the nearby Majorca Museum.

== The Talaiotic Period in Menorca ==
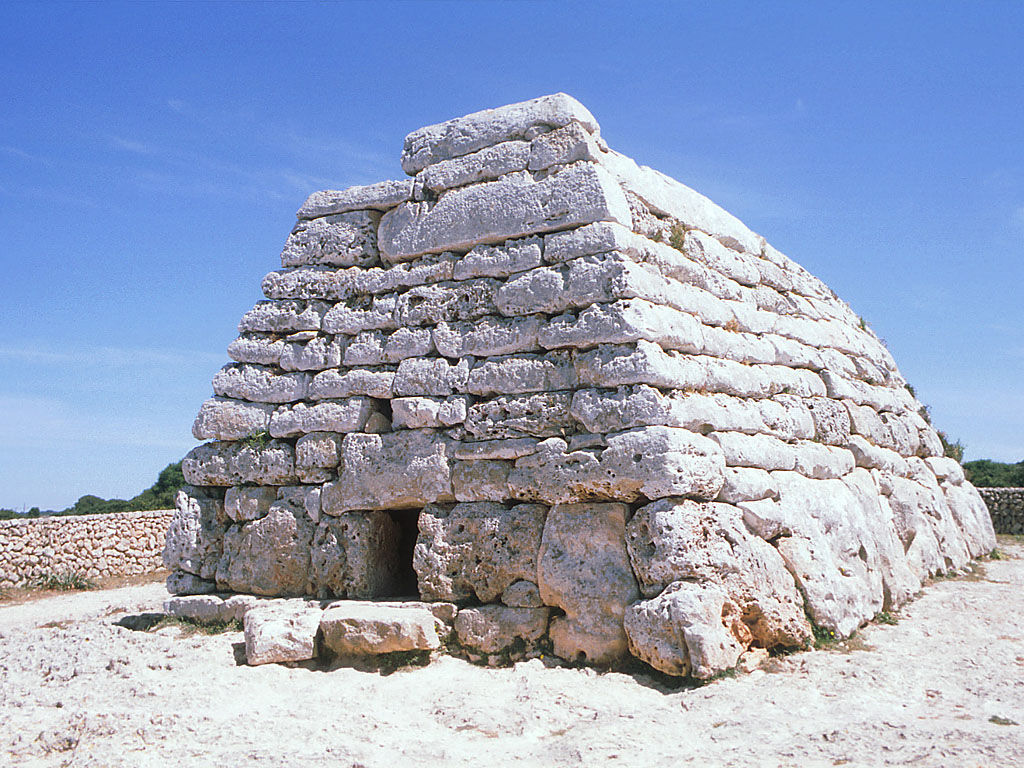
Tomb of Es Tudons, Menorca.

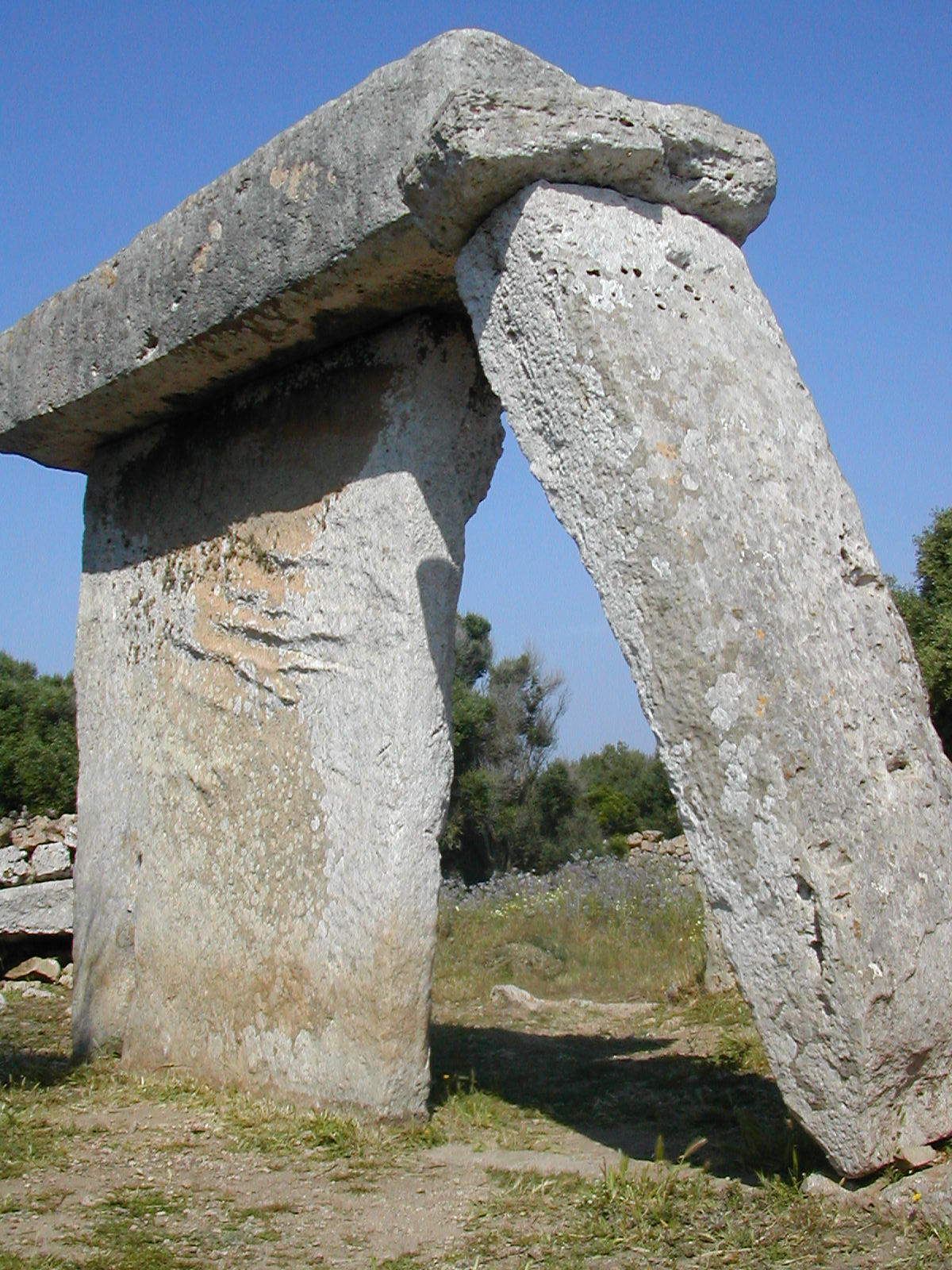
The Taula of Talatí de Dalt, near Maó, Menorca.

The reorganization of Menorcan society into chieftainships and towns occurred on similar lines to societal changes on Mallorca, although some Menorquin towns were much larger than Mallorquin ones, indicating, perhaps, the existence of stronger social changes or tensions. The variety of monuments on Menorca (besides talaiots) constructed from the end of the Bronze Age and throughout the Iron Age, surpasses that found on Mallorca. At the end of the 2nd millennium BC, there appeared tombs known as "navetas." They were built with Talaiotic techniques, but were also drawn from a very ancient tradition that contains many similarities to the tradition of the construction of dolmens going back a previous millennium.

The construction known as the Taula is considered the most emblematic ceremonial monument of Menorca. It served as a sanctuary, and its enclosure had a horseshoe form, similar to those found on Mallorca but unlike those had a great central structure resembling a table ("taula" means "table" in the Catalan language). The exact construction date of these sanctuaries is not known, although the enclosures could have existed throughout the Talaiotic, and the central monuments could belong to any date throughout the first millennium BC.

The first author to write about the Talayotic monuments of Menorca was Juan Ramis in his book Celtic antiques on the island of Menorca, which was edited in 1818, being the first book in the Spanish language entirely devoted to Prehistory.

=== Domestic space ===
After the abandonment of naviform settlements—evidenced at various archaeological sites such as Cala Morell, Son Mercer de Baix, and others—the population relocated to new villages, though the form of their houses is uncertain, due to later remodeling and construction.

=== The Talayot ===
The architectural element that gives the cultural period its name, the talayots are the most numerous monuments of prehistoric Menorca (over 300), but due to the limited number of excavations, they remain among the least understood structures of the period. Recent excavations suggest their origins date to the late 2nd millennium BCE and that they remained in use until approximately 500 BCE. Unlike those in Mallorca, talayots in Menorca show great typological diversity. Some have attached structures, like the one at Cornia Nou; others are square in plan, elliptical, or include interior chambers such as the talayot of Sant Agustí Vell, or feature corridors.

The exact function of these buildings is unknown. Their typological diversity suggests multiple purposes, such as watchtowers within settlements, buildings with cultic significance, symbols representing elite power, or territorial control structures.

There is clear evidence for the construction of talayots in Menorca around 1000 BCE—for example, at Cornia Nou—whereas in Mallorca, the earliest evidence does not seem to go beyond 850 BCE. In both islands, at least some of these structures appear to have fallen into decline between 600 and 500 BCE, coinciding with the onset of Punic influence. This phase, known as the Post-Talayotic Period, Final Talayotic Period, or Balearic Period, is characterized by increasing influence from Punic culture and ended with the Roman conquest of the islands in 123 BCE.

=== Buildings attached to the Talayot ===
Although domestic dwellings from this period have not been documented, a group of buildings attached to the western talayot of Cornia Nou has been excavated and dates to this period. These are rectangular structures with sharply defined corners that surround the talayot. Built using cyclopean masonry, the walls are thick, tall, and feature double-facing construction. Archaeological evidence suggests these were food-processing facilities—especially for grain and meat—and were likely involved in the redistribution of food. This supports the hypothesis of emerging social stratification, where an elite class may have controlled essential resources.

=== Religious structures ===
Little to nothing is currently known about religious buildings from the Talayotic period. As mentioned earlier, caves appear to have been abandoned as ritual spaces (e.g., Cova d'es Mussol), and rituals seem to have moved into the settlements themselves. At Trepucó, there are remains of a structure predating the taula enclosure, but it cannot be definitively identified as a religious building.

=== Funerary spaces ===
During the transition from the pre-Talayotic to the Talayotic period and in the first phase of the Early Talayotic, changes are detected in the funerary rituals of caves with masonry (such as Cueva d'es Càrritx), navetas, and the use of new funerary spaces, such as natural caves (like Cueva d'es Pas) and simple-plan hypogea. Among the new rituals, one of the most notable is the hair ritual (painting, cutting, and storing it in horn tubes), which is documented in the caves of Cueva d'es Càrritx (Algendar), Cueva d'es Pas (Algendar), and Cueva d'es Morts (Mongofra).

All this diversity of rituals and funerary sites becomes somewhat blurred during the period of maximum splendor of Talayotic culture, from 850-800 BCE to 500 BCE. The hypogeum XXI of Cales Coves is one of the few places, along with the final phase of the Cueva d'es Càrritx and Cueva d'es Pas, that provides us with information. Although the hypogeum has been looted, the excavation revealed remains of wooden stretchers and coffins where the dead were buried, several grave goods such as spearheads, a silver earring, etc., and the presence of bull tail vertebrae along with plugs made from ox femurs, suggesting the possible symbolic importance of the bull during this period.

== The end of the Talaiotic Period ==
The very factors that gave rise to the Talaiotic Period spelled its doom. Construction of talaiots ceased, and many of them were destroyed or converted for different uses. The nearby Punic center of Ebusus, present-day Ibiza, increased its commercial influence to include the Gymnesian Islands; this economic extension in effect transformed itself into a Punic colonization of the Gymnesian Islands. The Mediterranean subsequently became dominated by the Roman and Carthaginian Empires. The Punic Wars would erupt between these two powers, and the islands of Mallorca and Menorca would be forcibly dragged into what is called the Post-Talaiotic Period (also known as the Balearic Culture or Post-Talaiotic Culture).

== Genetic profile ==
Five samples from individuals that were alive in the Talaiotic period were taken for genetic analysis; the individual found in the funerary monument of Naveta des Tudons (Ciutadella), dated between 904-817 BC, had Y-chromosome R1b-P312, his autosomal components were ~65% Anatolian farmer, ~15% Western hunter-gatherer, ~20% Yamnaya. Two individuals of the collective burial cave Es Forat de ses Aritges (Ciutadella) had the Y-chromosome R1b-M269, another the derived clade R1b-P312, and another the subclade R1b-Z195. The autosomal components of these four individuals were ~55% Anatolian farmer, ~15% Western hunter-gatherer, ~30% Yamnaya.

== Talayotic Menorca: UNESCO World Heritage ==
Talayotic Menorca is a site inscribed on the UNESCO World Heritage List in 2023. It consists of a series of archaeological sites that testify to an exceptional prehistoric island culture, characterized by unique cyclopean architecture. The island preserves exclusive monuments such as funerary navetas, circular houses, taula sanctuaries, and talayots, all of which remain in full harmony with the Menorcan landscape and its connection to the sky.

Menorca has one of the richest archaeological landscapes in the world, shaped by generations that have preserved the Talayotic legacy. It has the highest density of prehistoric sites per square meter on any island and serves as a symbol of its insular identity.

This area is divided into nine zones covering archaeological sites and associated landscapes, with a chronology ranging from the emergence of cyclopean construction around 1600 BCE to the Romanization in 123 BCE. The exceptional value of its monuments and landscapes led to its inscription on the UNESCO World Heritage List in 2023.
