= Protonaveta =

Type of prehistoric tomb on Menorca

A Protonaveta, according to some authors, is a triple-walled tomb, while according to others, it is a collective funerary structure built using Cyclopean technique (the use of large stones arranged in courses), of funerary nature and exclusive to the island of Menorca. It has a circular floor plan and up to three concentric stone walls, filled in with smaller stones, which together form a single wall. They were built at the end of the Chalcolithic period and were used until the end of the Bronze Age or the Pre-Talayotic Period of Menorca. Although they bear a strong resemblance to the navetas (burial chambers), they do not belong to the same chronological period.

== Structures prior to the protonavetas or triple-walled tombs ==
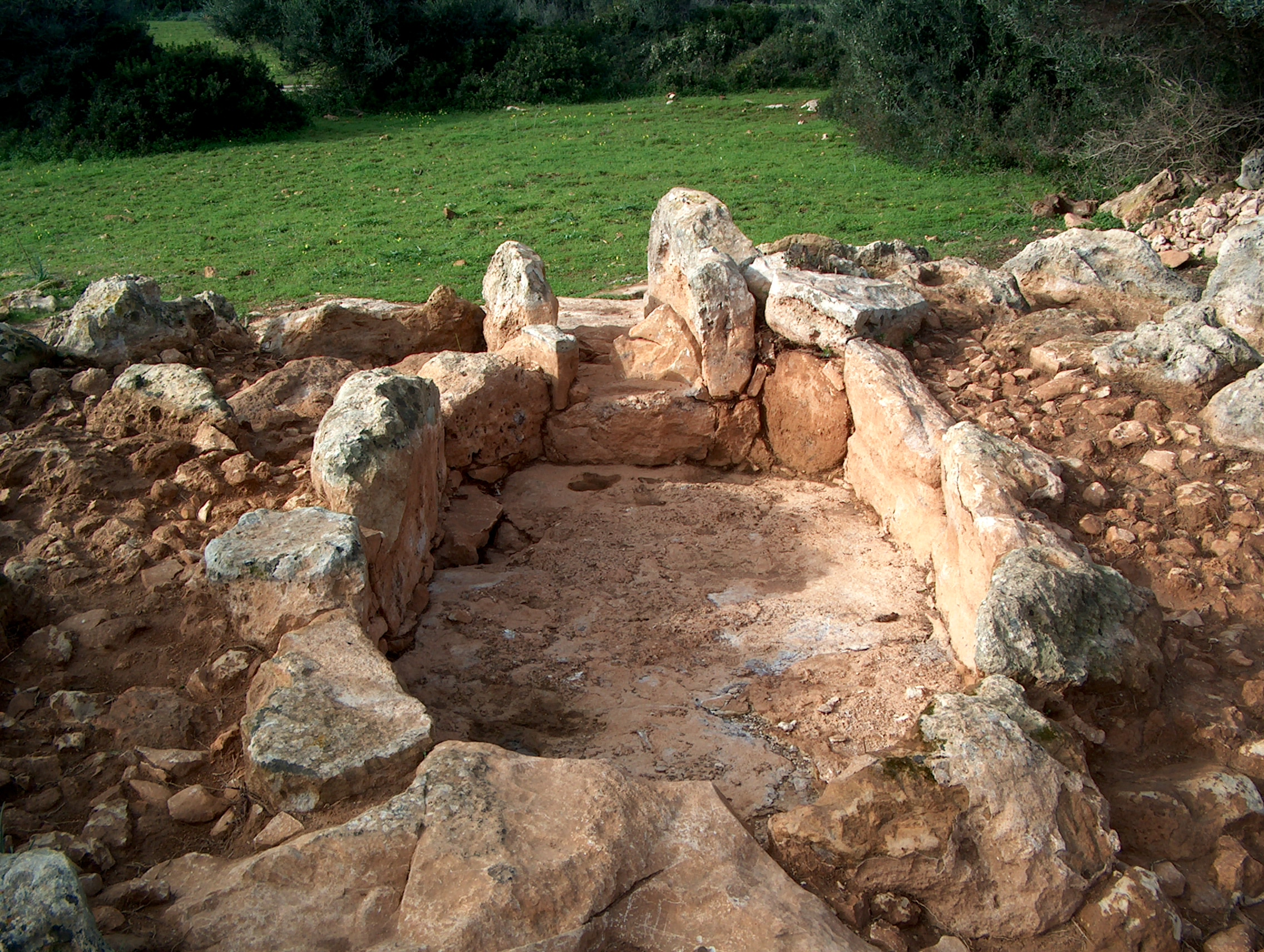
Protonaveta of Ses Arenes de Baix. Interior of the funerary chamber (Ciutadella de Menorca).

The evolution of prehistoric funerary structures in Menorca is not linear, but both earlier and later buildings than the protonavetas have been documented. Thus, preceding the protonavetas or triple-walled tombs are the megalithic tombs, also known as dolmens. These are funerary structures built with large slabs, featuring a rectangular funerary chamber accessed via a corridor, which is entered through a pierced slab placed in the façade. According to Lluís Plantalamor, it has been observed that the megalithic tombs are concentrated in a small area of Menorca's geography, specifically between the San Clemente (Mahón) area and the southeast of Alayor. It has also been noted that they are often located on hillsides. Anthropologists, through the study of skeletal remains, have documented that these were collective burial buildings, meaning people were buried without distinction of sex or age. The most well-known megalithic tombs are Ses Roques Llises, Montplè, and Alcaidús.

== Protonavetas or triple-walled tombs ==
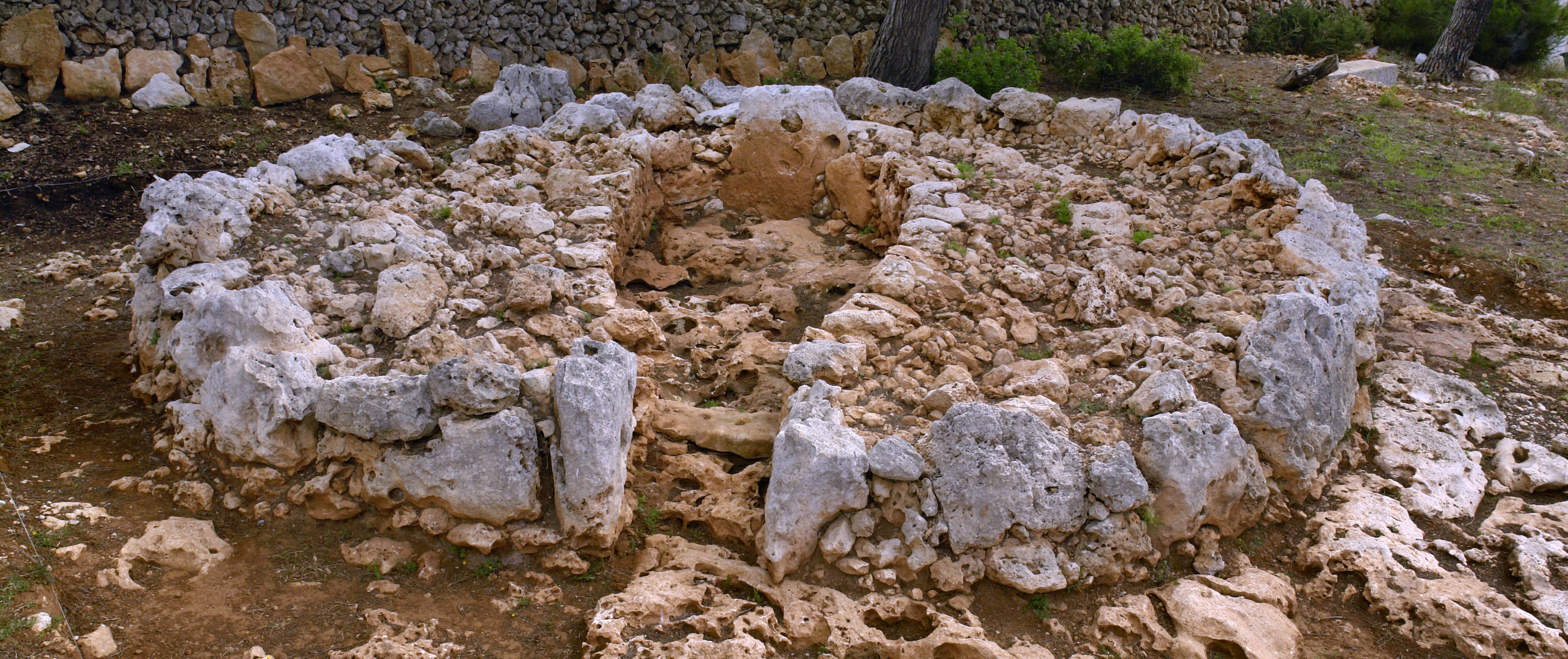
Protonaveta of Son Olivaret (Ciutadella, Menorca)

The protonavetas, or triple-walled tombs, were first documented in the early 21st century at the archaeological sites of Son Olivaret and Ses Arenes de Baix. All of them are organized around a central oval-shaped chamber, which is surrounded by three concentric rows of large stones. These would have served to support the earthen mound that covered the structure.

However, there are structural differences between the tombs of Son Olivaret and Ses Arenes de Baix. For example, in the Son Olivaret tomb, specifically in the apse, a vertically positioned stone was documented—something that was not found in the Ses Arenes de Baix tomb. Nevertheless, it cannot be definitively said that it never existed there, as archaeologists have documented the absence of certain architectural elements. There are also differences in the entrance structures.

The protonavetas share architectural features with the megalithic tombs of Binidalinet and Montplè, but especially with those of Alcaidús and Ses Roques Llises. Still, a key distinction lies in the shape of the chamber and the entrance corridor. Additionally, in the cases of Son Olivaret and Ses Arenes de Baix, no perforated slab has been documented. Chronologically, these structures were used between 1700 and 1300 BCE, coinciding with the end of the use of dolmens.

The skeletal remains from both sites were studied by physical anthropologists. Their research determined that these were collective-use funerary structures, meaning more than one individual was buried in them. Specifically, at the Son Olivaret site, it was established that at least 30 individuals were buried during the Pre-Talayotic period, including adults, children, juveniles, and even infants.

== Structures later than the protonavetas or triple-walled tombs ==
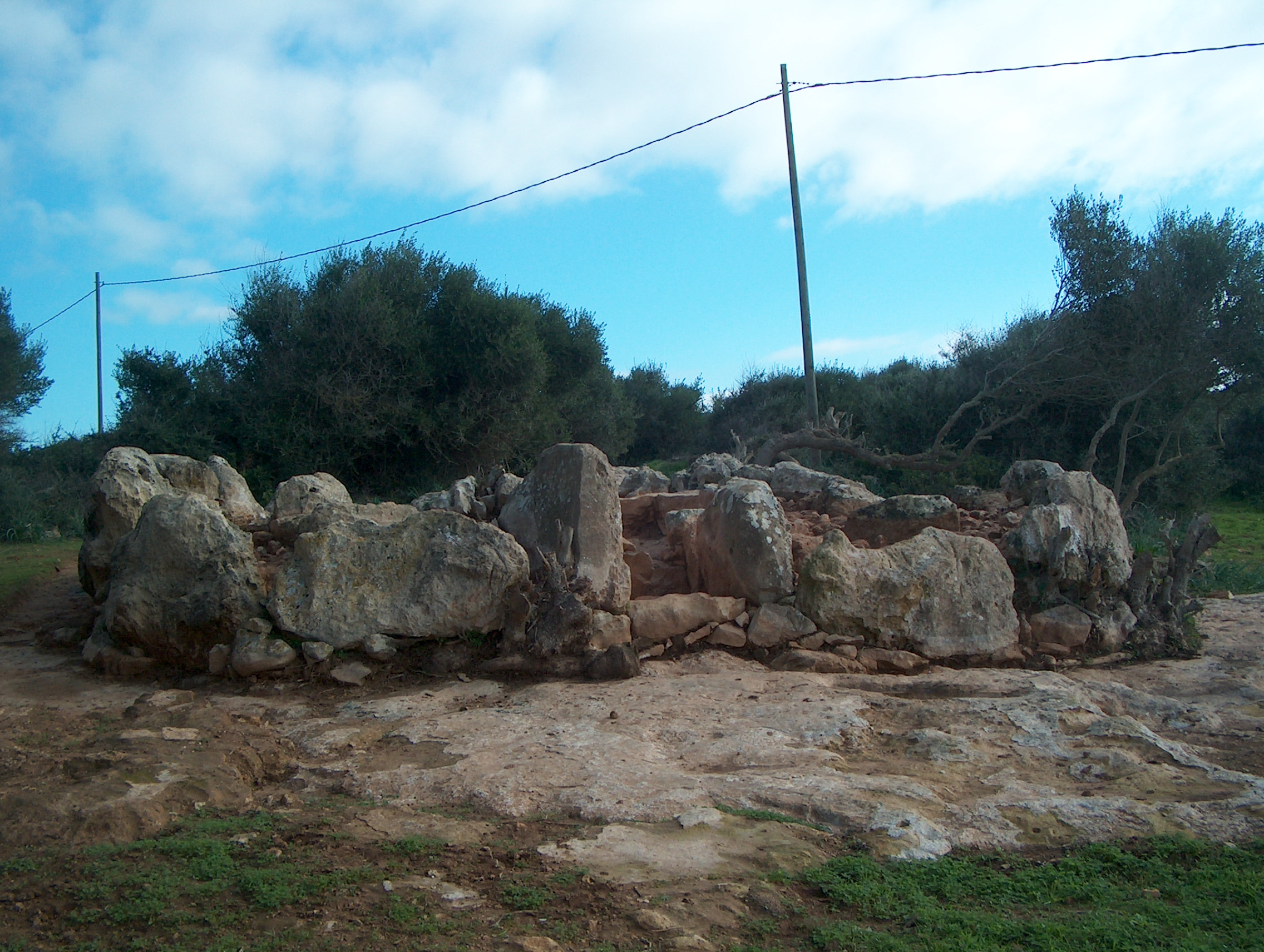
Triple-walled tomb or protonaveta of Ses Arenes de Baix (Ciutadella, Menorca)

Whether or not the internal evolution followed the models previously described, archaeologists have been able to document that the funerary structure that chronologically follows the protonavetas or triple-walled tombs is the circular-plan navetas, also known as intermediate-type navetas. These structures also resemble megalithic tombs and protonavetas, but are characterized by having a rectangular chamber and an entrance corridor with a perforated slab separating the chamber from the corridor. The key difference from the previously mentioned structures lies in the fact that, in these buildings, the earthen mound of the megalithic tomb is replaced by a stone covering, which makes the evolution toward burial navetas more plausible. Some examples of this type of structure include: Biniac-Argentina East and West, Torrellisar Vell, Torralbet, and Cotaina.

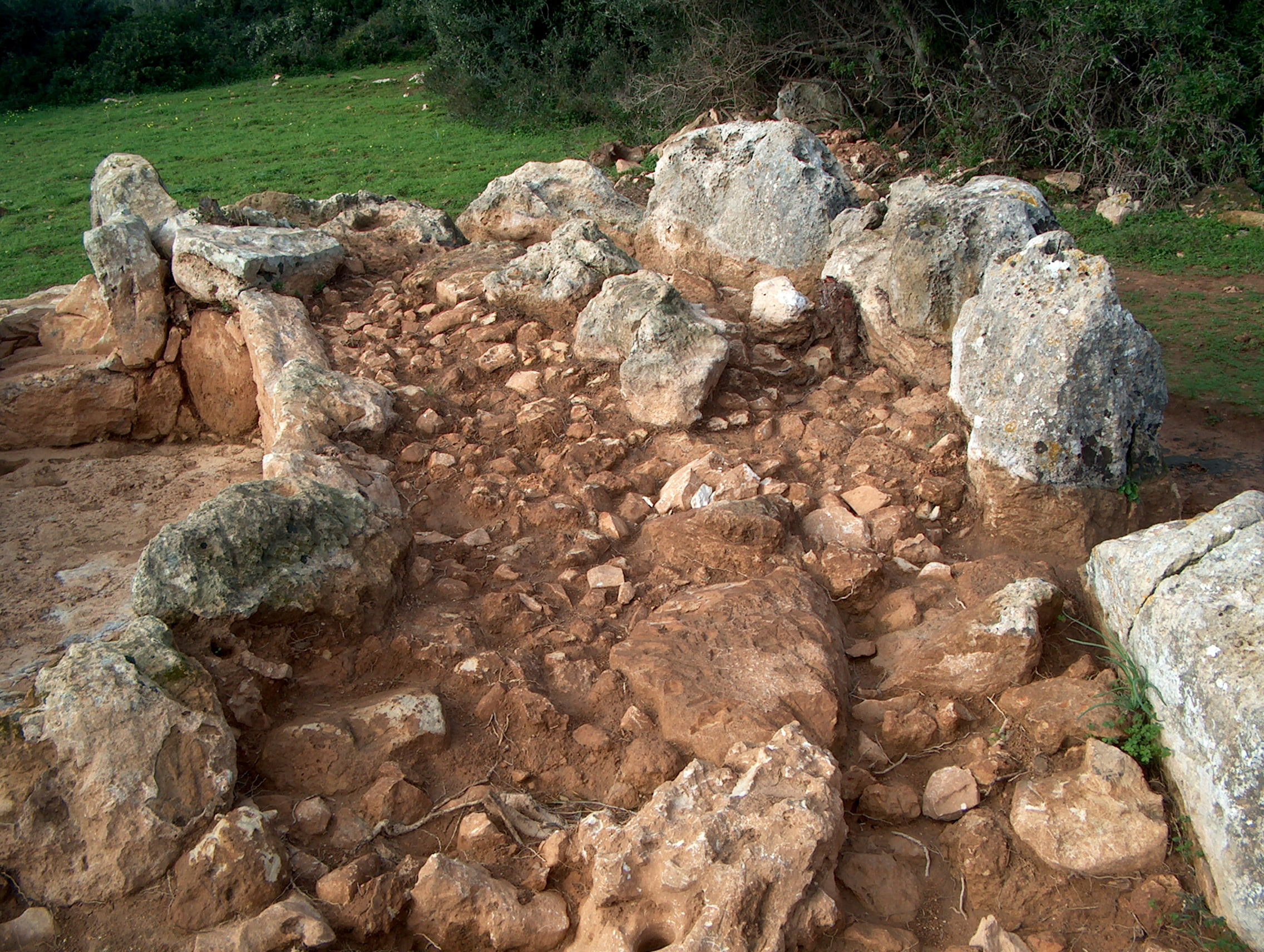
Triple-walled tomb or protonaveta of Ses Arenes de Baix (Ciutadella, Menorca)

Plantalamor was able to document that the circular or intermediate-type navetas were located in a very specific area of Menorca—to the north of the megalithic tombs. In other words, all circular-plan navetas are found near the road from Mahón to Alayor, and from San Clemente to Cala'n Porter and Alayor, with the exception of Torrellisar Vell, which is located slightly further west.
