= Eastern Biniac naveta =

Coordinates: 39°54′54″N 4°10′43″E

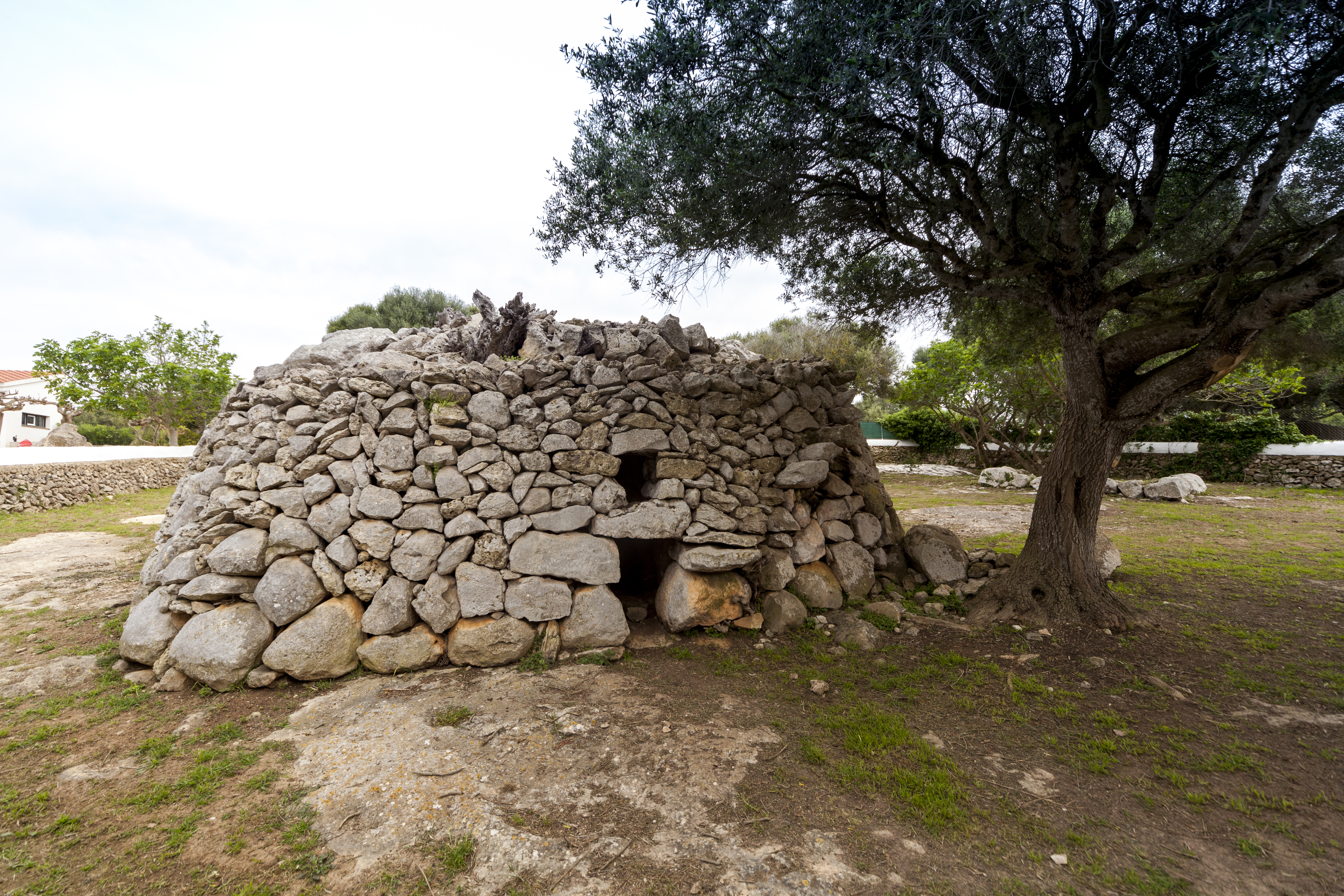
Eastern Biniac naveta

Eastern Biniac is a funerary naveta on the island of Menorca, where collective inhumations were made during the Bronze Age. Access to the site is possible from the Mahón–Ciudadela main road (Me-1), at kilometer 8.1, where there is a detour to the left which leads to the area called "Argentina". The Eastern Biniac naveta is located right at the entrance of the property that belongs to "Lloc de Menorca".

== Characteristics ==
Eastern Biniac naveta has a circular layout with an es de planta circular, with the outer wall battering inwards. This wall has horizontal stone locks placed in a horizontal position, following the cyclopean masonry technique, which can be found in many other prehistoric buildings in Menorca. The building's entrance is located at the southern side. A wall was built in an indeterminate period, which abuts the southern side of the naveta, partially covering it.

A long corridor leads to an oval chamber, whose sides have an irregular aspect and which were built by projecting the blocks inward, forming a concave formation. The roof consists of a set of horizontal stone slabs. The building's dimensions are: external length 11,10 m; external width 10,70 m; interior length 3,90 m; interior width 2,30 m.

It has been discussed whether this type of navetas, which are called "intermediate navetas", would be half-way between megalithic tombs and long layout navetas, the latter being more recent. In 1960's archaeologist María Luisa Serra Belabre carried out a brief excavation project on its upper part. No archaeological remains have been found in the chamber either, since it was reused as a cattle shelter for many years and, for this reason, all the sediment inside this building was removed. However, thanks to excavations carried out in other navetas, we know that these buildings were used to place the deceased members of a family or a small community. The bodies were accompanied with a set of objects or grave goods related to their beliefs about the afterlife.

Chronological framework:1500-1000 BC. (Bronze Age).

== Bibliography ==
- Plantalamor, L., López, A. (1983). La naveta occidental de Biniac-Argentina, (Alayor-Menorca). Noticiario Arqueológico Hispánico, 15: 361-381.
