= Naviforme =

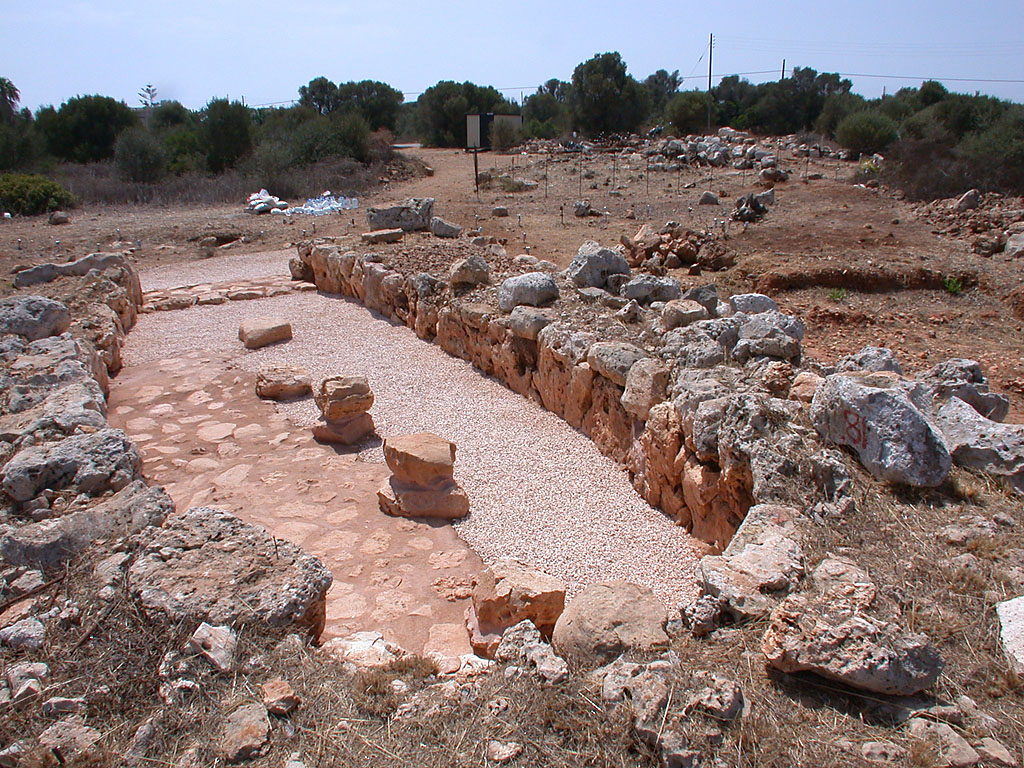
Naviforme

A naviforme (initially, navetiforme) was a prehistoric boat-shaped house built on the Balearic Islands of Spain. The hut-like buildings date to the Early Bronze Age or the Pretalayotic Period (ca. 2500–1200 B.C.). The building was generally large and had strong walls. It had dual functions for productive activities and living spaces. Examples of Naviformes are found in various villages but good examples have been excavated at Boquer, Sa Vall, and Son Mercer de Baix.

The word naviforme originated from the building's resemblance to another prehistoric Menorcan structure, the naveta. Given the resemblance in their construction, the naviform was initially called a "navetiforme", a form of a "neveta", though, over time, the word was simplified to naviforme. When some are found together, it is difficult to distinguish between them, despite the naviforme being a home and the naveta being a tomb. Researchers believe that an extended family averaging 20 people could live in a naviforme.

== Construction ==
Naviform were constructed of dry stone, using the cyclopean construction technique. A flat stone with a half-buried base underlies the first course of very large stones. They continue upwards with more stones that get much smaller. A cross-section of a wall consists of three parts: the outer wall with the largest stones, the inner wall, corresponding to the interior of the cabin, and between them a filling of earth and tiny stones. The two walls are tilted so that the wall thickness decreases with height and is supported with the filling materials between the two.

Although very long, the building has a characteristic shape of a ship. Typical dimensions would be 8 m (26 ft) wide, to 15 m (49 ft) or 20 m (66 ft) long. The great thickness of its walls, averaging 2.5 m (8.2 ft) makes the useful space of the inner chamber small. Most ceilings were not preserved, but presumably, they were of natural material with a pitched roof made of thick branches in the form of beams, and covered with branches, leaves and mud, all supported on a number of columns arranged along the longitudinal axis of the building. The only preserved ceiling is made of stone slabs, but it is not believed to be typical, as the fact of its being made of stone may have been the determining factor in its present-day existence.

In many cases, there are several attached naviforms, forming groups of up to four. However, these correspond to buildings added at different times. Inside many of them can be found complex structures made of mud and flat tiles, placed horizontally and vertically, that served as a kitchen and storage room. Often found are small walls that divide the room into three or four smaller rooms. These are modifications of Roman times, as many of the huts remained in use for nearly two millennia.

Its only entrance is on its flat end. Small holes were located in the ground opposite the entrance, forming a semicircle for a porch. The entrance had a top slab functioning as a lintel, and another half buried in the ground which was the threshold. Beneath this slab, it was common to find remains of a small fire from the ritual opening of the housing.
