= Gymnesian Islands =

Collective name of Mallorca and Menorca

Coordinates: 39.81276°N 3.57605°E

Latin map of the Balearic Islands, with the eastern islands named Gymnesiæ.

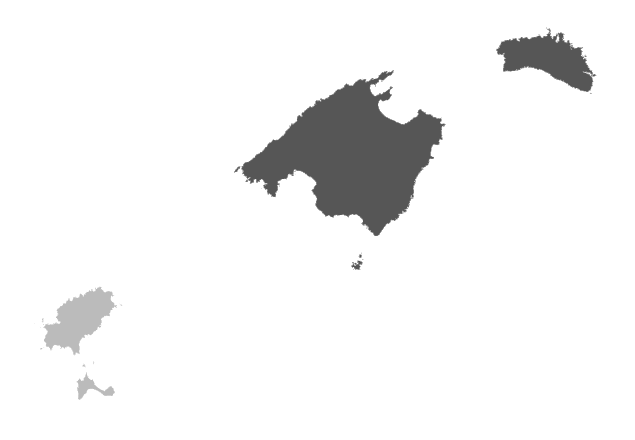
Gymnesian Islands (in dark grey)

The Gymnesians (Catalan: Gimnèsies [ʒimˈnɛziəs], Spanish: Gimnesias [ximˈnesjas]), or Gymnesic Islands (Catalan: Illes Gimnèsiques), is a collective name given to the two largest (and easternmost) Balearic Islands, Mallorca and Menorca, distinguishing them from the Pityuses (Catalan: Illes Pitiüses; Spanish: Pitiusas), or Pine Islands, Ibiza and Formentera.

== Etymology ==
The word Gymnesian (from the Greek: γυμνήτες gymnetes) means 'naked'. The Greeks called the islands Gymnesiae (Ancient Greek: Γυμνήσιαι). According to Diodorus Siculus, the Greeks called the islands thus because the inhabitants were naked during the summer time. The Ancient Greeks recruited the local inhabitants of these islands, the Talaiotics, as slingers. According to some researchers, this does not mean that they fought naked, but that they used much lighter armament than the hoplites.

== Name usage ==
Later the Phoenicians referred to both Mallorca and Menorca as the Baliarides. After the whole archipelago (the Pityuses and Gymnesians) came under Roman rule, the islands gained the overall Latin name Insulae Baliares or Baleares Insulae; the collective concept has continued in use in modern languages, hence ultimately the English name Balearic Islands.
