= Juan Ramis =

Spanish lawyer, writer and historian (1746–1819)

Juan Ramis y Ramis
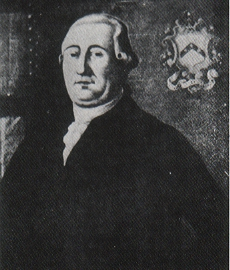
- Born: 27 April 1746; Mahón, Menorca, British Empire
- Died: 12 February 1819 (aged 72); Mahón, Menorca, Balearic Islands, Spain
- Education: Real Universidad Literaria de Mallorca Avignon University
- Occupations: Lawyer; writer; historian
- Era: British Menorca
- Known for: Only writer to write neoclassical works in Catalan and founding the Societat Maonesa
- Notable work: Lucrècia (1769) Arminda (1771) Rosaura o el més constant amor (1783)
- Movement: Enlightenment
- Parent(s): Bartomeu Ramis and Caterina Ramis

Juan Ramis y Ramis (27 April 1746 – 12 February 1819) was a lawyer, writer and historian from Menorca, Balearic Islands.

== Biography ==
Ramis y Ramis was born and died in Mahón. He was the son of Bartolomé Ramis y Serra and Caternia Ramis y Calafat, and was the eldest of eight siblings: Pere (1748–1816), who was a distinguished lawyer and translator; Bartolomé (1751–1837), doctor; José (1766–1821), priest; Antonio (1771–1840), who took over the historiographic work of Juan; Ramon; Marianna, married to Nicolau Orfila (a lawyer from Ferreries and member of Societat Maonesa); and Joana.

Since his early days he was instructed in Latin grammar, arithmetic and some modern languages. In 1762 he was sent to Palma de Mallorca to study rhetoric and philosophy in the University of Letters of Mallorca, where he was promoted to Bachelor of Philosophy on 5 March 1765 and appointed Master and Doctor in Liberal Arts four days later, with the distinction nemine discrepante. He continued his studies by enrolling in Civil and Canon Law in the Pontifical University of Avignon, where he got the doctoral tassel on 15 July 1767.

Once he finished his studies, he decided to settle down in Mahón, where he combined his job as a lawyer in several public positions (sub-delegate judge of the vice-admiral of Menorca between 1780 and the Spanish conquest in 1783) and his intellectual endeavours. In 1778 he founded, along with Captain Joan Roca i Vinent, the Societat Maonesa de Cultura (Mahón Society for Culture), which had its quarters in his own house. The society mainly dealt with natural and human sciences, and its members also read translations of works by Voltaire, Wieland and Young, amongst others.

== Work ==
Four main periods in the evolution of the work of Ramis can be observed through his books:

First period

This first period, which took place during the second British domination (1763–1781), was the most prolific of them all. He wrote dramatic neoclassical plays in which he skilfully used the Catalan language to compose the French Alexandrine rhyming couplet: Lucrècia (1769), Arminda (1775) and Constància (1779). Moreover, as a founding member of Societat Maonesa de Cultura, he carried out an intense intellectual task until its dissolution in 1785.

An analysis of the works found in his library sheds light on his literary preferences: Greco-Roman classical works including those written by Homer, Horace, Virgil, Ovid, Seneca the Younger, Terence; 17th and 18th centuries writers such as Nicolas Boileau-Despréaux, Jean Racine and Voltaire; English classical and contemporary authors such as Shakespeare, Thomson and Young; as well as Italians such as Petrarch, Torquato Tasso and Pietro Metastasio; and some German writers such as Gessner.

Second period

In this period, which took place between 1783 and 1793, historiography became the central focus, whereas literature turned secondary. Some of the most important works written in this period are: Resumen topográfico e histórico de Menorca (1784), commissioned by the Royal Academy of History; Ensayo Latino-Menorquín de los tres reynos vegetal, animal y mineral (1788); and Pesos y Medidas de Menorca y su correspondencia con los de Castilla. Notwithstanding, he also produced some literary books such as those edited in 1783: Ègloga de Tirsis i Filis, using a neoclassical style, and the tragicomedy Rosaura, following Baroque standards.

Third period

In 1791 he wrote several elegies for his wife, Joana Montanyès, who died in that year and marked the beginning of the third period in Ramis’ work with whom he had had two daughters. The year 1793, after his mother's (Caterina Ramis) death, marked the beginning of the third period in his work, when he focused on working to maintain the social status of his family. This is the reason why he took public positions including that of advisor of the Royal Heritage in 1802, judge of printers and bookstores in Menorca in 1805 and advisor in the commission of the Royal Tax Office in 1812. Even though his intellectual activity became secondary in this period, he continued writing several pieces of work, including burlesque and love poems as well as the work Els temps i paratges de Menorca en què és més gustós i saludable el Peix (1811).

Fourth period

This last period, which started in 1814, was a productive one, since he edited numerous history-related books: Alquerías de Menorca (1815), Situación de la Isla de Menorca (1816), Varones Ilustres de Menorca (1817), Antigüedades célticas de la isla de Menorca (1818, Celtic antiques on the island of Menorca) (which was the first archaeological treatise about the island and all the Spanish state), Alonsíada (1818, epic poem about the conquest of Menorca by the Catalan troops), and Historia civil y política de Menorca (1819).

== Historical context ==
By analysing of the literary background and the weak demography of the island, with only 16,000 inhabitants at the beginning of the century and with 31,000 towards the end, it is difficult to think about the flourishing of the Catalan Neoclassical literature in Menorca, drama in particular, but also about a wide range of topics Menorcan literature covered and its European perspective, which are not found in any other part of the country.

There is a coherent historical explanation for the flourishing of these and other characteristics that are found in 18th-century Menorcan culture and cannot be found in the rest of the Catalan culture of the period. The end of the war against Philip 5th of Spain resulted in a diversification in the political scenario of Europe. The annexation of the Roussillon to the French kingdom became permanent as opposite to the initial situation which started in 1659, and the Frenchisation exerted a deeper influence.

Menorca, was incorporated to the British crown in the Treaty of Utrecht (1713), after which it followed a peculiar trajectory. Under British rule and the short occupation as the result of the War of the seven years (1756 – 1763) it kept its political institutions. Throughout this period Catalan remained the official language, and even governor Sir Richard Kane spoke the language of Menorcan people. Moreover, four of the seventeen members of Societat Maonesa de Cultura were British and the number of schools teaching in the native language increased. In 1750 the first Menorcan printing press was imported from London, Menorcan economy became dynamic, and not only agriculture, stockbreeding and crafts flourished, but also the participation of the island in an international trade did so. Due to this economic activity, specially based in the new capital, Mahón, there was a rise of the commercial bourgeoisie, which was open to relationships with the rest of Europe. In this context, the sons of well-to-do families studied in the continent, mostly in French universities.

== See also ==
- Capture of Minorca (1798)
- Enlightenment in Spain
- List of governors of Menorca

== Bibliography ==
- «Joan Ramis». Web. Generalitat de Catalunya, 2012. [Juliol 2013].
- Alcoberro, Agustí «El primer conflicte global». Especial 1714. Monogràfic de la Revista Sàpiens [Barcelona], núm. 108, setembre 2011, p. 20-23. ISSN 1695-2014.
- Bagur, Joel; Salord, Josefina; Villeyra, Alex (coord.). Joan Ramis, un il·lustrat de la Menorca disputada. Maó: IES Joan Ramis i Ramis, 1996.
- Carbonell, Jordi. "Pròleg". En: Ramis, Joan. Lucrècia. Barcelona: Edicions 62, 1968.
- Comas, Antoni. "Joan Ramis". En: Història de la literatura catalana. Barcelona: Ariel, 1964.
- Fontanella, Francesc; Ramis, Joan. "Lucrècia i Rosaura o el més constant amor". En: Teatre barroc i neoclàssic. A cura de Maria Mercè Miró i Jordi Carbonell; pròleg de Giuseppe Grilli. Barcelona: Edicions 62: La Caixa, 1990. (MOLC).
- Gregory, Desmond. Minorca, the illusory prize: a history of the British occupations of Minorca. Associated University Presse, 1990, p. 24-25. ISBN 0838633897.
- Pons, B. (ed.). Antigüedades célticas de la isla de Menorca, by Joan Ramis i Ramis (1818). Menorca: Institut Menorquí d'Estudis, Consell Insular de Menorca, 2018.
- Pons, Antoni-Joan. Rosaura de Joan Ramis: més enllà del neoclassicisme? Joan Ramis i Josep Maria Quadrado: de la Il·lustració al Romanticisme. Barcelona: Publicacions de l'Abadia de Montserrat; Palma de Mallorca: UIB; Maó: IEM, 1999.
- Ramis i Ramis, Joan. Poesies burlesques i amoroses. Maó: Institut Menorquí d'Estudis, 1988.
- https://www.escriptors.cat/autors/ramisj/biografia Assosiació de les escriptors en llengua catalana, 2024.
