= Naveta =

Megalithic tomb

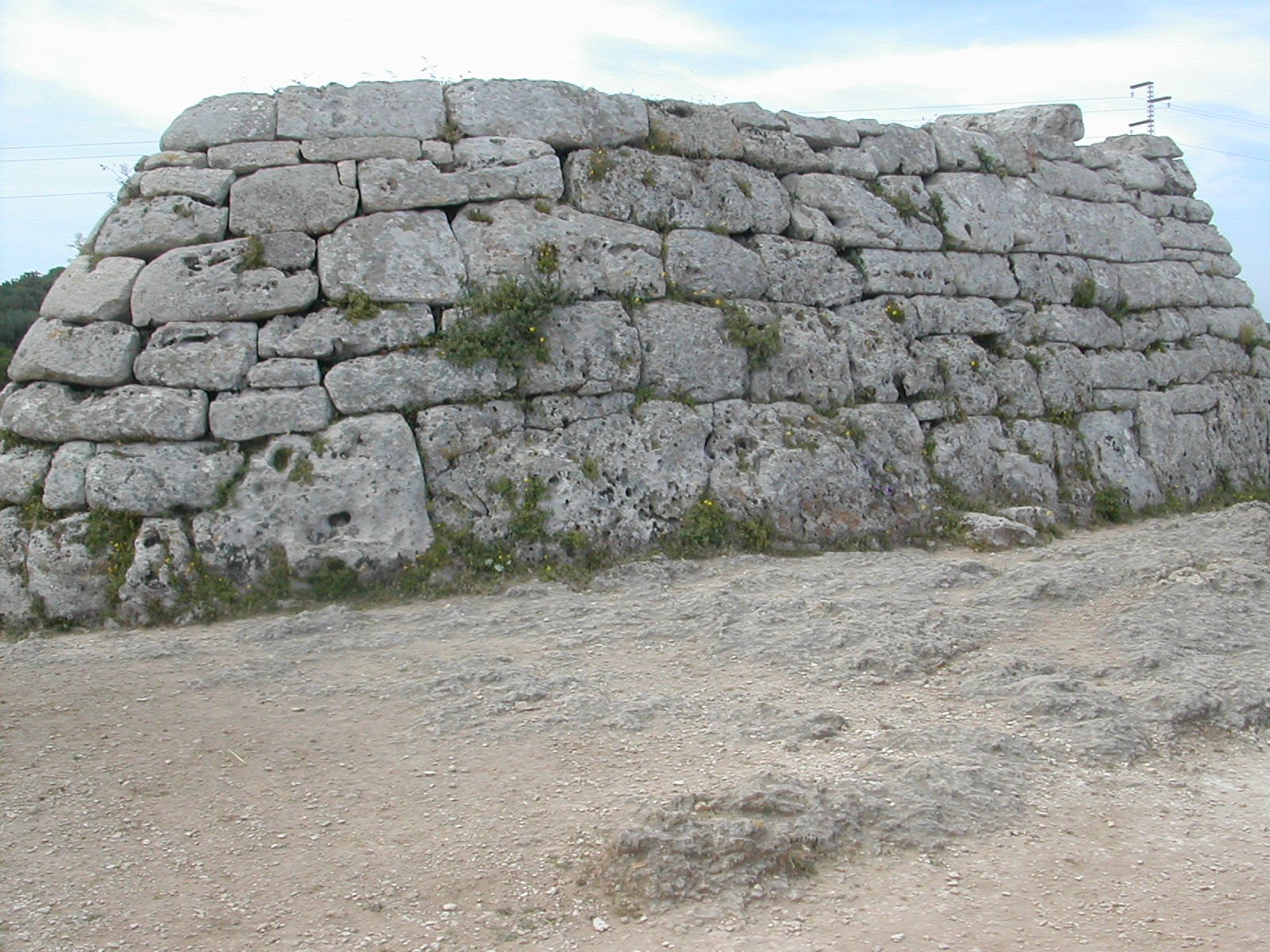
This is a naveta from the site of Naveta des Tudons found on the western end of Menorca

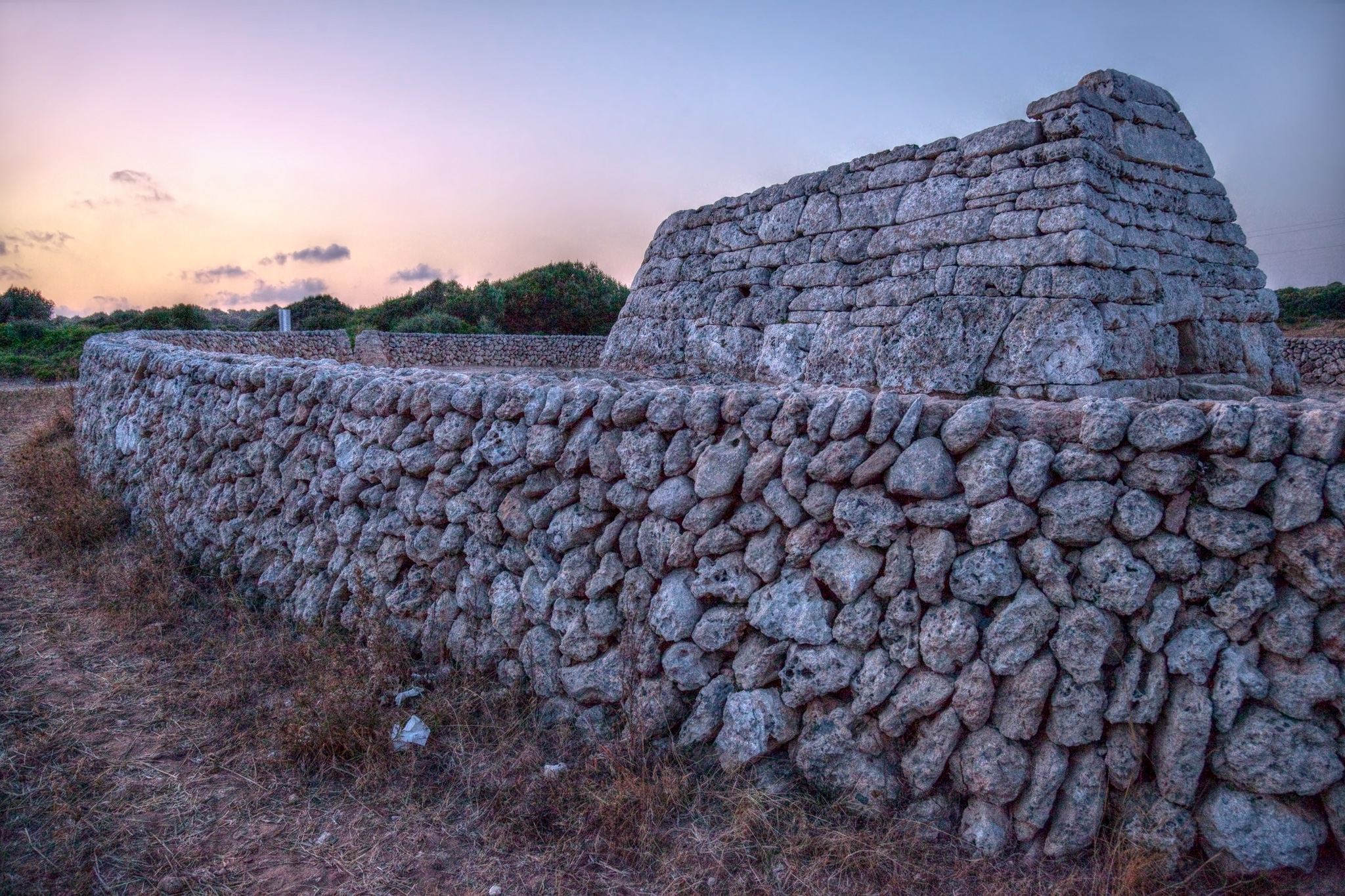
Naveta des Tudons at dawn, Menorca

A naveta (also known as funerary naveta or burial naveta) is a form of megalithic chamber tomb unique to the Balearic island of Menorca. They were built during the Bronze Age, between the Pre-Talayotic period and the beginning of the Talayotic period. Despite their resemblance to residential navetas, they served a very different function and do not share an entirely synchronous chronology.

The largest example is the Naveta d'Es Tudons which is around 4m high, 14m long and 6.4m wide.

The first author who wrote about these structures was Juan Ramis in his book Celtic antiquities on the island of Menorca, which was edited in 1818, it being the first book in the Spanish language entirely devoted to prehistory.

== Structures preceding the funerary navetas ==
In recent years, some researchers have proposed that the funerary navetas are an evolution of earlier funerary structures located in the southeastern area of the island—namely, the dolmens. However, this evolution is not direct, and what appear to be a series of intermediate buildings between the dolmen and the fully developed naveta have been documented. These include triple-walled tombs or proto-navetas, and circular-plan navetas.

The first of these construction types was documented in the early 21st century at the sites of Son Olivaret and Ses Arenes de Baix. Both structures are built around an oval-shaped central chamber, which is surrounded by three concentric rows of large stones. These would have served to support the earthen mound that covered the structure. These funerary monuments appear quite similar to dolmens, although the shape of the chamber and the entrance corridor mark a clear difference: in the case of Son Olivaret and Ses Arenes de Baix, no perforated slab has been found. Chronologically, they were used between 1700 and 1300 BCE, coinciding with the end of the dolmen tradition.

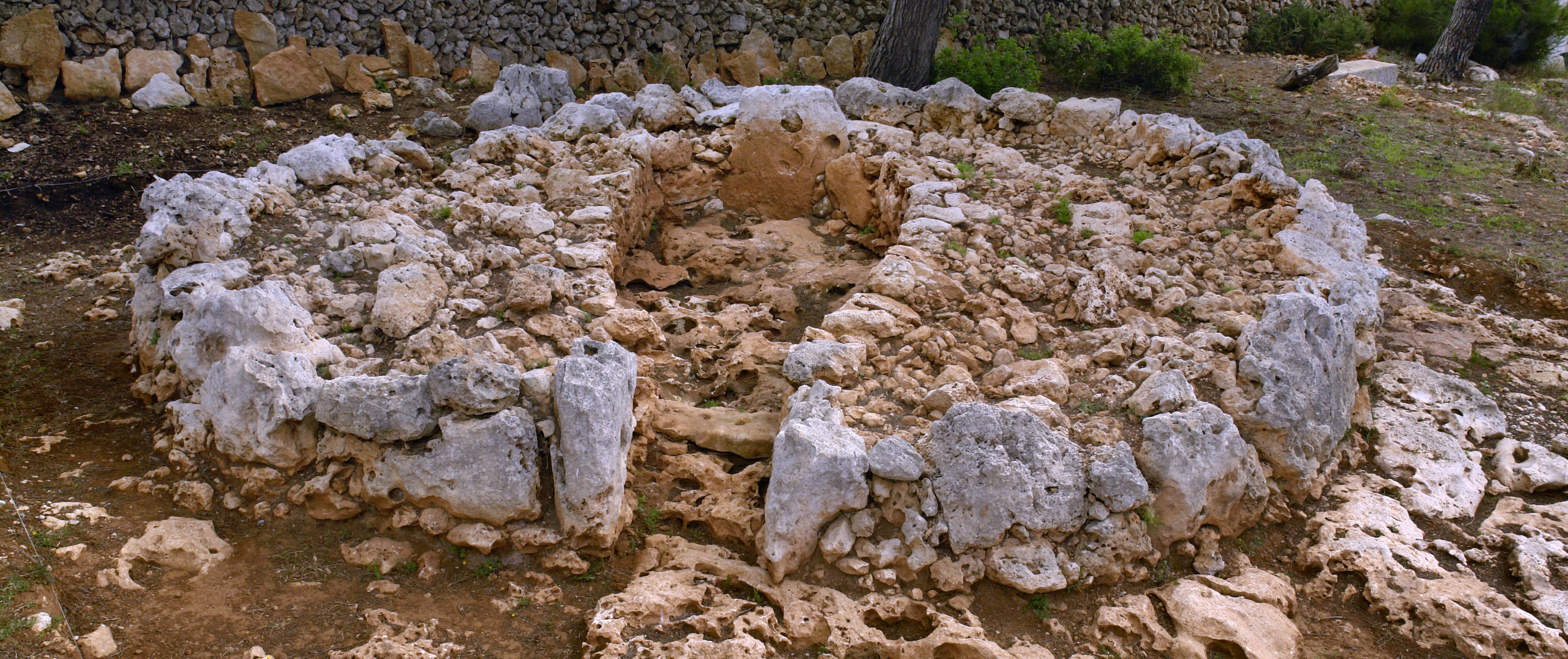
Triple-Walled Tomb of Son Olivaret (Ciutadella). Photo: Museum of Menorca

Circular-plan navetas also resemble dolmens; they feature a rectangular chamber and an entrance passage with a perforated slab that separates the chamber from the corridor. The main difference lies in the fact that, unlike dolmens which are covered by an earthen mound, these structures are covered with stones—a feature that makes the evolutionary link to funerary navetas more plausible. Some examples of this type of building include Biniac-l'Argentina, Torrellisar, and others.

== Funerary naveta ==
Whether or not their internal development followed the previously described models, the funerary naveta is the most monumental and uniquely Menorcan funerary monument, used between 1050 and 850 BCE.

It is a structure with varied typology: most are elongated in plan, like the Naveta des Tudons; some have two connected floors, while others have only one. Some feature an entrance corridor built with stone slabs, while in others, access is through a perforated slab—reminiscent of earlier dolmens. To date, archaeology cannot explain the reasons behind this typological diversity, but based on current dating, no clear chronological differences can be established.

The fact that archaeological interventions in these navetas were carried out using outdated methods, and that their visibility across the landscape has made them targets of looting, means that the information we have today about these structures—the individuals buried within them, the rituals performed, etc.—is incomplete and unclear.

Despite this lack of information, it is worth noting that a greater number of grave goods have been documented compared to earlier tombs, although there appears to be some continuity. These include triangular bone buttons, large quantities of pottery, awls, bracelets, knives, spearheads, and biconical beads.

The name naveta comes from its resemblance to an upside-down ship.

== Talayotic Menorca: UNESCO World Heritage ==
Talayotic Menorca is a site inscribed on the UNESCO World Heritage List in 2023. It consists of a series of archaeological sites that testify to an exceptional prehistoric island culture, characterized by unique cyclopean architecture. The island preserves exclusive monuments such as funerary navetas, circular houses, taula sanctuaries, and talayots, all of which remain in full harmony with the Menorcan landscape and its connection to the sky.

Menorca has one of the richest archaeological landscapes in the world, shaped by generations that have preserved the Talayotic legacy. It has the highest density of prehistoric sites per square meter on any island and serves as a symbol of its insular identity.

This area is divided into nine zones covering archaeological sites and associated landscapes, with a chronology ranging from the emergence of cyclopean construction around 1600 BCE to the Romanization in 123 BCE. The exceptional value of its monuments and landscapes led to its inscription on the UNESCO World Heritage List in 2023.
