= Cales Coves (village) =

Village in Balearic Islands, Spain

- Village
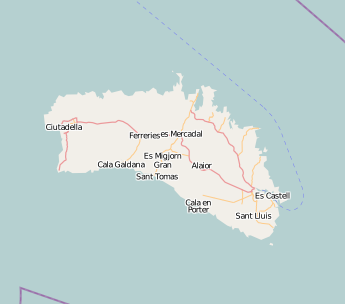
- Location in Menorca Cales Coves (Balearic Islands) Cales Coves (Spain)
- Coordinates: 39°52′39″N 4°9′50″E
- Country: Spain
- Autonomous Community: Balearic Islands
- Province: Balearic Islands
- Island: Menorca
- Municipality: Alaior

Area
  - Total: 0.49 km^{2} (0.19 sq mi)
- Elevation: 95 m (312 ft)

Population (2025)
  - Total: 91
  - Density: 190/km^{2} (480/sq mi)
- Time zone: UTC+1 (CET)
  - Summer (DST): UTC+2 (CEST (GMT +2))
- Postal code: 07730
- Area code: +34 (Spain) + 971 (Baleares)

Cales Coves is a village in the Alaior municipality of Menorca, Balearic Islands, Spain. It is located on the islands south coast and is located 2 kilometres East of Cala En Porter and is adjacent to Son Vitamina.

Alaior approved the tender for the construction of a sewage system in the urbanisation in May 2024. The works cost nearly 2 million Euros, and had been awaiting approval since 2018. The sewage system links up Son Vitamina and Cales Coves to the Cala en Porter sewage treatment plant.

The village is located a short distance from Cales Coves, a historic and touristic cove and beach, where the village name is taken from.

== History ==
The area around Cales Coves is ancient, and is home to the Santo Domingo and Biniadris Gorges, where the Biniadrís Cave is located. The village has existed for many years as a small hamlet consisting of a few old farmhouses. The village was developed into an urbanisation in the 20th Century after growing tourism to Menorca. The ancient Talayotic settlement of Lloc Nou des Fasser is in the village.

Just outside of the village is the Talayotic settlement of So na Caçana.
