= Cova de Biniadrís =

Cave in Balearic Islands, Spain

- Cave
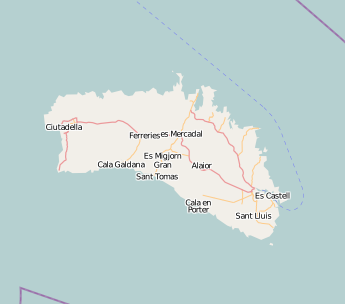
- Location in Menorca Cova de Biniadrís (Balearic Islands) Cova de Biniadrís (Spain)
- Coordinates: 39°52′33″N 4°8′58″E
- Country: Spain
- Autonomous Community: Balearic Islands
- Province: Balearic Islands
- Island: Menorca
- Municipality: Alaior
- Time zone: UTC+1 (CET)
  - Summer (DST): UTC+2 (CEST (GMT +2))
- Postal code: 07730
- Area code: +34 (Spain) + 971 (Baleares)

Cova de Biniadrís is a historic cave near Cala En Porter and Cales Coves in Alaior Municipality, Menorca, Balearic Islands, Spain.

The cave is located on the Eastern side of the Biniadrís Gorge. The cave was formerly associated with the necropolis at Cales Coves. The cave consists of one chamber of 18m², where human bone remains were discovered in 2013.

The cave was discovered in Mid 2013 by a group of speleologists, with the cave being excavated in 2015, discovering 940 human remains, two wooden combs, as well as ceramic. The cave is the fourth funerary cave to be discovered with intact material within in Menorca.

Radiocarbon dating has determined the cave was in use for at least seven centuries in the Bronze Age and in the Iron Age. The entrance to the cave is made of stone slabs of Cyclopean construction. Wooden structures were discovered in the rear of the cave, showing its good preservation.

The cave was excavated again in 2024 by a group of archaeologists from Fundació Rubió.
