= Lloc Nou des Fasser =

Archaeological site in Menorca, Spain

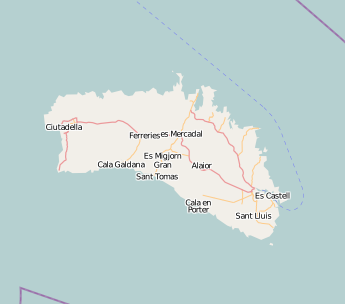
- Location within Minorca Location within Balearic Islands Location within Spain
- 39°52′41″N 4°9′46″E
- Type: Settlement
- Location: Cales Coves, Menorca, Spain
- Region: Balearic Islands

Lloc Nou des Fasser is an ancient Talaiot in Cales Coves, Alaior Municipality on Menorca, Balearic Islands, Spain.

The archaeological site is located in the Loc Nou des Fasser ravine. The talaiot is 17 metres and has an extent corridor.
