= So na Caçana =

Archaeological site in Menorca, Spain

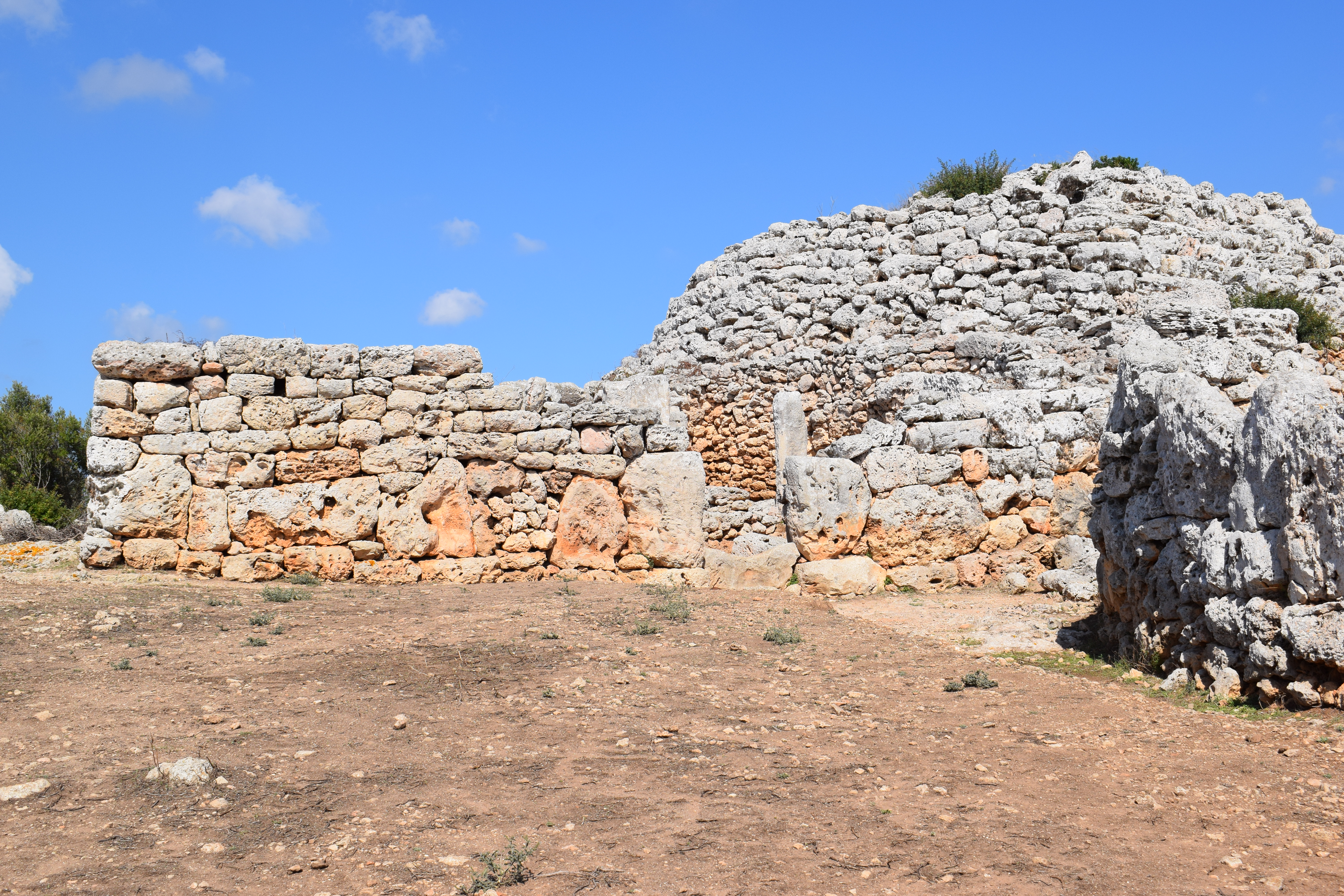
- Facade of the western Taula sanctuary at So na Caçana, Alaior, Minorca

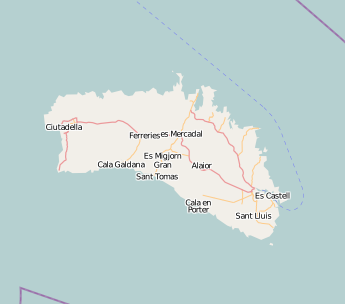
- Location within Minorca Location within Balearic Islands Location within Spain
- 39°52′41″N 4°9′46″E
- Type: Settlement
- Location: Menorca, Spain
- Region: Balearic Islands

History
- Built: 9th Century BC
- Abandoned: 4th Century AD

So na Caçana is a Talayotic complex located by the local road that runs between Alaior and Cala en Porter, on the island of Menorca. It is located around 6 km from Alaior and 2 km from Cala En Porter, nearby the Talayotic settlement of Torralba d'en Salort. It takes its name from the nearby farm, to which the archaeological site originally belonged. A team of archaeologists belonging to the Museum of Menorca carried out archaeological excavations between 1982 and 1987.

Around ten prehistoric buildings can be seen at the site, including two sanctuaries - these resemble a Taula enclosure, with a concave façade and an apse, as well as several possible Talayotic houses and a Hypogeum.

It is thought that the hypogeum underneath another building was constructed around 1500 BC, during the Pre-Talayotic period.

The sanctuary lost its religion function around 200 BC, but the site was later used as a habitation area until the 4th Century. Radiocarbon dating of charcoal samples from the buildings has produced a date range of the 9th century BC. A small Islamic cemetery was discovered near the car park in 2013.

Lluís Plantalamor, who directed the archaeological excavations at the site in the 1980s, proposed that the settlement may have been a religious centre linked to the other towns on this part of the island.

The site is one of the 32 prehistoric sites on Menorca that forms part of the Talayotic Menorca world heritage site in UNESCO.

A small building nearby the talaiot may have been a workshop, a burn marks suggest. - the building was probably used during Roman occupation.

== Heritage listing ==
So na Caçana is protected as an archaeological monument, and is part of UNESCO Talayotic Menorca heritage site.

== Gallery ==
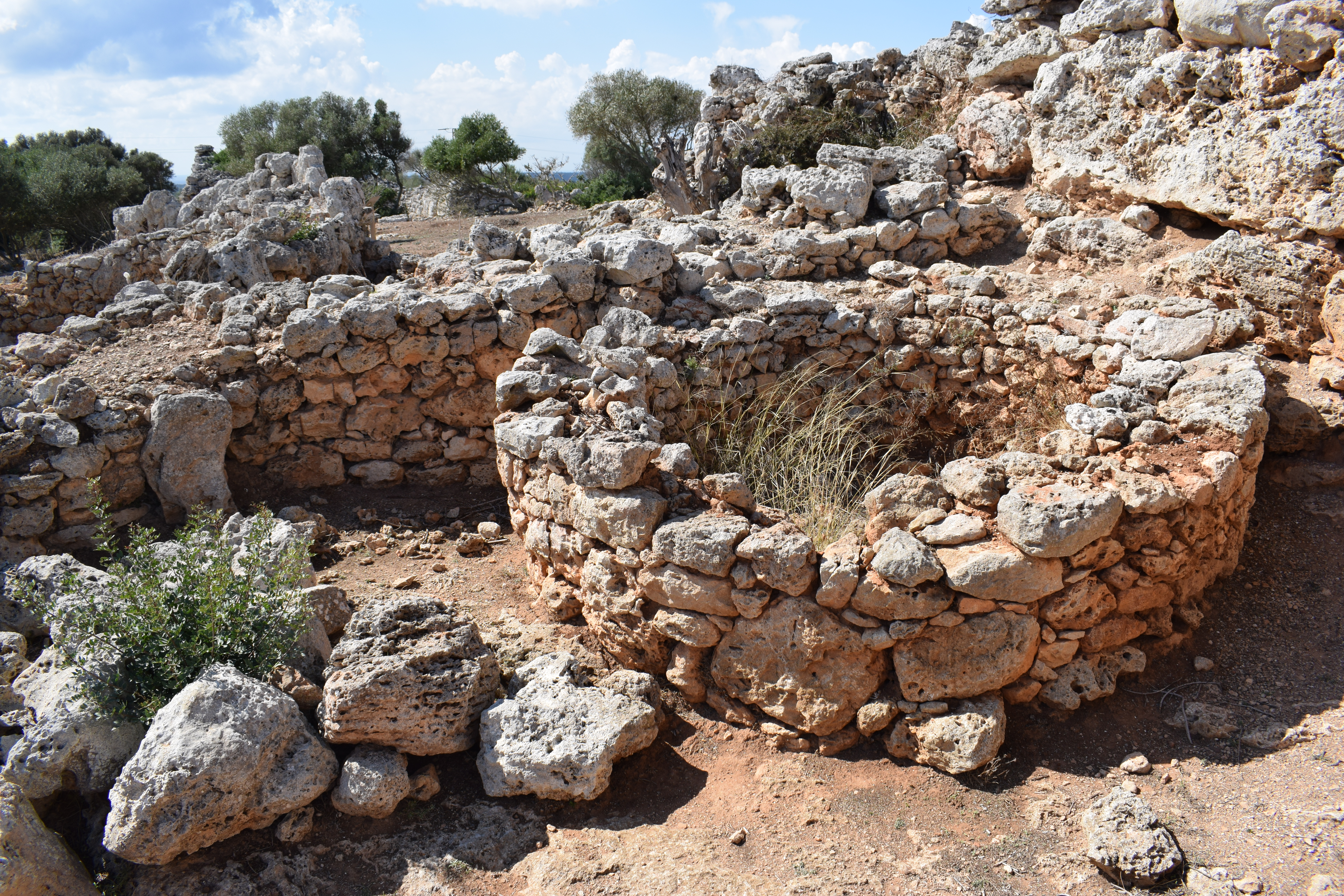
Ruins of a fireplace.

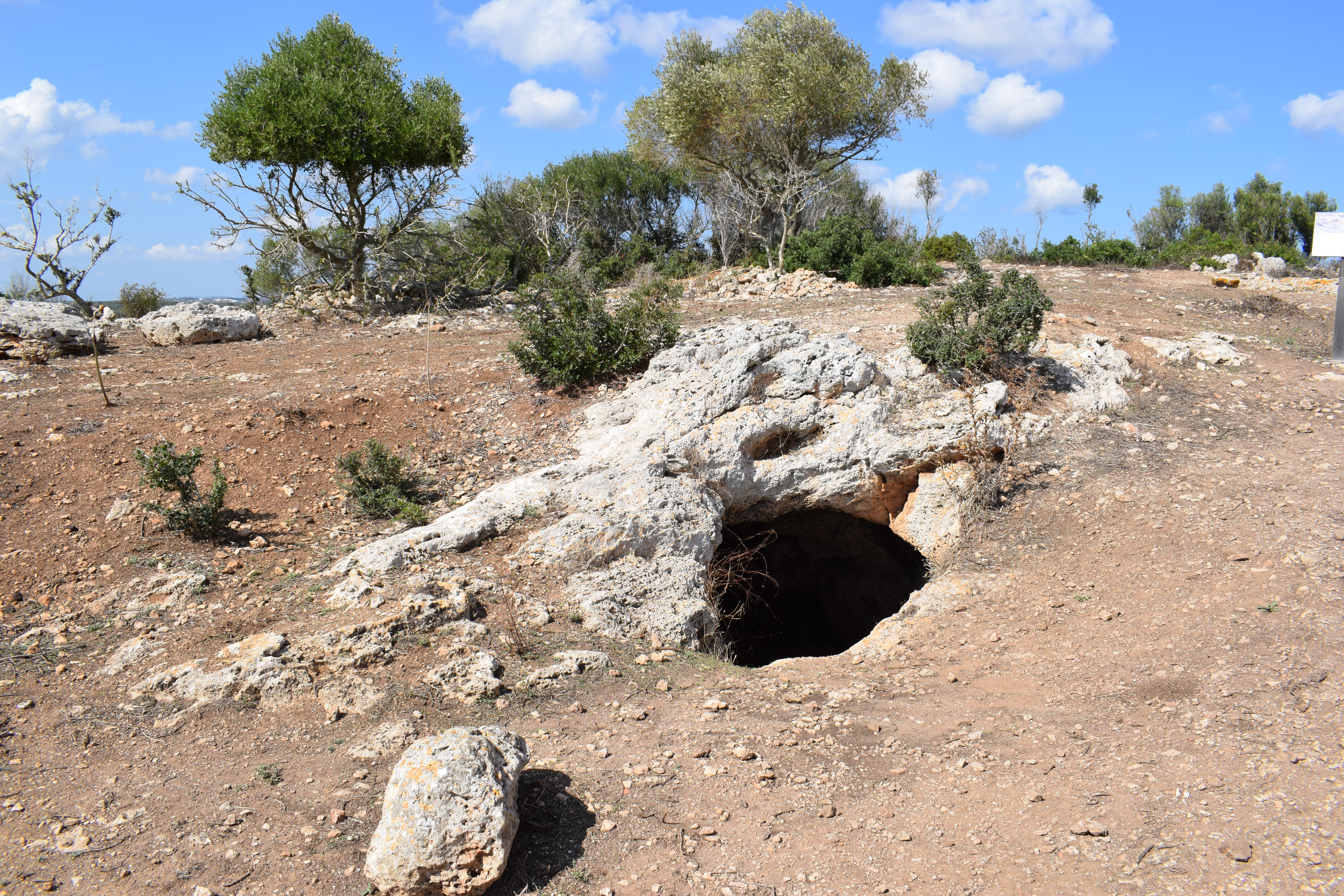
Hypogeum access tunnel

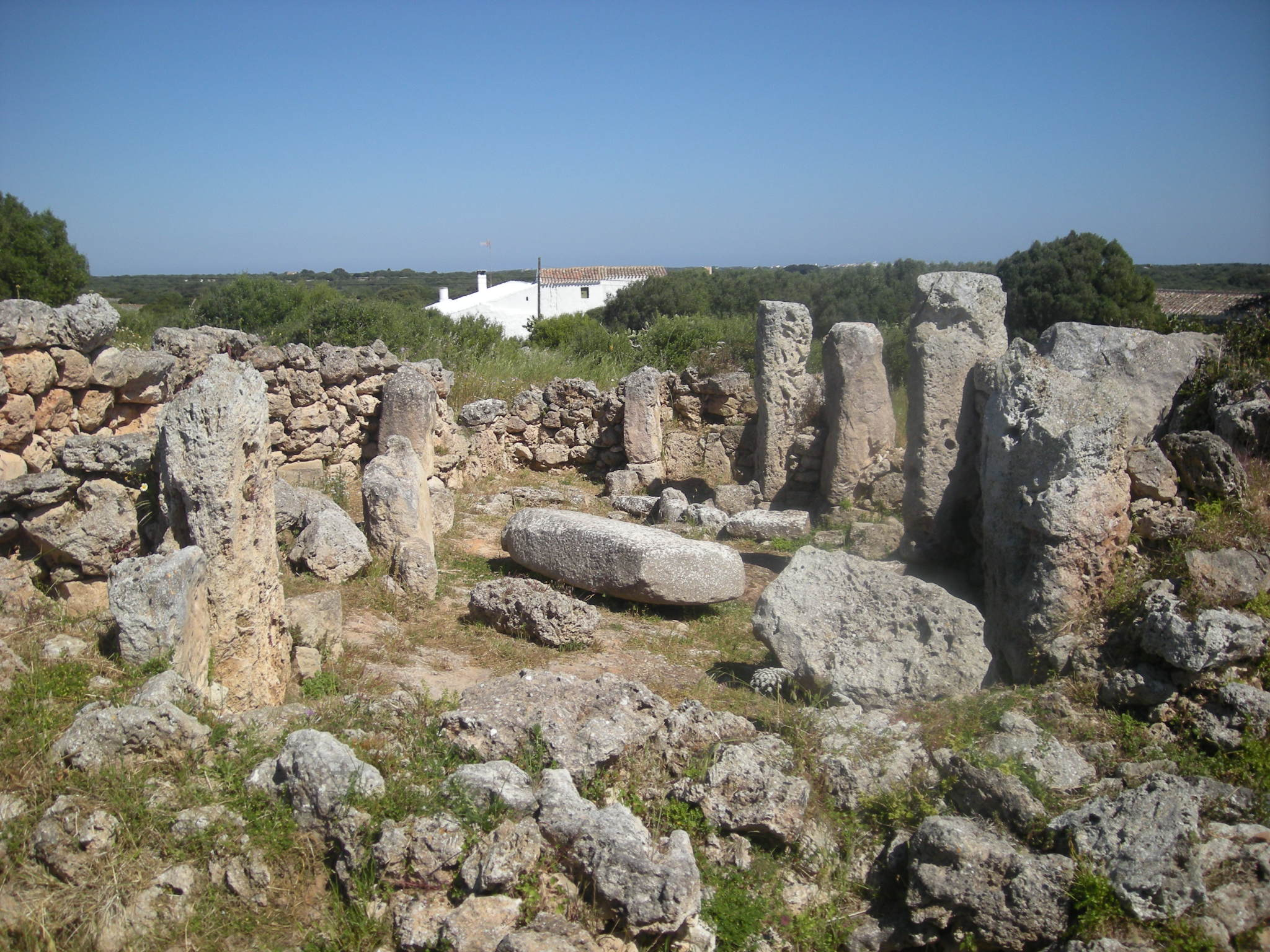
Eastern Taula Sanctuary

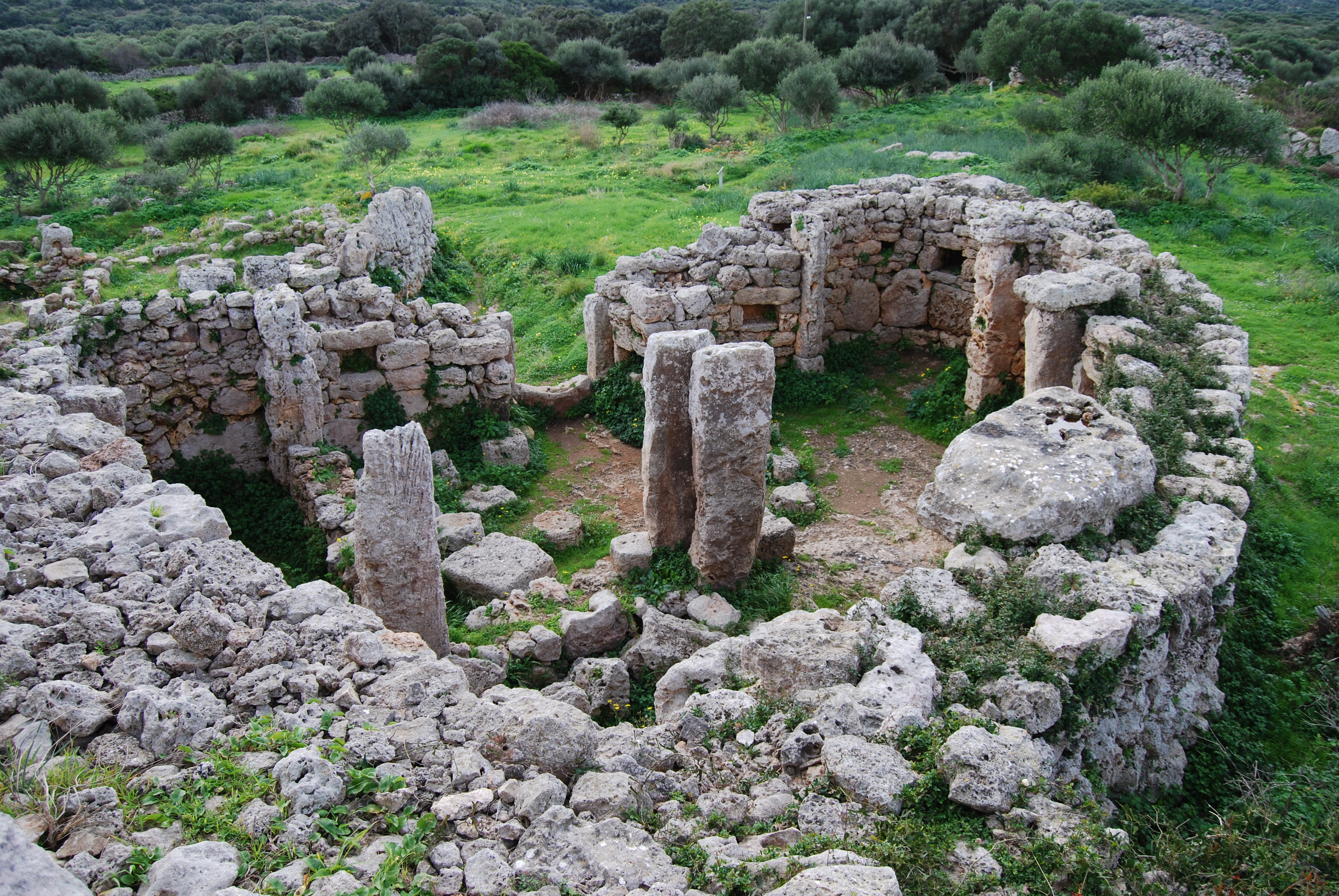
Western Taula Sanctuary

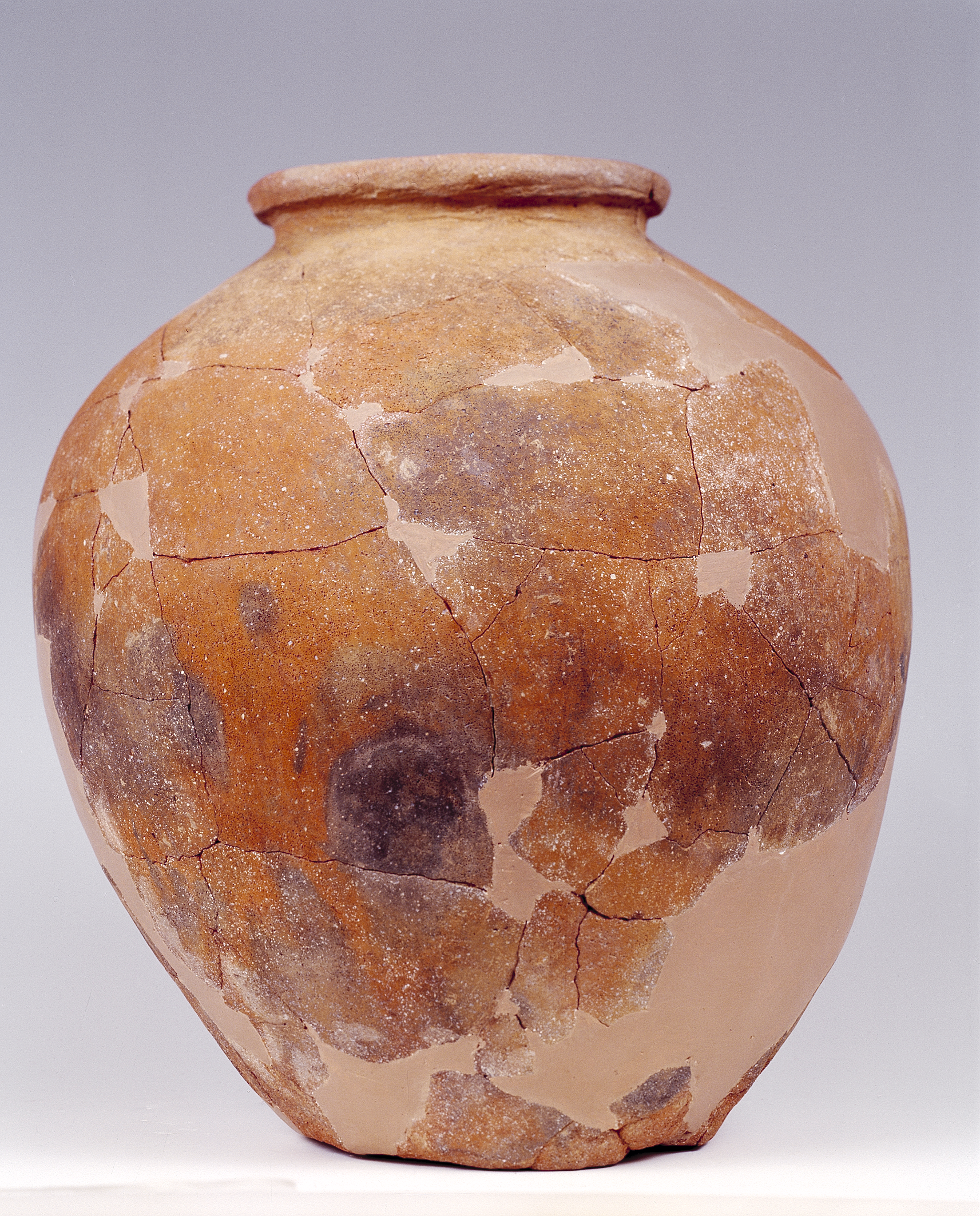
Ceramics from the site in the Museum of Menorca

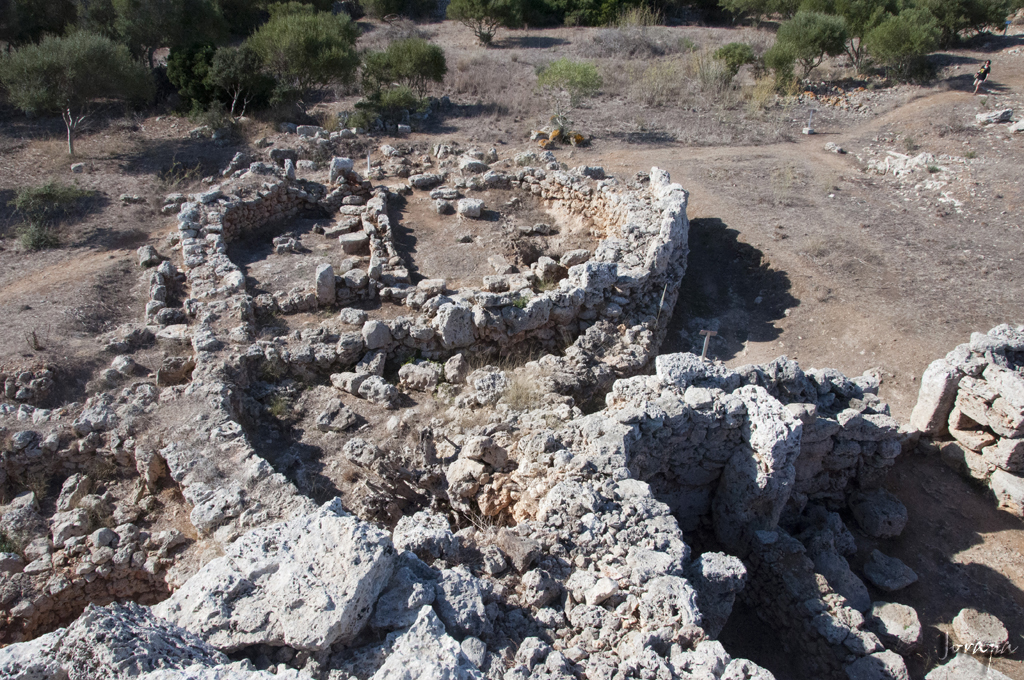
Remains of a roundhouse

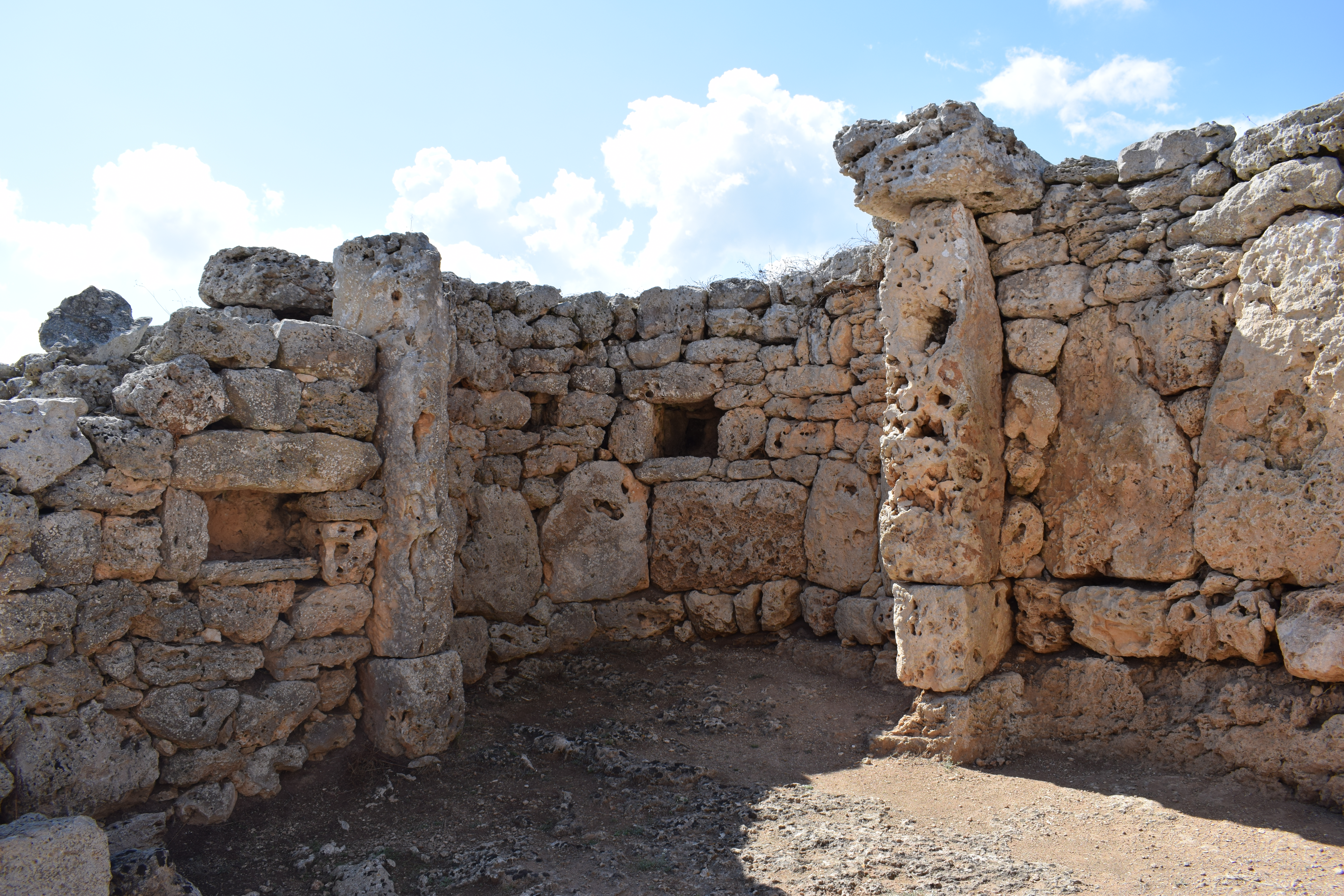
Niches and pillars in the Western sanctuary

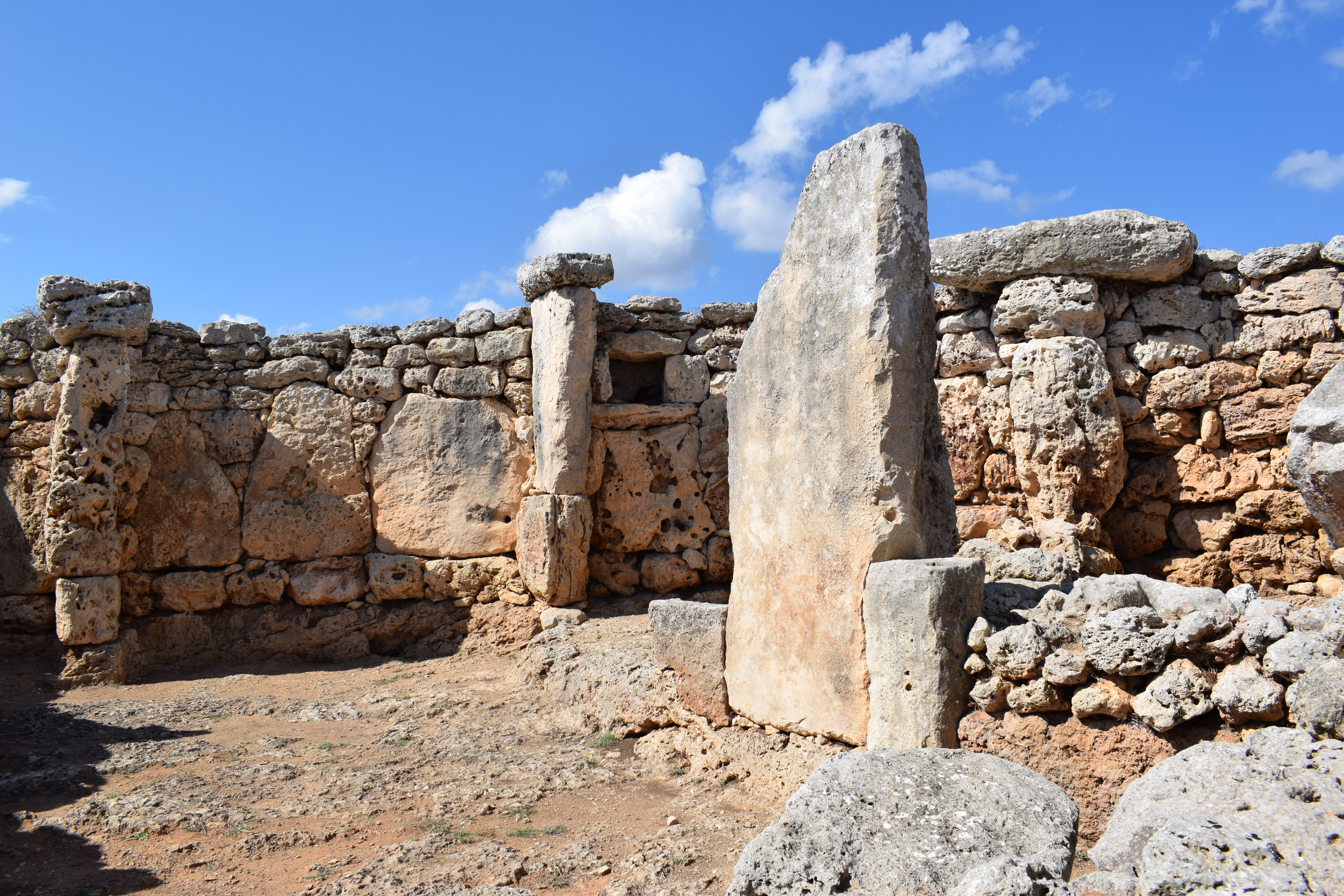
Taula within the Western sanctuary

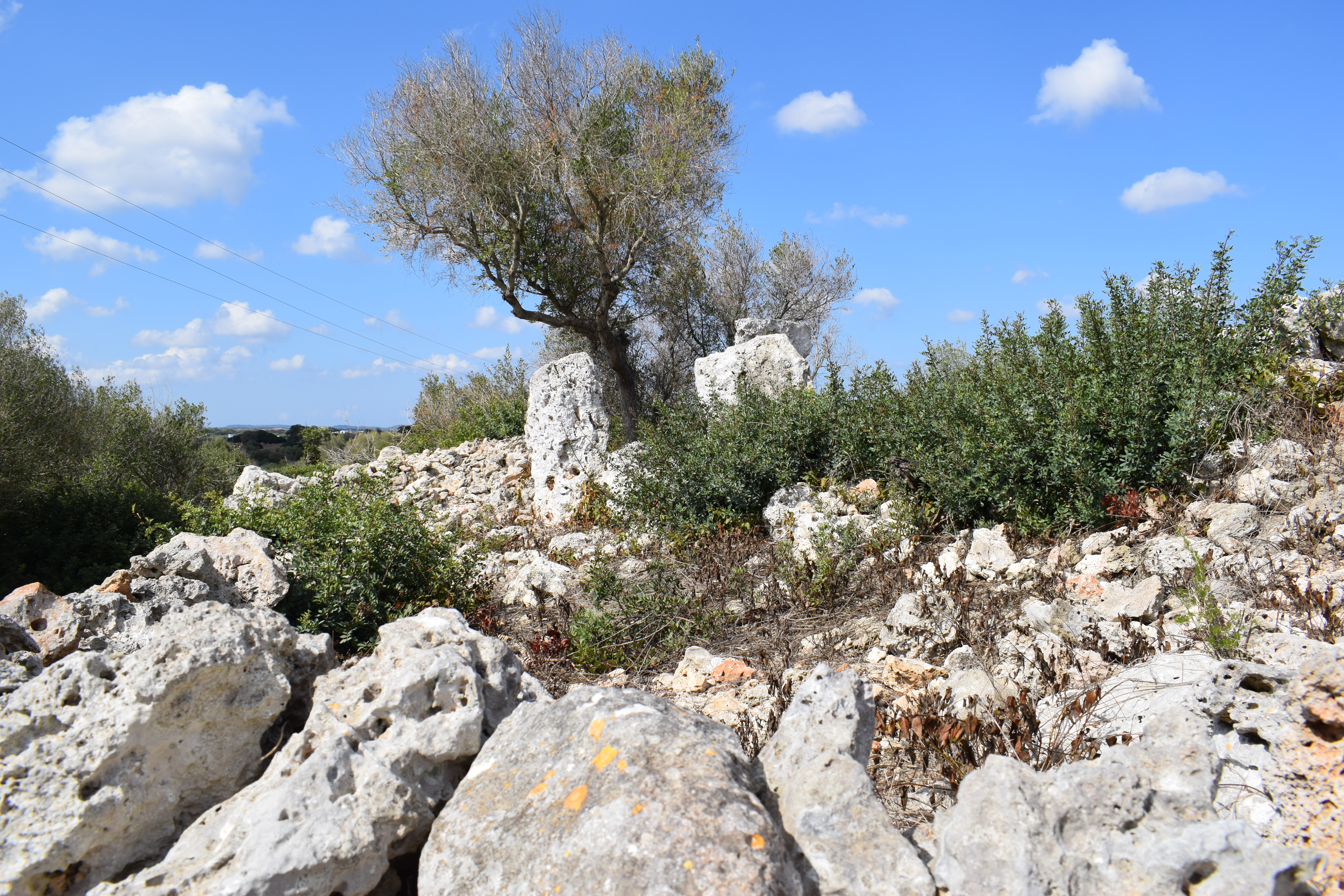
Roundhouse remains
