= Son Rotger =

Archaeological site in Menorca, Spain

- Prehistoric Settlement
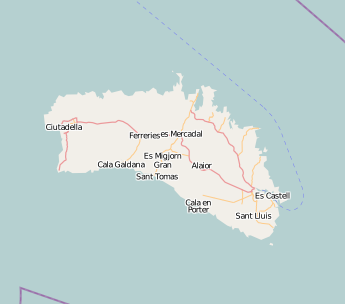
- Location in Menorca Son Rotger (Balearic Islands) Son Rotger (Spain)
- Coordinates: 39°52′53″N 4°8′23″E
- Country: Spain
- Autonomous Community: Balearic Islands
- Province: Balearic Islands
- Island: Menorca
- Municipality: Alaior

Area
  - Total: 0.01 km^{2} (0.0039 sq mi)
- Elevation: 75 m (246 ft)

Population (2025)
  - Total: 4
  - Density: 400/km^{2} (1,000/sq mi)
- Time zone: UTC+1 (CET)
  - Summer (DST): UTC+2 (CEST (GMT +2))
- Postal code: 07730
- Area code: +34 (Spain) + 971 (Baleares)

Son Rotger is a Talayotic settlement near Cala En Porter in the Alaior Municipality, Menorca, Balearic Islands, Spain.

The ancient settlement consists of a Talaiot and a headless Taula.
