= Talayotic settlement of Torrellisar =

Settlement in Menorca, Spain

The settlement of Torrellisar (Alayor, Menorca) is highly altered due to the farming activities that have taken place in the area during the past few centuries since it was abandoned. Despite this, several remains can still be seen, such as its taula monument. The site is located near the road that connects Alayor and Cala en Porter.

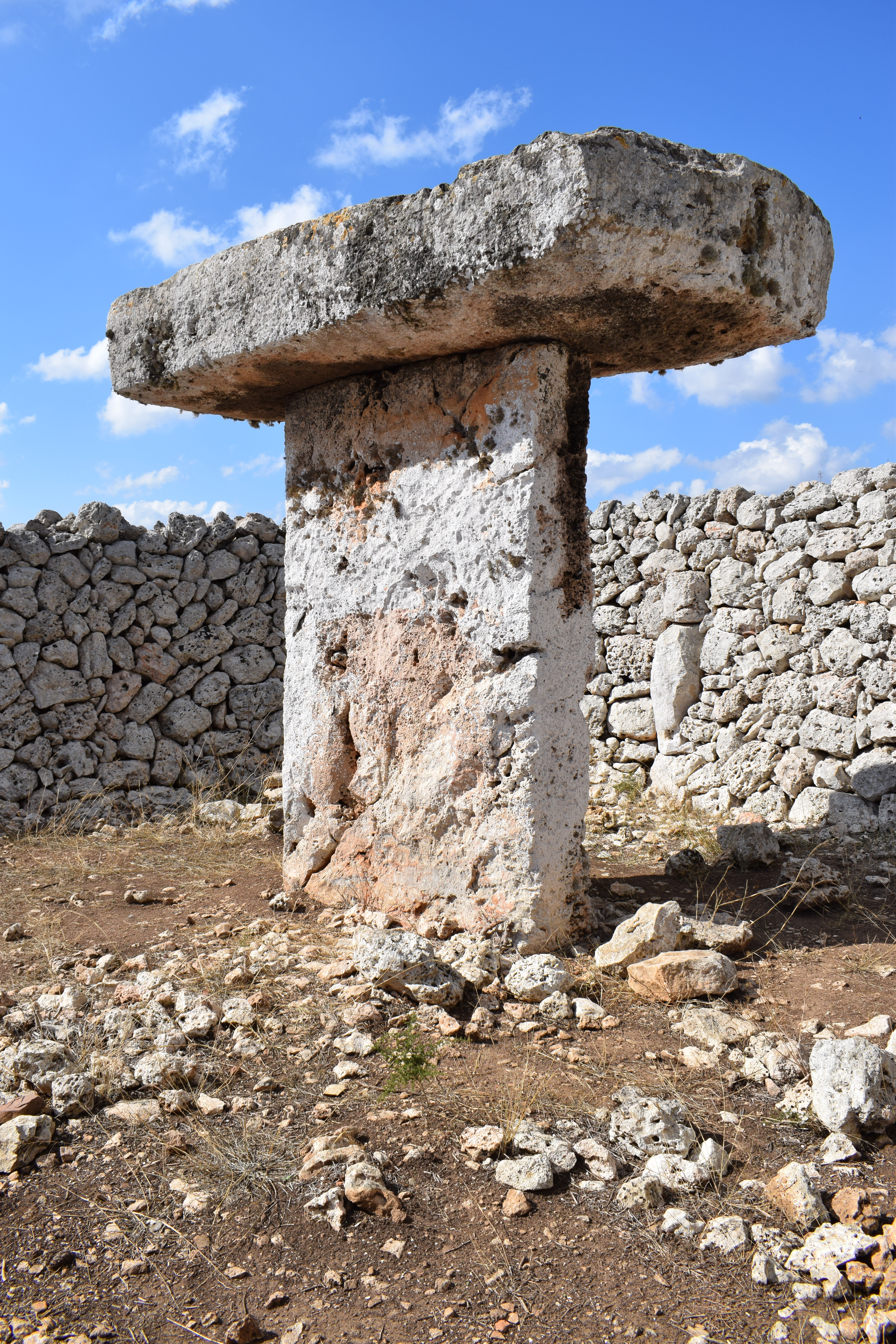
View of the taula of Torrellisar

The taula enclosure is also quite altered, since it has a modern dry stone wall built with small-sized stones whose function is indeterminate. However, it is an interesting element on site as it is a good example of Minorcan ethnological architecture. This wall has six original pilasters embedded into it and an entrance followed by a corridor which is covered by stone slabs, measuring 3 x 1,20 meters. The precinct formed by this wall has a circular layout measuring 8,7 meters in diameter. The taula is in a good state of preservation and its visible part is 2,59 meters high.

Archaeological excavations have determined that taula enclosures were religious buildings where rituals including the consumption of meat and wine were carried out during the Late Talayotic period, roughly between 500 BC and Roman times. There is no information about this taula enclosure since it has never been excavated.

The settlement also has the remains of two talayots, one of them with a possible inner chamber, which are hidden behind modern constructions. The function of talayos, which are the large truncate cone-shaped constructions that give the name to the Talayotic culture, is still unclear. The site also has other structures scattered throughout the archaeological area.

Chronology: from the Early Talayotic period (Late Bronze Age) to the Late Talayotic Period (Iron Age). Reused in contemporary times.

== Bibliography ==
- García Argüelles, A.; López, A.; Vado, J. M. (1994) Aproximación a la ocupación del territorio a la Antigüedad. El término municipal de Alaior. Instituto Menorquín de Estudios.
- Hochsieder, P. and Knösel, D. (1995) Las tablas de Menorca. Un estudio arqueoastronòmic. Trabajos del Museo de Menorca, 14. Ladrillo.
- Mascaró Pasarius, J. (1968) Las taulas. Testimonio de la fe religiosa y de la capacidad creadora de los paleomenorquines. Atendéis de Mahón.
- Plantalamor, Ll. (1991) La arquitectura prehistórica y protohistórica de Menorca y su marco cultural. Cultura del Gobierno Balear.
