= Romanization in Menorca =

The Romanization of Menorca refers to the process that involved the Roman military occupation, colonization, and the gradual acculturation of the indigenous Talayotic population, which, as a result, would lead to the definitive extinction of their culture as a distinct entity.

== Occupation and colonization ==
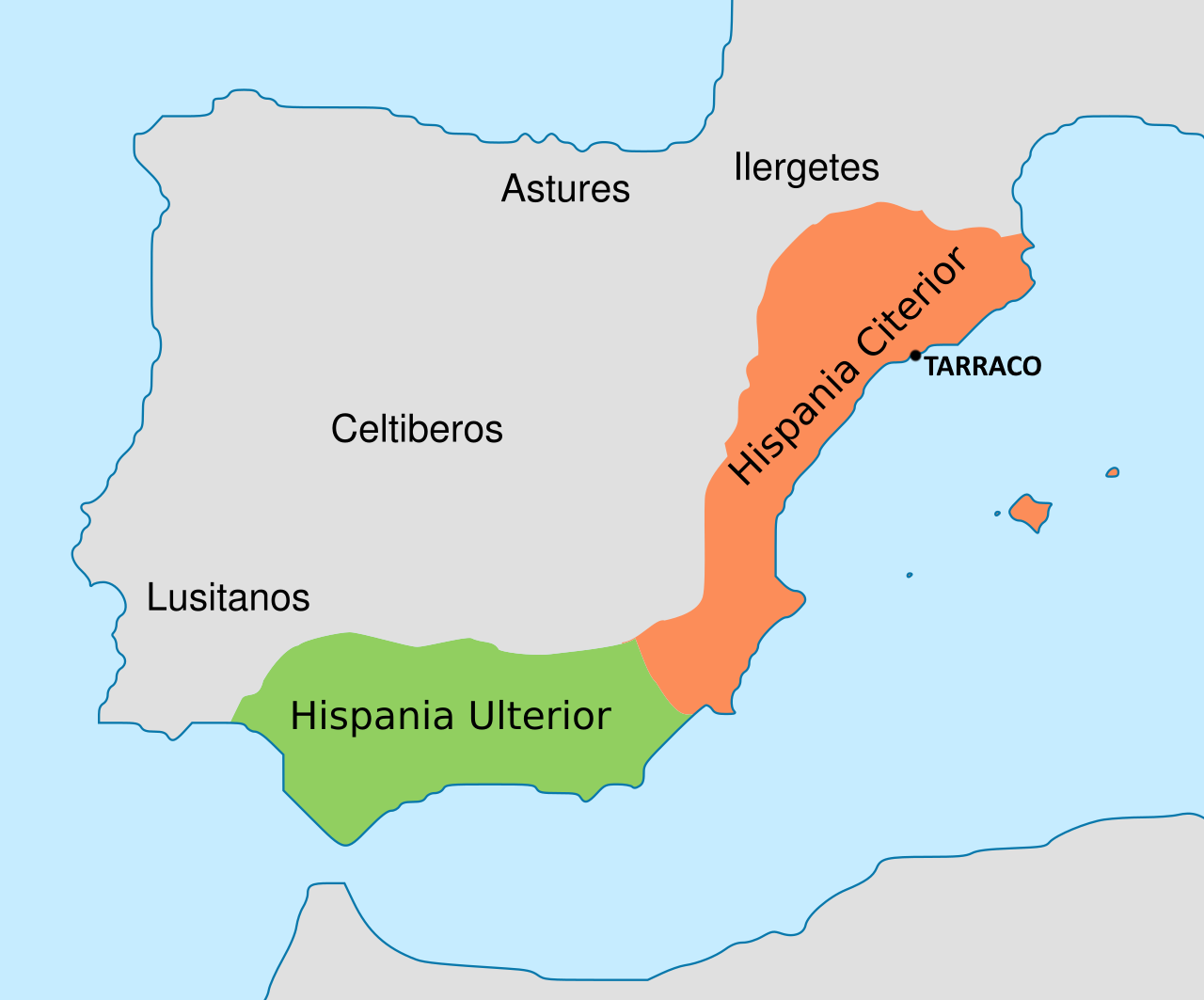
Hispania Citerior

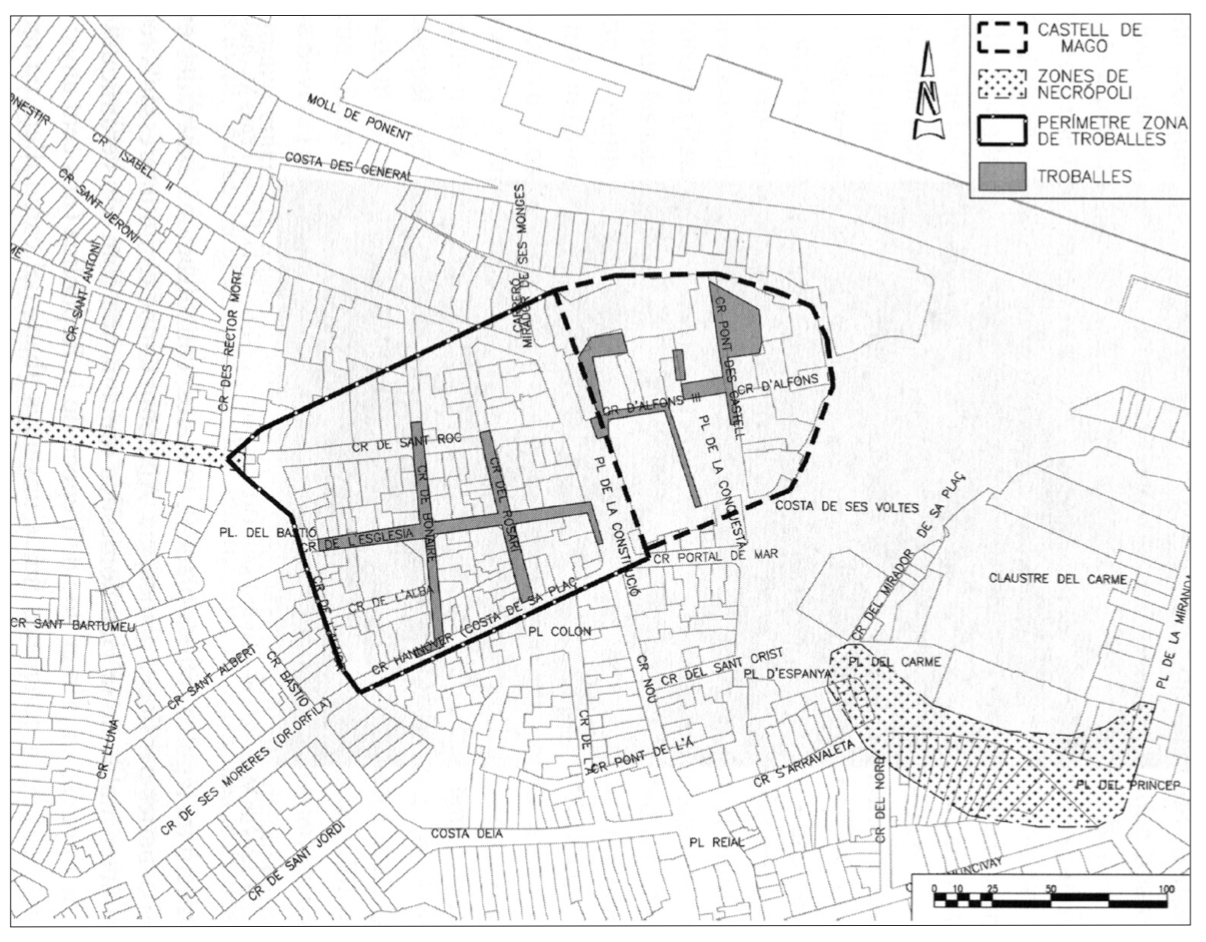
Expansion of Maga Romana (según GÓMEZ, M.; GARRIDO, E. (2013). Soporte de escultura con decoración vegetal procedente del fórum de Mago (Mahón, Menorca). Pyrenae, 44, núm. 2 (2013).)

Quinto Cecilio Metelo was the leader of the Roman fleet responsible for the occupation of the Balearic Islands. It took him two years (until 121 BCE) to pacify the islands and establish the foundations of Roman administration. Initially, the influx of colonists was scarce, and the Romans took advantage of the former Punic settlements, such as Iammona (modern-day Ciudadela) and Magona.

It is clear that the positive relations the indigenous people had with the Phoenician world had consequences, as the Roman civitates in Menorca were reduced to the status of civitas stipendiaria, or tribute-paying cities. This meant they were subjected to a harsher fiscal regime. Additionally, a military port, Sanisera, was founded at the present-day Puerto de Sanitja to prevent pirates from settling on the northern coast. In contrast, the belligerence of the Talayotic people in Mallorca toward the Carthaginians, coupled with their continued military support for Roman troops, led Rome to grant more privileges and send more colonists to the cities they founded on the island.

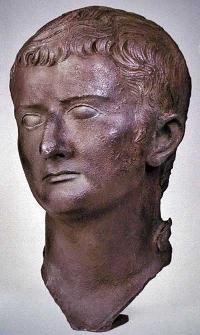
Bust of Emperor Tiberius found in Mago (Mahón).

In any case, in 123 BCE, Menorca (and the Balearic archipelago) became part of the Hispania Citerior with respect to its administration and taxation. In 13 BCE, Augustus reorganized the provincial structure of Hispania, establishing three provincial units: Bética, Lusitania, and Tarraconense, to which the Balearic Islands (insulae Baleares) belonged. However, the Roman provincial administration faced challenges due to issues related to insularity, particularly during the winter when navigational conditions were harsh, and the Mediterranean Sea became nearly impassable, creating a mare clausum (closed sea).

== Resources and Economic Exploitation ==
The Talayotic origin and the Phoenician-Punic influence of the Roman settlements, as well as the paleobotanical data, indicate the preexistence of a cereal culture in occupied Menorca. Certain resources were known and used by the Roman world, such as the sea onion (Urginea maritima), abundant in Menorca and generally in the islands, which was used to kill rats and as medicine. Snails (a Balearic variety that lives in holes), honey, and hares were also traded.

== Settlement ==
Roman agricultural exploitation techniques coexist with traditional methods of resource use. Post-Talayotic settlements and Roman exploitation sites are juxtaposed, as can be seen in the Algaiarens area, where the settlement of Es Pujol de sa Taula is located just 450 meters away from a traditional Roman exploitation. There is also the collapse of the indigenous centers of Punic-Ebusitan trade, as the Roman conquest led to places like Cales Coves being considered by Roman fiscal authorities as irregular or smuggling trade sites.

The Romans constructed a road that connected the two main civitates (current Mahón and Ciudadela, which they called Mago and Iammo).

== Epigraphic inscriptions ==
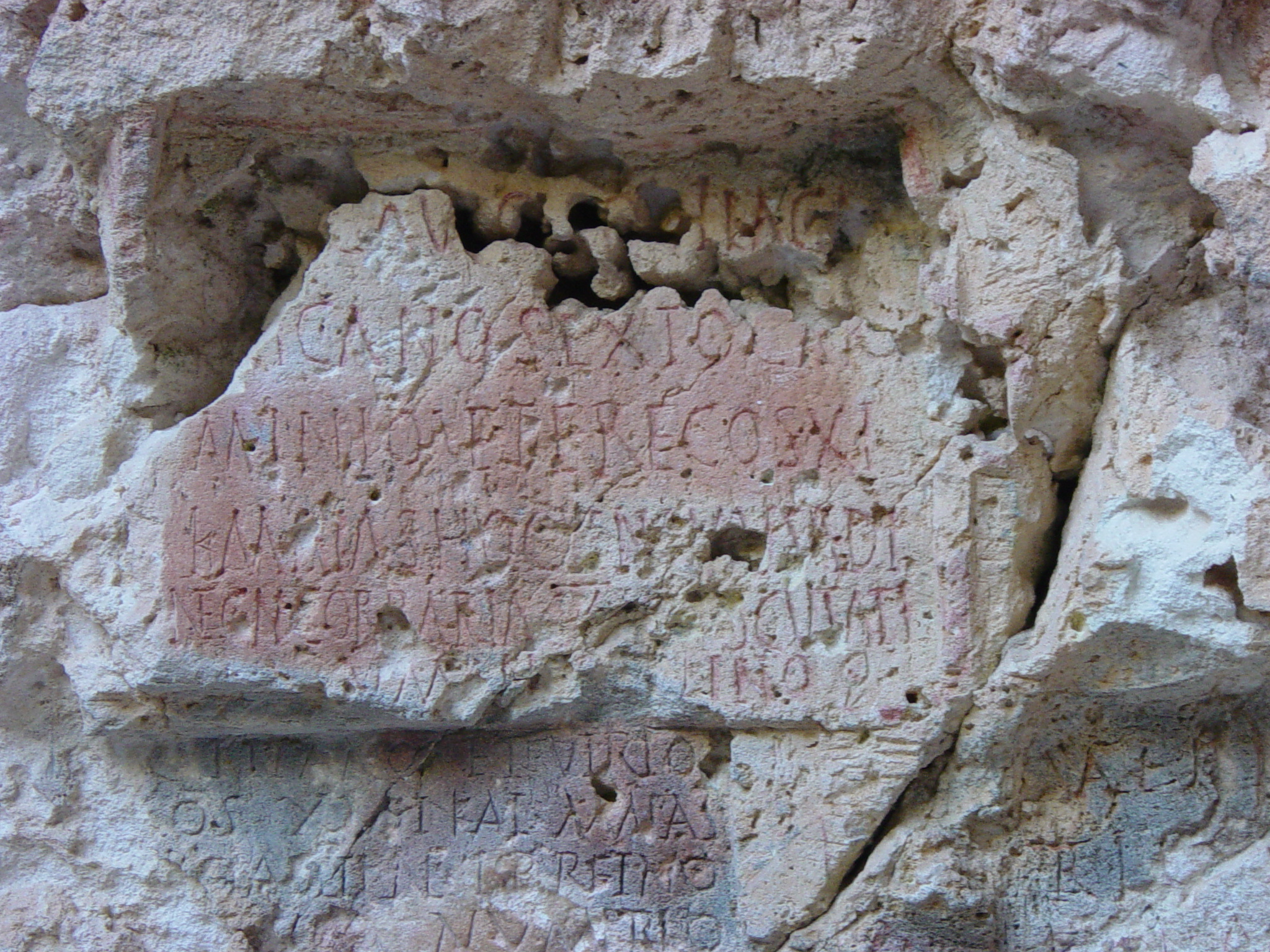
Epigraphic inscription of Calescoves (Menorca).

The epigraphs from Mahón, Ciudadela, and Sanitja are significant as they inform us of the legal status of these settlements as cities, as well as the names of some prominent individuals:

L·FABIO·L·F / QVIR / FABVLLO / AED·IIVIR.III / FLAMINI·DIVOR / AVG·R·P·MAG / OB MVLTA·EIVS / MERITA TR:

To Lucius Fabius Fabulo, son of Lucius, of the Quirina tribe, aedile, duumvir three times, flamen of the gods, augustal. The Republic of Mago, for his many merits. (Inscription documented in Mahón).

There are other inscriptions scattered across the island, with notable ones found in the Cova Diodorus of the Talayotic settlement of Torrellafuda, as well as other inscriptions in the cities of Mago, Iamo, and Sanisera.
