= Cova d'en Xoroi =

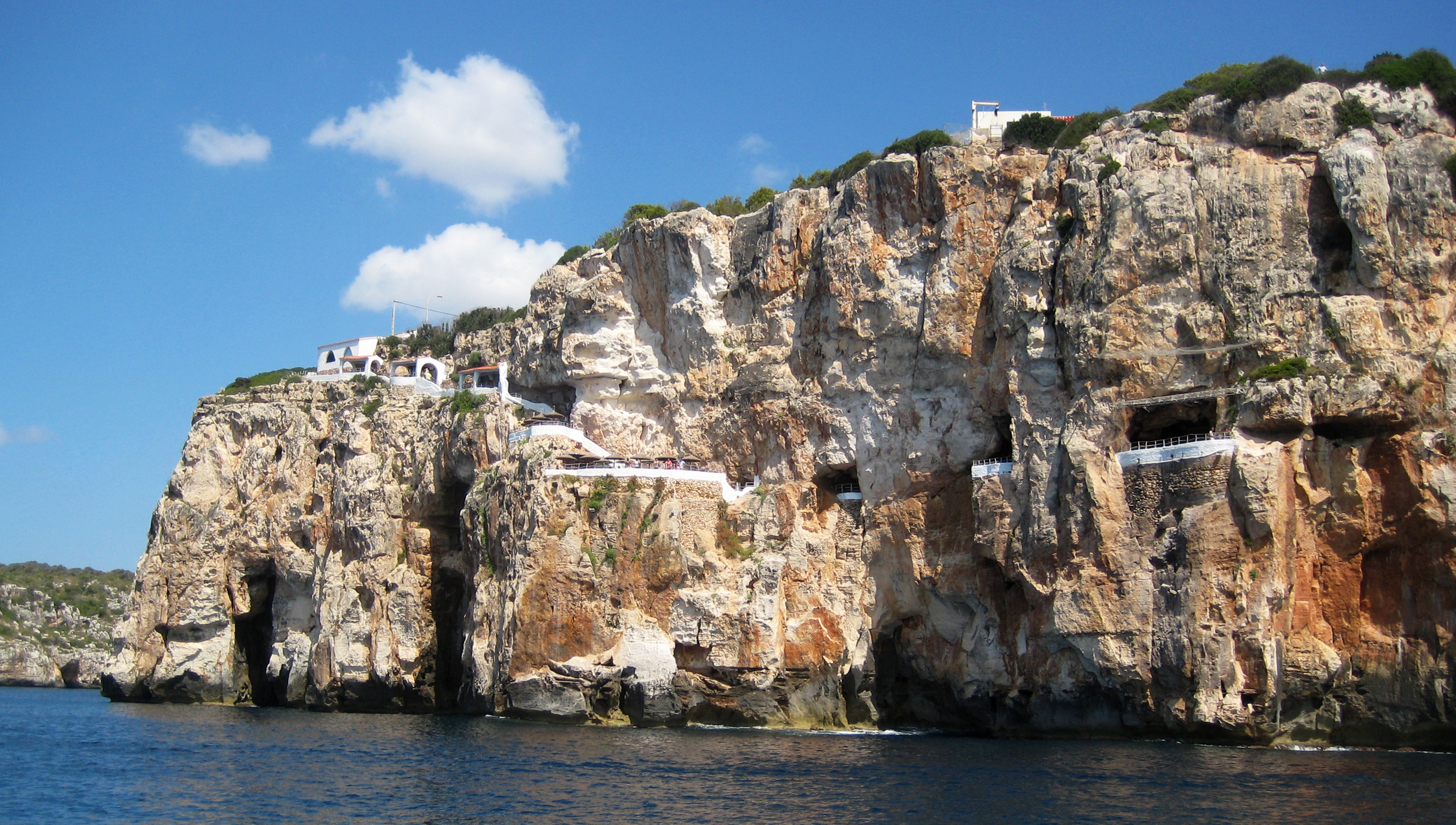
- Cova d'en Xoroi from the sea

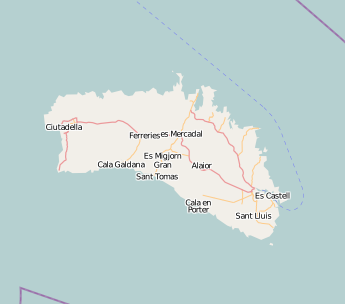
- Location within Minorca Location within Spain
- 39°51′56″N 4°07′57″E
- Location: Cala en Porter, Alaior, Menorca, Spain

The Cova d'en Xoroi is a natural cave in the village of Cala en Porter on the island of Menorca, Spain.

The cave is currently a bar and nightclub, and is located on the cliffs overlooking the Mediterranean Sea. Openings in the rock allow you to see Mallorca on the horizon.

== History ==
The legend says that during Islamic rule, a Moor called Xoroi (who was shipwrecked on the island) kidnapped a young woman from a country house near Alaior who was due to be married. She was taken to the cave by Xoroi. After many years, during a snowstorm, his footprints allowed the townspeople of Alaior to reach the cave, where they found them along with three children. Xoroi and one son jumped off the cliff, while the young woman and two children were taken back to Alaior.

== Gallery ==
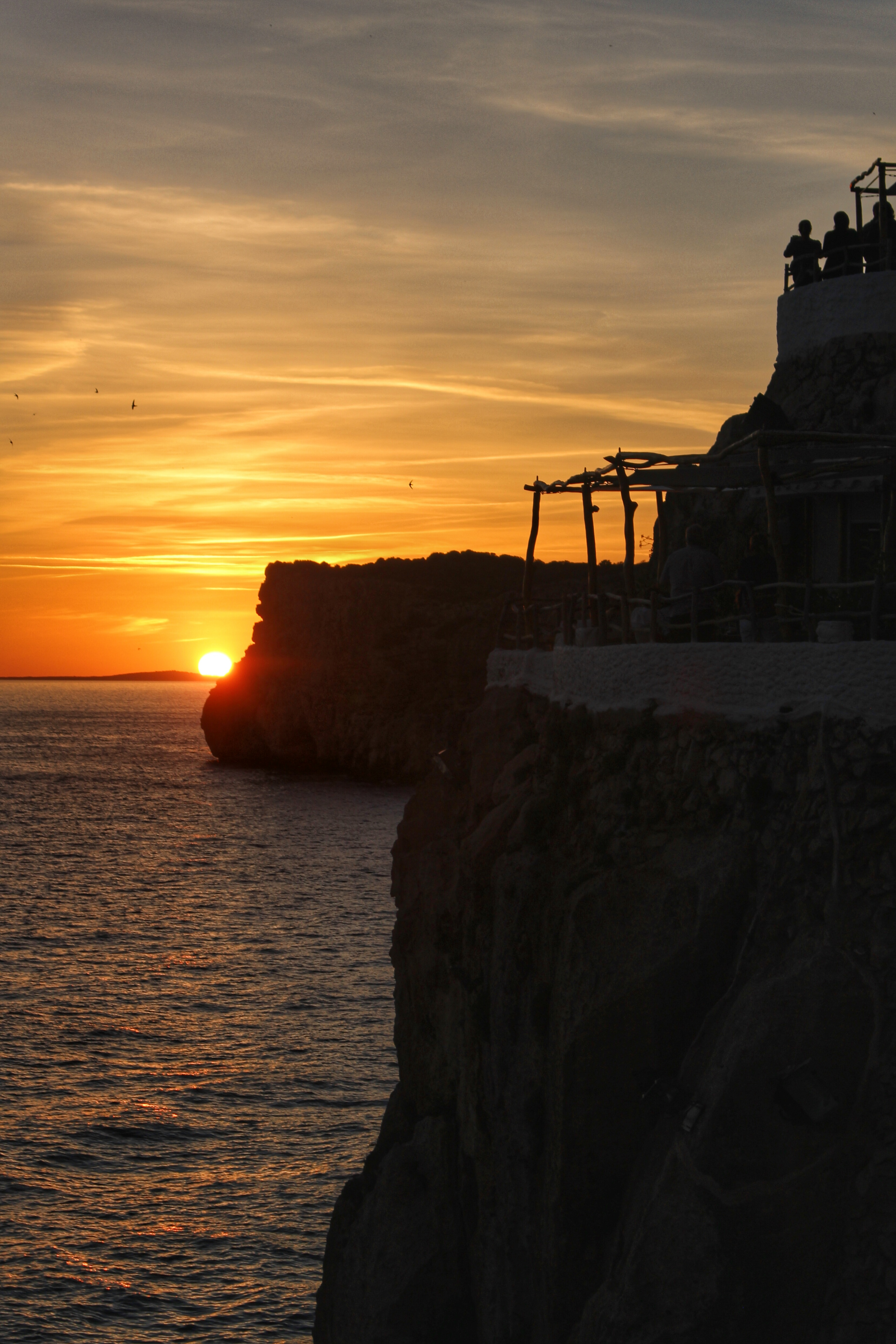
Sunset at Cova d'en Xoroi.

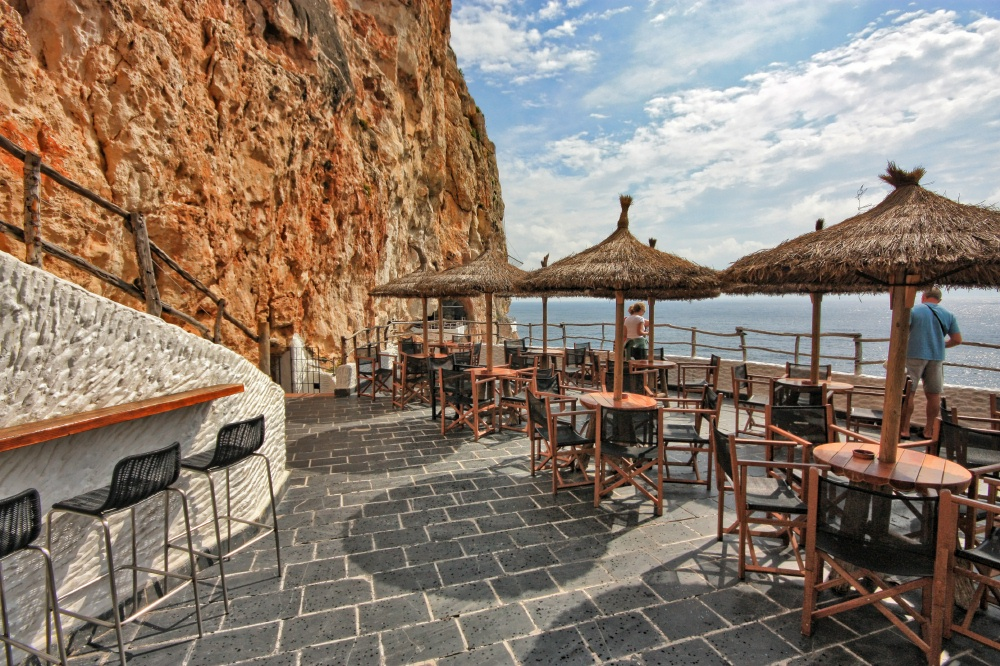
Outdoor seating at the bar

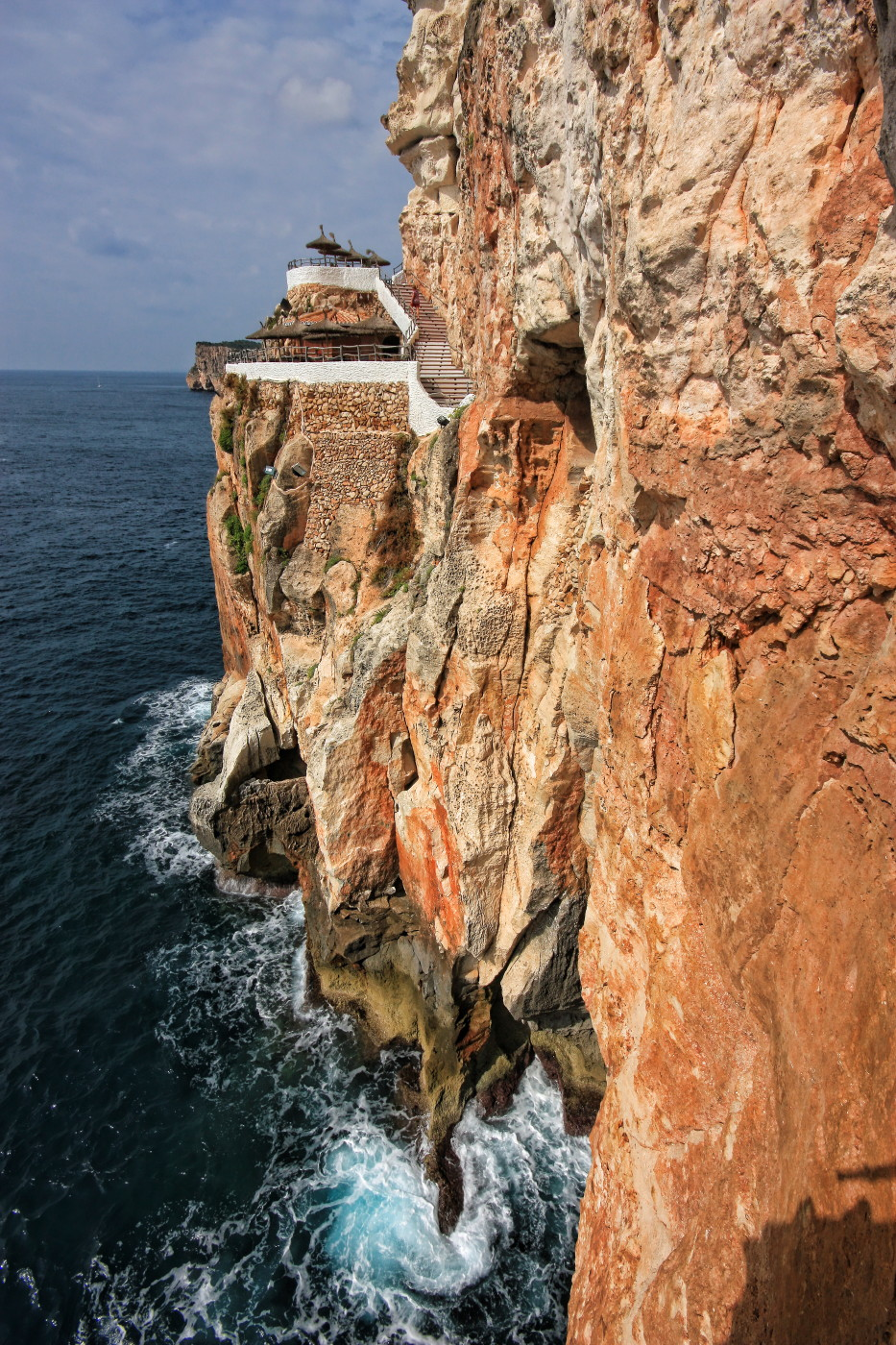
Cova d'en Xoroi
