= Son Bou =

- Village
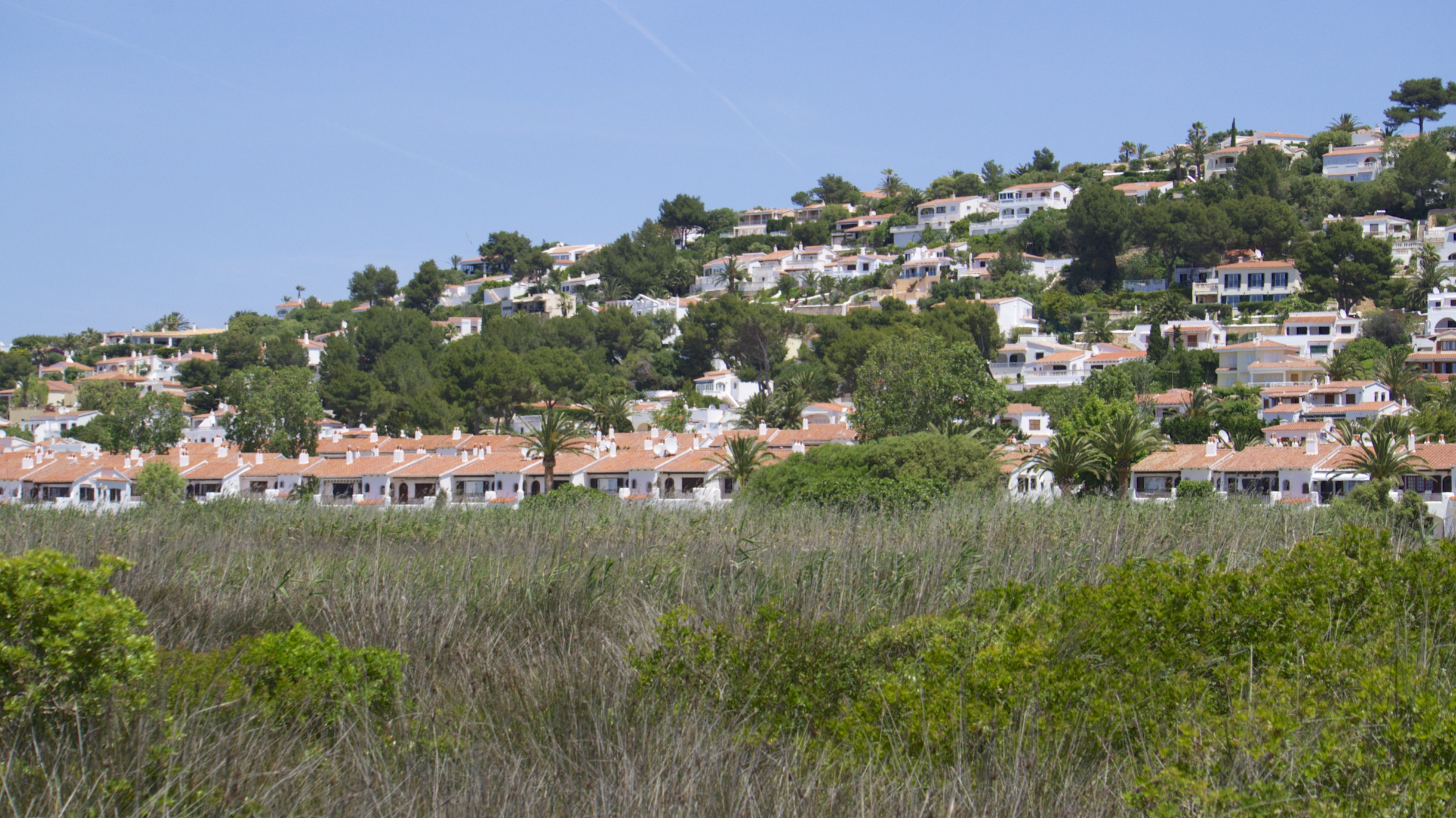
- View of the village from the salt marshes

- Location within Spain
- Coordinates: 39°53′55″N 4°4′41″E
- Country: Spain

Government
  - Body: Ajuntament d'Alaior
  - Mayor: Josefa Gutiérrez Costa (PP)

Population
  - Total: 167
- Time zone: UTC+1 (CET)
  - Summer (DST): UTC+2 (CEST)
- Postal code: 07730
- Area code: +34 (ES) + 971 (Baleares)
- Patron saints: Saint Lawrence; Saint Eulalia
- Website: www.alaior.org

Son Bou is a small village in the Alaior region of Menorca, Spain.

== Geography ==
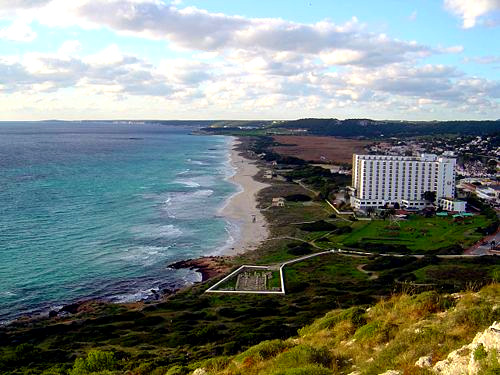
Son Bou

The village is located on the south of the island. It is split into three districts: Son Bou (mostly shops, restaurants and two large hotels), San Jaime (villas and garden apartments) and Torre Soli Nou (private villas and apartment complexes).

The beach at Son Bou is the longest on the island - some 3 km of golden sands. The government have recently put up rope fencing around the dunes to deter access, as part of their dune regeneration programme. There are three beach bars that serve food and drinks. Behind the beach is an extensive area of wetland, comprising open water and reed beds. This is a protected nature reserve containing many species of birds, amphibians and insects. The beach is very popular with naturists of all ages.

=== Climate ===
Like the rest of the island (and the Balearics), the village has a mediterranean climate (Köppen: Csa), with mild winters and long, hot summers.

== Tourist attractions ==
Son Bou has various attractions, including the Basilica Paleocristiana de Son Bou (an early Christian church of the 5th century, whose remains were discovered in 1951).

Outside of the holiday season, the Son Bou resort is very quiet as most facilities are shut down during the winter months. Within the village are four hotels; two in Son Bou, one in San Jaime and one in Torre Soli Nou. There is also a campsite, Camping Son Bou, about 2 miles away, along the back road from Torre Soli Nou.

== Cuisine ==
There are many bars and restaurants in Son Bou, several of which have adopted a British style, others choosing international cuisine, including Chinese. There are of also range of Spanish and Menorquin restaurants. During the six months of the holiday season, most nights you can find shows in most bars and clubs, and on other nights, there are quizzes and karaoke.

== Transport ==
The village has regular links with Menorca Airport, which is around 25 minutes away. Mahon is 30 minutes away, and Ciutadella is 35 minutes. There is also a bus service to the old town in Alaior, which takes around 15 minutes. There is also a small train service that travels to the top of the resort, that collects/drops off tourists in the main accommodation areas, and there is a frequency of one service every 45 minutes.
