= Son Vitamina =

Urbanisation in Balearic Islands, Spain

- Urbanisation
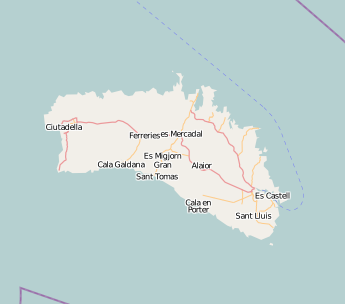
- Location in Menorca Son Vitamina (Balearic Islands) Son Vitamina (Spain)
- Coordinates: 39°52′16″N 4°9′47″E
- Country: Spain
- Autonomous Community: Balearic Islands
- Province: Balearic Islands
- Island: Menorca
- Municipality: Alaior

Area
  - Total: 0.14 km^{2} (0.054 sq mi)
- Elevation: 75 m (246 ft)

Population (2025)
  - Total: 146
  - Density: 1,000/km^{2} (2,700/sq mi)
- Time zone: UTC+1 (CET)
  - Summer (DST): UTC+2 (CEST (GMT +2))
- Postal code: 07730
- Area code: +34 (Spain) + 971 (Baleares)

Son Vitamina is an urbanisation in the Alaior municipality of Menorca, Balearic Islands, Spain. It is located on the island's south coast and is located 2 kilometres East of Cala En Porter, and is adjacent to Cales Coves.

Alaior approved the tender for the construction of a sewage system in the urbanisation in May 2024. The works cost nearly €2 million, and had been awaiting approval since 2018. The sewage system links up Son Vitamina and Cales Coves to the Cala en porter sewage treatment plant.

== Facilities ==
Son Vitamina contains no commercial premises, and the only business to have operated within the urbanisation was Nelson's Gastropub, which has since closed, meaning residents have to rely on the nearby town of Cala en Porter for shops and other services.
