= Cala En Porter =

Resort town in Balearic Islands, Spain

Cala en Porter
- Resort Town
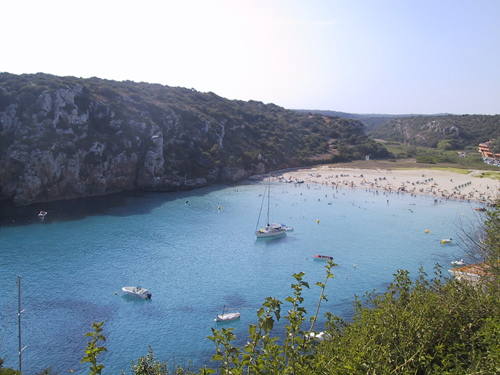
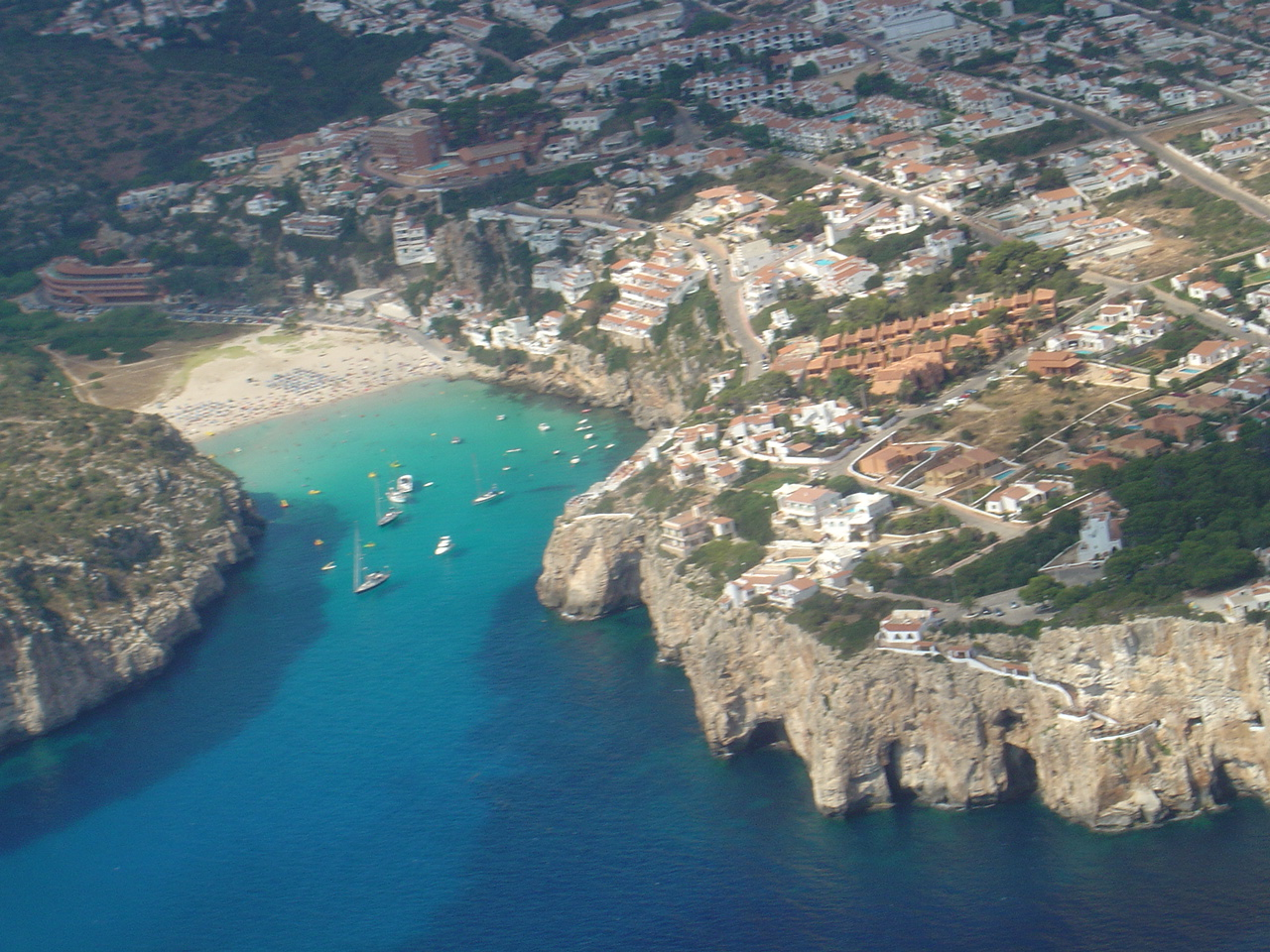
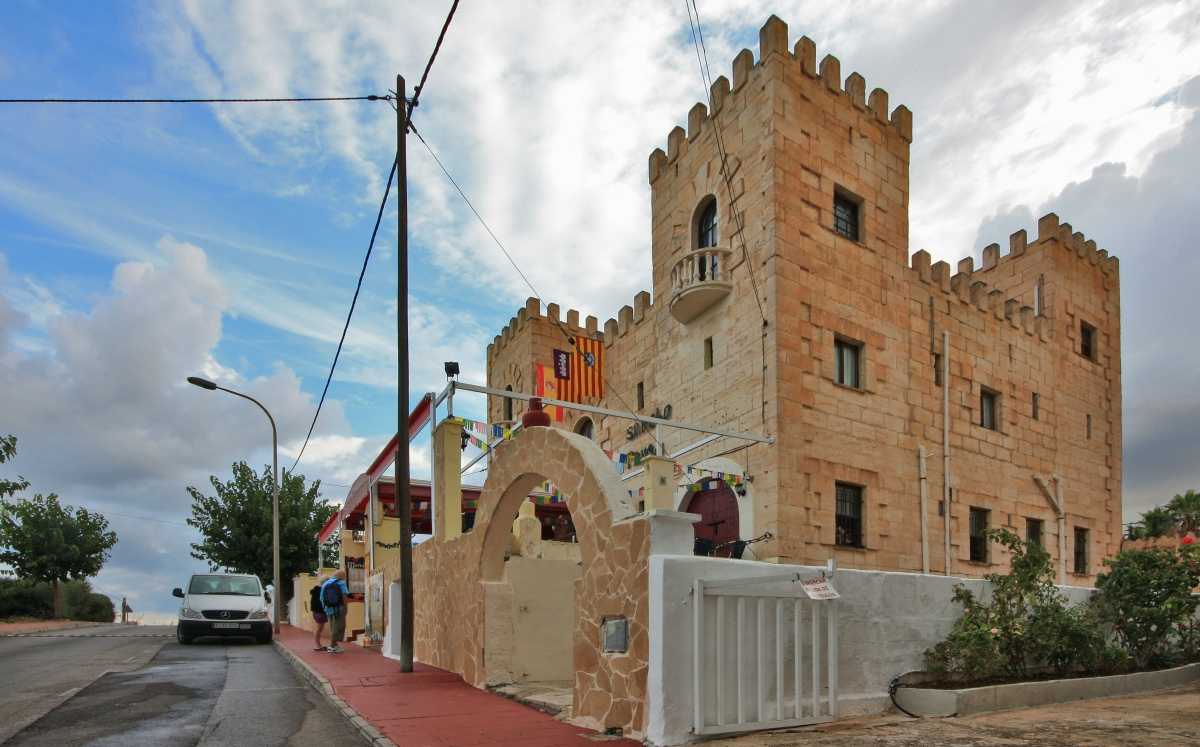
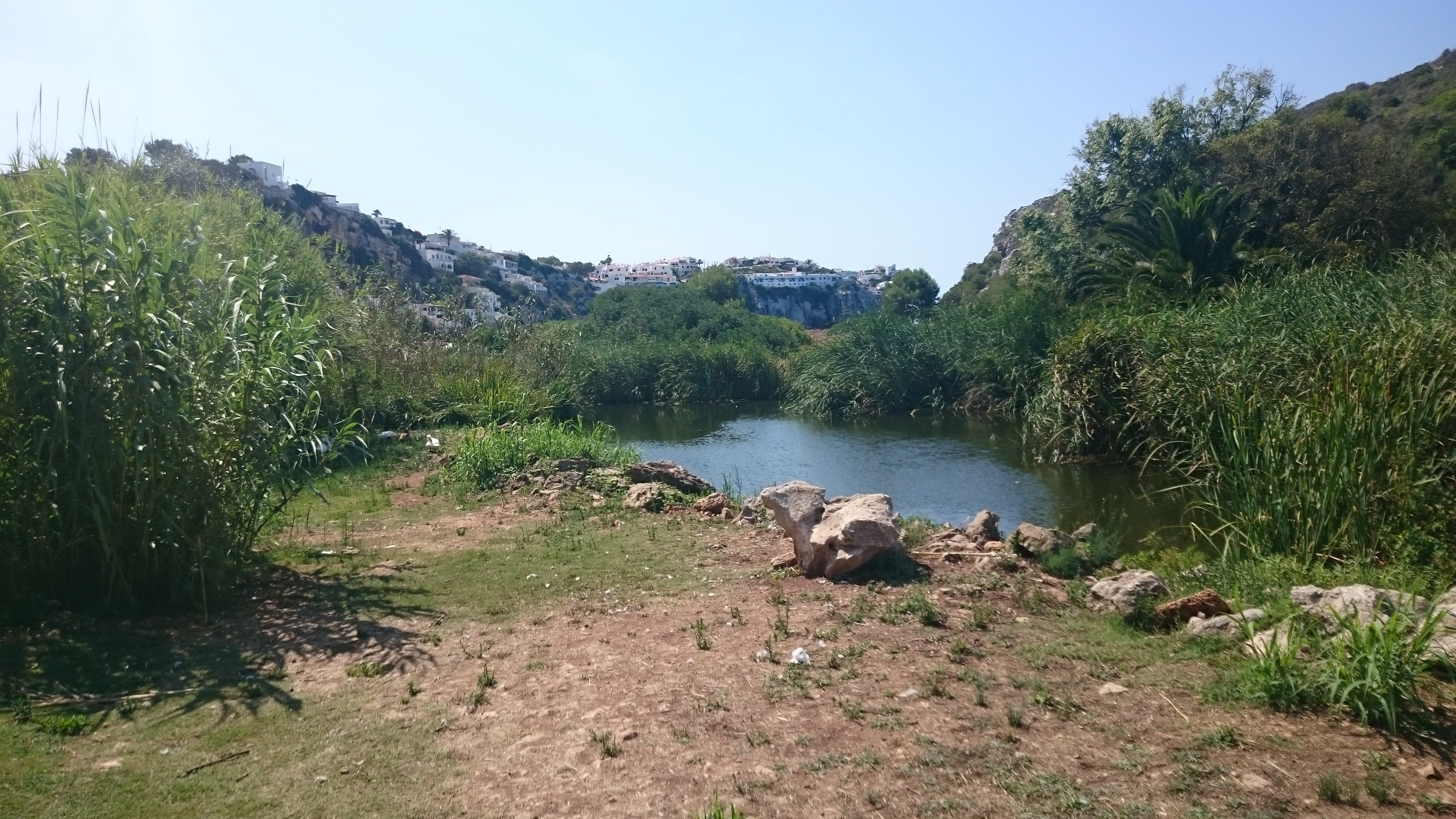
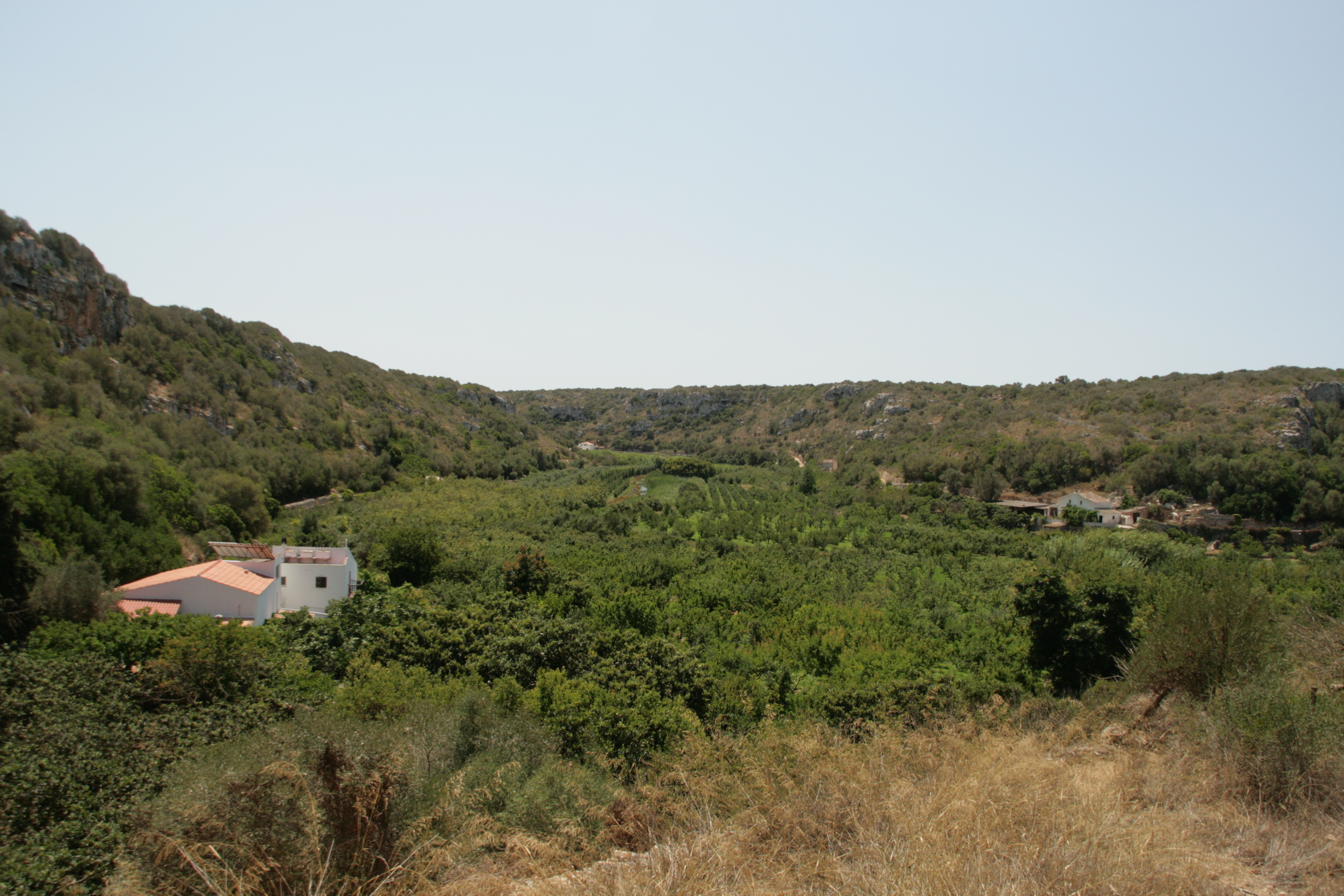
- From top to bottom and left to right: View of Cala en Porter; Aerial view of Cala en Porter; Castillo Sancho Panza; Torrent de Cala en Porter; Barranc de Cala en Porter

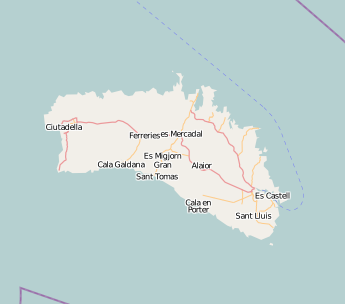
- Location in Menorca Cala en Porter (Balearic Islands) Cala en Porter (Spain)
- Coordinates: 39°52′26″N 4°8′7″E
- Country: Spain
- Autonomous Community: Balearic Islands
- Province: Balearic Islands
- Island: Menorca
- Municipality: Alaior

Area
  - Total: 0.84 km^{2} (0.32 sq mi)
- Elevation: 50 m (160 ft)

Population (2025)
  - Total: 1,318
  - Density: 1,600/km^{2} (4,100/sq mi)
- Time zone: UTC+1 (CET)
  - Summer (DST): UTC+2 (CEST (GMT +2))
- Postal code: 07730
- Area code: +34 (Spain) + 971 (Baleares)

Cala En Porter or Cala'n Porter, Calan Porter is a resort town in the Alaior municipality of Menorca, Balearic Islands, Spain. It is located on the islands south coast. The town is located 2 kilometres West from Son Vitamina and Cales Coves.

== History ==
It was one of the earliest developed beach resorts on the island, with spread out holiday villages. Cala En Porter has a beach cove similar to that of Lulworth Cove, England, UK, with high imposing limestone cliffs. Whilst the western cliff remains totally undeveloped, the eastern side is now covered in villas and terrace bars. The resort is home to a number of restaurants and bars, as well as the nightclub Cova d'en Xoroi (commonly called The Caves). It has also been used as a location for sports sailing races.

Nearby the town is the ancient Talayotic settlement of Son Rotger and the Biniadrís Cave.

In the caves at Cala En Porter, there is a folk story that claims that a Moor named Xoroi was shipwrecked there and raided farms for food before kidnapping a virgin nicknamed "The Flower of Alaior" and imprisoned her there. The townspeople allegedly found him after a snowstorm and threw him off the cliff to rescue the girl.

In 2014, a British holidaymaker died at Cala En Porter after falling off a wall by the cliff edge. Part of the cliff path was closed in 2018 for restoration and repair works. The cliffs and beaches at Cala En Porter had shown a high level of costal erosion by 2022. In 2024, the Cala En Porter beach was severely damaged by torrential rain, which led to higher tides and most of the sun loungers and the lifeguard watchtower being swept out to sea.
