= Cales Coves =

Coves in Balearic Islands, Spain

- Coves
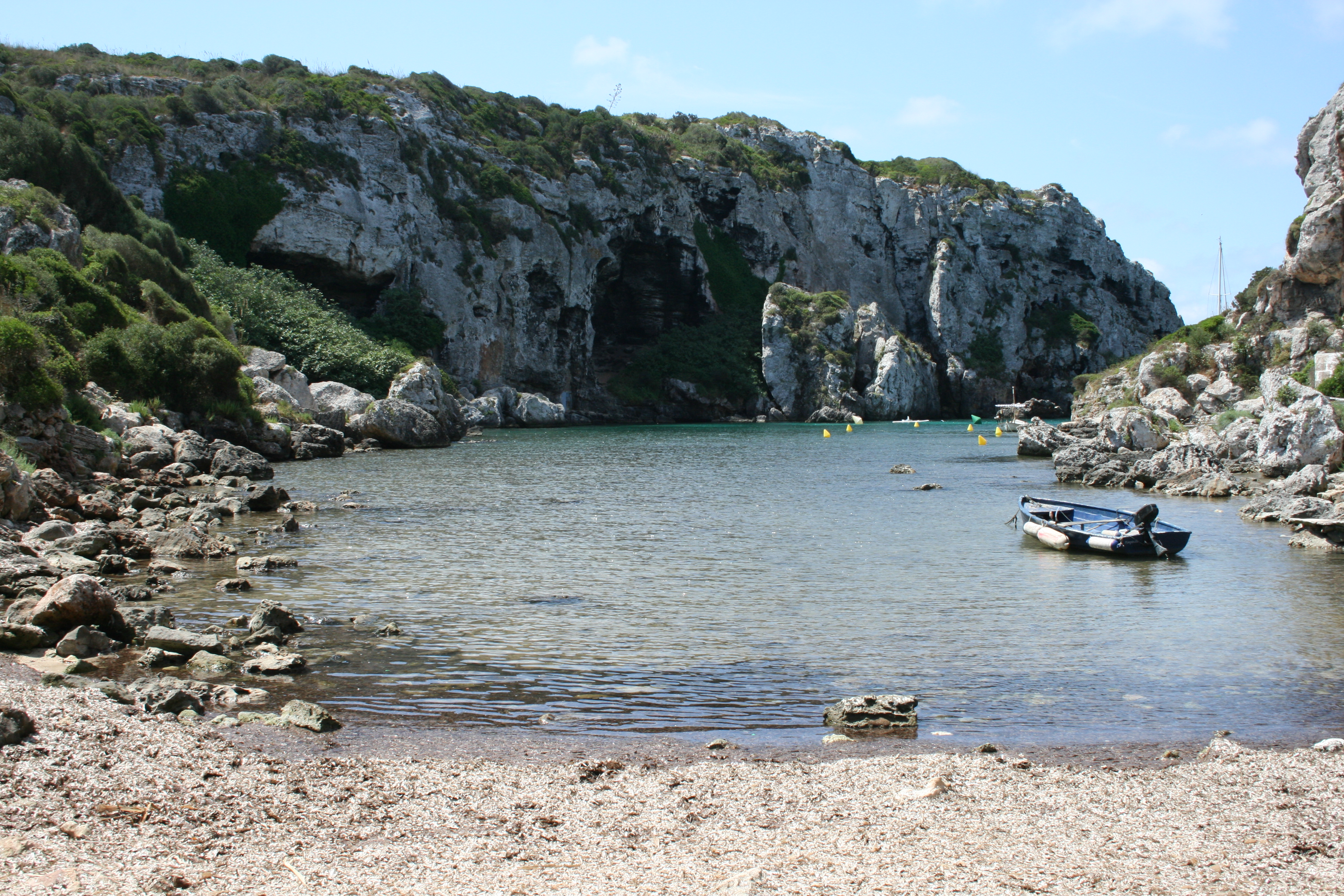
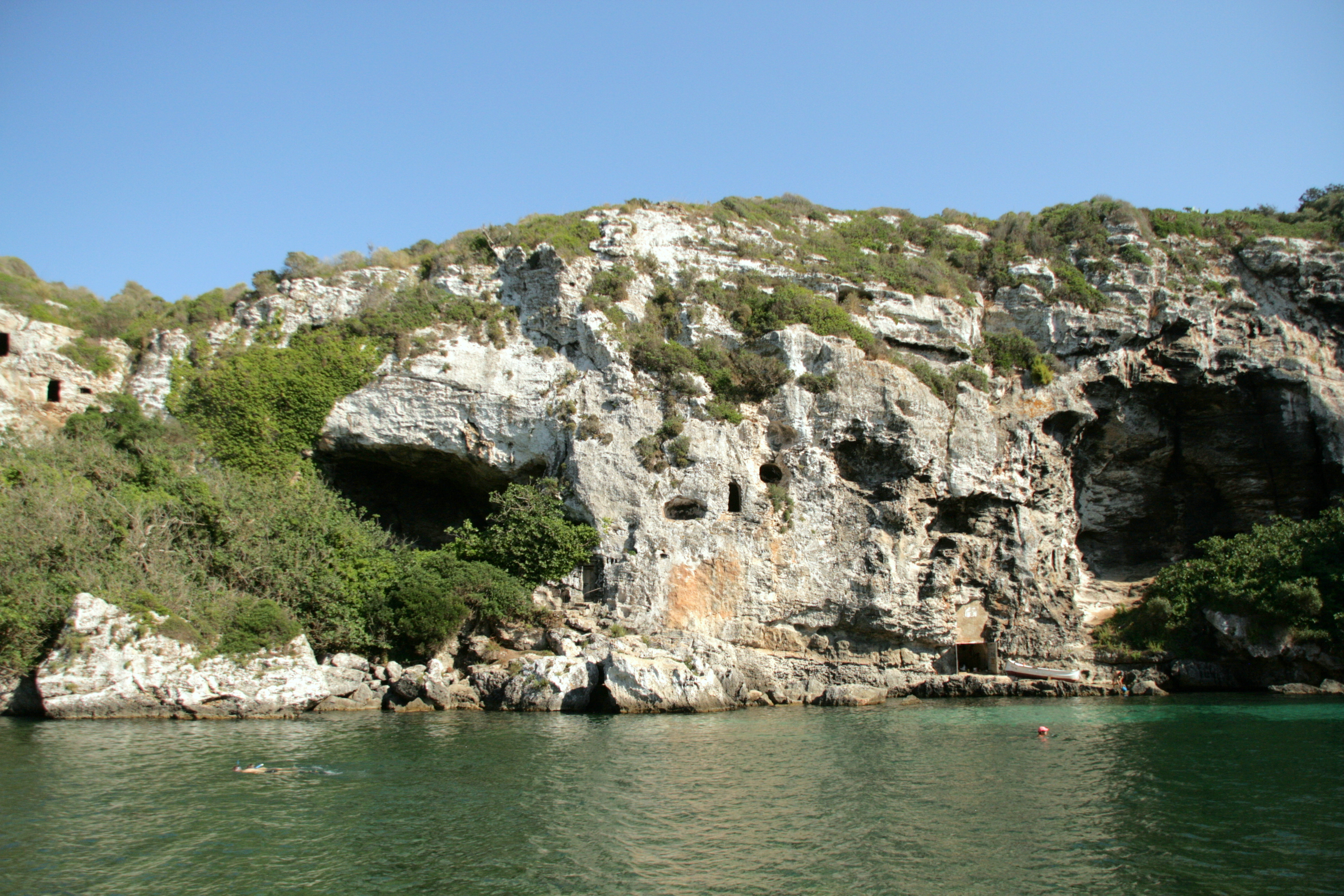
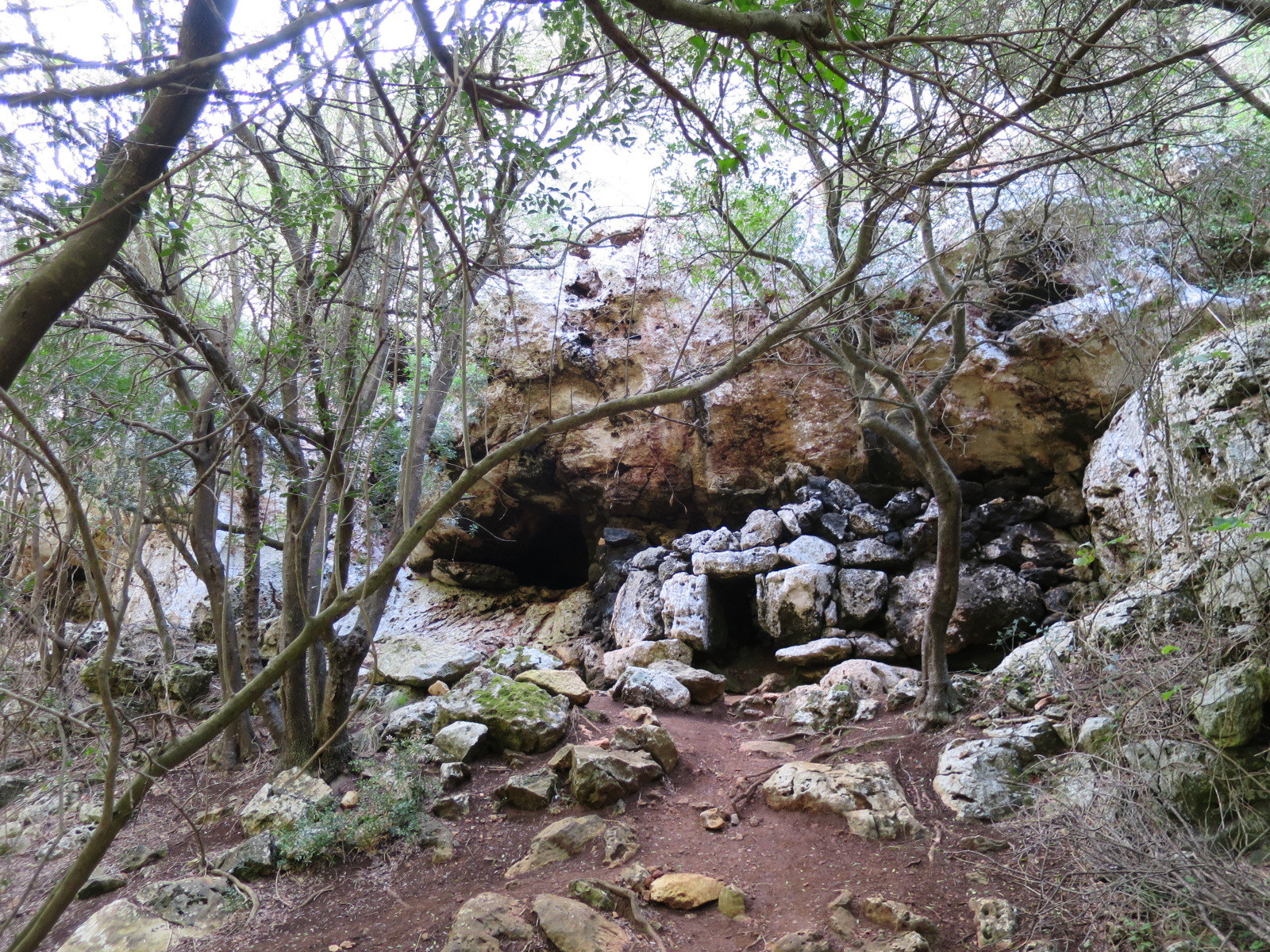
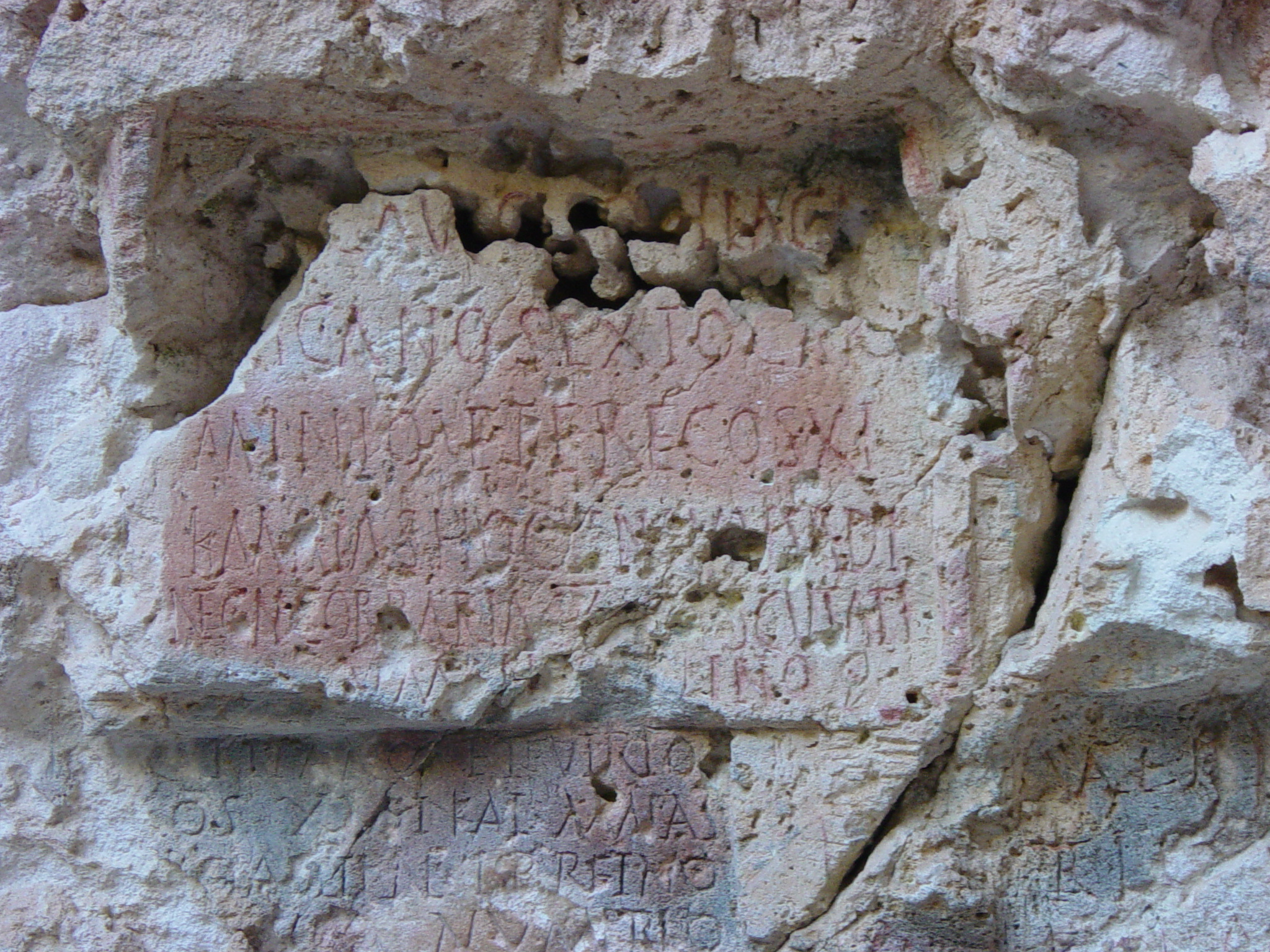
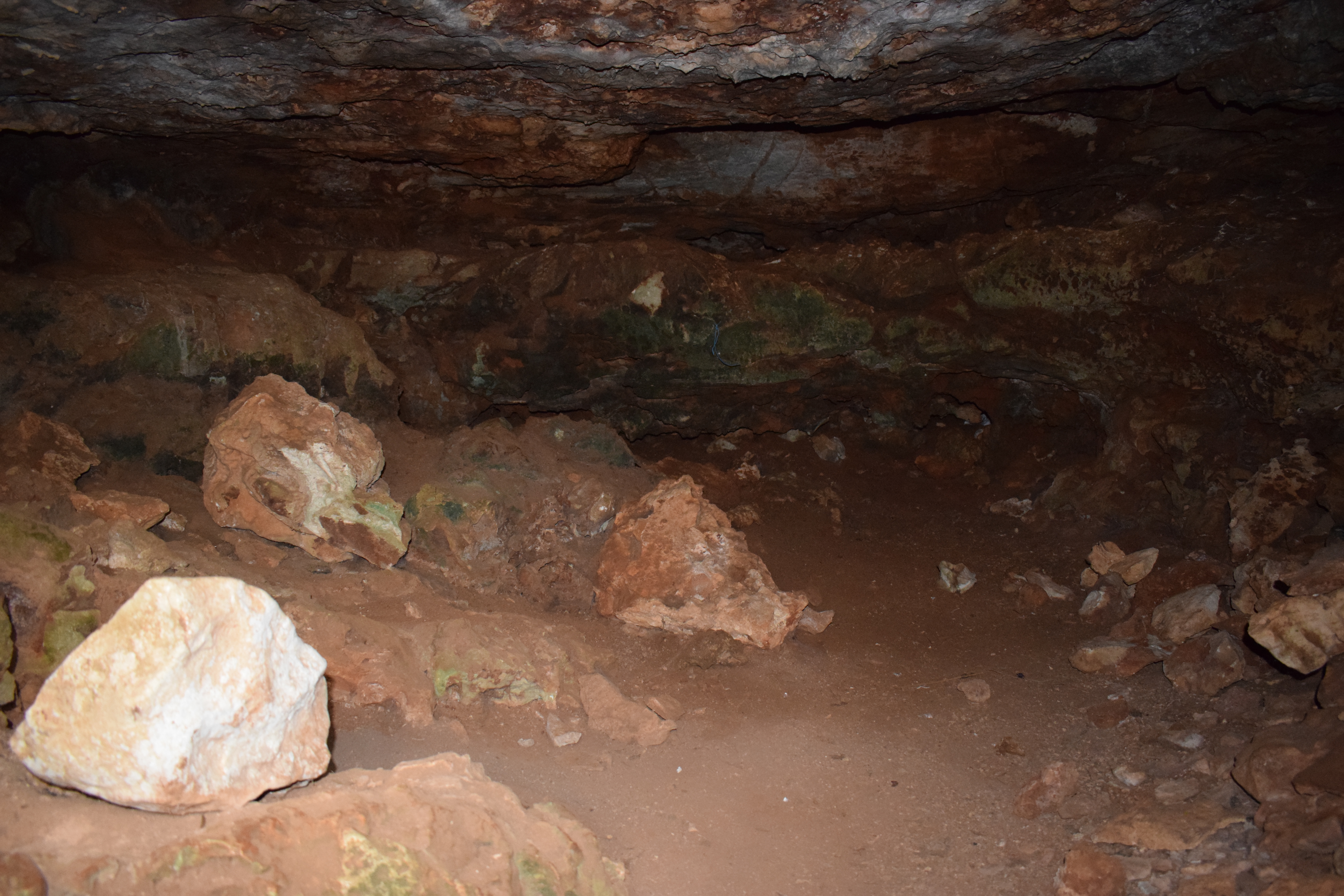
- From top to bottom and left to right: View of Cales Coves; Necropolis of Cales Coves; Prehistoric tomb; Roman inscriptions in the caves; Inside one of the caves

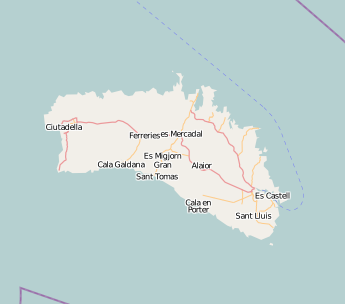
- Coves in Menorca Cales Coves (Balearic Islands) Cales Coves (Spain)
- Coordinates: 39°51′52″N 4°8′44″E
- Country: Spain
- Autonomous Community: Balearic Islands
- Province: Balearic Islands
- Island: Menorca
- Municipality: Alaior

Area
  - Total: 0.13 km^{2} (0.050 sq mi)
- Elevation: 43 m (141 ft)

Population (2026)
  - Total: 4
  - Density: 31/km^{2} (80/sq mi)
- Time zone: UTC+1 (CET)
  - Summer (DST): UTC+2 (CEST (GMT +2))
- Postal code: 07730
- Area code: +34 (Spain) + 971 (Baleares)

Cales Coves or Calascoves are two sandy coves in Menorca. The coves are located one and a half kilometres South of the village of Cales Coves and Son Vitamina.

The coves are located between 80 vertical cliffs housing caves, which were excavated by the early inhabitants of Menorca in the Tenth Century BC, and served as tombs until the Roman conquest. The coves also have a natural spring with a clear water fountain. There are 90 tombs at the coves, which are the largest accumulation of burial caves on Menorca.

== Prehistory ==
The caves were excavated by the early inhabitants of Menorca in the Tenth Century BC, and was used as a Necropolis until the Roman conquest. The necropolis lost its significance, but was still culturally important to the island, as 22 Roman inscriptions from the 2nd or 3rd Century survive in the caves. The caves were designated a historic moment on June 3, 1931.

== History ==
Cales Coves was a pilgrimage site during the Roman period, and was also a major port between the 4th Century BC and 6th Century AD.

Since the Middle Ages, the caves were used for sheltering fisherman, Pirates, and traffickers.

French Scholar, Emile Carthaillac studied the necropolis during the 19th Century. He noted that the caves collapsed during excavations, with the extant caves being only the inner chambers.

The caves were occupied by young hippies during the 1960s, where the coves were considered a sanctuary of nudity, which was controversial with Menorcan residents, who saw this as appropriation of their cultural heritage, and were also concerned by the vandalism and decay of the caves. This led to metal gates being installed in 2001, preventing access.
