= Alaior =

- Municipality
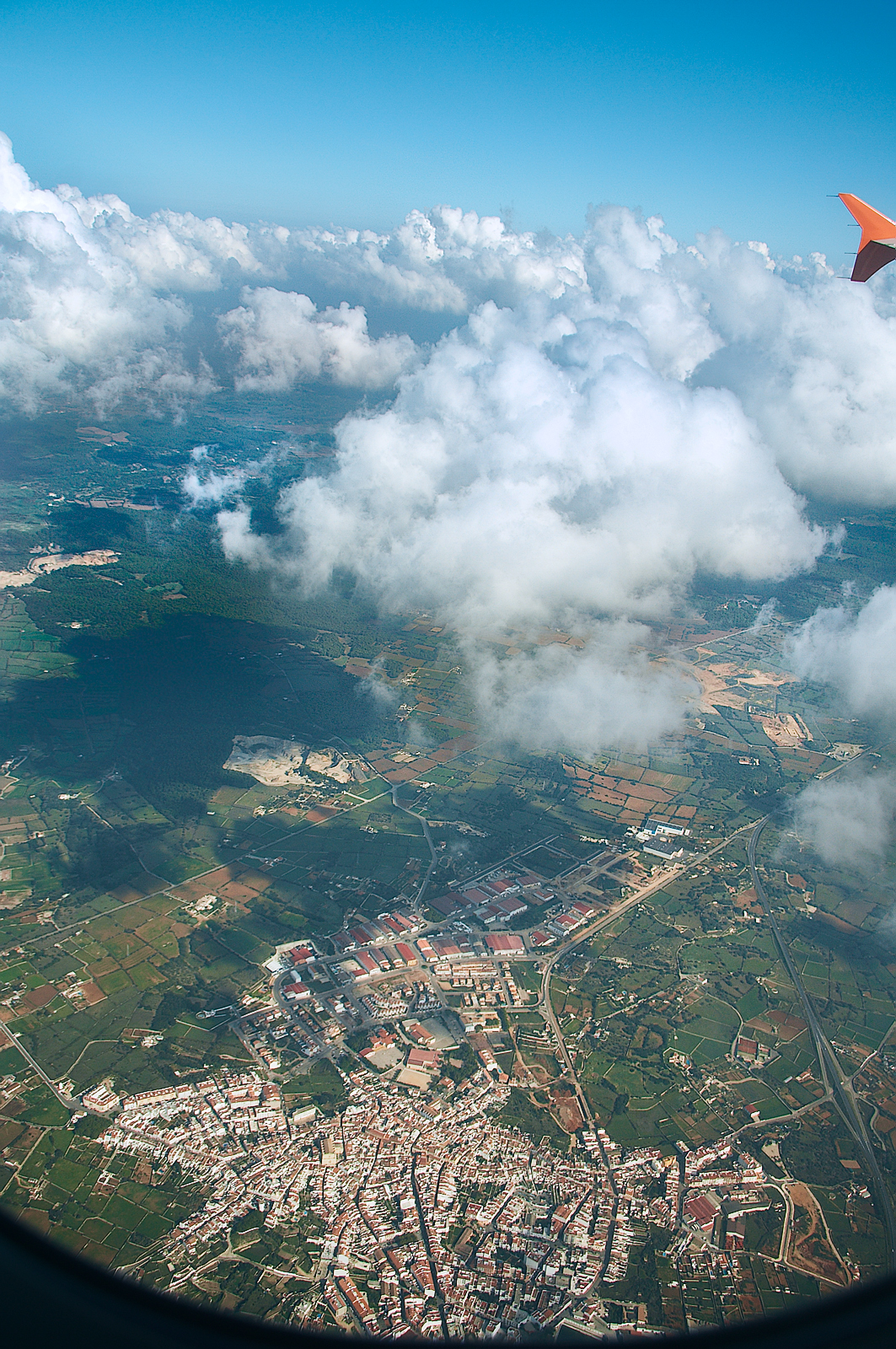
- Alaior from air

- Flag Coat of arms

- Map of Alaior in Menorca

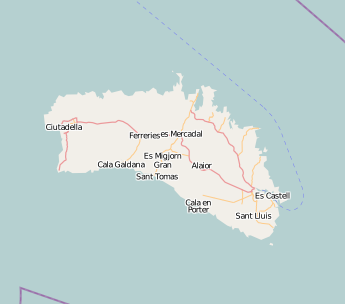
- Location in Menorca Alaior (Balearic Islands) Alaior (Spain)
- Coordinates: 39°56′3″N 4°8′24″E
- Country: Spain
- Autonomous Community: Balearic Islands
- Province: Balearic Islands
- Island: Menorca

Government
  - Mayor: José Luis Benejam Saura (PP)

Area
  - Total: 110 km^{2} (42 sq mi)
- Elevation (AMSL): 130 m (430 ft)

Population (2024)
  - Total: 10,158
  - Density: 92/km^{2} (240/sq mi)
- Time zone: UTC+1 (CET)
  - Summer (DST): UTC+2 (CEST (GMT +2))
- Postal code: 07730
- Area code: +34 (Spain) + 971 (Baleares)
- Website: Town Hall

Alaior (Balearic Catalan: [ələˈjo], locally [(ə)ləˈo], [(ə)ˈlo]; previously in Spanish: Alayor) is a municipality located in the eastern part of the island of Menorca, in the Balearic Islands, Spain. The municipality seat is situated 12 kilometres from the island's capital, Mahón. Established following the Catalan-Aragonese conquest, Alaior is well known for its cheesemaking and shoe manufacturing. As of 2024, the municipality had a population of 10,158 and encompasses several localities, including the coastal resorts of Cala En Porter and Son Bou.

== Geography and location ==
Alaior is located in the eastern part of Menorca, with the municipality seat approximately 12 kilometres from the island's capital, Mahón and about an 18 minute drive from the Menorca Airport. The landscape is rural, marked by windmills, wells, and a network of walking and cycling paths, including routes such as the one from the Ermita de San Llorenç to Binixems. Elevated areas like the Munt de l'Angel Park offer views of the surrounding countryside.

== History ==
Human settlement in Alaior dates back to between 2200 and 1000 BC, as evidenced by prehistoric burial sites such as the Ses Roques Llises tomb. Following the Roman conquest of the Iberian Peninsula, Menorca's economic focus shifted to its coastal towns, but after the Catalan-Aragonese conquest in 1287 by King Alfonso III of Aragon, inland settlements like Alaior began to take shape. The town was officially established in 1304, when King James II of Majorca purchased the Islamic estate of Ihalor, around which the community developed, centered on the newly founded church of Saint Eulàlia.

By the 17th century, Alaior had gained greater administrative independence, marked by the right to collect its own taxes. In 1644, during a Barbary pirate attack, the town’s mayor, Miquel Barçola Cardona, was killed and his standard later became the municipal banner. The 19th century, industrialisation started, particularly in shoe manufacturing. From the 1950s onward, Alaior experienced economic growth driven by livestock farming, cheese production, agriculture, metalworking, and tourism.

== Demographics ==
According to an evaluation by the Spanish National Statistics Institute, Alaior had a population of 10,158 in 2024, reflecting a steady growth from the 9,686 residents recorded in the 2021 official Spanish census. This represents a population average annual increase of approximately 1.6% over the three-year period. The municipality covers an area of 109.9 km², resulting in a population density of around 92.46 inhabitants per square kilometre.

The population structure of Alaior is fairly balanced in terms of gender, with men accounting for 5,098 individuals (50.2%) and women slightly fewer at 5,060 (49.8%). The age distribution shows a predominantly working-age population, with 63.8% of residents between 18 and 64 years old. Children under 18 make up 17% of the population, while seniors aged 65 and over represent 19.2%.

Alaior is largely composed of Spanish nationals, who make up 84.5% of the population. However, it is also home to a diverse array of international residents. Individuals from Europe represent the largest foreign group with 4.4% from the European Union and 4.9% from other parts of Europe, followed by residents from the Americas (3.2%) and Africa (2.9%). There are also 19 individuals who are citizens of Asia or Oceania (0.4%). In terms of country of birth, 79.9% of Alaior's population was born in Spain. Among foreign-born residents, the largest groups are from the Americas (6.8%), followed by the European Union (4%), other parts of Europe (4.8%), and Africa (4.1%), as well as 35 individuals born in Asia or Oceania.

The localities of Alaior include the Municipality Seat of Alaior with a population of 7,004 estimated in 2023. The next largest locality with 1,140 residents is Cala En Porter, with other localities in the municipality including San Jaime Mediterráneo, L'Argentina, Son Vitamina, Torressolí Nou, Calescoves, and Son Bou.

== Tourism ==
In Alaior there are several notable beaches, including Cala En Porter and Son Bou. Cala En Porter, situated at the head of an inlet with gently sloping sand, is accessible by local bus and is considered suitable for families. Son Bou, the longest beach on the island, is known for its wide expanse of sand and clear waters. In addition to its coastal attractions, Alaior features a range of bars and cafes that contribute to a vibrant local nightlife.

== Culture ==
Alaior is known for its skilled jewellery makers and traditional shoe manufacturing, with many products available in local shops. It also well known for its dairy industry, especially for Menorcan Cheese, with local cheese factories open to visitors, allowing insight into the cheesemaking process. Homemade sausages, ice cream, and pastries further enrich the culinary offerings for visitors.

== Administration and local government ==
The municipal government of Alaior is led by José Luis Benejam Saura of the local political group Partido Popular (PP). Following eight years in which his partly led the government, in the 2019 Spanish local elections he was elected mayor after gaining an absolute majority, increasing the party's relative power. Four years later, in the 2023 Spanish local elections, he revalidated the absolute majority and was re-elected.

== See also ==
- List of municipalities in Balearic Islands
