= Taula =

Stone monument found on Menorca, Balearic Islands

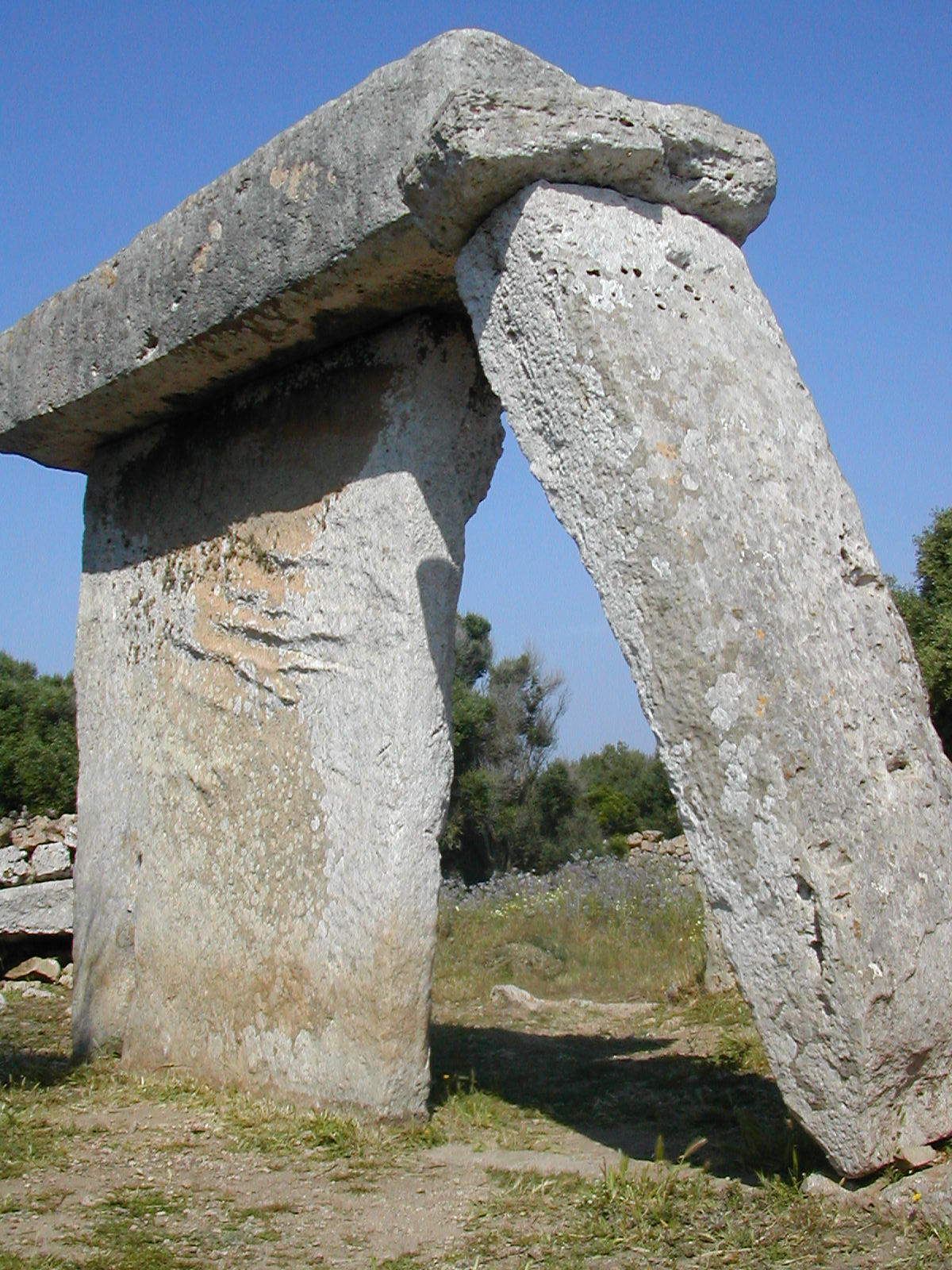
This is a taula from the site of Talatí de Dalt about 4 km west of Maó.

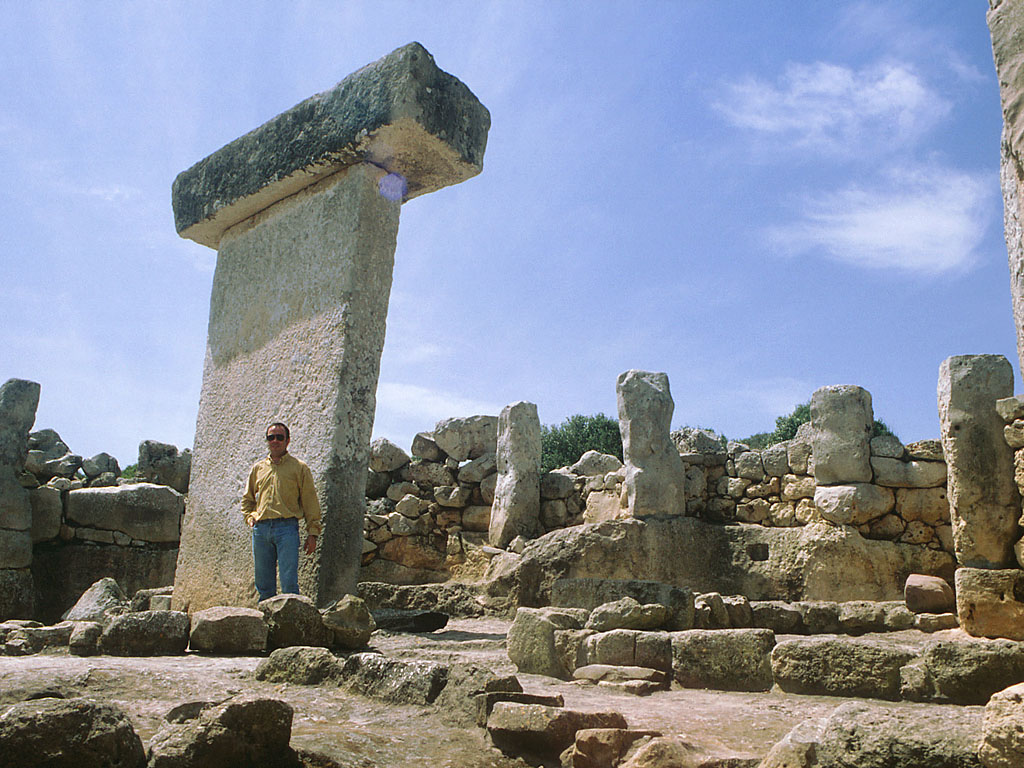
Taula of Torralba

A taula (meaning 'table' in Catalan) is a Stonehenge-esque stone monument found on the Balearic island of Menorca. Taulas can be up to 5 metres high and consist of a vertical pillar (a monolith or several smaller stones on top of each other) with a horizontal stone lying on it. A U-shaped wall often encloses the structure.

They were built by the Talaiotic culture between 500 BC and 300 BC.

Their exact cultural meaning remains unknown, but they probably had religious and/or astronomical purposes. Most of the taulas face south, which seems to suggest some astronomical meaning. Archeologist Michael Hoskin has suggested the taulas may have been part of an ancient healing cult. They are frequently found near talaiots.

The first author who wrote about these structures was Juan Ramis in his book Antigüedades célticas de la isla de Menorca ("Celtic Antiquities of the Island of Menorca"), which was published 1818, being the first book in the Spanish language entirely devoted to Prehistory.

Examples include those at Torre Trencada, Talatí de Dalt, Torrellissá Nou, Trepucó, and the site at Torralba d'en Salord.

== Location ==
- Alfurinet
- Algaiarens
- Bellaventura
- Biniac Vell
- Binicrodell Nou
- Binimaimut
- Binimassó
- Binisafullet
- Cavalleria
- Cotaina
- Es Tudons
- La Beltrana
- Na Comerma de sa Garita
- Sa Torreta de Tramuntana
- Sant Agustí Vell
- So na Caçana Est
- So na Caçana Oest
- Son Angladó
- Son Bernardí
- Son Catlar
- Son Olivaret Nou
- Son Rotger
- Talatí de Dalt
- Torralba d'en Salort
- Torralbenc Vell
- Torre d'en Galmés
- Torrellafuda
- Torrellisà
- Torretrencada
- Torrevella d'en Lozano
- Trepucó
- Sa Cudia Cremada

== See also ==
- Dolmen
- Megalith
- Menhir

== Bibliography ==
- LAGARDA, F. (Coord.) (2011). Las Enigmáticas Taulas de Menorca. Homenaje a Josep Mascaró i Pasarius. Volumen 1. Sobradiel: 2011.
- LAGARDA, F. (Coord.) (2012). Las Enigmáticas Taulas de Menorca. Homenaje a Josep Mascaró i Pasarius. Volumen 2. Sobradiel: 2012.
