= Cap de Cavalleria Ecomuseum =

Museum in Spain

Coordinates: 40°03′55″N 4°5′20″E

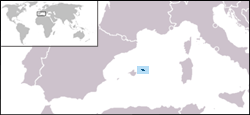
Location of the island of Menorca, in the western part of the Mediterranean Sea

The Cap de Cavalleria Ecomuseum is an institution which is located on the northernmost coast of Menorca (Balearic Islands, Spain), in the proximity of Cavalleria Cape and the port of Sanitja (Santa Teresa, Es Mercadal).

== History ==
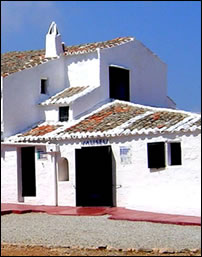
Entrance of the museum in Cap de Cavalleria (Santa Teresa building)

The Ecomuseum was created in 1997 by the non-profit association “San Nitja. Gestión del Patrimonio Mediterráneo”, with the main objective of protecting, investigating and spreading the cultural and natural resources of Cavalleria and the port of Sanitja. This task is carried out by the interdisciplinary study of the following elements: geological (sedimentation and stratigraphy), biological (native fauna and flora), environmental (preservation of the environment to face up to the pressure of different factors such as tourism), ethnologic (lime kiln, dry walls, lighthouse, etc.), as well as historic and archaeological (Roman military fort, city and medieval mosque), all of them located in the area. Among them, it is worth highlighting the last element mentioned, due to the archaeological interventions in the port of Sanitja, which are carried out in the Roman military fort, dating from the 1st century B. C., and the Roman city of Sanisera (1st century B. C. to 6th century A. D.)

== Visitors ==
The Ecomuseum’s visitors receive all the information related to this territory inside the Santa Teresa building, by means of audiovisual material, scale models and the exhibition of the archaeological findings revealed in the excavations that are carried out in the port of Sanitja. The exhibition “Discover the North!”, inaugurated in 2005, offers a general view of all the elements mentioned above, and it is translated into six languages: Catalan, Spanish, English, German, Italian and French.

Moreover, once visitors has seen the exhibition in the Santa Teresa building, they can continue with the free visit of the surrounding area by following the “7 routes” guide, which starts at the way out of the museum and which complements what is exhibited in the showroom, in order to know the most important cultural and natural elements of the landscape.
