= Binissafullet =

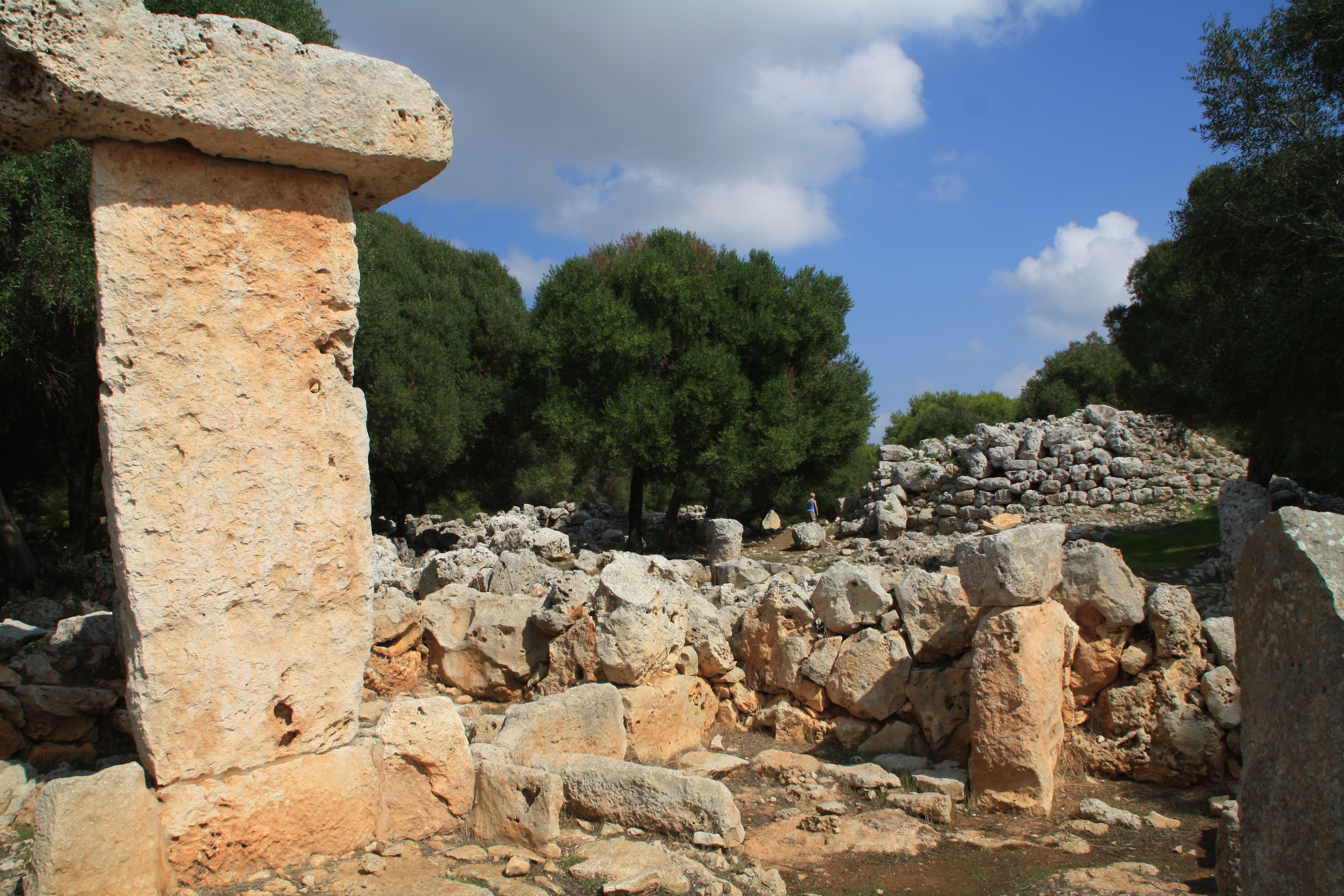
Taula enclosure at Binissafullet

Binissafullet is a Talayotic settlement (Late Bronze Age and Iron Age) which was occupied from the 10th century BC and had its height during the 4th and 3rd centuries BC. It is located in Menorca, one of the Balearic Islands. Medieval Islamic materials scattered around the site's surface suggest a later occupation during the Medieval period.

Binissafullet has several elements which are usually found in Talayotic settlements: a talayot, a taula enclosure, a hypostyle hall, dwellings, and silos.

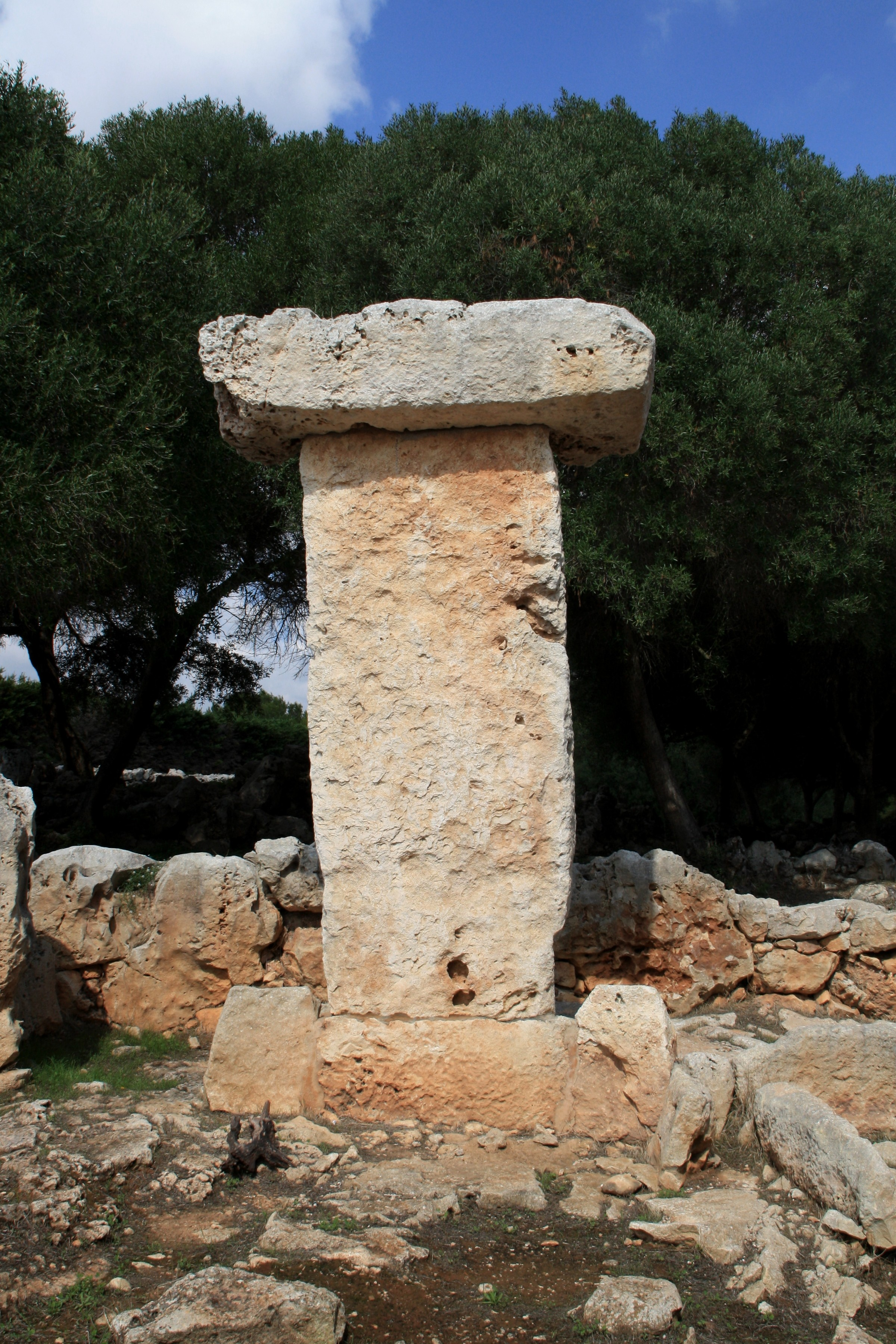
Binissafullet's Taula monument, which is the only one that has a base.

In 1988, the site was deforested. In 1990, its taula enclosure was excavated and restored. The taula, the main element inside the enclosure, was found on the ground during the excavations and later restored by replacing it in its upright position. Binissafullet's taula is unique due to its small dimensions and the small breadth of its vertical or supporting stone. Moreover, it is the only taula on Menorca that has been erected after having been found on the ground. The other six taulas which still stand in their upright positions have withstood the passing of time since Prehistory.

Excavations conducted in the taula enclosure gave a lot of information about its use and the activities carried out inside. Fragments of Punic amphorae and faunal remains, mostly from sheep and goats, as well as remains of a hearth, indicate that ritual activities were probably performed in this building, where the consumption of wine and meat was important. All the artifacts and other remains located in these excavations are currently kept in the Museum of Menorca (Museu de Menorca).

It is one of 32 sites that form part of the nomination series of Talayotic Minorca to become a World Heritage site by UNESCO.

== How to get there ==
The site is located in road Me-10 which connects Sant Lluís and Binissafúller's residential area. By following the direction towards Binissafúller, the site is located in km point 2,3 which is opposite the diversion to the left that leads to the said residential area. At this point, the site can be easily seen from the road itself.

== Bibliography ==
- Plantalamor, L. (1997). La Taula de Binisafullet. Meloussa, 4: 35-47.
- Isbert, F. (1993). La taula de Binesafullet. Una interesante restauración. Revista de Arqueología, 149: 10-15.
