= Sanisera =

Archaeological Roman site in Menorca, Spain

Coordinates: 40°04′15″N 4°5′17″E

Sanisera was one of the Roman cities located in the island of Menorca (Balearic Islands, Spain), which was mentioned by Pliny the Elder in his book Naturalis Historia, III, 77–78 in the 1st century BC:

The Baleares, so formidable in war with their slingers, have received from the Greeks the name of Gymnasiæ. The larger island is 100 miles in length, and 475 in circumference. It has the following towns; Palma and Pollentia, enjoying the rights of Roman citizens, Cinium and Tucis, with Latin rights; and Bocchorum was a federate town. At thirty miles' distance is the smaller island, 40 miles in length, and 150 in circumference; it contains the states of Jamnon, Sanisera, and Magon.

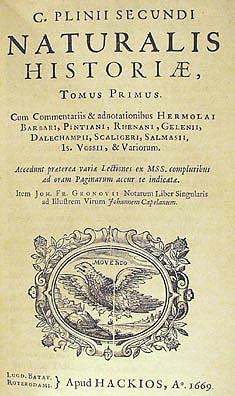
Naturalis Historia, 1669 edition.

== Location ==
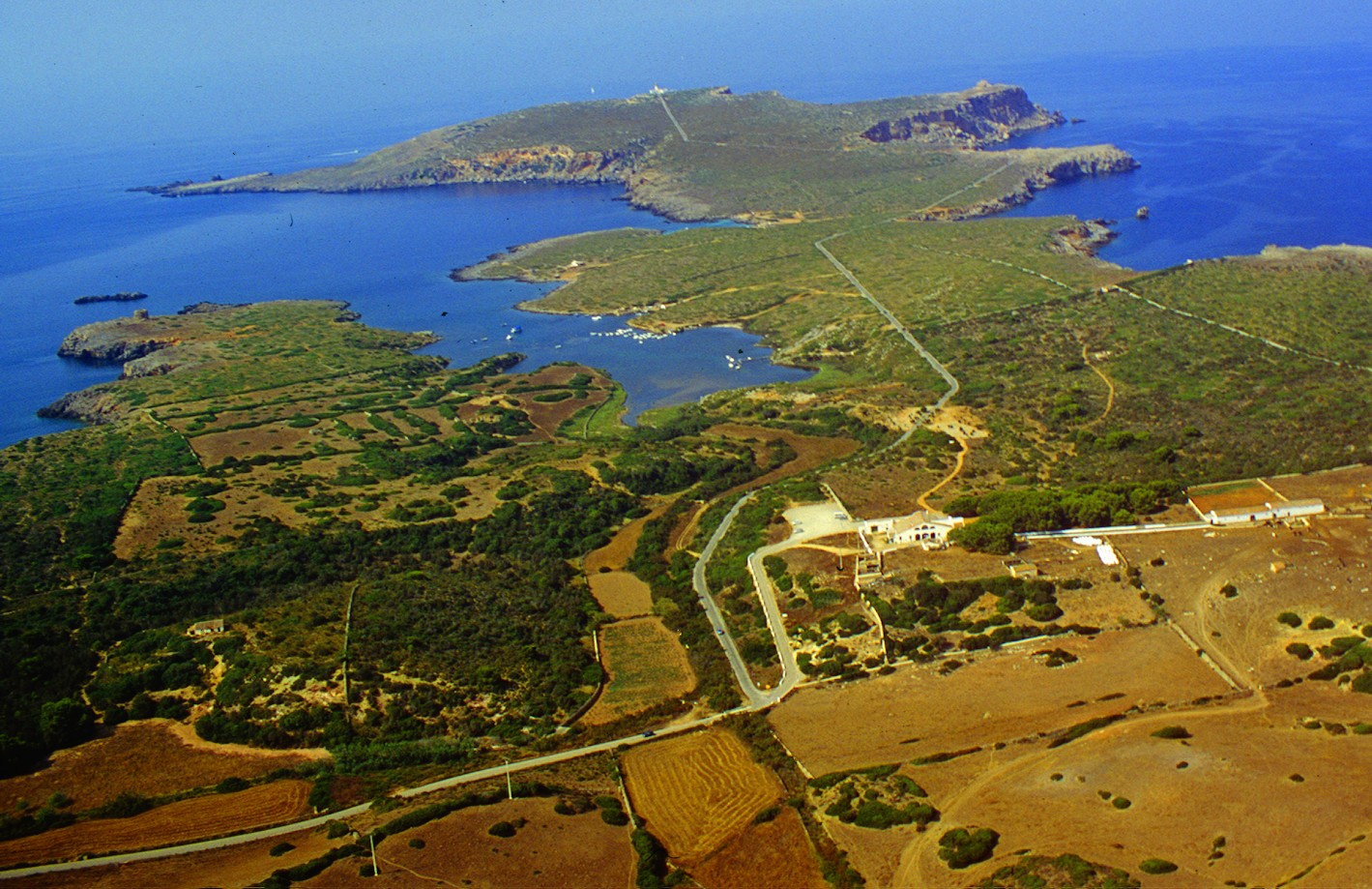
Aerial view of the Port of Sanitja

The archaeological site of Sanisera is located in the natural port of Sanitja, next to the Cavalleria Cape or Cap de Cavallería (Es Mercadal), which is placed on the rocky northern coast of the island. Cavalleria Cape is a peninsula which points to the north, whose eastern end is called Punta Llevant (eastern point), an 89-metre-high cliff which presents a 19th-century lighthouse; and whose most important inlet is the Port of Sanitja. The western part of the port consists of a long sub-peninsula, whose most characteristic element is an English watchtower built at the beginning of the 19th century, located at its northeastern end. Close to the coast, there are two small rocky islands which act as breakwaters. Regarding the eastern side of the port, it presents similar characteristics to those of the western side, and where S’Almadrava is located, a house which was built in the 18th century as a shelter for fishermen. Moreover, an old quarry of limestone and a lime kiln are located to the south of the port, possibly belonging to the 18th or 19th century. All these elements help the visitor understand the importance of the port of Sanitja, which, despite its small dimensions in comparison to other ports in the island, has always been an inducement of different nature throughout History.

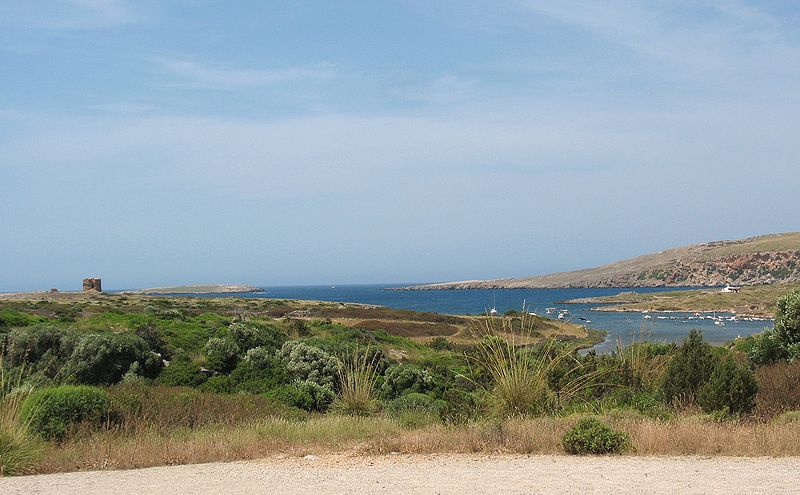
General view of the Port of Sanitja, from the Cap de Cavalleria Ecomuseum

As has already been mentioned, the different structures that can be seen at both sides of the port of Sanitja discern the importance of the place, which is attested by its stratigraphy, since it presents the ideal conditions for the entrance and anchorage of vessels, as well as being a good place for protection in bad weather conditions, such as when the northern wind (tramontane) blows. The port, following a south-southeast orientation, is 800 metres in length and c. 150–200 metres in width, and its entrance is flanked by the island of Porros and a rocky arm which measures around 200 metres, belonging to the northern end of the Cavalleria peninsula, being both of them united underwater and in this way creating a natural dike that abates the swell during bad weather conditions. These characteristics have been key factors for many peoples who have settled down in this place; since the Roman army, during the conquest of the Balearic Islands that took place in 123 BC., decided to establish itself in this location as a strategic military enclave. A similar aim was carried out here later on, when the British army, which occupied the island during most of the 18th century, built a watchtower, possibly encouraged by the strategic conditions of the place, something which is also attested by the many bunkers which date from the Spanish Civil War.

Since the area remains undeveloped, archaeological investigations are not limited and will continue revealing more of the rich archaeological potential that Sanitja presents.

== Historiography ==
The first written source that makes reference to the city of Sanisera is the mention which Pliny the Elder makes in his book " Naturalis Historia" in the 1st century AD. However, later sources have served as clues in order to locate it. One of them consists of the portulan charts from the 16th, 17th and 18th centuries, such as the maps designed by Abraham Ortelius in the year 1590 and Petrus Bertius in 1602; the place name Sanisera appearing in many of them in different ways: Zenage, Porto Senello, Seneua, Seneli, Sa Nitja, Senige, Senitja, Seniya, Seniglles, Senigta, Cenegta, Senoli, Seniga, Seneli, Leneli, Cenega, Senege, Sauia, Sonige, Ceneglia, Zenega, Ianisera, Zenhaga or Zenega.

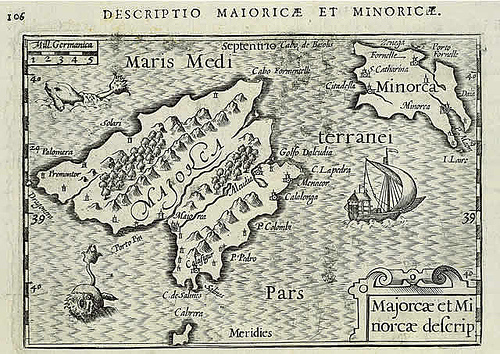
Mapa of Petrus Bertius (1602) which shows the Balearic Islands, including places names like Zenega at the north of Menorca

Apart from cartographical records, with entries for place names that appear in many different maps, it is a very different source which has helped researchers trying to identify the location of the ruins of the ancient Sanisera with the port of Sanitja. Since neither the mention of the city by Pliny nor the maps show or indicate whereabouts exactly in the island of Menorca it was located, the writings of some authors and explorers from the 18th century onwards have been able to shed light on its location. In this way, some writers while describing the area surrounding the port of Sanitja, have pointed out the existence of pottery fragments and other objects scattered on the surface, as well as some structures belonging to old buildings.

Furthermore, there are legends derived from local folklore about the place, such as the legend of "Ses Vilotes" gathered by F.Camps i Mercadal, which mentions the existence of a past population, and the fact that the names Sanisera and Sanitja are similar seems to support this hypothesis. Lastly, its location in a port presenting excellent characteristics makes one think in the logical possibility of a stable human occupation in this spot of the northernmost part of Menorca.

In recent decades, since underwater sports activities started in 1974, a great number of amphorae dating from the 1st to the 4th centuries AD started to be found and recovered from the seabed, thus proving the presence of Roman ruins in this place.

== The place name of Sanisera ==
The study of the place name of Sanisera raises some problems, since no analogous forms have been found in the Mediterranean. The work done by J.S. Hernández has shed some light on its origins and composition, without establishing a clear etymological root and possibly ruling out its Latin origin.

The name Sanisera could be made up of two elements: SANI + SERA. The first element, the alleged root Sani-, could be related to the Iberian anthroponim sani- as found in many epigraphical records., and, if that would be the case, it would be related to the Iberian language spoken in the Iberian Peninsula. However, we have not found a single analogous term to the suffix –sera in pre-Roman languages. There is a hypothetical explanation, as in the Indoeuropean there exists the root *ser-/*sor-, which means “to run, to flow”. Due to the geographical location of Sanisera, in a natural port in the northern part of the island and close to a stream of fresh water that flows into the sea, the second element could be a geographical reference.

Nevertheless, all this information is hypothetical, since the origins of the name have not been clarified yet. More research should be done in order to find out the etymology of this place name, even though few analogous forms have been found.

== Archaeological interventions ==
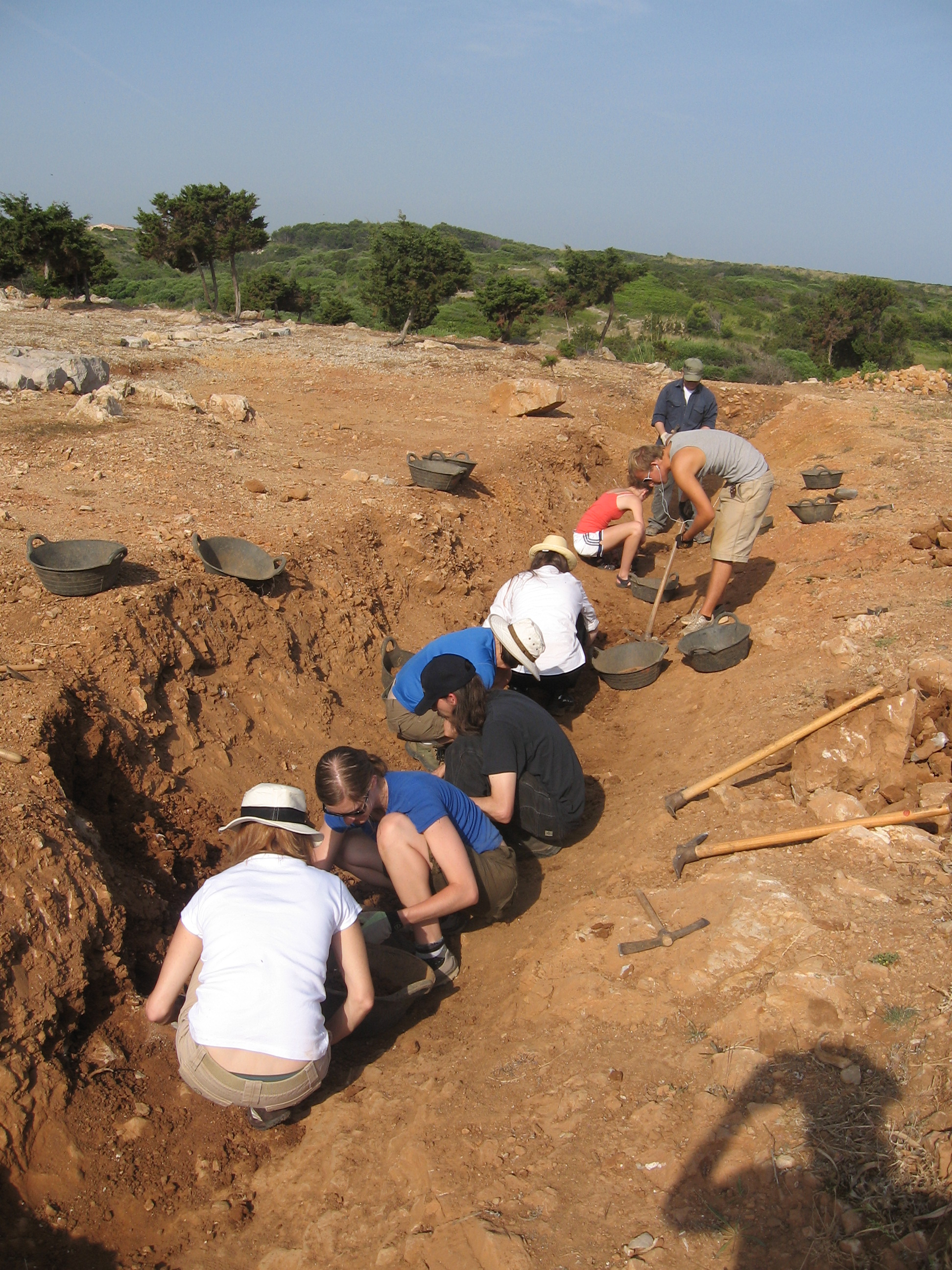
Excavation at the trench of the Roman military camp

During the ‘80s, between the years 1979 and 1984, a series of surveys and excavations which took place at the western side of the port, brought to light the first vestiges of the city of Sanisera: a building with a possible industrial usage, which demonstrate the occupation of the city approximately from the 1st century BC to the 6th century AD; with an alleged period of splendor which lasted until the 3rd century AD.

Also, between 1985 and 1987 the same team located a different building which presented graves both inside and outside its limits. Some years later, it was discovered that the building was an Early Christian basilica (See below for more information on these two buildings).

From the archaeological surveys carried out before excavations started, archaeologists found out that the extension of the Roman city was roughly 60,000 square meters.

Roughly a decade later, from 1993, the study of this site was taken up again with a series of both land and underwater surveys in order to get to know the extension of the archaeology of the port of Sanitja (See below for more information on surveys and excavations carried out from 1993 to the present in the Port of Sanitja).

From that year until the present, the area is under archaeological investigation, having brought to light a Roman military camp which dates from the times of the conquest of the Balearic Islands (123 BC.) to the east of the port, whereas current excavations are focusing on finding the extension, urbanism, function of different spaces and phases of occupation in the city of Sanisera, which is located to the west of the port.

== Terrestrial surveys and topography ==
After the excavations carried out during the ‘80s, archaeological investigations were taken up in 1993

Because the site covers a considerable area, it was divided up into plots. A plan was drawn showing all these plots, which were numbered in correlation. In this way, the selected archaeological material from the surface of the terrain would be identified according to these areas

The study of the pottery recovered from the systematic surveys of the area as well as from a private collection shed light on the chronology of the site. The oldest materials are the Punic amphorae, type Maña C and the Punic Ebussitan (PE 14, PE 17). Besides, the most recent materials collected were from North Africa: ARS D type Hayes 105 and amphora Keay LXI, dating from 450-700 AD.

From the late Republican period there was a large quantity of Dressel 1 amphorae which represent the 4% of the total of fragments collected on site (21% of all the amphorae). Apart from Italic materials, a large quantity of South Gaulish and North African productions were recorded.

From North Africa it is significant the presence of fineware: ARS productions, such as ARS A and ARS D. The most frequent types of ARS A collected during the surveys were: Hayes 3, 6, 9 and 14. Regarding ARS D, which is the most numerous variant of this category of fineware, the most frequent productions (among 48 different types) were: Hayes 91, 94, 99 and 104.

Also from North Africa there was a significant number of coarse wares (21% of the total number of ceramics recovered from the surveys). The most frequent cooking ware varieties were: Hayes 23, 185, 196 and 197. The material of North African origin represents 57.5% of the total number of ceramics from Sanitja. This corroborates the commercial relationship between Menorca and North of Africa.

Another important pottery group which was detected during the surveys is an oxidised coarse ware which comprises the 20% of the total of fragments recovered. Even though it was difficult to ascertain its origins, it could be a type of local handmade pottery or produced in the Iberian península.

From the Iberian Peninsula it is important to mention the presence of amphora from Tarraco (Tarraconenses amphora), which was produced during the first stages of the Early Empire period (around 2.9% of the total). From Southern Spain material collected included amphorae for preserving fish, Dressel 7/11 and Dressel 20, for oil (1.2% of the total).

Furthermore, in 1994 a topographical and planimetrical survey was carried out at the port of Sanitja. In this way, structures which could be seen on the surface were mapped in order to start studying the city planning and areas of significant concentrations of materials.

Find	Class	Type	Rims	Bases	Handles	No shape	Total fragments	Total individuals
Area 2	African cookware	Hayes 23b	1	0	0	0	1	1
Area 2	African cookware	Hayes 196	2	0	0	0	2	2
Area 2	African amphora	Keay 3	1	0	0	0	1	1
Area 2	African amphora	Keay 8b	1	0	0	0	1	1
Area 2	Italian amphora	Dr. 1b	1	0	0	0	1	1
Area 2	Pompeian red ware	Ind.	0	0	0	1	1	1
Area 2	Opus signinum	Ind.	0	0	0	2	2	1
Area 2	ARS D	Hayes 46,8	1	0	0	0	1	1
Area 2	ARS D	Hayes 61b	1	0	0	0	1	1
Area 2	ARS D	Hayes 80a	1	0	0	0	1	1
Area 2	ARS D	Hayes 87a	1	0	0	0	1	1
Area 2	ARS D	Hayes 99	1	0	0	0	1	1
Area 2	ARS D	Hayes 104b	2	0	0	0	2	2
Area 2	ARS D	Lamb. 60	1	0	0	0	1	1
Area 4	African cookware	Hayes 23a	1	0	0	0	1	1
Area 4	African cookware	Hayes 23b	18	0	0	0	18	18
Area 4	African cookware	Hayes 183	1	0	0	0	1	1
Area 4	African cookware	Hayes 185	6	0	0	0	6	6
Area 4	African cookware	Hayes 194	1	0	0	0	1	1
Area 4	African cookware	Hayes 195	3	0	0	0	3	3
Area 4	African cookware	Hayes 196	39	0	0	0	39	39
Area 4	African cookware	Hayes 197	22	0	0	0	22	22
Area 4	African cookware	Ostia 3,108	1	0	0	0	1	1
Area 4	African cookware	Ostia 3,324	1	0	0	0	1	1
Area 4	African amphora	Keay 1a	1	0	0	0	1	1
Area 4	African amphora	Keay 6	1	0	0	0	1	1
Area 4	African amphora	Keay 57b	2	0	0	0	2	2
Area 4	African amphora	Keay 62	5	0	0	0	5	5
Area 4	African amphora	Keay 62a	2	0	0	0	2	2
Area 4	African amphora	Keay 62g	1	0	0	0	1	1
Area 4	African amphora	Keay 62g/7	1	0	0	0	1	1
Area 4	Betic amphora	Dr. 7/11	2	0	0	0	2	2
Area 4	PE amphora	PE 24	1	0	0	0	1	1
Area 4	PE amphora	PE 25	1	0	0	0	1	1
Area 4	Tarraconenses amphora	Dr. 2/4	8	0	4	0	12	8
Area 4	Tarraconenses amphora	Pasc. 1	3	0	0	0	3	3
Area 4	Tarraconenses amphora	A TAR 1	1	0	0	0	1	1
Area 4	Campanian B	Lamb. 7	1	0	0	0	1	1
Area 4	ARS A	Hayes 3	1	0	0	0	1	1
Area 4	ARS A	Hayes 6b	7	0	0	0	7	7
Area 4	ARS A	Hayes 6c	6	0	0	0	6	6
Area 4	ARS A	Hayes 8	2	0	0	0	2	2
Area 4	ARS A	Hayes 9a	4	0	0	0	4	4
Area 4	ARS A	Hayes 14/17	12	0	0	0	12	12
Area 4	ARS A	Lamb. 20	1	0	0	0	1	1
Area 4	ARS C	Hayes 72	1	0	0	0	1	1
Area 4	ARS D	Hayes 12/11	1	0	0	0	1	1
Area 4	ARS D	Hayes 58	1	0	0	0	1	1
Area 4	ARS D	Hayes 63	1	0	0	0	1	1
Area 4	ARS D	Hayes 64	2	0	0	0	2	2
Area 4	ARS D	Hayes 67	2	0	0	0	2	2
Area 4	ARS D	Hayes 69	2	0	0	0	2	2
Area 4	ARS D	Hayes 76	1	0	0	0	1	1
Area 4	ARS D	Hayes 91	3	0	0	0	3	3
Area 4	ARS D	Hayes 94	2	0	0	0	2	2
Area 4	ARS D	Hayes 99	9	0	0	0	9	9
Area 4	ARS D	Hayes 103b	2	0	0	0	2	2
Area 4	ARS D	Hayes 104a	4	0	0	0	4	4
Area 4	ARS D	Hayes 104b	3	0	0	0	3	3
Area 4	ARS D	Lamb. 58	1	0	0	0	1	1
Area 4	ARS D	Lamb. 60	1	0	0	0	1	1
Area 4	Italian T.S.	Goud. 17/18	1	0	0	0	1	1
Area 4	Italian T.S.	Goud. 27	2	0	0	0	2	2
Area 4	Italian T.S.	Goud. 36a	1	0	0	0	1	1
Area 4	Late Roman C	Lamb. 1/3	1	0	0	0	1	1
Area 4	South Gaul T.S.	Drag. 24/25	1	0	0	0	1	1
Area 4	South Gaul T.S.	Drag. 27	1	0	0	0	1	1
Area 4	South Gaul T.S.	Drag. 35/36	3	0	0	0	3	3
Area 4	South Gaul T.S.	Drag. 37	1	0	0	0	1	1

== The Underwater Archaeology of the Port of Sanitja ==
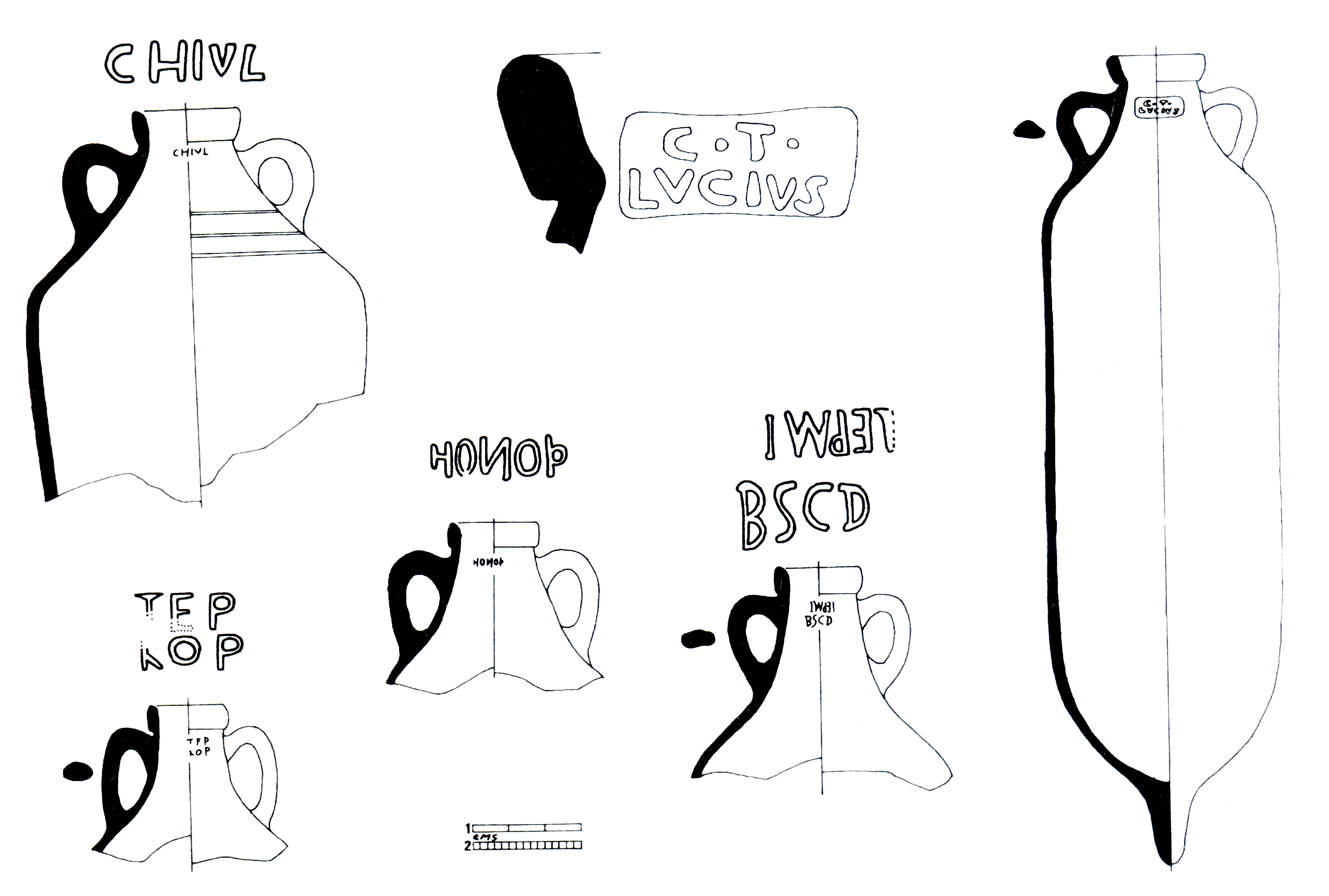
Amphorae with stamps studied by Nicolás.

The first archaeological materials studied from the area were recovered from the seabed. This happened in 1974, when the first scuba diving clubs were set on the island. A series of amphorae dating from the 1st to the 4th centuries AD started to be found and recovered from the seabed, thus proving the presence of Roman ruins in this place. Five years later, the first underwater survey was carried out. Some of the amphora rims which were found presented stamps. Two of them read LEPMI BSCD and TEP/LOP. Also, some Late Empire amphorae (Dressel 26) were found. During the following years some archaeologists and historians from the island published articles on amphorae and different types of ceramics recovered from different underwater sites in Menorca. Some of the amphorae types which were identified were PE 17, 25 y 26. Also J.C. de Nicolás wrote about the Roman anchors found in Menorca, where he mentioned an anchor stock from Sanitja which weighed 26 kilograms.

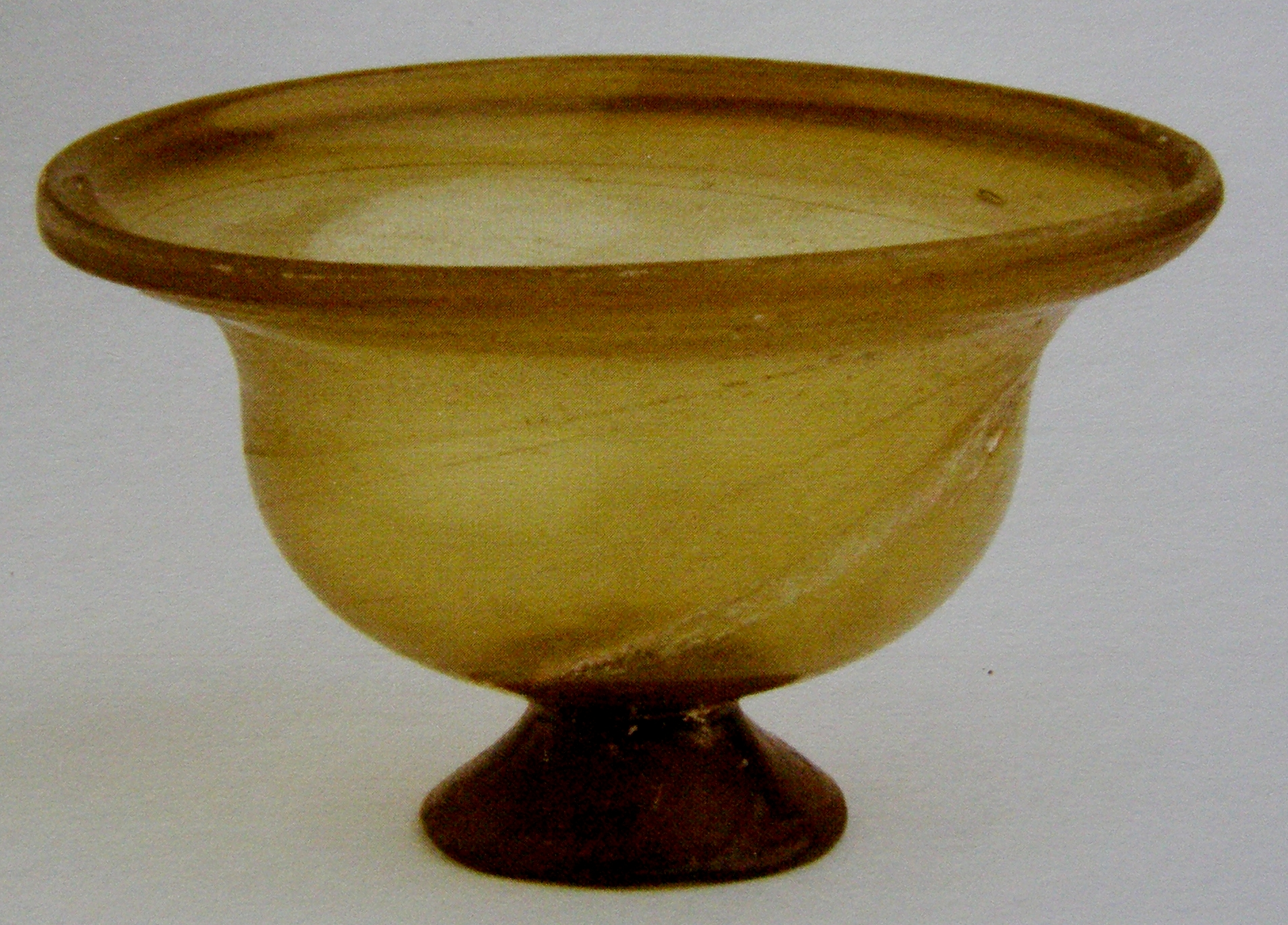
Intact Roman glass cup from Sanitja. Type Vessberg C. I/III

In 1994, an underwater visual inspection was carried out, where some materials were identified and topographically recorded, including isolated materials (anchor sites). Some of them were recovered, including an intact inkwell from South Gaul (type Hermet 18). Also, a group of six anchors were found and a map was compiled in order to show their location. Four of them were Roman, while the other two were possibly Medieval or post-Medieval. Also, it is worth mentioning that in 1999 a well preserved glass vessel was found, which dated from Imperial Roman times (Vessberg type C. I/II). This vessel must have been transported on board a ship.

A different survey was performed in 2001, combining remote sensing techniques such as side scan sonar and an echo sounder with visual survey by archeologist divers. The results shed more light on the submerged archaeology of the area, since thirteen amphora clusters were located as well as five more anchors. These and the six found in 1994 add up to a total of eleven identified anchors from different periods. Regarding amphorae, these findings confirmed the long occupation of the Roman city, from the 2nd century BC until the 6th century AD, and the intense maritime trade which took place in this part of the Mediterranean. The amphorae presented different typologies which ranged from Republican times (Italian Amphorae from Campania, such as Dressel 1) to the Early Empire (Betic amphorae, such as Dressel 20) and the Late Empire period (African amphorae, such as AFR 2d).

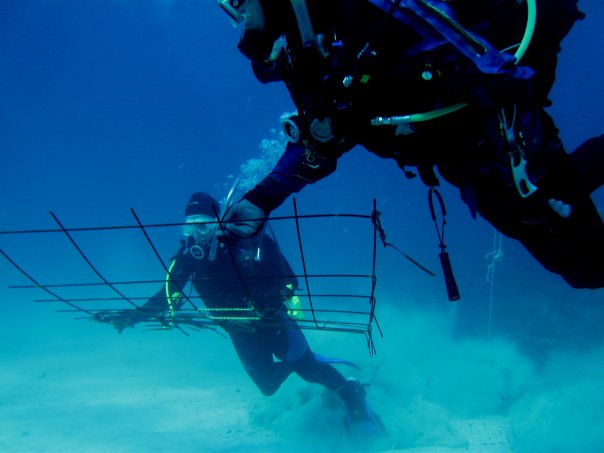
Underwater Archaeology in the Port of Sanitja

From 2006, underwater archaeological surveys are regularly taking place in the area. The diver-based surveys aim at identifying the already known artifacts and sites’ limits, as well as previously undetected features, with the related tasks of compiling a topographic map of the seabed, documenting and fully recording all the elements found, evaluating their preservation and protection, etc. Further features haven been located, such as Roman amphorae clusters, anchors and lead stocks, as well as other features of Modern times, such as post-1700 anchors and others of indeterminate periods such as stone anchors and other potential metal anchors. In 2009, a number of artifacts (amphorae and stone anchors) were recovered from the seabed to ensure their safety and allow a detailed archaeological analysis to be carried out. Also, a series of Modern period shipwrecks are being investigated, including elements like framing timbers, planking timbers and ceiling timbers. All the remains which lie at the sea bottom can explain a great deal of information about key factors such as sea-crossing, external influences, economy, trade and migration patterns in the northern coast of Menorca.

== Roman occupation of the port of Sanitja ==
=== Roman Military Camp (123 B. C. – 50 B. C.) ===
In 123 BC., the general Quintus Caecilius Metellus Balearicus (son of Quintus Caecilius Metellus Macedonicus) initiated the conquest of the Balearic Islands, which were inhabited by the native population of the island which formed the Talayotic society. Having been previously ignored by Rome, the islands became a problem in order to hold dominion of the Mediterranean, since due to the lack of military control, they became infested with pirates which affected the distribution of italic products to the western basin of the Mediterranean Sea. The origin of these pirates is unknown, and they could have been the native inhabitants themselves, those of the Talayotic society, represented by the figure of the Balearic slinger so well known in the Mediterranean, since they played a very important role in the Punic Wars between Rome and Carthage as mercenaries in the Carthaginian army. Some written sources describe this fact, such as Strabo:

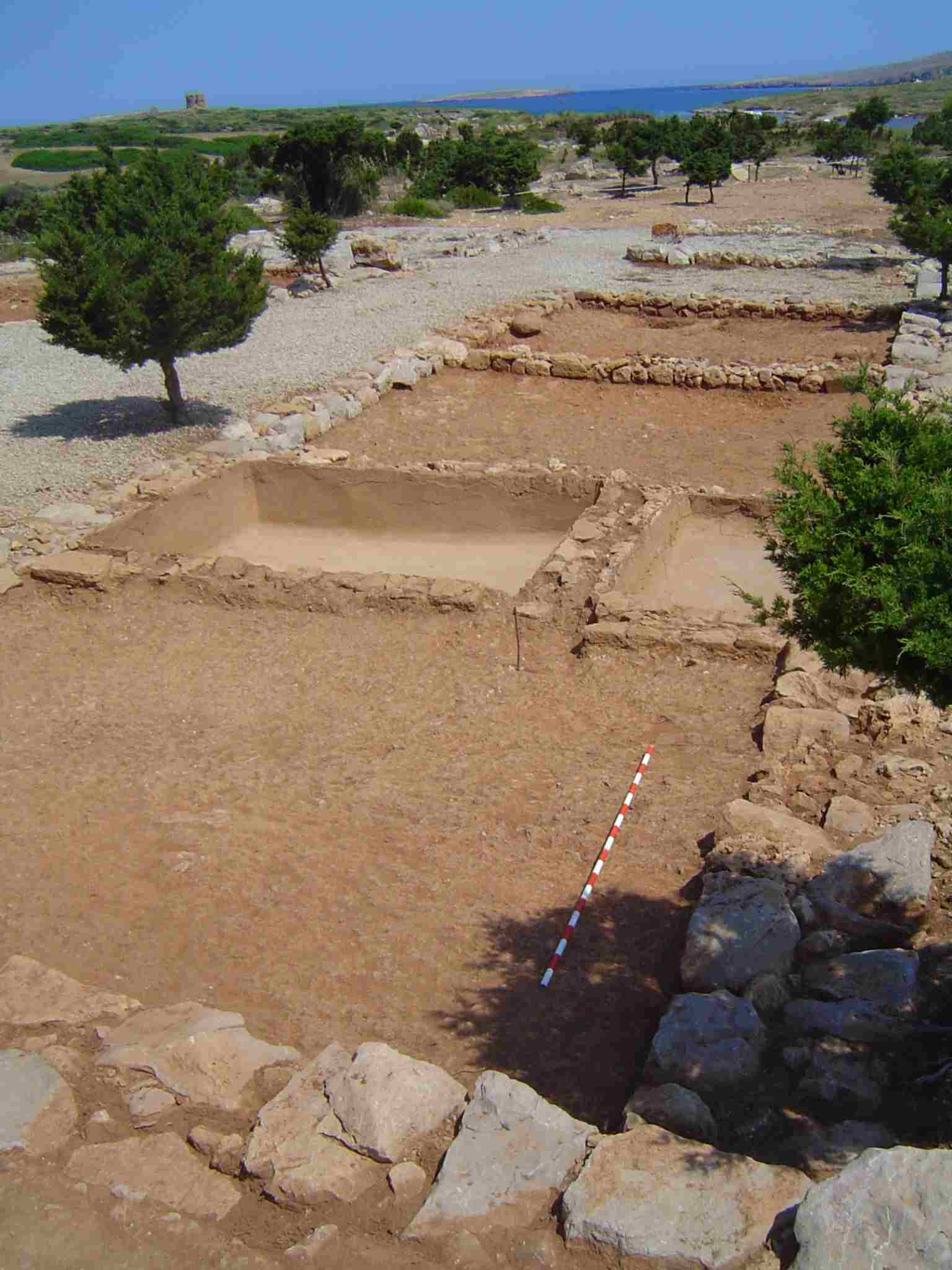
Barracks inside the Roman military camp at Sanitja

[…] Because of the land’s fertility the inhabitants are peaceful, the same as those from Ebussus (Ibiza). However, when a few bad ones got together with the sea pirates, everyone got the bad reputation and Metellus the Balearicus conquered them and founded the cities there. It was due to this fertility that they were attacked, even if they were peaceful, and were famous for being the best slingers…They train in the use of the slings from childhood in such manner that the children were not given bread to eat until they were able to hit it with their slings. For this reason, on approaching the islands, he ordered animal hides to be extended over the decks (of the ships) to protect them from their sling shot. He took three thousand Romans from Iberia as colonizers [...].

Due to this problem related to piracy, even though this might have been a pretext for proceeding with the annexation of the islands to the Roman Republic (for these possible reasons: in order to get new territories for the creation of new cities and colonies in strategic points with fertile lands for agriculture; due to the presence of the skillful Balearic slingers who could serve as mercenaries in the Roman army; for the establishment of commercial routes, which at the same time enhanced a better control of the Mediterranean; apart from questions regarding power, honour, prestige and glory that a general belonging to a family like the Metellus clan needed to reach in order to strengthen his supremacy over the rest members of the Roman aristocracy), the Senate decided to start the Conquest of the Islands, led by the consul Metellus, which was carried out in two years, after which they formed part of the province of Hispania Citerior or Nearer Hispania. In 121 BC., Quintus Caecilius Metellus went back to Rome in order to receive the honours for his successful triumph, getting the nickname ‘the Balearicus’. In these two years a military garrison was established in the port of Sanitja, which is located at the south end of the port, in the highest point (c. 15–20 meters high). Metellus, considering the place to be an important strategic enclave, built a military settlement which included defensive towers placed near the coastline in order to control the entrance of vessels into the port as well as dominate most of the northern coast of the island. Once the conquest came to an end, the military camp continued being use until around 45 BC., something which is attested by some reorganizations of the space and the presence of pottery and other elements which date from the time of the Conquest to the middle of the 1st century BC. On many occasions, the Roman military camp at Sanitja could have participated in the events that took place in the Iberian Peninsula, such as rebellions and civil wars in which the islands got involved with the decisive participation of their armies including the Balearic slingers. One of these episodes is framed in the context of the so-called Sertorian Wars between Sulla and Sertorius, which took place in Hispania between 83 and 72 BC.). Around the same time, there is evidence of the military camp at Sanitja continued being used in a subsequent phase of occupation. After other possible uses of this military camp, the abandonment of the military camp could have taken place around the year 45 BC., when Caesar reorganized the Roman army. Moreover, the Balearic Islands and most of the peninsula enjoyed a period of peace in which the Romanization of the native population might have taken place.

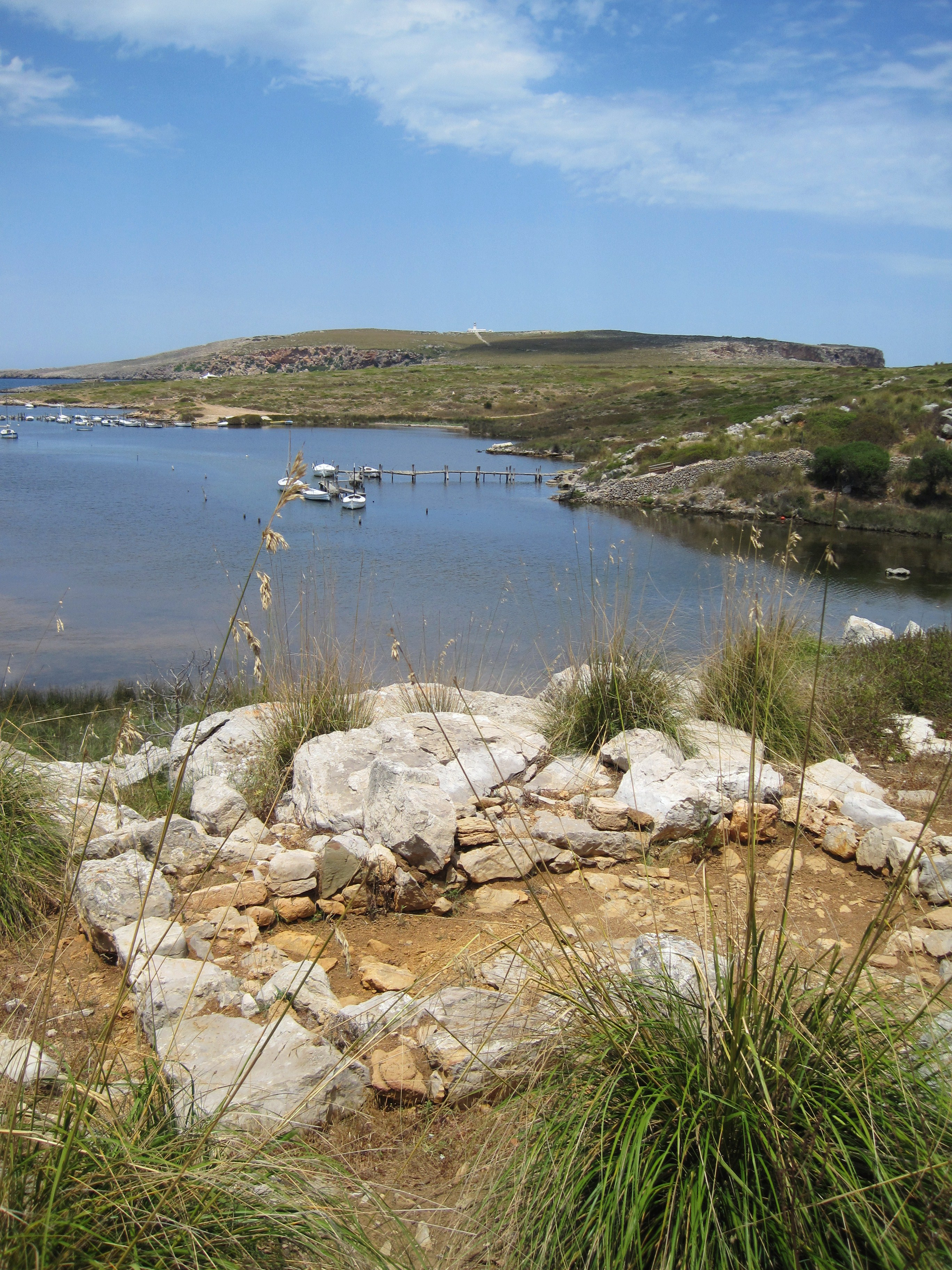
View of the eastern side of the Port of Sanitja, from one of the structures belonging to the Roman military camp

In this way, the military camp at Sanitja turned out to be an important focal point not only during the conquest of the Balearic Islands carried out between 123 and 121 BC., but also in other key moments of the late Republican period, amidst an environment characterized by several disputes among senatorial members, until a period of relative peace was established in times of Caesar in the middle of the 1st century BC. Part of the importance of this military camp would be given by its strategic location and the native element in the army, since part of it was composed of Balearic slingers. In this way, in a military camp presenting a series of barracks and other spaces for the carrying-out of different daily activities (“soldiers in charge of healing wounds after the trainings, the tailoring of the military attire, the mending of boots, the melting of lead for the production of bullets, the maintenance of equipment […]”, and surrounded by a defensive system formed by a trench, Roman soldiers, such as lancers (hastate) and infantry (principe), along with native slingers (auxiliae) would have lived and trained together. These slingers would have been trained and instructed in the camp in order to learn the Roman military tactics, as well as to adopt, to some extent, the Roman customs and way of living.

Due to its location in a port, the provision of food, wine and other goods for the camp was brought by sea, thanks to vessels with cargoes consisting in amphorae containing food and liquids, such as fish, wheat, wine, olive oil, etc.; which would follow maritime routes around the western basin of the Mediterranean, from Ostia to Menorca. This permanent provision of goods through the sea, caused the arriving of different people who participated in the process of supplying for the Roman army, such as sailors and tradesmen, who could have started to settle down in the area surrounding the camp in a more or less permanent way. Along with them, the presence of a garrison in Sanitja, would have attracted to other people, such as craftsmen, prostitutes, magicians, tavern workers, native population and veteran soldiers; who could have started to live in the vicinity of the camp, and in this way forming an improvised settlement of civilian population in the port of Sanitja.

=== Development of the City of Sanisera (1st century BC – 6th century AD?) ===
==== Roman Period (1st century BC - 5th century AD) ====
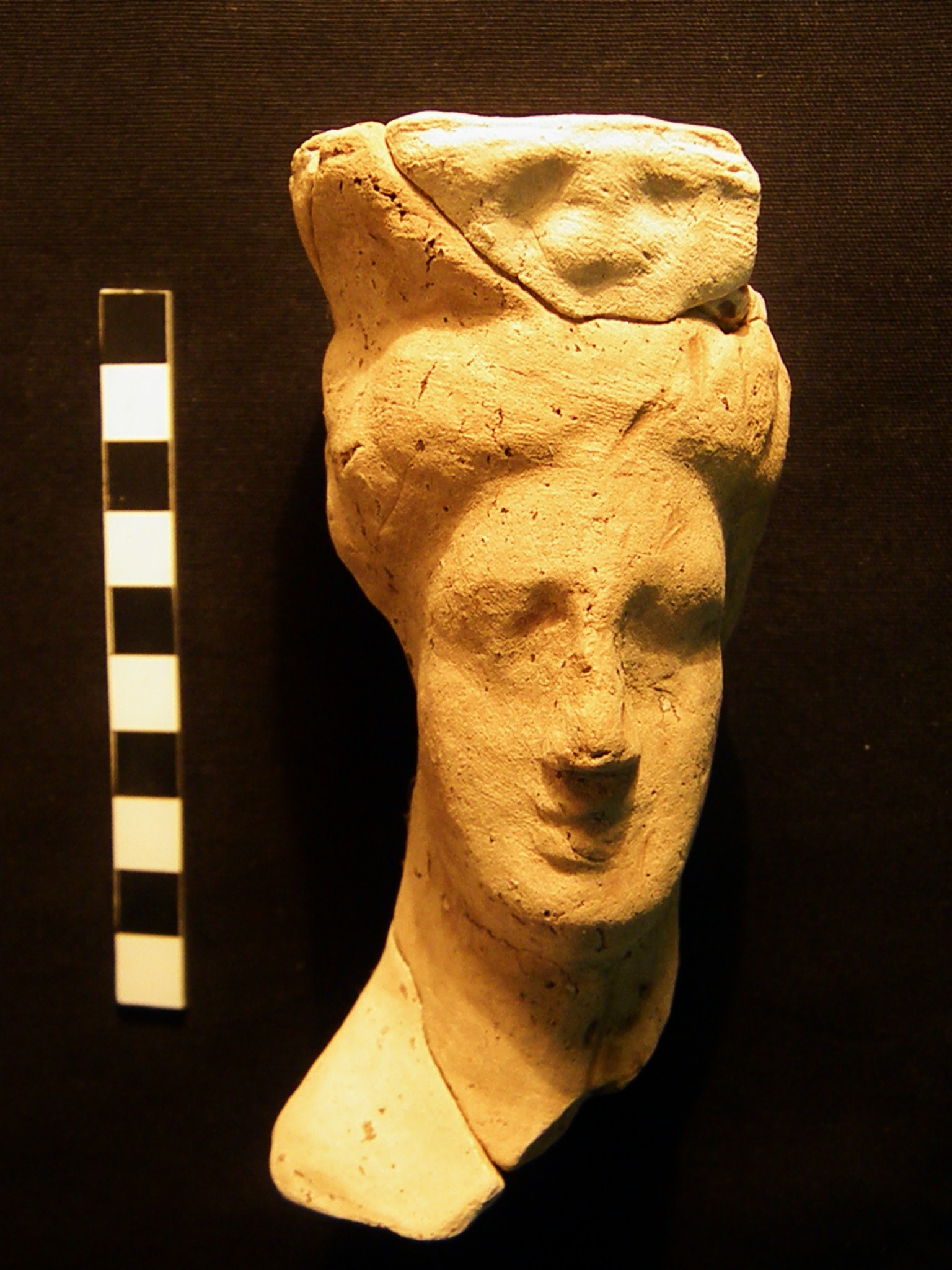
Punic incense-burner representing goddess Tanit, which was found in the Roman city of Sanisera

This improvised bunch of people gathered in houses which lacked any form of urban planning, and which was located in the surroundings of the military camp, a "cannabae", would have been gradually growing and becoming more organized until it turned out to be the "civitas" of Sanisera mentioned by Pliny. Thus, at some point after the establishment of the Roman army at Sanitja, the civilian settlement would have started to be created, and as the population grew, it would have started to adopt some sort of organization at the eastern side of the port. The wide chronology of the city shows that it became a stable and permanent settlement which ended up adopting the status of a city, and in which economic and subsistence activities of different nature, such as farming, herding and fishing, were developed. The archaeological investigations have been able to determine an area measuring approximately 14 acres (57,000 m^{2}) of perimeter, which would represent the largest expansion of the city in its peak period (which could have taken place around the 1st and 3rd centuries AC). An important factor for the development of the city of Sanisera was its coastal location in an excellent natural port, which made it become a Roman portuary city protected from bad weather conditions, and that it could have held a relevant role in the maritime trade of the western basin of the Mediterranean. This transportation of goods from and to the city is attested by pottery and other artifacts produced in places out of the island of Menorca, which have been found both in the city and the port's seabed. During and after the Crisis of the Third Century which affected all the territories belonging to the Roman Empire, Sanisera started to decay as well, shrinking both its perimeter and population, and, probably modifying the distribution of the different spaces still in use, which would have caused major changes in the urbanism. Among some of those, it would have been possible to find in areas of domestic use the introduction of zones of production for the self-sufficiency and/or supplying and distribution of products on a small scale. Nevertheless, this decay would have not meant a total breaking-off of the relations with other parts of the Mediterranean, since the site presents different types of pottery dating from that late Empire period which arrived from places such as Northern Africa.

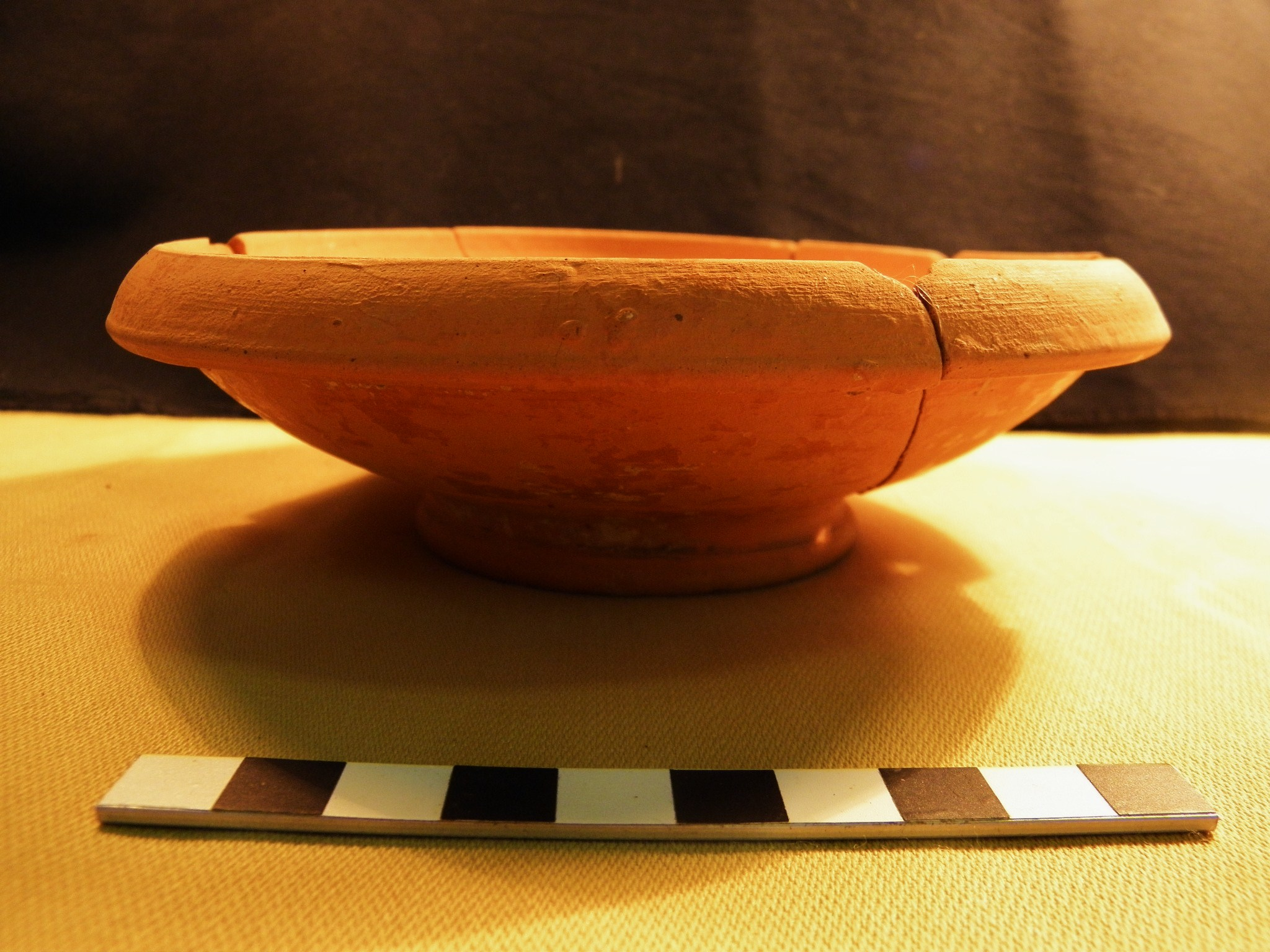
ARS-D bowl, type Hayes 99, from Sanisera (6th century AD)

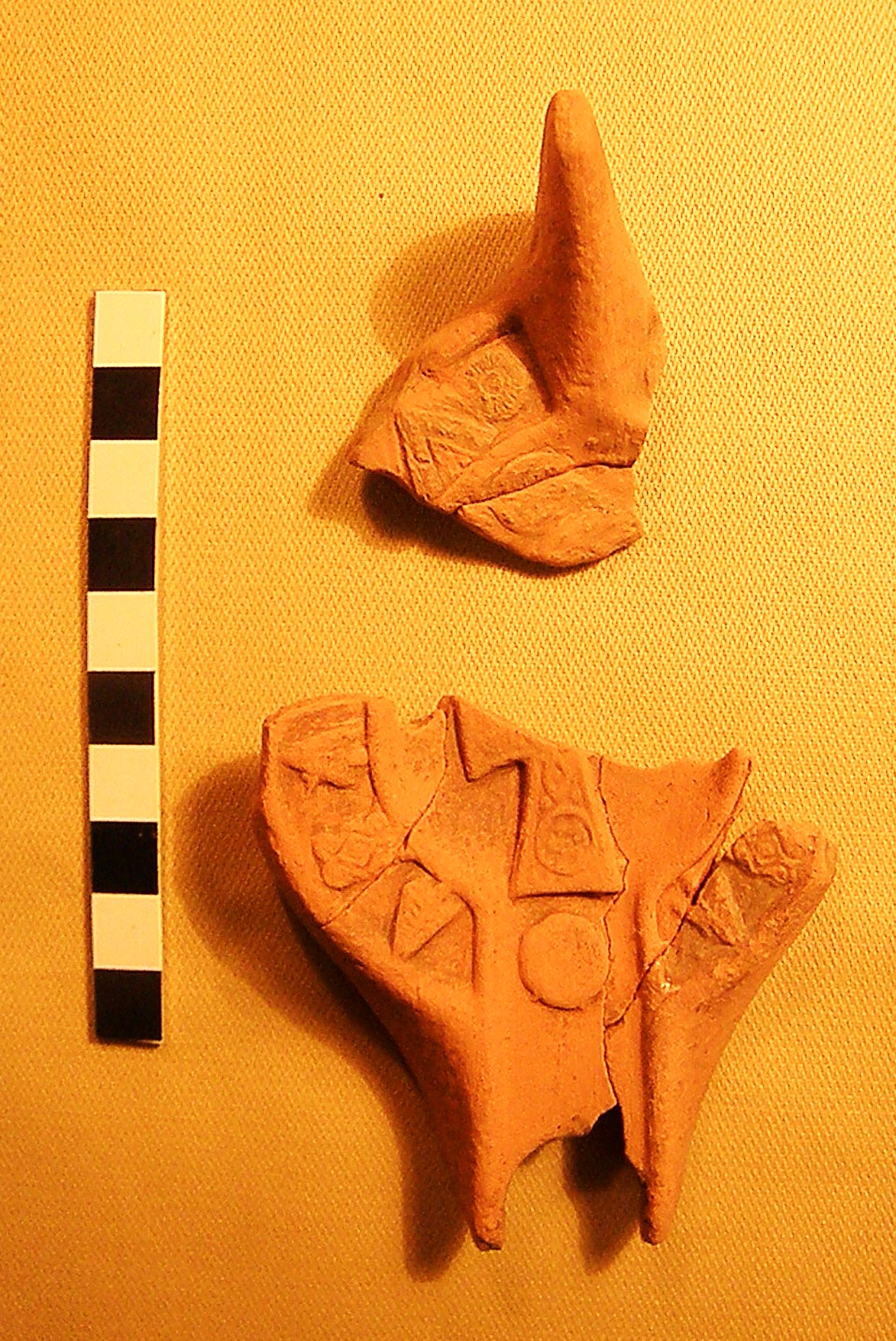
Early Christian oil lamp, type Hayes II, from Sanisera (5th-6th centuries AD)

==== Late Antiquity ====
After the Fall of Rome, Menorca was conquered by Vandals in the 5th century AD and Byzantines in the following century. Even though it is still unknown the impact of this two cultures on Sanitja, materials which date from both periods have been recovered. This means that during the 5th and 6th centuries AD there was an intense commerce which arrived at the Port of Sanitja. This can be stated due to the presence of pottery such as ARS D (African red slip ware D), DSP (Dérivée de sigilée paléochrétienne), Late Roman C, Early Christian oil lamps, Late Ebussitan ware and a group of handmade productions which could be possibly local or from the east of the Iberian peninsula. Connections between Menorca and North Africa (which existed during Roman times) continued after the Roman period and they were even intensified by the trade routes.

From the last phase of the Roman Empire and Late Antiquity archaeological investigations have revealed different buildings:

===== 1. Building C (4th-6th centuries AD) =====
This structure was excavated during the early '80s. Archaeologists revealed a building which consisted of 8 rectangular rooms, known as Building C. Some of them were used as storage rooms, while other presented a press for the production of local wine. This press consisted of a system of interconnected cisterns, which were lined by opus signinum. However, it can be thought that the cisterns were used for the production of purple dye or salted fish. The building was occupied between 450 and 524 AD. In one of the rooms (C14) 5 large African amphorae (RITA, 1984: 44) and a fragment of marble altar table were found. (RITA, 1997: 79). The pavement was made up of a layer of very compacted clay. Also, several stone slabs were recorded which marked to entrances to the different rooms. Some years later, the most significant materials recovered from the excavation of Building C and its surroundings were published.

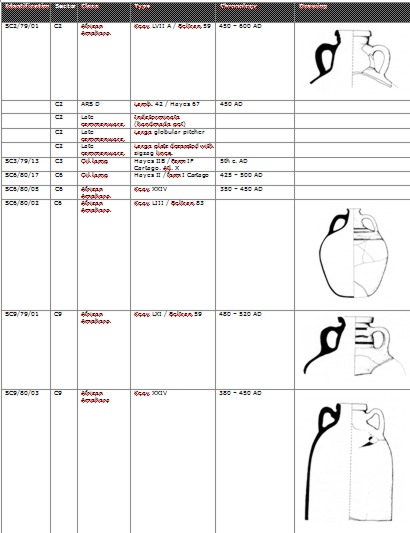
Significant materials recovered from the excavations of Building C

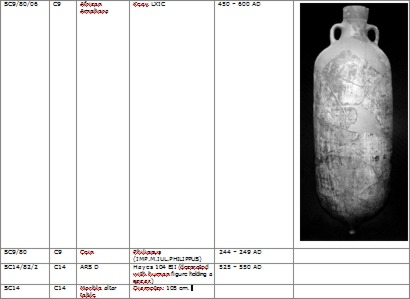
Significant materials recovered from the excavations of Building C

===== 2. Early Christian Basilica =====
After the excavation of building C, the same team started to investigate an area where there was a large concentration of materials as well as a monolithic stone sarcophagus on the surface. Archaeologists located a building with rectangular rooms and Opus signinum pavements that presented a cluster of tombs both inside and outside its limits.

The four tombs located inside the building (underneath its pavement) were of the cista type (rectangular pits lined by stone slabs). Also, 21 cist tombs were excavated in its surroundings, all of them containing single burials (except one tombs that presented a multiple inhumation). All the tombs shared the same characteristics: they did not present any type of grave goods and the individuals were lying in supine position.

However, the building remained partially excavated and, for this reason, they could not ascertain what type of structure was. Years later, due to natural weathering in the area, a semicircular apse has been revealed. For this reason it can be stated that the building was an Early Christian basilica, possibly dating from the late 4th and early 5th centuries AD.

This religious building could have been built in the last years of the Roman Empire, when Christianity became the state religion of the Empire during the 4th century. Bearing possible African and Syrian influences, it presents an east–west orientation and a rectangular plan, which is divided into three naves, the central and widest one finishing with a semicircular apse at its head. The existence of a religious building like this would indicate the continuity of some degree of importance of the city of Sanisera as an administrative and political centre; and represents further evidence in the island of Menorca of the ferver acceptance of the new religion around the 4th and 5th centuries.

===== 3. Ecclesiastical complex =====
Excavations carried out between 2008 and 2010 have revealed an ecclesiastical complex at the west side of the port of Sanitja. This complex, which possibly dates from the 6th century AD, consists of a basilica and a large multi-functional building, called Building 10. This building presents a series of rooms, some of them used as stores, deposits and cisterns, while others were bedrooms, kitchens, latrines, dining-rooms and courtyards.

This type of complexes were very common during the Late Antiquity period, with examples all around the Mediterranean. They usually included stables, baptismal fonts, baths, hospitals, hostels and even second houses for bishops. Many of them presented more than one basilica, such as the complex of Francolí in Tarragona, Spain, and San Giusto in Apulia, Italy. This is also the case of Sanitja, since the basilica excavated between 1985 and 1987 is located in the proximity of the newly found structures. Future excavations will determine the whole organization of the space and the relation between the two basílicas, as well as other possible buildings and necropoleis.

Other sites of similar characteristics and chronology are: El Bovalar (Lleida, Catalonia, Spain) which presents a basilica next to a building that could have served as monastery or unit of production; Mount Gelato outside Rome, with a basilica and several buildings including baths, courtyards, cisterns and baptistery; San Pietro in Canosa di Puglia (Italy), with a basilica, guesthouse for pilgrims and second residence of the bishop; Son Peretó and Illa del Rei, in Mallorca and Menorca respectively. The two last sites present basilicas and buildings, as well as tombs located in its surroundings. The former examples are ecclesiastical centers which were located outside the city limits. From the Late Antiquity period there are also religious centers inside the Roman cities, such as the complexes in Tolmo de Minateda (Albacete), Tarragona, Barcelona, Terrassa and Valencia among others, all of them nowadays located in Spain.

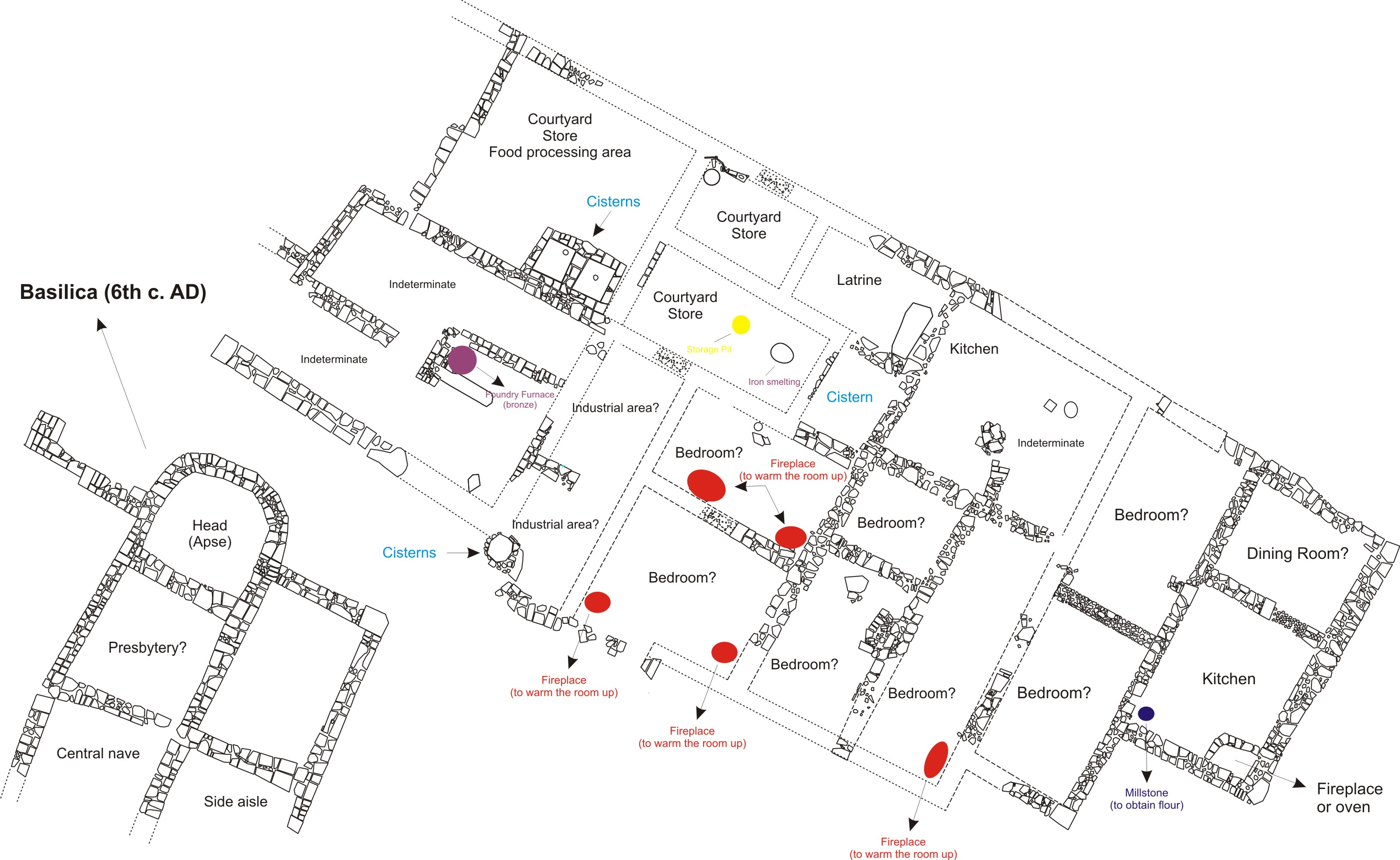
Map of the ecclesiastical complex excavated between 2008 and 2010 in the Port of Sanitja, showing Building C (possible guesthouse or monastery) and the basilica

Whereas Building 10 started to be revealed in 2008, the second basilica was found in 2010. A semicircular apse, a presbytery and 3 naves (central nave and two aisles) have been recorded so far. It presents well-preserved masonry blocks, which were nicely worked. This and the basilica found in the 1980s point to the importance of the area during the 5th and 6th centuries AD, when population living in the surroundings must have gathered there. Complexes of this type were often built, both inside and outside the city limits, due to the presence of saints’ relics, which might have caused the desire to visit the place and even be buried near them. Also, the constant arrival of pilgrims that might have gone to the complex in order to visit the relics could have caused the necessity of building a guesthouse. However, Building 10 could have also been a monastery located next to the basilica.

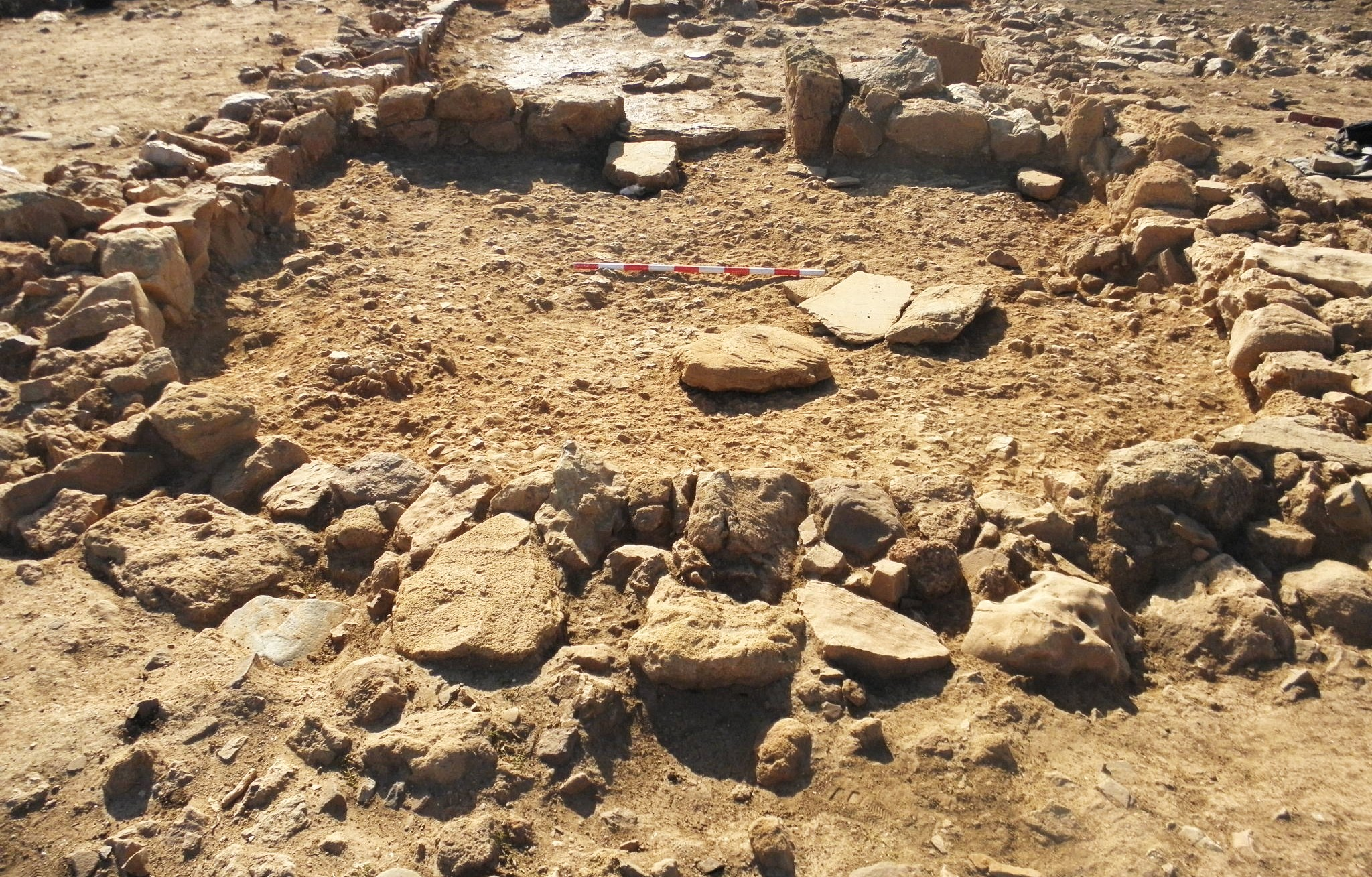
Semicircular apse after it was excavated in 2011

Be that as it may, the presence of a complex presenting these characteristics shows the high degree of organization that Christianity experienced in Menorca during the 5th and 6th centuries AD.

2011 excavations continued to revealed more of this important building. So far the areas which have been completely excavated show evidence that the floors presented pavements consisting of stone slabs. Also, the new exposed walls continued to present big masonry blocks and a great width. Partition walls were also located inside the two naves: the central and the left naves, resulting in two separate rooms in each of them. Regarding the apse's base, it is slightly higher than the rest of the naves of the building, which indicates the importance of this part of the basilica. Having found the wall that presents the limits of the basilica at its Eastern side, part of an exterior wall has been found, which is parallel to and just three meters away from this Eastern limit of the building. Future excavations between the two mentioned walls will determine the function of this space. Also, it will be found out if the exterior wall is an outer wall that could be enclosing the basilica and, perhaps, the entire ecclesiastical complex.

An important characteristic which was noticed in this basilica is that it presents different construction and occupation phases. There is a total of three different construction phases: The first one belongs to some walls from a previous building which was in the same location before the basilica was built. During the construction of the basilica, some parts of the previous building were reused. The second corresponds to the moment when the basilica was built and use as a church, roughly from the middle of the 5th century. The third and last phase is characterized by the partition of some areas in order to create smaller rooms used for domestic purposes. This is attested by the presence of domestic structures such as hearths and amphorae used for the storage of goods. This last phase would have taken place once the building stopped being used as a church and was reused by the locals to make different domestic activities inside.

As for the findings, pottery from the 5th and 6th centuries AD continued to be found, including African productions such as ARS D vessels and ARS oil lamps, D.S.P. from Gaul and Late Roman C from Phocea, as well as a big amount of coarse wares of local production. Also, some personal items such as glass-paste beads, pendants and belt buckle pins have been found, all of them presenting the same chronology as the pottery finds. Also, it is the same type of personal items that have been found at the necropolis (see information below).

===== 4. Necropolis 6 =====
Between 2008 and 2011 a necropolis was excavated in the surroundings of the Port of Sanitja. It consists of 44 tombs that form several rows with passageways between rows and tombs. The majority of these tombs are of the cist type. However, there are two simple pit tombs and one amphora tomb.

The tombs were rectangular pits cut into the calcareous bedrock and then lined with tiles and covered with stone slabs. The tomb cut and stone slab covers were both noted to be of a rough, unrefined workmanship. They follow an east–west orientation, typical of the Christian burial rite, with the head placed at the west end. The tombs contained multiple and single burials, generally in a supine-extended position. The presence of multiple burials were due to the reuse of the tombs, deliberately moving interred individuals to the sides of the tombs in order to make room for subsequent inhumations. Even following disturbance by tomb robbing activity, the cranium tends to remain at the west end of the tomb, no matter the extent of the disturbance of the rest of the skeletal or corporal remains; most probably a sign of respect for and recognition of the individual(s) interred. In some cases deposits of disarticulated remains have been found and suggest that the tombs could have also served as ossuaries.

A minimum number of individuals for the work carried out during the 2008 - 2011 seasons, on tombs 1-44 from Necropolis 6, has been determined as two hundred and fifty, apart from the vast number of disarticulated bones and teeth.

There is a minimal representation of perinates and babies, most probably because there was some level of discrimination in the burial of infants within the community funerary space (as is often seen in necropoles of Early and Late antiquity dates). Also, analysis carried out to the skeletal remains showed that mortality rate increases dramatically during early childhood and it remains quite high throughout the later sub-adult years. Adult mortality is also high in this population, with a very low representation of older adults, making the life expectancy fairly low (between 31–40 years). Similar high indices of mortality are seen in other Roman era populations experiencing high levels of epidemic disease and where medical knowledge was limited. In the adult group, males and females show almost equal percentages of mortality. Regarding pathologies, the three most common conditions observed in the skeletal remains analysed from necropolis 6 were dental calculus, joint disease and non-specific infection, and this is typical for a rural, non-industrialised population.

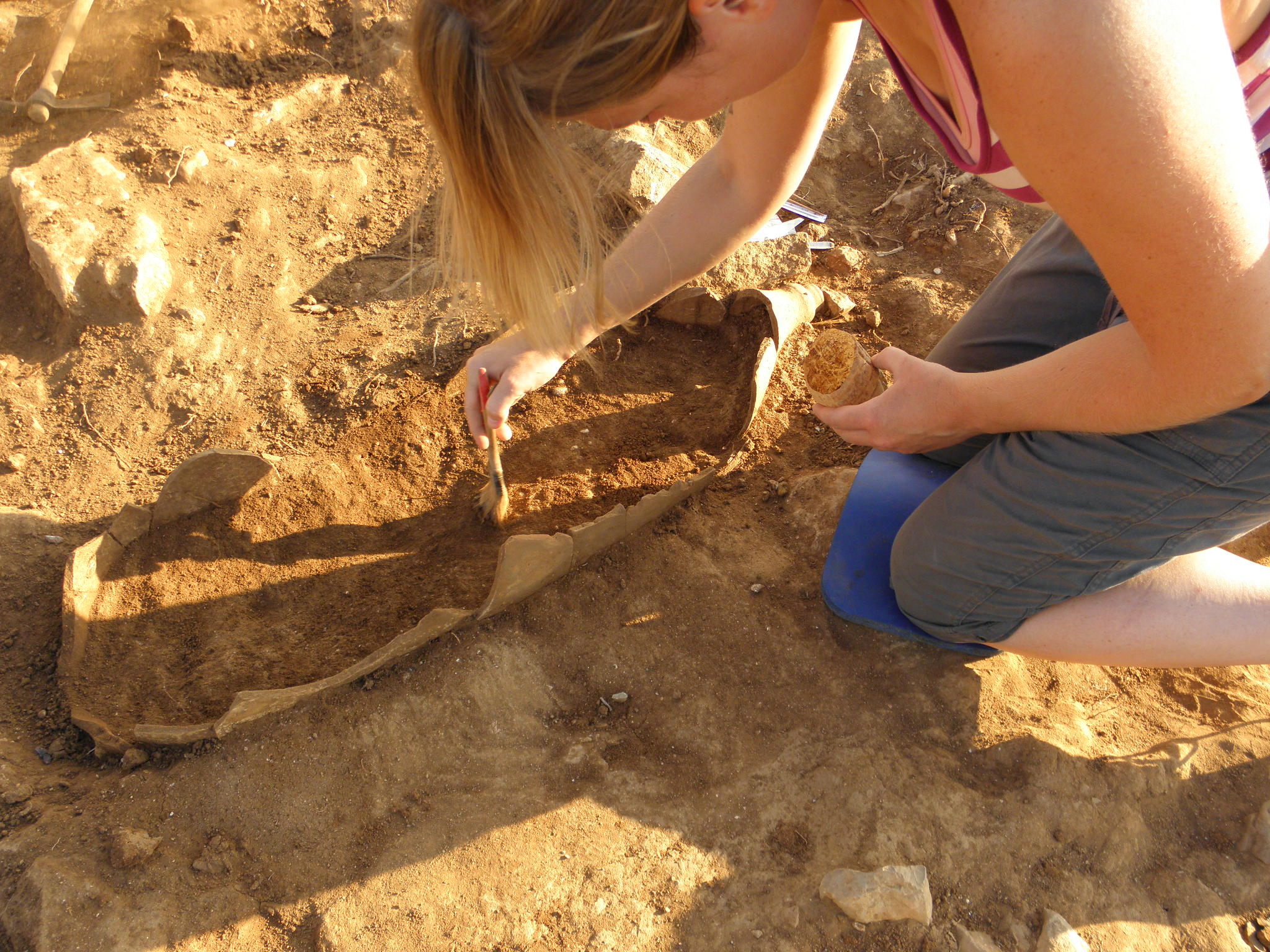
Excavation of tomb 42: an African amphora containing the remains of a child

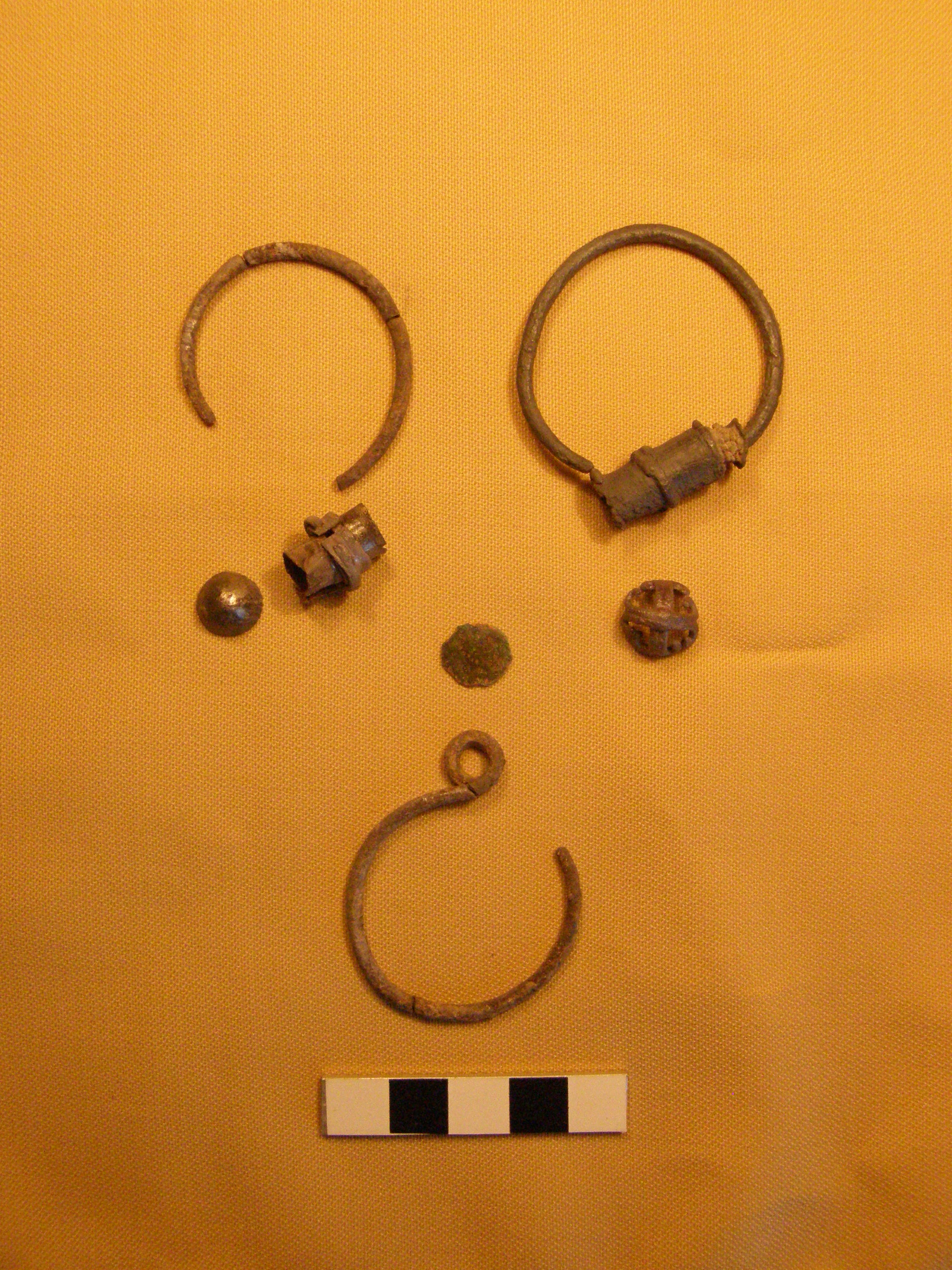
Silver hoop earrings from tomb 12 (6th century AD)

It is important to mention that in 2011 an amphora tomb, identified as tomb 42, was found in this necropolis. The amphora, African in origin, contained the remains of a one-year-old child. This type of graves, along with the cist tombs, are usually found in this type of Late Antique necropolis.

As for grave goods, personal ítems have been found in some of the tombs. They include earrings, rings, pendants, ceramic beads, glass paste beads and clothes pins. The key features missing to provide us with a more concrete date and a more concrete cultural influence are brooches, cloak pins and belt buckles. Most of the materials recovered from the graves date from the 6th century AD and are comparable to objects located in other Late Antiquity necropolei from the Iberian Peninsula and the Balearic Islands. Without being able to ascertain if the interred population was of Hispano-Roman, Vandal, Byzantine or Visigoth origin, it can be asserted that Necropolis 6 contained the remains of a population living in or around the Port of Sanitja during the 6th century AD. Among the most frequently found materials, it is worth mentioning the bronze and silver hoop earrings, bronze rings and glass paste beads of different shapes and sizes, some of them even reused from Punic times.

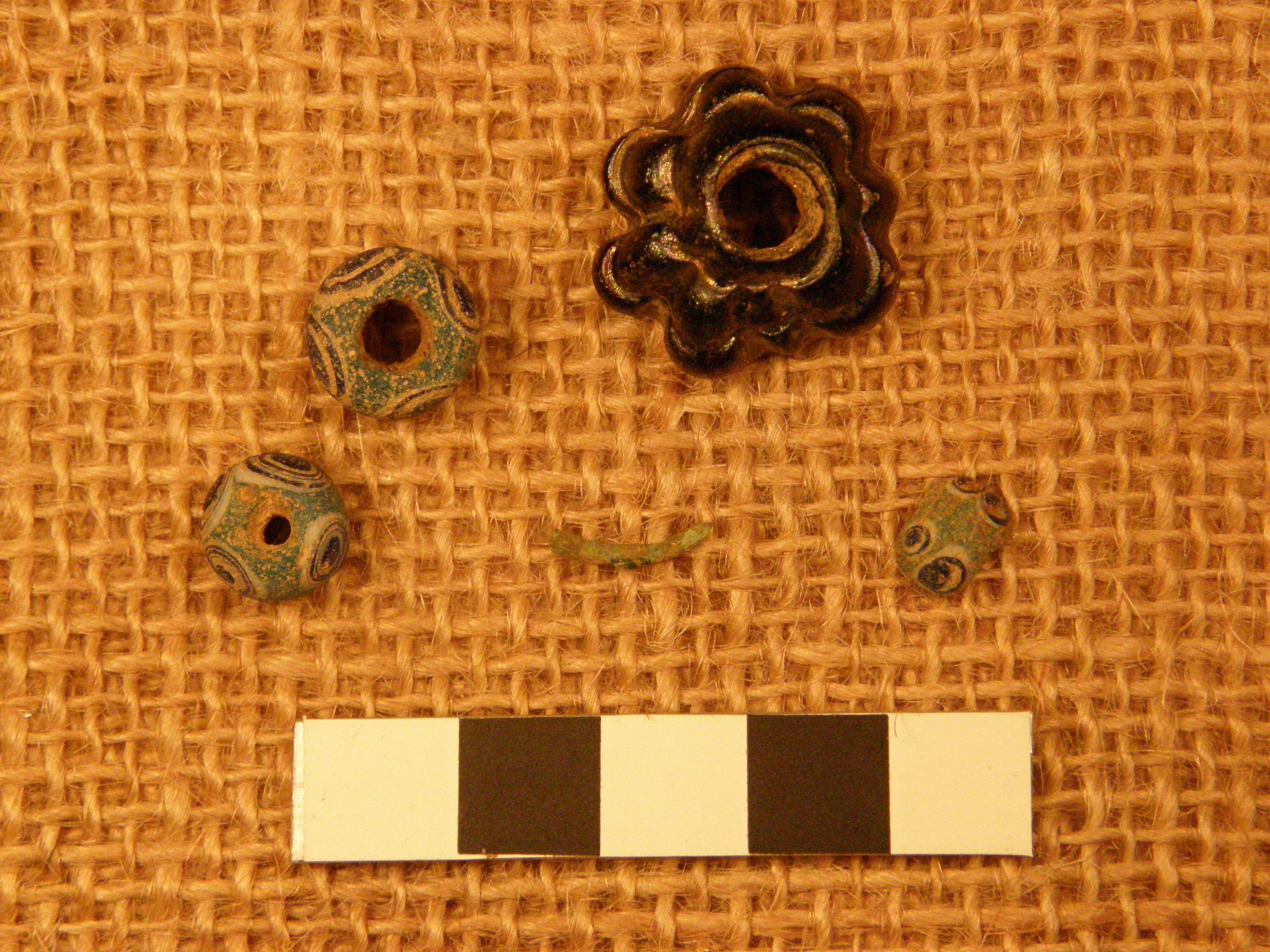
Glass paste beads from tomb 1, Necropolis 6. Three present Punic tradition, while the flower-shaped one is known as Lotus mellon bread, from the 6th century AD (Very common in Late Antiquity necropolei)

Future excavations will determine if there was some sort of connection between the ecclesiastical complex and this necropolis, since both share the same chronology.

== Evidence of occupation in the port from the Middle Ages to the present ==
According to the material collected, it is possible that the city was abandoned at some point around the 6th century, even though a small population could have continued to live or use the area.

What happened in the area during the centuries of transition between Antiquity and Middle Ages, around the 5th to the 10th centuries, has not been clarified yet. In this way, this period presents a problem for the study of the city of Sanisera, since no convincing information has been found due to lack of written and archaeological sources. It is possible that during some of these centuries, the two basilicas would have had an important role for the organization of the population living in Sanitja and its surroundings, and could have been used by foreign peoples that could have arrived to the port of Sanitja as colonizers and settlers after the Fall of Rome.

=== Muslim occupation ===
There is evidence in Sanitja of a much later occupation represented by a population living in the port during the Muslim period, due to the presence of a small mosque built by reusing Roman constructive material, which could be related to a possible Muslim farmstead which has not been located yet. Due to this occupation, the port could have continued to be witness of the navigation and maritime commerce taking place in the easternmost territories of Al-Andalus.

In 903 ‘Isâm al-Khawlânî conquered Mallorca and Menorca, due to their strategic position in the Mediterranean. The Islamic occupation lasted until 1286, when Christians conquered Menorca under King.

In Menorca and Mallorca, the placename Sa Mesquida indicates the places where mosques used to be located. The mosque located in Sanitja is the first one found in the Balearic Islands. It consists of a rectangular room with a semicircular projection (mihrab) at the center of its southern wall. Even though the entrance has not been recorded, it could have been opposite the mihrab, at the center of the northern wall.

=== Modern Period ===
==== S’Almadrava (18th and 19th centuries) ====
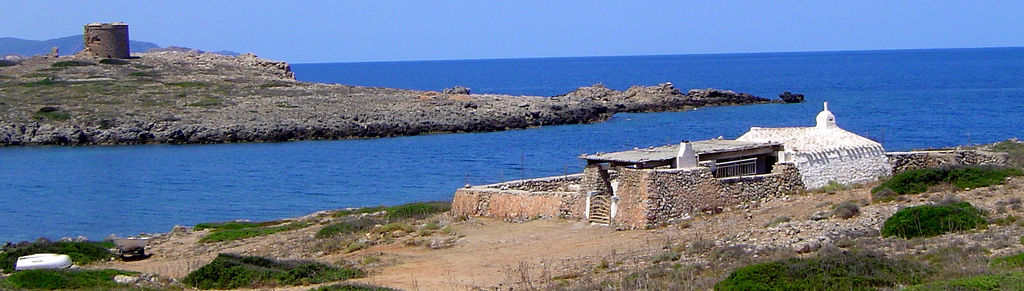
S'Almadrava, located to the east of the Port of Sanitja, opposite the English tower

To the east of the Port of Sanitja there is a small traditional white house which was built at the end of the 18th century. It was the first fishing industry set in Menorca and was called S’Almadrava.

In 1787 a group of Menorcan fishermen set this firm in order to fish tuna. Because the company was unsuccessful, it was dissolved one year later. Some decades later, in 1859, they decided to try again with the help of fishermen from the east coast of the Iberian Peninsula. However, the project was abandoned after several attempts. From that moment onwards S'Almadrava was used as a refuge by fishermen from the town of Fornells.

==== British tower in the Port of Sanitja ====
The strategic location of the island was the main reason for the British army to occupy it during the 18th and early 19th centuries. War between Napoleon and England made necessary the presence of watchtowers in different territories between 1798 and 1801. The British ruled Menorca for 70 years in three main phases: 1708-1756; 1763–1781 and 1798-1802. In between phases, the French (1756–1763) and the Spanish (1782–1798) governed the island as well.

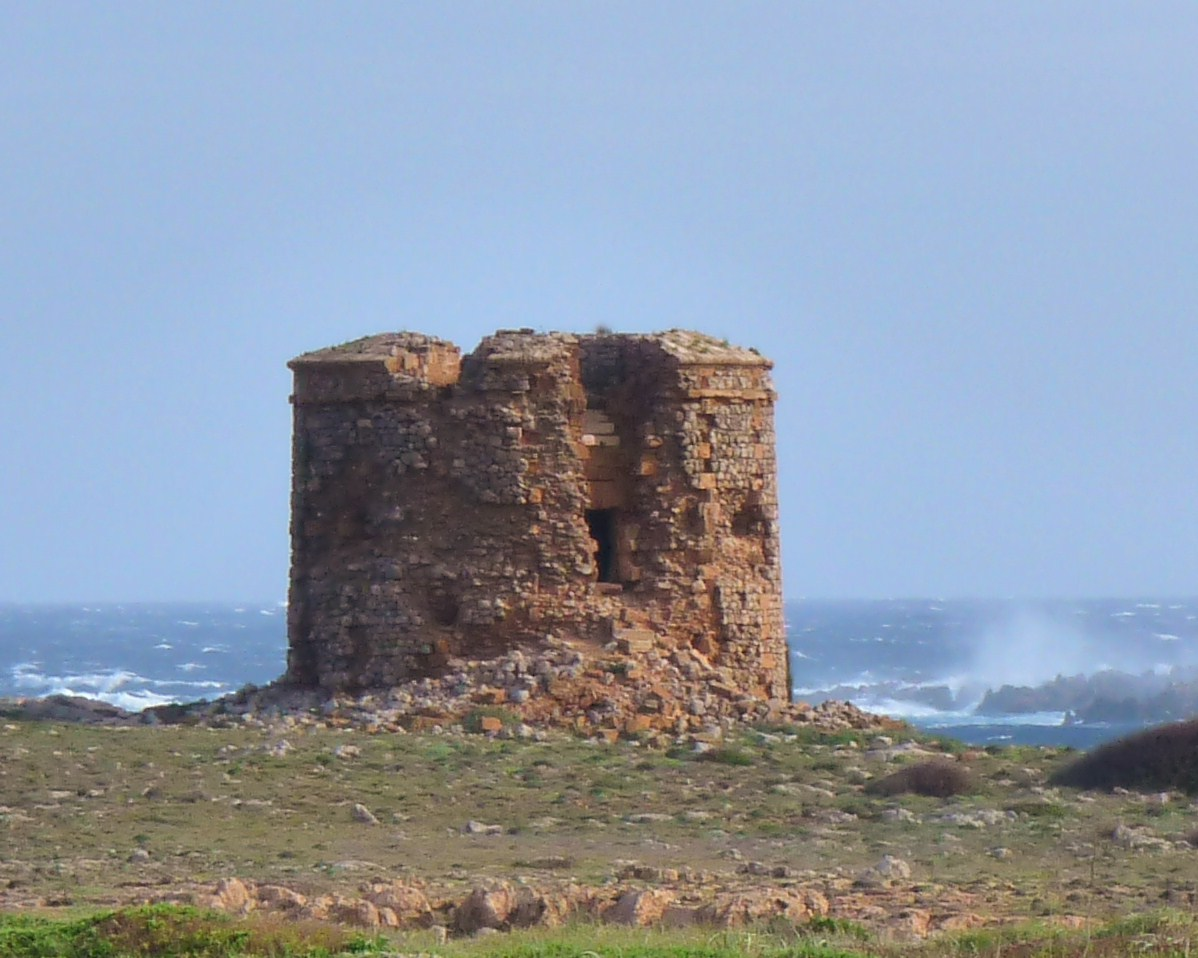
British tower located at the west side of the Port of Sanitja

From the British period in Menorca there are several military buildings, some churches and colonial houses. Another legacy of this British past can be found in the language, since it presents loads of anglicisms.

At the entrance to the port there is an English watchtower, which was built in 1800. It was erected during the last phase of British occupation (1798–1802), forming part of a system of eleven towers whose function was that of averting enemy armies from disembarking in the port. For this reason, this type of towers presented small detachments and swivel guns on their top floor.

The Sanitja watchtower – identical to the tower in the port of Addaia- is circular in plan and its diameter is 100 m2. It presents four levels or floors: A subterranean ground which was used as a cistern to collect rain water; the ground floor that was divided up in three rooms to store supplies and weapons. The third level served as bedroom for the garrison. The fourth or top floor presented a swivel gun at its center. From there a vast territory could be controlled, including two other towers located in Fornells and Mount Toro. At a distance of 30 meters to the east of the tower there was a set of batteries (small cannons) protected by a short dry wall (80 centimeters tall) which was parallel to the coast line.

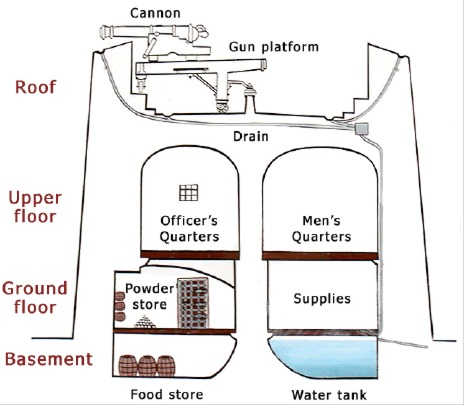
Diagram of a Martello tower

This type of military structures can be found in Ireland, where they are known as Martello towers. They were also built during the early 19th century, such as the tower in Shenick Island.

Another important element which is related to the British watchtower is located right in the coastline of the Port of Sanitja. It consists of two semicircular structures formed by irregular limestone blocks. Next to one of them there is a wall which follows an east–west orientation, entering into the sea. This could be a dock used by the British soldiers, whereas the two semicircular structures could be small bulwarks that controlled the arrival of boats to the port.

==== Cavalleria lighthouse and shipwrecks ====
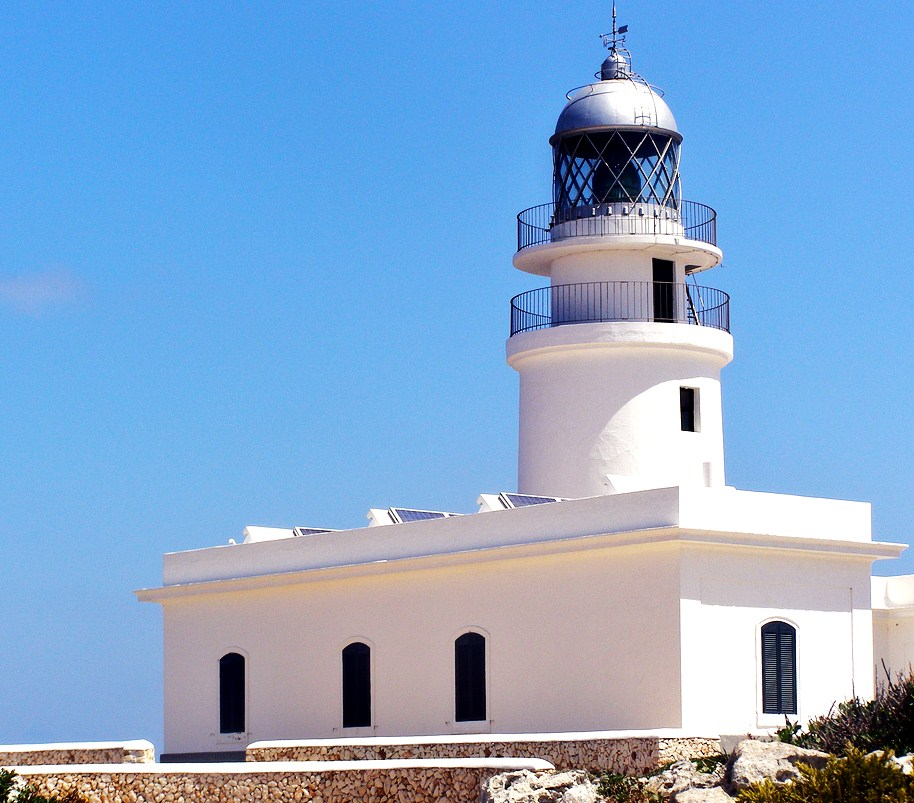
Cavalleria Cape lighthouse

In 1857 a lighthouse was built on the northernmost point of Cavalleria Cape under the petition of the authorities of the island, due to the frequency of wrecks taking place on the northern coast. The lighthouse tower is 15 metres high and it is located 94 metres above the sea level. It shows two white lights every ten seconds and reaches a maximum of 26 nautical miles.

In fact, more than 700 wrecks between the 14th and the 19th centuries are documented in different charts. According to these written records, many of them wrecked during the 18th and 19th centuries, such as San Josef (1712), La Asunción (1821), San Jaume (1892) and Bourgianen (1900). Two of them, La Asunción and Bourgianen were located in the past few years.

===== The Bourgianen =====
In 2006 a comprehensive underwater survey was undertaken to identify any potential remains from the wreck of the Bourgianen, a late 19th-century schooner wrecked at the mouth of the inlet in June 1900. The survey identified the presence of a section of timber wreckage and also identified a number features associated with this wreckage, including iron concretions and a possible swivel-gun.

This schooner, which was of Italian origin and built in August 1899, was commanded by captain Narciso Antonio Barsello. The vessel was on-route from the port of Catania to Barcelona with a cargo of broad-beans and other perishable goods. The vessel's rudder was damaged and broke apart.

===== La Asunción =====
A large number of masonry blocks and rectangular anthracite blocks were encountered scattered across the seabed. These blocks are thought to represent the debris-field from the wreck of the Sardinian xebec La Asunción, a vessel commanded by captain Antonio d’Así which was reported to have been wrecked in 1821.

Shipwreck found in 2009

===== 2009 discovery =====
A survey carried out in November 2009 made the discovery of a previously unknown section of timber wreckage. The exposed section of timber from the wreck comprises fourteen framing timbers, four ceiling timbers, and two partially visible outer planking timbers.

== Bibliography ==
- Strabo, Geography. Volume III. Books V-VII
- Pliny the Elder, Historia Naturalis. Book III
- Francesc Camps i Mercadal, Llegendes de Menorca, en Folklore Menorquí de la Pagesia, Tom V Col.lecció Capcer, 1986
- Miquel Àngel Casanovas Camps, Història de Menorca (2005)
- P. Palol, Arqueología Cristiana de la España Romana. Siglos IV-VI(Madrid, 1967)
- López Vilar, J., Tàrraco Paleocristiana: El Suburbi de Francolí, Universitat Rovira i Virgili, Tarragona, 2004.
