= Time Team series 13 =

Time Team
- Season 13
- No. of episodes: 13

Release
- Original network: Channel 4
- Original release: 22 January – 16 April 2006

Series chronology
- ← Previous; Series 12 Next → Series 14

This is a list of Time Team episodes from series 13.

== Episode ==
=== Series 13 ===
Episode # refers to the air date order. The Time Team Specials are aired in between regular episodes, but are omitted from this list. Regular contributors on Time Team include: Tony Robinson (presenter); archaeologists Mick Aston, Phil Harding, Helen Geake, Francis Pryor, Neil Holbrook, Brigid Gallagher, Raksha Dave, Matt Williams; Guy de la Bedoyere (Roman historian); Jackie McKinley (bones expert); Victor Ambrus (illustrator); Stewart Ainsworth (landscape investigator); John Gater (geophysicist); Henry Chapman (surveyor); Paul Blinkhorn (pottery expert); Mark Corney (Roman specialist); Faye Simpson (finds expert); Raysan Al-Kubaisi (computer graphics).

No. overall	No. in season	Title	Location	Coordinates	Original release date
143	1	"The Bodies in the Shed - Glendon's Lost Graveyard"	Glendon, Northamptonshire	52.423777°N 0.757779°W	22 January 2006
The Team is visiting Glendon Hall to unravel the mystery of the human skeletons found under an outbuilding. The team are joined by Richard Morriss (historic building consultant) and Glenn Foard (landscape archaeologist).
144	2	"Villas out of Molehills"	Withington, Gloucestershire	51.832918°N 1.952569°W	29 January 2006
When a colony of moles brings up pieces of mosaic floor in a Cotswold field, Tony Robinson and the team investigate whether the findings could be linked to a nearby Roman villa discovered almost 200 years ago. A local spring might give a clue to the true purpose of the building. The team are joined by local archaeologist Roger Box, and Roman specialists David Neal and Richard Reece.
145	3	"Rubble at the Mill"	Manchester, Greater Manchester	53.487311°N 2.236522°W	5 February 2006
The team set to work uncovering Manchester's first cotton mill, built by one of the fathers of the Industrial Revolution, Richard Arkwright. Over three days the team uncover the remains of a complex factory and also signs of a revolutionary steam engine that was decades ahead of its time. The team are joined by Mike Nevell from Manchester University, and Jennifer Tann (technology historian).
146	4	"The First Tudor Palace?"	Esher, Surrey	51.373740°N 0.376815°W	12 February 2006
The team visit Wayneflete Tower which is all that remains of a palace. Over three days they piece together the story of a site that evolved into one of the most stunning buildings of early Tudor times. They are joined by historic buildings expert Jonathan Foyle, John Guy (historian) and dendrochronologist Mick Worthington.
147	5	"The Boat on the Rhine - A Roman Boat in Utrecht"	Utrecht, Netherlands	52.080317°N 5.023004°E	19 February 2006
The team is invited by Dutch archaeologists to help rescue crucial evidence from a 35-metre-long barge that once sailed the Rhine. The team has one chance to investigate the boat before the bulldozers move in.They are joined by city archaeologists Erik Graafstal and Herre Wynia, Fleur Kemmers (coin specialist) and Jaap Morel (ship archaeologist). Together with wood specialists Damian Goodburn and Esther Jansma, Phil looks at a similar barge which has been preserved and exhibited.
148	6	"Court of the Kentish King"	Eastry, Kent	51.256012°N 1.312794°E	26 February 2006
The team descends on the orchards of Kent to search for the lost Anglo-Saxon palace of Eastry, and discover two likely contenders. Over three days, they dig the longest trench in Time Team history.
149	7	"The Monks' Manor"	Brimham, Harrogate, North Yorkshire	54.062747°N 1.662743°W	5 March 2006
The team travels to the Yorkshire Dales to meet Chris and Barbara Bradley on their farm to uncover the remains of a monastic grange - a medieval forerunner to the grand country house, with connections to nearby Fountains Abbey. Kerry Ely is the site supervisor, and the team are joined by Jonathan Clarke (buildings archaeologist) and Mark Newman from the National Trust. Matt is "volunteered" to lead the tough life of a medieval lay brother for 24 hours.
150	8	"Castle in the Round"	Queenborough, Kent	51.416134°N 0.748727°E	12 March 2006
The team investigate the remains of Queenborough Castle on the Isle of Sheppey, built by Edward III for Queen Philippa during the Hundred Years' War. The Time Team excavate the castle mound, and opinion is divided whether this unique circular structure was built for defence or as a royal bolthole from the plague. They are joined by archaeologist Oliver Creighton, medieval historian Sam Newton and architectural historian Jonathan Foyle.
151	9	"Sussex Ups and Downs"	Blackpatch, West Sussex	50.874978°N 0.443323°W	19 March 2006
The team travels to what could be a Neolithic settlement in the Sussex Downs. Initially discovered by John Pull in 1923, the site is littered with remains of 6000-year-old flint mines. But Pull claimed to have discovered a second site nearby, which has so far eluded other diggers. The team are joined by archaeologist Miles Russell, pottery expert Sue Hamilton and wood specialist Maisie Taylor. Neolithic lifestyle specialist Jacqui Wood makes some elderflower tea and threatens to make a new hat for Phil. Phil and Francis demonstrate the relative merits of Mesolithic and Neolithic axes.
152	10	"Birthplace of the Confessor"	Islip, Oxfordshire	51.825050°N 1.232742°W	26 March 2006
The team descends upon the sleepy Oxfordshire village of Islip, the birthplace of Edward the Confessor, for one of the most challenging and intriguing excavations of the series. They are joined by architectural historians Sam Newton and Jonathan Foyle. Helen and Sam visit Westminster Abbey to view original documents relating Edward to Islip.
153	11	"Early Bath"	Ffrith, Flintshire	53.090283°N 3.069603°W	2 April 2006
The team descend on the village of Ffrith in North Wales to discover if it is built on the remains of a Roman mining town. The main street runs along the route of Offa's Dyke. The dig involves excavating two gardens and the playing field, but the team are frustrated in their attempts to find a Roman bath house. The team are joined by archaeologist Chris Martin and historian David Mason.
154	12	"The Taxman's Tavern - A Roman Mansio"	Alfoldean, Horsham, West Sussex	51.0852°N 0.4046°W	9 April 2006
Time Team travel to Alfoldean in West Sussex to uncover a Roman mansio or stopping-place, and hence the story of the whole settlement. The dig takes place in ploughed fields on both sides of the A29, or what the Romans knew as Stane Street. But atrocious weather and the sheer scale of the site push the team's resources to the limits. They are joined by Roman Sussex specialist Miles Russell and archaeologist Mike Luke. Phil gets a new hat. They are visited by pupils from the nearby Christ's Hospital School. Farrier Cliff Barnes uses the school forge to make hipposandals - precursors of the modern horseshoe.
155	13	"Scotch Broch"	Applecross, Scottish Highlands	57.43176°N 5.81387°W	16 April 2006
Tony and the team journey to Applecross in the north west of Scotland to excavate a broch, a monumental dry-stone tower that was one of the largest Iron Age structures in Britain. But they are hampered by stony soil and a massive overhead power line. They are joined by Scottish Iron Age specialists Ian Armit, Andy Heald, Cathy Dagg, Noel Fojut.

== See also ==
- Time Team Live
- Time Team History Hunters
- Time Team Digs
- Time Team Extra
- Time Team America
- Time Team Specials
- Time Team Others
