= Time Team Digs =

- Presented by: Tony Robinson
- Country of origin: United Kingdom
- No. of series: 1
- No. of episodes: 8

Production
- Executive producer: Philip Clarke
- Producers: Tim Taylor; Jeremy Cross; Laurence Vulliamy
- Running time: 60 minutes (including adverts)

Original release
- Network: Channel 4
- Release: 1 November – 27 December 2002

Related
- Time Signs; Time Team; History Hunters; Time Team Live; Time Team Extra; Time Team America

Time Team Digs is a British television series that aired on Channel 4 in 2002. Presented by the actor Tony Robinson, the show is a spin-off of the archaeology series Time Team, that first aired on Channel 4 in 1994. It is also known as Time Team Digs: A History of Britain.

Time Team Digs is an eight-part series including highlights from previous Time Team digs, with each episode focusing on a particular period in history, going from the Bronze Age to the modern day.

== Production and cast ==
The series producer of Time Team Digs was Tim Taylor, the creator and producer of Time Team and its predecessor Time Signs. The executive producer was Philip Clarke and the producers were Jeremy Cross and Laurence Vulliamy. Tony Robinson, the presenter, was also the associate producer. Regular contributors on Time Team included: archaeologists Mick Aston, Phil Harding, Carenza Lewis, Neil Holbrook; Robin Bush (historian); Victor Ambrus (illustrator); Stewart Ainsworth (landscape investigator); John Gater and Chris Gaffney (geophysicists); Henry Chapman (surveyor).

== Episodes ==
Time Team Digs aired for eight sixty-minute episodes, from 1 November to 27 December 2002. Each episode aired on a Friday.

No.	Title	Original release date
1	"The Bronze Age"	1 November 2002
Tony Robinson presents a rich picture of Bronze Age Britain from Time Team's 20-year archive, starting with the oldest man-made item ever found on the programme, a flint axe found in the topsoil in a Worcestershire field (dig no.40). And Mick explains how cropmarks in fields can be used to identify structures from different periods. As shown in the Waddon dig (dig no.49), Bronze Age monuments can be found rubbing shoulders with Iron Age remains - in this case, a henge. These mysterious and charismatic structures are often made of timber, and thus rot away. But in 1999 the team had the opportunity to watch the excavation of a complete henge preserved on a Norfolk coast - not without some opposition (dig no.45). One of Time Team's specialities is reconstruction, and they decided to replicate the original seahenge using ancient technology. In dig 24, dig 54 and dig 77 they did a similar exercise with wooden walkways. Tony is joined by Richard Bradley from Reading University, who explains why it's called the Bronze Age, illustrated with some beautiful objects from the period.
2	"The Iron Age"	8 November 2002
Tony takes a fresh look at Time Team digs from the pre-Roman period in Britain, notorious for its primitive, bloodthirsty tribes constantly warring with one another. Is there a different side to these ancient peoples? He begins with two bungalows in rural Dorset where pottery has been turning up (dig 49). They discover several roundhouses, and use computer graphics to bring them to life. At an airbase in Worcestershire (dig 85) they get a picture of domestic life, including personal grooming. The vast Salisbury Plain conceals rich Iron Age archeology (dig 67). Here they are excited by signs of a rare banjo enclosure; and army volunteers help build a replica roundhouse complete with wattle and daub. But they also investigate the darker side of Iron Age life, with two subterranean structures, one a narrow man-made chamber in Orkney (dig 60), and the other a bone cave in Gloucestershire (dig 68). This yields some very macabre finds. Finally, they look at the development of industry and foreign trade in Cornwall (dig 83), showing a people who were becoming increasingly sophisticated and confident. Their world was changed forever by the arrival of the Romans in AD 43. Tony is joined by John Collis of Sheffield University, who discusses ritual activity from the period.
3	"The Roman Invasion"	15 November 2002
4	"Roman Britain"	22 November 2002
5	"The Dark Ages"	29 November 2002
Britain, after the exit of the Romans in the 5th century, was invaded by all sorts of people - Jutes, Angles, Saxons, Vikings, Norsemen - and this makes it a fascinating and puzzling period. Tony presents highlights of Time Team digs illuminating the Dark Ages. In Shetland they discover rows of nails indicating what could well be a Viking boat burial; and in the process unearth one of the most beautiful objects in the series - a bronze brooch (dig 96). It's matched only by several brass buckets, buried in Hampshire (dig 89). This is the time when Christianity was established in Britain, as illustrated by new light shed on a bizarre death in Norfolk (dig 41). Joanna Storey of Leicester University explains some Saxon burial practices, and the prominent role of women such as St Hilda, shown in dig 57. Both Viking York (Time Team Live, dig 16) and Saxon Ely (Time Team (Specials) dig 75) show the cultural influence of the invading peoples. Political unity would eventually be provided by the Norman Conquest in 1066.
6	"Medieval England"	6 December 2002
The 11th to 16th centuries in England were a time of both prosperity and upheaval.Time Team relives some of its most memorable excavations, concentrating on medieval industry - for instance tile-making in Canterbury (dig 73), or shipbuilding in Small Hythe (dig 36). Much Wenlock in Shropshire is an early example of a market town, with shops and businesses close to domestic buildings, and the market as a focal point (dig 3). In Plympton, Devon (dig 35) we see an example of a deliberately planned town, with much evidence of early buildings. In the 14th century the Black Death wiped out whole communities, including High Worsall in North Yorkshire (dig 30). It took two centuries for the population to recover. But of course, in spite of local tragedies, many buildings survived the plague, including the manor at Aston Eyre (dig 28). Man-made acts of sabotage were responsible for the destruction of large structures such as St. Leonards Hospital in York (dig 58), and the original Coventry Cathedral (dig 52). The latter was so important, they revisited it for a Time Team special (dig 70), uncovering a magnificent 15th century piece of painted stonework. Finally, Henry VIII's dissolution of the monasteries effectively consigned the Middle Ages to the history books. With additional contributions by Dawn Hadley of Sheffield University.
7	"The Modern Era"	13 December 2002
8	"The Norman Conquest"	27 December 2002
The most famous date in British history is 1066. But did everything change overnight from being English to being French? Tony looks at the many Time Team digs which help to answer that question, from the Norman Conquest to the Bubonic Plague. Of course they look at some castles, beginning with an intriguing site which is little more than a wooded mound (dig 62). In Bridgnorth (dig 72) the team investigate why the tower is leaning at an angle, and Phil Harding gets to fire a cannon. A local beauty spot in Warwickshire conceals a huge castle complex (dig 87). But they also look at sacred buildings - a particular speciality of Mick Aston. The pupils of Thetford Grammar want to know about a cathedral beneath their school (dig 33). Team member Jenni spends 24 hours as a nun at the site of an experimental unisex monastery (dig 80). Near Winchester they battle the elements to investigate a medieval leper hospital (dig 74). Osteoarchaeologist Margaret Cox describes the symptoms of leprosy using a real skull; and Victor Ambrus creates a clay model of an unfortunate victim. At Templecombe in Somerset they focus on the charismatic Knights Templar (dig 12). Tony is joined by Robert Liddiard of UEA.

== DVD releases ==
Time Team Digs was released on DVD in the UK (Region 2) on 7 March 2005. The 3-disc DVD set also contains a 30-minute documentary Behind the Scenes with Time Team and the 1997 and 1999 Time Team Christmas specials.

== See also ==
- List of Time Team episodes
- Time Team Specials
- Time Team Others
