= Time Team Live =

- Also known as: Time Team Big Dig, Time Team's Big Roman Dig, Time Team: Big Royal Dig
- Presented by: Tony Robinson, Sandi Toksvig, various.
- Country of origin: United Kingdom
- No. of series: 8

Production
- Producer: Tim Taylor

Original release
- Network: Channel 4
- Release: 23 August 1997 – 28 August 2006

Related
- Time Signs; Time Team; History Hunters; Time Team Digs; Time Team Extra; Time Team America

Time Team Live was a British television series that aired on Channel 4. The first programme was shown in 1997 and the most recent was in 2006. Presented by the actor Tony Robinson and guest presenters, this is a live version of the archaeology series Time Team, showing more of what happens in real time, than when the cut-down episode airs on Channel 4.

== Background ==
Time Team Live episodes came from historically important sites. Instead of showing a 'best of' show, the live episodes were broadcast whilst the digs were actually taking place. Later, regular episodes were made from the best of the live episodes. Normally, regular sites were recorded in the same method, however, only a few were selected for live broadcast. The regular episodes were either a special, or a normal series episode.

== Episodes ==
=== Series 1 (1997) ===
Guest presented by Sandi Toksvig and Hugh Fearnley-Whittingstall alongside Robinson. Edited into Time Team series 5, episode 4.

No.	Title	Location	Directed by	Coordinates	Original release date
1–9	"Time Team Live 1997"	Turkdean, Gloucestershire	Simon Raikes	51.869531°N 1.856436°W	23-25 August 1997
Over the course of the August Bank Holiday weekend, the team went to Turkdean in Gloucestershire to try to discover whether experts are correct in believing the site used to house Roman buildings.

=== Series 2 (1998) ===
Guest presented by Sandi Toksvig and Hugh Fearnley-Whittingstall alongside Robinson. Edited into Time Team series 6, episode 11.

No.	Title	Location	Directed by	Coordinates	Original release date
10	"Episode One"	Bawsey, Norfolk	Brendan Hughes	52.7497°N 0.48766°E	29 August 1998
Iron Age settlement and Norman church
11	"Episode Two"	TBA	Unknown	TBA	29 August 1998
12	"Episode Three"	TBA	Unknown	TBA	30 August 1998
13	"Episode Four"	TBA	Unknown	TBA	30 August 1998
14	"Episode Five"	TBA	Unknown	TBA	30 August 1998
15	"Episode Six"	TBA	Unknown	TBA	31 August 1998
16	"Episode Seven"	TBA	Unknown	TBA	31 August 1998

=== Series 3 (1999) ===
Guest presented by Sandi Toksvig and Paul Thompson alongside Robinson. Edited into Time Team series 7, episode 13, "York".

No.	Title	Location	Directed by	Coordinates	Original release date
17	"Episode One"	York, Yorkshire	Laurence Vulliamy	TBA	3 September 1999
Roman cemetery, Viking buildings and the medieval St Leonard's hospital
18	"Episode Two"	TBA	Unknown	TBA	3 September 1999
19	"Episode Three"	TBA	Unknown	TBA	4 September 1999
20	"Episode Four"	TBA	Unknown	TBA	4 September 1999
21	"Episode Five"	TBA	Unknown	TBA	5 September 1999
22	"Episode Six"	TBA	Unknown	TBA	5 September 1999

=== Series 4 (2000) ===
Guest presented by Sandi Toksvig and Liza Tarbuck alongside Robinson. Edited into Time Team series 8, episode 12, "Three Tales of Canterbury".

No.	Title	Location	Directed by	Coordinates	Original release date
23	"Episode One"	Canterbury, Kent	Laurence Vulliamy, Amanda Fidler, Duncan Hess	TBA	25 August 2000
Roman temple, medieval kiln and Franciscan friary
24	"Episode Two"	TBA	Unknown	TBA	25 August 2000
25	"Episode Three"	TBA	Unknown	TBA	26 August 2000
26	"Episode Four"	TBA	Unknown	TBA	26 August 2000
27	"Episode Five"	TBA	Unknown	TBA	27 August 2000
28	"Episode Six"	TBA	Unknown	TBA	27 August 2000

=== Series 5 (2001) ===
Guest presented by Sandi Toksvig alongside Robinson. Alice Roberts appears in an archaeology role, her first appearance on TV, but appears as an "expert", not a presenter. Edited into Time Team series 9, episode 13, "Seven Buckets and a Buckle".

No.	Title	Location	Directed by	Coordinates	Original release date
29	"Episode One"	Breamore, Hampshire	Mel Morpeth, Michael Douglas, Patrick McGrady, Laurence Vulliamy	50.954994°N 1.772017°W	28 August 2001
30	"Episode Two"	TBA	Unknown	TBA	29 August 2001
31	"Episode Three"	TBA	Unknown	TBA	30 August 2001
32	"Episode Four"	TBA	Unknown	TBA	31 August 2001

=== The Big Dig (2003) ===
Time Team's Big Dig was an expansion on the live format. A weekend of live broadcasts in June 2003 was preceded by a week of daily short programmes. It involved about a thousand members of the public in excavating test pits each one metre square by fifty centimetres deep. Most of these pits were in private gardens and the project stirred up controversies about approaches to public archaeology. Edited into a Time Team special, "Big Dig, The Hole Story".

No.	Title	Location	Directed by	Coordinates	Original release date
33	"Episode One"	Great Easton, Leicestershire	Unknown	TBA	22 June 2003
34	"Episode Two"	Wolverhampton; Barnet, Greater London; Oakamoor, Staffordshire	Unknown	TBA	23 June 2003
35	"Episode Three"	TBA	Unknown	TBA	24 June 2003
36	"Episode Four"	TBA	Unknown	TBA	25 June 2003
37	"Episode Five"	TBA	Unknown	TBA	26 June 2003
38	"Episode Six"	TBA	Unknown	TBA	27 June 2003
39	"Episode Seven"	TBA	Unknown	TBA	28 June 2003
40	"Episode Eight"	TBA	Unknown	TBA	29 June 2003

=== Big Roman Dig (2005) ===
Time Team's Big Roman Dig (2005) saw the "Big dig" format altered, in an attempt to avoid previous controversies, through the coverage of nine archaeological sites around the UK which were already under investigation by professional archaeologists. Time Team covered the action through live link-ups based at a Roman Villa at Dinnington in Somerset – itself a Time Team excavation from 2003. Over 60 other professionally supervised excavations were supported by Time Team and carried out around the country in association with the programme. A further hundred activities relating to Roman history were carried out by schools and other institutions around the UK.

Material from the Big Roman Dig relating to the Roman villa site at Dinnington, Somerset; along with material from the earlier episode at the same site - Time Team series 10, episode 2 "Mosaics, Mosaics, Mosaics" - was used in a Time Team Special, "The Big Roman Villa".

No.	Title	Location	Directed by	Coordinates	Original release date
41	"Episode One"	TBA	Unknown	50.918152°N 2.849492°W	2 July 2005
A series of live programmes with a Roman theme, featuring 10 sites.
42	"Episode Two"	TBA	Unknown	TBA	2 July 2005
43	"Episode Three"	TBA	Unknown	TBA	3 July 2005
44	"Episode Four"	TBA	Unknown	TBA	4 July 2005
45	"Episode Five"	TBA	Unknown	TBA	5 July 2005
46	"Episode Six"	TBA	Unknown	TBA	6 July 2005
47	"Episode Seven"	TBA	Unknown	TBA	7 July 2005
48	"Episode Eight"	TBA	Unknown	TBA	9 July 2005
49	"Episode Nine"	TBA	Unknown	TBA	9 July 2005

==== 2005 Extras ====
No.	Title	Location	Directed by	Coordinates	Original release date
50	"Episode One"	TBA	TBA	TBA	TBA
A series of live programmes with a Roman theme, featuring 10 sites.
51	"Episode Two"	TBA	TBA	TBA	TBA
52	"Episode Three"	TBA	TBA	TBA	TBA
53	"Episode Four"	TBA	TBA	TBA	TBA
54	"Episode Five"	TBA	TBA	TBA	TBA
55	"Episode Six"	TBA	TBA	TBA	TBA
56	"Episode Seven"	TBA	TBA	TBA	TBA
57	"Episode Eight"	TBA	TBA	TBA	TBA
58	"Episode Nine"	TBA	TBA	TBA	TBA

=== Big Royal Dig (2006) ===
Edited into a Time Team special, "Big Royal Dig".

No.	Title	Location	Directed by	Coordinates	Original release date
59	"Episode One"	TBA	Unknown	TBA	25 August 2006
Over the August bank holiday, they conducted excavations in three Royal gardens for the Queen. The event, timed to celebrate the Queen's 80th birthday, was Time Team's 150th dig. (For full descriptions of the findings, see Buckingham Palace and Buckingham Palace Garden, Windsor Castle and Palace of Holyroodhouse.) In addition to the nightly programmes on Channel 4, six hours of live coverage per day was shown on More4.
60	"Episode Two"	TBA	Unknown	TBA	19:25, 26 August 2006
61	"Episode Three"	TBA	Unknown	TBA	20:00, 27 August 2006
62	"Episode Four"	TBA	Unknown	TBA	21:00, 28 August 2006

==== More4 Extras ====
No.	Title	Location	Directed by	Coordinates	Original release date
TBA	"Day One"	TBA	Unknown	TBA	26 August 2006
Six hours of live broadcast.
TBA	"Day Two"	TBA	Unknown	TBA	27 August 2006
Six hours of live broadcast.
TBA	"Day Three"	TBA	Unknown	TBA	28 August 2006
Six hours of live broadcast.

== See also ==
- List of Time Team episodes
- Time Team Specials
- Time Team Others
