= Time Team series 8 =

Season of television series

Time Team
- Season 8
- No. of episodes: 13

Release
- Original network: Channel 4
- Original release: 7 January – 1 April 2001

Series chronology
- ← Previous; Series 7 Next → Series 9

This is a list of Time Team episodes from series 8.

== Episode ==
=== Series 8 ===
Episode # refers to the air date order. The Time Team Specials are aired in between regular episodes, but are omitted from this list. Regular contributors on Time Team include: Tony Robinson (presenter); archaeologists Mick Aston, Phil Harding, Carenza Lewis, Neil Holbrook, Jenni Butterworth, Mick Worthington, Katie Hirst, Francis Pryor; Robin Bush, Guy de la Bedoyere (historians); Margaret Cox (osteoarchaeologist); Victor Ambrus (illustrator); Stewart Ainsworth (landscape investigator); John Gater (geophysicist); Henry Chapman (surveyor); Paul Blinkhorn (pottery expert); Mark Corney (Roman buildings expert); Raysan Al-Kubaisi (computer graphics).

No. overall	No. in season	Title	Location	Historical period	Coordinates	Original release date
61	1	"An Anglo-Saxon Cemetery in Lincolnshire"	Normanton, Lincolnshire	Anglo-Saxon, Roman	53.003676°N 0.601684°W	7 January 2001
The team are intrigued that an Anglo-Saxon cemetery should contain Roman pottery. They are joined by archaeologist Naomi Field, Maggie Darling (Roman pottery expert), Martin Welch (Anglo-Saxon expert), Irit Narkis (archaeological conservator), and Kevin Leahy (Anglo-Saxon cemeteries expert).
62	2	"The Man Who Bought a Castle"	Alderton, Northamptonshire	Norman, Anglo-Saxon	52.116304°N 0.919547°W	14 January 2001
Derek Batten bought a plot of land advertised as a castle and moat; but there is little sign of a castle other than a tree-covered mound surrounded by a huge ditch. So he has asked Time Team to sort it out. Because the site is a scheduled ancient monument, the team have to get permission from English Heritage for strictly limited excavations. To complicate matters further, Tony has to adjudicate on a long-running boundary dispute. The team is joined by castles expert Philip Dixon. Phil Harding gets kitted-out in chainmail as a Saxon footsoldier, facing a mounted Norman warrior on a Spanish stallion. The site is finally identified as a ringwork castle, built on a previous Saxon structure around the time of the Norman Conquest.
63	3	"The Celtic Spring"	Llygadwy, Powys	Iron Age, Neolithic, Modern	51.884672°N 3.234257°W	21 January 2001
In deepest Wales lies an extraordinary site, with a Megalith, a Neolithic tomb, a Norman watchtower, early Christian symbols, and a natural spring. From this spring, the landowner has recovered an astonishing variety of coins, sculptures and jewelry. It is almost too good to be true, rather like an ancient theme park. So begins one of Time Team's most remarkable digs. Geophysics shows no structure anywhere on the site. The megalith is far too shallow to have stayed upright for thousands of years. And when the team unearth a sword, they start to get suspicious. They are joined by Celtic ritual expert Miranda Green, architectural historian Will Hughes, and Iron Age specialist Ian Stead. Results show that the site has been 'salted' and the finds have all been placed or build between the 19th century and as late as the 1980s. More info can be found at Llygadwy.
64	4	"A Waltham Villa"	Waltham Field, Whittington, Gloucestershire	Roman, Iron Age	51.886678°N 1.991152°W	28 January 2001
Time Team want to paint a picture of a family living in a Roman villa in the Cotswolds almost 2000 years ago. So they decide to dig a site near Fosse Way, only a few hundred metres from two previously excavated villas, in an area unusually dense with Roman remains. They are joined by Neil Holbrook, Roman specialist Richard Reece, and Finds specialist Alex Croom. Phil helps Peter Reynolds reconstruct a tribulum, a Roman threshing board. And the experts conclude that the villa was built very early after the Roman invasion, but abandoned – possibly for financial reasons – quite soon after.
65	5	"The 'Lost Viaduct'"	Blaenavon, Torfaen	Industrial Revolution	51.779242°N 3.090618°W	4 February 2001
Time Team attempt to find what is reputed to be the first railway viaduct. Built in 1790, to move coal efficiently from the mine to the Blaenavon Ironworks, one mountain over, horses drew wagons along its tracks for only about 10 years. Spoil from local mines has not only covered the viaduct, but filled the valleys so completely that it is difficult to find any clues as to where to dig. Thousands of tons of earth are moved to find the top of the viaduct, 12 meters below the modern surface. It is too dangerous to enter, but a camera is lowered for a peek. Elsewhere on the site, the remains of a manager's house and workers' cottages are found. As experimental archaeology, a small blast furnace is set up within the disused ironworks, and a Time Team logo (wooden pattern carved by Victor Ambrus) and cart wheels are cast.
66	6	"A Palace Sold for Scrap"	Rycote, Thame, Oxfordshire	14th century–Georgian	51.737413°N 1.035237°W	11 February 2001
The owners of Rycote House live in a lovely converted stable block, but they believe that the extremely grand house that once stood on the property and which hosted Tudor royalty burned down in 1745, and they want Time Team to investigate. In the trenches, no evidence of burning is found, but it seems that grand houses were built and rebuilt on the site from the 14th century through the Georgian era. Finds include a drainage tunnel dating from Capability Brown's landscaping work on the property. Historian Robin Bush returns from the Bodelian Library with an extraordinary catalogue from 1807, which details the sale of the grand house room by room. In nearby Thame, a townhouse contains a fireplace and doorways that possibly come from the sale. Food Historian Ivan Day cooks and serves sweetmeats and hippocras. Palace expert Simon Thurley joins the Team.
67	7	"An Iron-Age Roundhouse"	Salisbury Plain, Wiltshire	Iron Age	51.257064°N 1.737308°W	18 February 2001
The team are on Salisbury Plain, over 38,000 hectares of land in South West England owned by the MOD. Though the whole area is rich in ancient remains, they are concentrating on Beeches Barn, an unprepossessing field rumoured to conceal an Iron Age roundhouse. Alongside the dig, they are helping Ian Apter to build one of the team's most ambitious projects, a full-size thatched roundhouse. Early geophysics results indicate not one, but several banjo enclosures. Such features are always accompanied by Roman buildings. The aim is to get the site listed as an ancient monument, but time is running out. They are joined by army volunteers, and Iron Age expert Peter Reynolds. The many finds include a 2,000-year-old bone comb, a quern-stone and a Roman coin.
68	8	"The Bone Caves"	Alveston, Gloucestershire	Iron Age	51.582499°N 2.530707°W	25 February 2001
A pile of bones has been discovered in a narrow cave. They include cows, dogs and a human skull, which have been dated to the late Iron Age Celts. Local archaeologist Mark Horton is keen to discover whether this is a ritual site or just a rubbish pit; so Carenza joins a team of cavers to find out. Every handful of mud must be hauled out and sorted. Meanwhile bone experts Andy Currant and Margaret Cox examine the finds so far. One female skull shows clear evidence of a violent death; and another elderly female was suffering from Paget's disease. The quantity of dog bones may indicate an ancient dog cult, as described by Richard Massey from English Heritage. Archaeometallurgist Andrew Lacey casts a bronze dog model, designed by Victor. In spite of strong geophysics, the surface digs initially show no archaeology at all. Back in the lab, Margaret and Andy make a macabre discovery. Celtic expert Miranda Aldhouse-Green suspects this all hints at human sacrifice.
69	9	"The Inter-City Villa"	Basildon, Berkshire	Roman	51.509468°N 1.126886°W	4 March 2001
While laying Brunel's Great Western Railway line 50 miles from London, navvies discovered mosaic floors indicating a Roman villa. The mosaics were broken up and the whole site ignored, until recent photographs of cropmarks showed the outline of the villa, among other features. Geophysics signals are also very strong. The trouble is, the diggers can find no structure beneath the surface. They are joined by Bernard Thomason from English Heritage, mosaics expert David Neal, Tim Allen of Oxford Archaeological Unit, and Jillian Greenaway from Reading Museum. Reconstructor Chris Owen supervises the recreation of a mosaic using thousands of tesserae.
71	10	"Holy Island"	Lindisfarne, Northumberland	16th–17th century	55.670528°N 1.798928°W	11 March 2001
The team look at a wide range of historical deposits on the iconic Holy Island of Lindisfarne, including evidence of military activity in the 16th and 17th centuries. They are joined by John Heward (architectural historian), archaeologists Caroline Hardie and Richard Fraser, and pottery expert Jenny Vaughan. Phil Harding helps cooper Jim Newlands to make a traditional timber cask.
72	11	"The Leaning Tower of Bridgnorth"	Bridgnorth, Shropshire	Norman	52.532008°N 2.419660°W	18 March 2001
All that is left of Bridgnorth Castle is the 70-foot Norman tower. The team are in the park, trying to piece together what it looked like in its heyday, 900 years ago. They must dig outside the area of the scheduled monument. Phil and a group of enthusiasts recreate a 12th-century catapult known as a perrier. They are joined by castle specialist Philip Dixon, Mark Horton from Bristol University, Small Finds expert Lynne Bevan, and pupils from nearby Oldbury Wells School. Finally Philip is able to describe the construction and layout of the castle.
73	12	"Three Tales of Canterbury"	Canterbury, Kent	Roman, Medieval	51.278405°N 1.077766°E; 51.298132°N 1.075053°E; 51.279102°N 1.076270°E	25 March 2001
In highlights from a previous live dig, the team visit the ancient city of Canterbury to investigate three separate sites, all connected by their religious functions. There is a Roman temple, a monastery, and a medieval site devoted to the construction of sacred buildings. Celebrity guests Liza Tarbuck and Sandi Toksvig are in attendance.
74	13	"The Leper Hospital"	Winchester, Hampshire	Medieval	51.063401°N 1.280206°W	1 April 2001
Outside of the city boundaries of Winchester, in what is today known as Hospital Field, once stood the St Mary Magdalen Leper Hospital. Probably founded in around 1140 by Henry of Blois, the superb chapel was recorded in engravings as a ruin in the 17th century. Possibly complicating the search for the hospital, the entire field was used as an army camp during WWI, however, Time Team turns this to their advantage, as the medieval well that served the lepers was reused, with a wind pump, by the army camp, making it easier for geophysics to find. When the well is discovered, it uses up all the surveyor's tapes on hand, being more than 180 meters deep. Other trenches find the remains of the chapel, the Master's house, and the almshouses, as well as the cemetery, where a skull showing signs of leprosy is found. Within the chapel, an unusual double burial appears to be, as found in the records, the former Master of the hospital, followed almost 50 years later by his daughter. Victor sculpts a bust of a leper based on a skull excavated elsewhere. Nicholas Orme explains how lepers were viewed in the Middle Ages.
