= Time Team series 9 =

Season of television series

Time Team
- Season 9
- No. of episodes: 13

Release
- Original network: Channel 4
- Original release: 6 January – 31 March 2002

Series chronology
- ← Previous; Series 8 Next → Series 10

This is a list of Time Team episodes from series 9.

== Episode ==
=== Series 9 ===
Episode # refers to the air date order. The Time Team Specials are aired in between regular episodes, but are omitted from this list. Regular contributors on Time Team include: Tony Robinson (presenter); archaeologists Mick Aston, Phil Harding, Carenza Lewis, Ian Powlesland, Jenni Butterworth, Katie Hirst, Kerry Ely, Alice Roberts; Robin Bush, Guy de la Bédoyère, Dr. Peter Reynolds (historians); Victor Ambrus (illustrator); Stewart Ainsworth (landscape investigator); John Gater, Chris Gaffney (Geophysics); Henry Chapman (surveyor); Mark Corney (Roman specialist).

No. overall	No. in season	Title	Location	Historical period	Coordinates	Original release date
77	1	"London's First Bridge"	Vauxhall, London	Bronze Age	51.485502°N 0.127807°W	6 January 2002
At low tide on the foreshore of the Thames near Vauxhall Bridge in central London, a series of timber stumps is visible. How old are they, and what was their purpose? Time Team have the task of finding out, before the stumps are destroyed forever. They want to create a picture of the Bronze Age landscape here, 3,500 years ago. Post holes would indicate dry land building, while piles (pointed stakes driven into the ground) would indicate a structure above the river. To find out, they have to dig up one of the massive stumps. It's a race against time and tide to get it done in three days. Phil helps Damian Goodburn to make a simple piledriving rig with authentic tools. Stewart and Mick take a trip on the London Eye, to help them map the course of the ancient river. They are joined by Gustav Milne from University College London, and Jon Cotton from the Museum of London.
78	2	"The Roman's Panic"	Ancaster, Lincolnshire	Roman	52.980295°N 0.533225°W	13 January 2002
Time Team visits Ancaster, to which their resident Roman expert, Guy, recently moved. The town has yielded numerous Roman finds as well as a large cemetery with several sarcophagi from the period. In addition, the church of Ancaster is known in British archaeology for a Roman inscription dedicated to the deity Viridius. One question the team wants to tackle concerns why the Romans built a defensive system around the town in the late 3rd century CE. After some initial problems with the stratigraphy, Phil finds the cemetery level, while Carenza discovers a layer filled with jumbled up human remains mixed with other bones, probably representing disturbed burials. In the cemetery, Phil eventually uncovers the lid of a possible sarcophagus, and its excavation could thus require certain precautions due to the potential for lead poisoning and presence of biological hazards. However, the object proves to be a cist burial, as well as hazard-free. Incredibly, one of the cist slabs also turns out to contain yet another inscription to the god Viridius. In the end, the archaeologists suggest that the massive defences were ordered to be put up by the Roman central administration in Britain, and completely disrupted the original town layout. Archaeological or historical period(s): Roman Britain. Featuring from Time Team: Tony Robinson, Mick Aston, Phil Harding, Stewart Ainsworth, John Gater, Victor Ambrus, Carenza Lewis, Guy de la Bédoyère, Kerry Ely, Margaret Cox, Jeremy Taylor, Maggi Smith.
79	3	"Diving for the Armada"	Kinlochbervie, Sutherland	Tudor	58.433263°N 5.112194°W	20 January 2002
The team travel to West Scotland to investigate the wreck of a ship that may have been part of the Spanish Armada. As this is a classic case of rescue archaeology, they are joined by the government's Archaeological Diving Unit, whose director Martin Dean explains why this exercise is so important. An ROV is operated from the surface. Historian Felipe Fernández-Armesto talks about the role played by the weather in the Spanish Armada. Pottery specialist Duncan Brown looks at several remarkable finds, including some Maiolica ware. Both Phil and Tony do some diving. With the help of marine archaeologist Mark Lawrence, John uses a magnetometer to survey the seabed.
80	4	"The Naughty Monastery"	Chicksands, Bedfordshire	14th century	52.040364°N 0.366011°W	27 January 2002
The team are invited to investigate the officers' mess of a military base in Bedfordshire, once home to monks and nuns of a 14th century Gilbertine Order. It was an experiment in unisex living. Jenni of Time Team volunteers to live like a nun during the dig, and is initiated by nunnery expert Roberta Gilchrist. John Ette from English Heritage monitors proceedings, and they are also joined by historian Richard K. Morris and osteoarchaeologist Margaret Cox. Robin Bush tells the miraculous tale of the Nun of Watton.
81	5	"The Furnace in the Cellar"	Ironbridge Gorge, Shropshire	Industrial Revolution	52.646124°N 2.577345°W	3 February 2002
The team head for a pub in Leighton, whose cellar contains the remains of a blast furnace once used for smelting iron. When Tony arrives, test pits are already being dug, and Geophysics are busy surveying the car park. They are joined by Paul Belford from Ironbrige Gorge Museum; and Jonathan Roberts shows Phil how to make a triangular charcoal clamp similar to those used in the 17th century. Mick visits the nearby Blists Hill Victorian Town, where Roger Fewtrell demonstrates making a 24 pound cannonball. They are also joined by researcher Colin Thom, industrial archaeologist Rob Kinchin-Smith, archaeometallurgist Gerry McDonnell, and finds expert Ceinwen Paynton.
82	6	"An Ermine Street Pub"	Cheshunt, Hertfordshire	Roman	51.720624°N 0.054145°W	10 February 2002
It is 40 years since amateur archaeologists dug up Roman remains near Ermine Street, now hidden beneath Cheshunt Park. Time Team tell the story of the original excavation, using the detailed plan to conduct their own investigation. They believe the site's proximity to the road is the key to this dig. With some brilliant work by Stewart and John, they soon locate part of the road. Though frustratingly they cannot find any trace of it beneath the surface, they do find a brewery and possibly a pub. The brewing process is described by ancient technology expert Peter J. Reynolds. They conduct a mini-experiment comparing Roman surveying techniques with Henry's modern equipment. They are also joined by Roman experts Rosalind Niblett and Harvey Sheldon.
83	7	"Iron-Age Market"	Helford, Cornwall	Iron Age	50.077478°N 5.179886°W	17 February 2002
Two massive hill forts on the Lizard Peninsula in Cornwall, at Gear and Caer Vallack, have never been excavated. In fact, no major Cornish Iron Age site has ever been investigated. Time Team have been given the tall order of making some sense of these two sites in three days. For many years, a local farmer has been collecting Stone Age and Iron Age artefacts. Already the geophysics results are showing a potential wealth of ancient human activity. But the sites are so huge that the team will have to be very selective. They are joined by Ian Morrison from English Heritage, ancient technology expert Peter J. Reynolds, pottery experts Carl Thorpe and Henrietta Quinnell. Re-enactor David Freeman demonstrates a sling-shot, a simple but effective weapon. Phil and Peter visit a reconstructed round house nearby.
84	8	"Siege House in Shropshire"	High Ercall, Shropshire	English Civil War, Medieval	52.752459°N 2.602659°W	24 February 2002
The owners of a Tudor house, High Ercall Hall, want Time Team to investigate a bloody confrontation between the Roundheads and Cavaliers during the English Civil War, 350 years ago. In front of the house are four mysterious arches. Could they be relics of an older, medieval building, which apparently stood here for centuries before the present building? They are joined by buildings expert Richard K. Morriss, and Civil War specialist Glenn Foard.
85	9	"A Prehistoric Airfield"	Throckmorton, Worcestershire	Iron Age, Bronze Age	52.140294°N 2.042171°W	3 March 2002
Hoping to uncover Bronze Age burials, the team descend on a disused airfield. But initial finds suggest the Iron Age, while geophysics shows plenty of circles and some larger rectangular enclosures. Jacqui Wood makes prehistoric cheese, and cooks a fish stew. Bronze Age enthusiast Francis Pryor gets excited about some faint track marks. They are joined by Malcolm Atkin and Robin Jackson from Worcestershire County Council, Ian George from English Heritage, and Iron Age expert Jeremy Taylor.
86	10	"A Lost Roman City"	Castleford, Yorkshire	Roman	53.724441°N 1.355467°W	10 March 2002
The people of Castleford believe there is a Roman city beneath them, and several past digs have borne this out. Past discoveries include leather shoes, samian ware bowls and jewelry. There is certainly a vicus, a domestic settlement next to a fort. The team are also expecting to unearth some major buildings, and even a Roman road, Dere Street. But there is a lot of Victorian rubble in the way – not to mention the local football pitch.
87	11	"Every Castle Needs a Lord"	Beaudesert, Warwickshire	Medieval	52.293401°N 1.772098°W	17 March 2002
The medieval castle of Beaudesert in Henley-in-Arden suddenly vanished without trace, leaving a single stone on top of a mound. The people want to know what it looked like. "The Mount" as it's called by the locals, is a popular beauty spot and has suffered from erosion. Also, as it's a scheduled monument, there are limits to what digging can take place. The castle was built by the de Montforts in the early 12th century. Henry and Stewart create a simple 3D clay model of the building, which follows the natural contours of the hill. It looks as if the castle was demolished and the pieces sold off in the 15th century. Using authentic tools, bowyer Steve Ralphs makes a medieval longbow, which is tested against a crossbow of a similar period. Castles expert Sarah Speight describes daily life in the castle. Finds include a section of carved pestle and mortar.
88	12	"Steptoe Et Filius"	Yaverland, Isle of Wight	Iron Age, Bronze Age, Roman, Anglo-Saxon	50.671732°N 1.132267°W	24 March 2002
Two years ago, local archaeologist Kevin Trott discovered Roman remains in a trench being dug for a water pipe. Unfortunately the trench had to be closed, and now Time Team are having trouble finding it. While Phil and the diggers look for the original trench, a full-scale field-walking exercise reveals many finds, both Roman and Iron Age; including a lot of bronze jewellery, seeming to show industrial activity. There are hints that enamelling was carried out here, so they decide to make their own enamelled hare brooch. They start by smelting bronze from copper, tin and lead. Mick and Tony visit a nearby Roman villa with a detailed mosaic floor. On day three, Stewart spots some potential earthworks in a neighbouring field; so they decide to dig some exploratory trenches there. They end up with examples of activity from the Bronze Age, Iron Age, Roman occupation, and Anglo-Saxon period. To cap it all, at the end of day three they find a rare Iron Age burial. The team are joined for the first of many digs by Anglo-Saxon expert Helen Geake.
89	13	"Seven Buckets and a Buckle"	Breamore, Hampshire	Anglo-Saxon	50.954994°N 1.772017°W	31 March 2002
A Byzantine brass bucket - one of only 11 in the world - was found during a three-day live dig in a Saxon cemetery a year ago. Time Team are now returning to find out more about the people who lived and died here. Unusually, metal detectorists are called in to find non-ferrous metals, to complement Geophysics' magnetometer survey. They are joined by Anglo-Saxon specialist Andrew Reynolds, paleopathologist Alice Roberts and celebrity Sandi Toksvig. Sandi's ancestors were from Jutland, and Robin Bush argues that this whole area of Hampshire was actually occupied by Jutes before they were defeated by the Saxons under King Cadwalla in 686 AD. Using authentic techniques, Ray Walton replicates a brass bucket, complete with inscriptions and silvering, from scratch. Osteoarchaeologist Margaret Cox tries to make sense of the burials including rare double burials – one of which uniquely has a child placed between two men. Finds include weapons and an exquisite enamelled belt buckle; and three more of the mysterious buckets, which all fit one inside the other.
