= Time Team series 7 =

Season of television series

Time Team
- Season 7
- No. of episodes: 13

Release
- Original network: Channel 4
- Original release: 2 January – 26 March 2000

Series chronology
- ← Previous; Series 6 Next → Series 8

This is a list of Time Team episodes from series 7.

== Episode ==
=== Series 7 ===
Episode # refers to the air date order. The Time Team Specials are aired in between regular episodes, but are omitted from this list. Regular contributors on Time Team include: Tony Robinson (presenter); archaeologists Mick Aston, Phil Harding, Carenza Lewis, Mark Corney; historians Robin Bush and Guy de la Bedoyere; Victor Ambrus (illustrator); Stewart Ainsworth (landscape investigator); John Gater, Chris Gaffney (Geophysics); Henry Chapman (surveyor); bones expert Jackie McKinley.

No. overall	No. in season	Title	Location	Historical period	Coordinates	Original release date
46	1	"A Muslim Port in Spain"	Denia, Spain	Medieval, Islamic	38.840361°N 0.113166°E; 38.836944°N 0.101667°E	2 January 2000
1000 years ago, the port of Denia on the Costa Blanca used to be a thriving Islamic outpost in medieval Europe, before being Christianised in 1242. During this period Spain benefitted from a sophisticated Arab culture, including maths, astronomy and art. Members of Time Team are here to help with a major dig, before the site is redeveloped. They are particularly hoping for evidence of Islamic pottery and burials. Bone specialist Jackie looks at the many skeletons that have already been discovered. Phil has been invited to do a spot of scuba diving, all in the line of duty. Moroccan chef Mustapha Saaida tempts Carenza with some authentic spice-laden 900-year-old dishes, with ingredients from the local market. Mick "the Dig" is helping to uncover a kiln complete with pottery sherds. Victor sketches a complete landscape of the old town.
47	2	"The Mosaic at the Bottom of the Garden"	Cirencester, Gloucestershire	Roman	51.712179°N 1.961577°W	9 January 2000
In 300 A.D. Corinium Dobunnorum was England's wealthiest city next to Londinium. Now it's the pleasant Gloucestershire town of Cirencester, and Time Team are visiting the leafy suburban Chester Street, where they hope the back gardens will yield clues about the bustling Roman city and its main highway, Ermine Street. Could a Roman temple have occupied this site - or even rarer, an early Christian church? They need to knock on a few doors to ask about digging up their plots. There is a bottle of champagne for anybody who can find a tessellated pavement. They are joined by Roman architectural historian Tom Blagg, coin expert Richard Reece and mosaic expert David Neal. The Ermine Street Guard offer Tony venison stew, and use a wooden crane to erect a stone column, fashioned by mason Giles MacDonald. In the public presentation, Stewart outlines a picture of the whole city, ably assisted by Victor's drawing. Among many Roman finds are coins, a brooch, a spoon and a bone die.
48	3	"One of the First Spitfires Lost in France"	Wierre-Effroy, France	World War II	50.778998°N 1.741021°E	16 January 2000
On 23 May 1940 a Spitfire (P9373) flown by RAF pilot Paul Klipsch crashed into a field in Wierre-Effroy, France. Time Team, in concert with WWII aircraft historians and air crash investigator Steve Moss, try to find out what happened. They are joined by Klipsch's stepbrother, who last visited France on D-Day. Several residents of the village remember seeing the air battle and the crash, and Group Captain Allan Wright, who was flying in the same formation as Klipsch, comes along to help the investigation. The Spitfire wreckage is recovered, and investigation shows that Gunther Specht, flying a Messerschmitt Bf 110, shot down P9373. Experimental archaeology: Phil learns to repair a Spitfire wing flap with rudimentary tools.
49	4	"An Iron-Age Roundhouse and a Henge"	Waddon, Dorset	Iron Age, Medieval, Neolithic	50.670234°N 2.545086°W	23 January 2000
Time Team are doing a spot of gardening. Residents have presented them with evidence of historical activity, in the form of pottery shards and lumps and bumps in the landscape. While Victor sketches out possible buildings, Stewart tries to make sense of the trackways and earthworks in this spectacular landscape overlooking Portland Bill. Could there be a 4,000-year-old henge here? Back in Phil's trench in the garden, the first clear signs of a roundhouse emerge. Carenza helps potter Jim Newbolt to make and fire a collection of replica Iron Age and medieval pots.
50	5	"Hadrian's Wall"	Birdoswald, Cumbria	Roman	54.989232°N 2.604935°W	30 January 2000
The team carry out the first-ever excavation of a cemetery at a Roman fort. This one is a World Heritage Site on Hadrian's Wall, delineating Roman Britain's northern boundary. Dead soldiers would have been cremated, and Jackie makes an experimental funeral pyre with cuts of meat. Unfortunately a downpour extinguishes the flames; but a second attempt succeeds. Stewart is more interested in the erosion of the land, which may have been caused by flooding or an earthquake. After some frustrating dead ends, they eventually piece together a plausible description of the site, recovering some interesting finds before time runs out on the third day. They are joined by site director Tony Wilmott and Roman finds expert Lindsay Allason-Jones.
51	6	"In Search of the Earliest Traces of Mankind"	Elveden, Suffolk	Palaeolithic	52.392274°N 0.658067°E; 52.373908°N 0.753570°E	6 February 2000
Beneath a modern holiday village in Suffolk lies evidence of early Stone Age activity, 400,000 years ago. Human remains from this period in England are exceedingly rare, but the team hope to find animal and plant debris. They will have to dig deep. They are joined by palaeontologists Simon Parfitt and Andy Currant from the Natural History Museum. Andy explains the importance of voles in dating such early material.
52	7	"The Missing Cathedral and the Diabetic Prior"	Coventry, West Midlands	Medieval	52.409056°N 1.508557°W	13 February 2000
Coventry's modern cathedral replaced the old cathedral, bombed to destruction by the Luftwaffe in World War II. A third cathedral, St. Mary's, was also a Benedictine priory, demolished in the 16th century by Henry VIII. The west and east wings are still visible, but Time Team have been tasked to excavate what lies in between before the site gets re-developed. They want to create a 3D computer image, but the site is problematic for the geophysics team who are struggling to untangle all the conflicting signals. Their problems are compounded by rain and hail. Robin explains the reasons behind the building's destruction. Tony gets a guided tour of Coventry's sister cathedral at Lichfield, by historian Richard K. Morris. From a design by Victor, glass technician Colin Telford creates a stained glass panel, mixing authentic paint and firing the glass in a kiln. Meanwhile beautiful patterned floor tiles start to emerge, along with rose- and grape-shaped ceiling bosses. Phil uncovers a huge pier which would support the entire roof, though the spire would be wood rather than stone. And at the very end of day three, they uncover a stone-lined tomb, which has to be completely excavated; so uniquely the dig extends into a fourth day. They are joined by osteoarchaeologist Margaret Cox. For more information on the archeological findings by Time Team see the excavation chapter at St. Mary's Priory and Cathedral. A follow-up aired as Time Team (Specials) #6 in 2001.
53	8	"The Royalists' Last Stand"	Basing House, Hampshire	English Civil War	51.270322°N 1.052882°W	20 February 2000
Basing House in Hampshire, owned by the Paulet family was once one of the largest private homes in Britain until besieged and destroyed in the English Civil War. Most of the ruins are a Protected Ancient Monument, but Time Team is permitted to dig on the edge of where the Basingstoke Canal once cut through the ruins, and they find evidence of the final assault in 1645. Meanwhile, in a field across the road, it appears that Charles Paulet built a hunting lodge around 1690, but the field is the site of centuries of building and tearing down, and the archaeology is so confusing three days are not enough to work everything out. The English Civil War Society come to re-enact the siege of Basing House, setting up camp in the Great Barn where the original besiegers camped. They show how musket and pistol balls were cast.
54	9	"A Bronze-Age Barrow and Walkway"	Flag Fen, Cambridgeshire	Bronze Age	52.575829°N 0.184500°W	27 February 2000
The team have their work cut out in the Cambridgeshire fenland, looking for remnants of an ancient culture in the flat landscape. The long wooden track would function as a barrier, defence and ritual passage where votive offerings were placed in the water. At the end of it they hope to find a barrow - a circular Bronze Age burial mound. Dave Chapman constructs a bronze axe in a primitive furnace; while wood expert Maisie Taylor looks for a suitable handle in nearby woodland.
55	10	"In Search of the Palace of King Offa"	Sutton St Nicholas, Herefordshire	Anglo-Saxon, Medieval	52.109097°N 2.702415°W	5 March 2000
Time Team are in Freen's Court on the English-Welsh border. A recent aerial photograph shows parch marks. The kingdom of Mercia was ruled by the ruthless eighth century King Offa. Could this be his palace? All sorts of colourful legends are associated with the site. But they are having trouble locating the parch marks on the ground. As it's a protected monument, they must dig by hand under the watchful eye of English Heritage inspector Paul Stamper. There are some medieval remains but so far nothing Anglo-Saxon. They are joined by historian John Blair, County Archaeologist Keith Ray, and pottery expert Alan Vince. Phil helps experts Richard Darrer and Guy Apter to make a replica wooden cement mixer.
56	11	"A Roman Temple in Sight of the Millennium Dome"	Greenwich, London	Roman	51.478560°N 0.004462°E	12 March 2000
The team dig for Roman remains in Greenwich Park, London. They are joined by Hedley Swain from the Museum of London, Harvey Sheldon from the University of London and Mark Hassel from University College, London. Chris Owen (reconstructor) demonstrates Roman plastering techniques and ingredients, and paints a fresco with Victor. A remarkable find creates much excitement, boosting their hopes of identifying a Roman temple. Stewart suggests that Watling Street may have run through the park. For results and reconstruction see Greenwich park website.
57	12	"Nuns in Northumbria"	Hartlepool, County Durham	Anglo-Saxon, Medieval	54.695233°N 1.180206°W	19 March 2000
In 1833 builders in Hartlepool, Northumbria found name stones and skeletons in what once was the graveyard of Hartlepool Abbey. Time Team investigates what remains of the monastery led by St Hilda in the front gardens and traffic islands of the modern town. They find the remains of a substantial Saxon building, the remains of a high-status medieval building, a book clasp dating from around the time of the monastery, and the complete skeleton of a woman who died sometime between 630 and 770, according to later carbon dating. They also bind a book with an elaborate leather cover, decorated with a silver medallion of a lamb copied from a mold found on the site earlier.
58	13	"York"	York, Yorkshire	Roman, Viking, Medieval	53.959484°N 1.091878°W53.956753°N 1.075464°W53.961269°N 1.086653°W	26 March 2000
The team head to the ancient city of York for a special live dig. Finds include a Roman skeleton with hobnailed boots, and a Viking leather shoe. They are joined by Barney Sloane (site supervisor), Peter Addyman (director of the York Archaeological Trust), archaeologist Paul Thompson, osteoarchaeologist Margaret Cox, architectural historian Beryl Lott, finds expert Lindsay Allason-Jones, Denise Allen (glass specialist), Viking expert Patrick Ottaway and TV personality Sandi Toksvig. They build a brick kiln and make a Roman-style glass jug. Environmental archaeologist Andrew Jones sifts through organic debris to determine the diet of the inhabitants. Medical historian Carole Rawcliffe demonstrates some medieval herbal remedies.
