= Time Team series 10 =

Season of television series

Time Team
- Season 10
- No. of episodes: 13

Release
- Original network: Channel 4
- Original release: 5 January – 30 March 2003

Series chronology
- ← Previous; Series 9 Next → Series 11

This is a list of Time Team episodes from series 10.

== Episode ==
=== Series 10 ===
Episode # refers to the air date order. The Time Team Specials are aired in between regular episodes, but are omitted from this list

No. overall	No. in season	Title	Location	Historical period	Coordinates	Original release date
93	1	"Garden Secrets"	Raunds, Northamptonshire	Anglo-Saxon, Bronze Age	52.344620°N 0.539447°W	5 January 2003
Time Team investigates a back garden in Raunds, where a skeleton – aptly named "Henry" by his discoverer – has been found along with his Anglo-Saxon grave goods. The burial probably fits in with a number of other Saxon sites in the town and is seen in light of these. The team also look carefully at Henry himself, his attributes, anatomy and ailments, and have to tackle several logistical problems in association with excavating in such a constrained area as a garden. However, they also find the opportunity to extend the investigation across the fence to an allotment area behind the gardens. The experimental part of the program looks at various objects and medical remedies found in Anglo-Saxon society, presented by historical reenactors, while Victor recreates the appearance of Henry. In the end the archaeologists do confirm the presence of an Anglo-Saxon cemetery with various pieces of grave goods at the site, probably placed in relation to older Bronze Age burial mounds. Archaeological or historical period(s): Anglo-Saxon. Featuring from Time Team: Tony Robinson, Mick Aston, Phil Harding, Stewart Ainsworth, John Gater, Victor Ambrus, Carenza Lewis, Chris Gaffney, Henry Chapman, Helen Geake, Paul Blinkhorn, Kerry Ely, Margaret Cox, Alice Roberts, David Thorpe.
94	2	"Mosaics, Mosaics, Mosaics"	Dinnington, Somerset	Roman	50.917925°N 2.849794°W	12 January 2003
Time Team travels to Somerset to investigate the discovery of an exquisite Roman mosaic in a field. The geophysical survey clearly indicates the presence of a substantial and well-preserved villa on the site. One of the main problems they tackle is the development of the building complex through time. By targeted examination of the structural remains, the archaeologists uncover evidence of several phases from a more humble early timber building to a two-story grand villa with two large ranges and a courtyard gate structure. In the end, the site turns out to contain one of the largest Roman villas in the UK. Archaeological or historical period(s): Roman Britain. Featuring from Time Team: Tony Robinson, Phil Harding, Stewart Ainsworth, John Gater, Carenza Lewis, Guy de la Bédoyère, Chris Gaffney, Henry Chapman, Raysan Al-Kubaisi, Neil Holbrook, David S. Neal, Ceinwen Paynton, David Thorpe, Ian Powlesland, Brigid Gallagher, Stuart Prior.
95	3	"Peak District Practices"	Carsington, Derbyshire	Neolithic, Iron Age	53.080321°N 1.640260°W	19 January 2003
Time Team examines a mysterious cave in Derbyshire where cavers have found several skeletons, some of them newborn babies and the earliest dated to the Stone Age. Finds from the cave have also provided dates from the Iron Age and the Roman period. The excavation proves potentially quite hazardous, as the chambers and tunnels are filled with precariously heaped stones which threaten to scree if the safety shoring moves or breaks, and some areas are considered just too unstable to work in at all. The archaeologists also investigate a nearby Bronze Age barrow, which previously has been subject to illicit excavation. In the cave they find more human and animal remains, although how these got there remains subject to some debate. The mound gets confirmed as a barrow and undisturbed secondary burials are discovered as part of the structure. Archaeological or historical period(s): Neolithic, bronze age, Iron Age, Roman Britain. Featuring from Time Team: Tony Robinson, Mick Aston, Phil Harding, Stewart Ainsworth, John Gater, Victor Ambrus, Alice Roberts, Katie Hirst, Ceinwen Paynton, Andy Currant, Mike Parker Pearson.
96	4	"The Giant's Grave"	Fetlar, Shetland	Viking	60.594185°N 0.867257°W; 60.588197°N 0.832585°W	26 January 2003
Time Team investigates a Shetland back garden for remains of Viking occupation after the discovery of a number of soapstone objects there. They also open a mound feature nearby called "The Giant's Grave" to see whether or not in fact it may be a Scandinavian boat burial. In the garden they find more soapstone objects, slabs with crossmarks, small souterrains, and wall lines, indicating the presence of a Viking Age farmstead. Phil tries to carve a soapstone lamp as the experimental part of the program. The mound turns indeed out to be a looted Scandinavian boat burial, as the team finds patterns of iron rivets showing the imprint of the vessel and a small piece of its keel – and by excavating carefully, the archaeologists also locate a Viking tortoise brooch not taken by the looters. Archaeological or historical period(s): Viking Age. Featuring from Time Team: Tony Robinson, Mick Aston, Phil Harding, John Gater, Victor Ambrus, Henry Chapman, Alice Roberts, Sophie Jackson, David Thorpe, Jim Mower.
97	5	"Joust Dig It"	Greenwich, London	Tudor	51.482230°N 0.004201°W	2 February 2003
Time Team investigates Placentia, the Greenwich palace of king Henry VIII. They try to locate his royal armoury and the tiltyard, where the court and nobility would have jousted and been entertained in mock castles. In the experimental part of the program, Tony looks at how Tudor armour would have been made and gets a breastplate of the period hammered and fitted. The armoury as a turns out to be too elusive for the archaeologists, but localized amounts of hammer scale, a residual product of forging, indicate its presence there. However, the tiltyard complex with its associated structures, like the banqueting hall, are firmly located. Archaeological or historical period(s): Tudor. Featuring from Time Team: Tony Robinson, Mick Aston, Phil Harding, Stewart Ainsworth, John Gater, Victor Ambrus, Henry Chapman, Jonathan Foyle, Ceinwen Paynton, Sophie Jackson, David Thorpe, Catherine Edwards, Dana Goodburn-Brown.
98	6	"Digging Liberty"	Merton, London	Victorian	51.413519°N 0.183752°W	9 February 2003
Tony Robinson and the team are hunting for Liberty's first factory in South London. 'Liberty silks' still evoke images of opulence and beauty, of floating dresses and more leisurely times. But their hunt proves far from leisurely. Day three of the search brings the vital breakthrough – as well as an extraordinary attempt to recreate the 19th-century techniques of dying and printing those wonderful silks. Archaeological or historical period(s): Arts and Crafts.
99	7	"Death in a Crescent"	Bath, Somerset	Roman	51.387727°N 2.366371°W	16 February 2003
Time Team visit Bath to investigate parch marks seen in the park lawn of the Royal Crescent, indicating the presence of a large Roman road, possibly local remains of the Fosse Way. They also look behind the Crescent for Roman sarcophagi and wall lines found by builders of the now-gone St. Andrew's Church in the 1870s and noted by an antiquarian at the time. While the road ditches eventually yield Roman burials, the team does not locate any sarcophagi said to have been found there. Whether or not the large road, in fact, is the Fosse Way remains in the end uncertain, with arguments for both sides. Archaeological or historical period(s): Roman Britain. Featuring from Time Team: Tony Robinson, Mick Aston, Phil Harding, Stewart Ainsworth, John Gater, Guy de la Bédoyère, Henry Chapman, Alice Roberts, Ceinwen Paynton, Sophie Jackson, Catherine Edwards, Jim Mower.
100	8	"Back to Our Roots (Note: This is the official 100th episode and the team revisit the site they visited in episode 1)"	Athelney, Somerset	Anglo-Saxon, Iron Age, Viking	51.058863°N 2.934671°W	23 February 2003
Time Team revisits Athelney Abbey, the hideaway of Alfred the Great, and also the very first site investigated by the team one hundred programs earlier. Ten years of technological advances in the meantime has significantly enhanced their geophysical survey methods and changes in heritage management attitudes have also given them the permission to dig at the site. Slag and magnetic readings suggest that iron and steel was smelted and worked at Athelney, the latter being a good indication of Anglo-Saxon presence. At the abbey site itself Phil and his diggers uncover several burials. Reenactors show Anglo-Saxon dress and weaponry and their Viking counterparts as the experimental part of the program, while Carenza and Tony make – and burn – traditional Saxon cakes. The archaeologists find a number of objects, a Medieval graveyard associated with Athelney abbey, a metalworking complex, and a substantial defensive ditch dug in the Iron Age, but reused in the time of king Alfred. Archaeological or historical period(s): Iron Age, Anglo-Saxon. Featuring from Time Team: Tony Robinson, Mick Aston, Phil Harding, Stewart Ainsworth, John Gater, Victor Ambrus, Carenza Lewis, Robin Bush, Chris Gaffney, Henry Chapman, Gerry McDonnell, Ceinwen Paynton, David Thorpe, Ian Powlesland, Stuart Prior.
101	9	"Looking for the White House"	Kew Gardens, London	Georgian	51.483024°N 0.294354°W	2 March 2003
Time Team visits Kew Gardens to find the White House, part of the second Kew Palace complex and favourite home of mad king George III. While Carenza is shown how decorated wine glasses of the period are made, Stewart induced a lot of confusion regarding the exact placement of the building due to inaccuracies in the original 18th-century map of the area. However, in the end, both the archaeology and the architectural plan match each other. The archaeologists also locate a tunnel for sheltered transport of meals from the kitchen block to the palace dining halls by combining geophysical survey with keyhole test pits. Archaeological or historical period(s): Georgian. Featuring from Time Team: Tony Robinson, Phil Harding, Stewart Ainsworth, John Gater, Victor Ambrus, Carenza Lewis, Henry Chapman, Jonathan Foyle, Sophie Jackson, David Thorpe, Catherine Edwards, Jim Bower.
102	10	"Rescuing the Dead"	Leven, Fife	Bronze Age	56.207395°N 3.003143°W	9 March 2003
A building development threatens a Bronze Age cemetery in Fife, and Time Team is there to carry out rescue excavations together with County Archaeologists. The graves are Cist burials in various states of preservation placed around a large boulder in a dug pit. The boulder is shown to cover another cist, and several of the burials contain in fact bones – not a certainty, given the acidity of the local soil – and grave goods. With skulls initially being found as the only form of human remains, the archaeologists wonder whether the site only contained skulls originally. The boulder cist is capped by a large stone slab covering a void beneath, and the logistics of lifting it prove a challenge. In the end, they uncover a chamber with skeletal remains, thus showing soil acidity to be the main culprit for the dearth of bones other than skulls in the other graves. Archaeological or historical period(s): Bronze Age. Featuring from Time Team: Tony Robinson, Phil Harding, Stewart Ainsworth, John Gater, Francis Pryor, Henry Chapman, Kerry Ely, Margaret Cox, Alice Roberts, David Thorpe, Catherine Edwards, Dana Goodburn-Brown.
103	11	"Not a Blot on the Landscape"	Castle Howard, North Yorkshire	Stuart	54.120905°N 0.908317°W	16 March 2003
Time Team travels to Castle Howard to look for the lost village of Henderskelf, which was demolished around 1700 to make way for the new castle constructed on the estate and its formal gardens. But the exact placement of the village proves difficult to pin down. As the geophysical survey is unable to help much, the team has to rely on a map from 1694 and visible lumps and bumps. However, geophysics comes up with better results regarding their search for the lost village church of Henderskelf. Stewart advances their investigation significantly when he discovers a more detailed sketch of the village on the back of another old map from c. 1700 in the archives of Castle Howard, but the process of scaling it onto a modern map proves challenging. When this is done, the team realizes that some of their trenches have missed target buildings altogether. Armed with all this evidence, the archaeologists finally get to grips with the elusive Henderskelf – which seems to have been utterly removed between 1700 and 1720 when the new castle was erected. Archaeological or historical period(s): Stuart period Featuring from Time Team: Tony Robinson, Mick Aston, Phil Harding, Stewart Ainsworth, John Gater, Victor Ambrus, Carenza Lewis, Henry Chapman, Kerry Ely, Raysan Al-Kubaisi, Ceinwen Paynton, David Thorpe, Catherine Edwards, Brigid Gallagher.
104	12	"A View to a Kiln"	Sedgefield, County Durham	Roman	54.655019°N 1.459104°W	23 March 2003
Roman finds from Sedgefield prompt Time Team to visit a field and subject it to investigation. Air photographs and geophysical survey show tantalizing signs of activity below the turf, while fieldwalking provides even more finds. However, these finds lead to some confusion, as the archaeology suggests a low-status site with farms or workshops, but the coin finds are of high quality and value. The coins are decided to originally have formed a hoard, presenting certain bureaucratic issues for the metal detectorists who brought Time Team to the site. The experimental part of the program investigates how Roman coins would have been mass produced. In the end, the archaeologists discover a well-preserved pottery kiln in a settlement complex they suspect represent a civilian industrial site supplying the Roman market in Britain – all of which Phil gets to show the local MP, Tony Blair. Archaeological or historical period(s): Roman Britain. Featuring from Time Team: Tony Robinson, Mick Aston, Phil Harding, Stewart Ainsworth, John Gater, Victor Ambrus, Carenza Lewis, Guy de la Bédoyère, Kerry Ely, Ceinwen Paynton, Andrew Lacey, David Thorpe, Catherine Edwards, Brigid Gallagher, Stuart Prior, Dana Goodburn-Brown.
105	13	"Jailhouse Rocks"	Appleby-in-Westmorland, Cumbria	19th century – Victorian	54.578305°N 2.488259°W	30 March 2003
The constabulary in Appleby-in-Westmorland, Cumbria, know that their police station dates back to the first gaol ever on the site, built in the 1770s. They also know that two subsequent prisons, from the 1820s and the 1870s, also stood on the site. They've invited Time Team to see what remains of the former prisons underneath their car park. Trench 1 finds the remains of the room where the 1870s prison's treadwheel was, trench 2 finds the remains of the 1770s cell block, which has its own story to tell – in 1798 a prisoner tunneled out, leading trenches to be dug around the outside walls within the cells and these trenches filled with boulders, which remain under the car park. Trench 3 discovers the women's prison of the 1820s (previously prisoners were not segregated by sex), which had an underfloor heating system. One archaeologist volunteers to become a Victorian-era prisoner for 24 hours, put to hard labour breaking rocks, turning a crank handle to no purpose, and moving dirt from one pile to another. Finds include part of a warder's uniform and hobnail boots, and a bar from a prison window. Carenza acts as historian for this episode.
