= Time Signs =

- Directed by: Tim Taylor
- Presented by: Mick Aston
- Country of origin: United Kingdom
- Original language: English
- No. of series: 1
- No. of episodes: 4

Production
- Producer: Tim Taylor
- Running time: 30 minutes (including adverts)

Original release
- Network: Channel 4
- Release: 30 June – 21 July 1991

Related
- Time Team; History Hunters; Time Team Digs; Time Team Extra; Time Team Live; Time Team America

Time Signs is a British television series that aired on Channel 4 in 1991. Presented by Mick Aston, the series tells the story of a Devon valley throughout history. Phil Harding does some reconstruction archaeology. The series was narrated by Ray Brooks.

Time Signs was later developed into Time Team, the long-running archaeology television programme that aired from 1994 to 2014. Time Team has the same producer and also features Mick Aston and Phil Harding.

== Production ==
Time Signs was created in 1988 when producer Tim Taylor asked Mick Aston to present Time Signs, a history and archaeology series that tells the story of Wolf Valley in Devon. Aston asked archaeologist Phil Harding to do some reconstruction archaeology. Time Signs was filmed at what is now the Roadford Reservoir in Devon.

== Episodes ==
The four thirty-minute episodes aired from 30 June to 21 July 1991 on Channel 4. The series works back from the modern day to prehistoric times to explain the valley's history.

No.	Title	Original release date
1	"The Deserted Valley"	30 June 1991
2	"The Lost Village"	7 July 1991
3	"The Turning Wheel"	14 July 1991
4	"The Final Harvest"	21 July 1991
