= Bulford solar alignment =

Neolithic monument in Wiltshire, England

Bulford solar alignment (Wiltshire)

The Bulford solar alignment is a Neolithic monument in Bulford, Wiltshire, England. The monument consisted of two wooden poles, 120 metres apart, that were aligned with the summer and winter solstices. The monument was radiocarbon dated to c. 3000 BC. It has been suggested that the alignment was a prototype for that at nearby Stonehenge, constructed 500 years later.

The excavation of the site was undertaken by Wessex Archaeology from 2013 and led by Phil Harding. In addition to the two postholes, there are 48 pits within, and associated with, the site. Some of these pits were in alignment with the posts. Food residues from pottery sherds in the pits were radiocarbon dated to around 2950 BC. Archaeologists discovered artefacts including Grooved ware pottery, animal bone, worked flints, and charcoal. These suggest that a large number of people were gathering at the site for short periods of time, rather than a settled occupation. One of the artefacts found was a rare discoidal Neolithic knife that had been deposited in an upright position in one of the pits; Harding has suggested this artefact had symbolic significance in relation to the sun.

The monument was dated by both radiocarbon dating and through ancient astronomical mapping. Fabio Silva, an archaeoastronomer, analysed the alignment of the posts, and concluded that they lined up with the sunrise on the summer solstice and the sunset of the winter solstice in the year 2950 BC.

In addition to the Neolithic pits, archaeologists uncovered prehistoric ring ditches, a 7th to 8th century Anglo-Saxon cemetery and 20th-century military features.
