= Llygadwy =

Historic location in Wales

Coordinates: 51.884121°N 3.234015°W

Llygadwy is a locality near the village of Bwlch in the county of Powys in southeast Wales. The usual meaning of llygad in Welsh is 'eye' but it can signify a spring e.g. Llygad Llwchwr. The name therefore signifies the source of a stream known traditionally as 'Yw' though which is nowadays known as Ewyn Brook and which flows through a wide, though short, vale known traditionally as Ystradyw. The modern spelling appears to be a corruption of an earlier form Llygadyw. The spring arises where a band of non-marine limestone known as a calcrete outcrops within countryside otherwise dominated by sandstone rocks of the Old Red Sandstone.

== 2001 excavation ==
One (or more) people appear at some time to have salted the surroundings of a spring with archaeological relics for reasons that can only be a matter of speculation. In 2001, the popular UK archaeological television programme Time Team examined the site quite extensively. After some debate and the discovery of a number of artefacts, the falsified nature of the site was soon demonstrated. Most notably: 19th-century mortar was used to build an alleged "Norman" tower, supposedly Neolithic stones had been set in place in modern times, an aerial photo from 1972 showed the spring did not exist at all at that time, multiple genuine artefacts had been altered in modern times (a broken coin repaired with modern glue, a statuette inscribed on top of existing patina, numerous coins showing signs of modern cleaning methods), and modern barbed wire was found underneath a buried La Tène sword.

The site contains a manufactured spring to which artefacts of a range of ages - Bronze Age to Georgian - have been added to give it the semblance of being an important ritual centre. However one artefact in particular showed two important points of data: that the person or persons doing the "salting" did not understand stratigraphy, and that the salting took place after the mid-1980s. This artefact was a sword made either in Britain or the Continent sometime during the 2nd or 1st centuries BCE. A. P. Fitzpatrick wrote that it "was found to be securely stratified over a piece of barbed wire that was still attached to the fence post." The barbed wire itself had been manufactured after 1980, being dated at less than 20 years old.

The purpose of the salting remains obscure, but it may have been inspired by the construction of folly outbuildings "in the style of" ancient religious centres by a mid-19th century owner of the site. Again, the programme shows how this builder made errors in his construction which show that the building could not have been intended to be used for its apparent purpose. Whether this was a deliberate attempt to deceive, or a sort of homage by a person of antiquarian interests is unknown, and unlikely to be answered. However, the scale of the construction would have been difficult to conceal, so an innocent explanation is most plausible. The property owner, although he had invited the Time Team to investigate his property, declined to be interviewed or appear on the show, sending his son-in-law in his place.

Many of the artefacts used for this were genuine, which means that they were removed from their original context (at sites as far afield as Switzerland), thus losing most of their archaeological information. Further, since the artefacts had not been recorded into the archaeological record previously, their presence on this site attests to significant plundering of unknown sites to feed a market for illicit archaeological artefacts.
