= Tim Taylor (producer) =

British TV producer

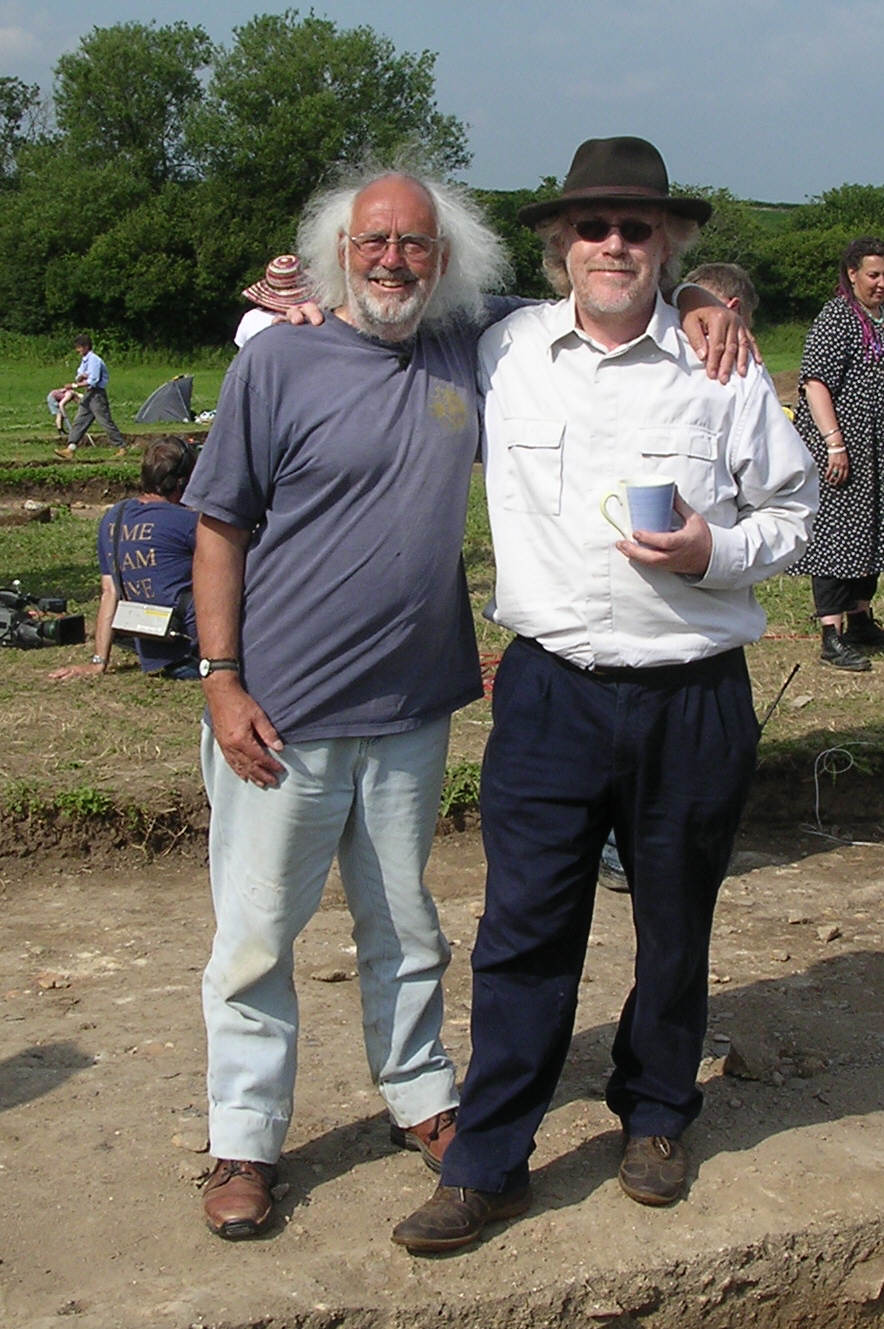
Tim Taylor (right) at the Time Team Big Roman Dig in 2005 with Mick Aston

Professor Timothy Taylor is a British television producer. He devised and produced Channel 4's archaeology series Time Team, and is an executive producer for Time Team America.

Taylor spent five years teaching, including two years working for Voluntary Service Overseas in Thailand, after completing a degree at the University of Birmingham and a Postgraduate Certificate in Education at the University of Exeter. On leaving teaching, he set up a company which specialised in producing educational programmes for schools. He is now an independent writer and producer of archaeology programmes. He devised the format for Channel 4's Time Team, which was developed from an earlier Channel 4 series Time Signs, first broadcast in 1991. Produced by Taylor, it featured Mick Aston and Phil Harding, who both went on to appear on Time Team. He also produced the spin-off series History Hunters, Time Team Digs and Time Team Live.

Taylor is a Visiting Industrial Professor for the Public Understanding of Archaeology at the University of Bristol, and has written books including The World Atlas of Archaeology in collaboration with Professor Mick Aston, The Ultimate Time Team Companion: An Alternative History of Britain, Behind the Scenes at Time Team, Digging the Dirt and Time Team: A Guide to the Archaeological Sites of Britain and Ireland.
