= History Hunters =

- Presented by: Tony Robinson
- Country of origin: United Kingdom
- No. of series: 1
- No. of episodes: 7

Production
- Producer: Tim Taylor
- Running time: 60 minutes (including adverts)

Original release
- Network: Channel 4
- Release: 21 November 1998 – 16 January 1999

Related
- Time Signs; Time Team; Time Team Digs; Time Team Live; Time Team Extra; Time Team America

History Hunters is a British television series that aired on Channel 4 from 1998 to 1999. Presented by the actor Tony Robinson, the show was a spin-off of the archaeology series Time Team, first broadcast on Channel 4 in 1994. The series is also known as Time Team: History Hunters.

Each episode of History Hunters featured people trying to discover more about an area and its history.

== Production ==
The programme's producer was Tim Taylor, the creator of Time Signs and executive producer of Time Team.

== Episodes ==
There were seven episodes of History Hunters shown on Saturdays from 21 November 1998 to 16 January 1999. Each episode features three teams trying to investigate the history of a community by using resources that are available to anyone. The teams have only two days to find out as much as they can. They have the help of a team of experts. The episode looking at malting in Marshfield, South Gloucestershire was shot as the pilot in February 1998, and the experts included Gloucester archivist David Smith and local buildings expert Linda Hall. Local farmer Dick Knight described how his grandfather was the last working maltster in the village. Decision-makers at Channel 4 liked the programme and gave the go-ahead for six more, but showing them on Saturday afternoons was doomed to failure and the series sank without trace. The seven programmes were never repeated.

No.	Title	Location	Original release date
1	"Crystal Palace"	Crystal Palace, South London	21 November 1998
The three teams look into the Crystal Palace, the home of the Great Exhibition, that burnt down in the 1930s. They look into why the Palace was moved from Hyde Park and what the cause of the fire that destroyed it was.
2	"Pleasure Beach"	Blackpool, Lancashire	28 November 1998
Three teams of Blackpool people look into the town's history and why it became the tourist hotspot it is. They also look into why the town became popular with the working class.
3	"Three Pubs"	Nottingham, Nottinghamshire	5 December 1998
Each team look into the history of three pubs, The Bell Inn, Ye Olde Salutation Inn and Ye Olde Trip To Jerusalem, each of which claims to be the oldest in Nottingham.
4	"Watchmaking Sector"	Coventry, West Midlands	12 December 1998
The teams look into the remains of Coventry's watch making industry that thrived in the 18th and 19th centuries.
5	"Scottish Border and Related Ballads"	Liddesdale, Scottish Borders	19 December 1998
In the 15th and 16th century the Scottish Borders were a lawless place, and the team try to discover the truth behind the ballads of the time and whether the Borders' residents today are related to the 15th and 16th century inhabitants.
6	"Middle Age Abbey"	Burton upon Trent, Staffordshire	9 January 1999
During the Middle Ages Burton upon Trent had the most important abbey in central England, and teams look into one building each, with each building thought to have connections to the abbey.
7	"Malting"	Marshfield, Gloucestershire	16 January 1999
Marshfield used to be a centre for brewing, the teams look into the village's malting past. One team look for the physical remains of the industry, another looks into one family's involvement and the third team into how malting affected the agricultural landscape.

== See also ==
- List of Time Team episodes
- Time Team Specials
- Time Team Others
- Time Signs
- Time Team America
- Time Team Live
- Time Team Extra
- Time Team Digs
- Time Team
