= Mark Corney =

English archaeologist

- Died: 2023
- Occupation: Archaeologist

Mark Corney (died 2023) was an English archaeologist and numismatist. He was also an author, having written The Roman Villa at Bradford on Avon in 2003.

== Career ==
Corney was Senior Investigator with the Royal Commission on the Historic Monuments of England, later becoming a freelance archaeologist. He was also in the archaeology department at the University of Bristol.

Corney appeared in 22 episodes of Time Team between 1997 and 2013. When he was 12 or 13, Corney visited the Roman fort of Branodunum in Brancaster, Norfolk. He revisited the site with Time Team in 2012.

In 2003, Corney published The Roman Villa at Bradford on Avon.

== Personal life ==
In 2019, Corney was taken to hospital with a pain in his chest. He was diagnosed with pneumonia.

Corney died in late 2023; his funeral was on 5 January 2024.
