= Time Team America =

- Country of origin: United States
- No. of seasons: 2
- No. of episodes: 9

Production
- Executive producers: David Davis (OPB); Tim Taylor (C4I Distribution)
- Running time: 60 minutes

Original release
- Network: PBS
- Release: July 8, 2009 – July 7, 2014

Related
- Time Team; Time Team Digs; Time Team Extra; History Hunters; Time Team Live

Time Team America is an American television series that airs on PBS. It premiered on July 8, 2009. It is an Oregon Public Broadcasting adaptation of the British show Time Team, produced in collaboration with Channel 4, which commissioned the original show, in which a team of archeologists and other experts are given 72 hours to excavate an historic site.

The U.S. version features "freelance and university-affiliated experts [who] mostly join existing excavations ... [and] arrive with resources that the archaeologists already on the case usually can’t afford and specific questions that, if answered, will advance the understanding of the site."

A second season was announced on October 18, 2011, scheduled to shoot during the summer of 2012 and to air in 2013. On December 20, 2011, PBS announced that Justine Shapiro would host the second season.

== Episodes ==
When PBS introduced a video player on its website in mid-April 2009, an episode of Time Team America became the most viewed.

Original air dates are as announced by PBS, but may vary by PBS station.

=== Season 1 (2009) ===
No.	Title	Location	Original release date
1	"Fort Raleigh, North Carolina"	Roanoke Island, North Carolina	July 8, 2009
The team travels to Roanoke Island to look for evidence of the Lost Colony of Fort Raleigh and learn what life might have been like for the first English colonists.
2	"Topper, South Carolina"	Topper, South Carolina	July 15, 2009
Time Team America goes to the woodlands near the Savannah River in South Carolina to help with the excavation of the Topper site. One part of the team will dig a Clovis quarry, while the other will investigate a controversial cultural layer claimed to be pre-Clovis.
3	"New Philadelphia, Illinois"	New Philadelphia, Illinois	July 22, 2009
New Philadelphia was the first town in the United States platted and registered by an African American, Free Frank McWorter, some 30 years before the Civil War. Time Team America joins the ongoing research of New Philadelphia to help search for the town's schoolhouse.
4	"Range Creek, Utah"	Range Creek, Utah	July 29, 2009
Time Team America was invited to Range Creek in the Book Cliffs in Utah to help with the research into the extraordinary well-preserved pit-houses and granaries of Fremont people.
5	"Fort James, South Dakota"	Fort James, Hanson County, South Dakota	August 5, 2009
Fort James in South Dakota was one of the few stone forts on the American frontier, and it was abandoned only a few years after it was built in the 1860s. The team goes on a mission to find out how big the fort was to protect its archaeology for future research.

=== Season 2 (2014) ===
After a four-year gap, Videotext Communications/PBS produced the second season, which aired in 2014.

No.	Title	Location	Original release date
1	"The Search for Josiah Henson"	Maryland	June 16, 2014
2	"The Bones of Badger Hole"	Oklahoma	June 23, 2014
3	"Lost Civil War Prison"	Georgia	June 30, 2014
4	"The Lost Pueblo Village"	Colorado	July 7, 2014

== Reviews ==
A Newsday reviewer wrote

"Time Team America at moments, employs [an] approach much in favor at PBS, which worries – needlessly, I think – that the only way to make serious subjects appealing to the attention-deficit-disordered youth of our TV nation is to throw in plenty of zing, zest and zip. ... But don't hold any of this against the show, because it's engaging, thoughtful, smart, nicely produced and really, really interesting."

== DVD ==
All five episodes of the first season have been released on separate DVDs.

== See also ==
- List of Time Team episodes
- Time Team Specials
- Time Team Others

== Bibliography ==
- Feinman, G. (1 April 2010). "Science and public debate: A role for archaeology in today's news media". Anthropology News. Vol. 51, no. 4. pp. 12–13.
