= Time Team Extra =

British television series

- Presented by: Robin Bush
- Country of origin: United Kingdom
- No. of series: 1
- No. of episodes: 8

Production
- Running time: 30 minutes (including adverts)

Original release
- Network: Channel 4
- Release: 11 January – 8 March 1998

Related
- Time Signs; Time Team; History Hunters; Time Team Digs; Time Team Live; Time Team America

Time Team Extra is a British television series that aired on Channel 4 in 1998. Presented by Robin Bush, it was a companion programme to the archaeology series Time Team, that first aired on Channel 4 in 1994.

Time Team Extra is an eight-part series, with each episode accompanying an episode of Time Team's fifth series. The episodes looked more into the history of the site being excavated.

== Production ==
The location footage for the series was filmed across the UK and Ireland, including Hampton Court Palace, Jorvik Viking Centre, Stonehenge and Mellifont Abbey. The interviews with the guest were filmed at Hughenden Manor in Buckinghamshire, in the library of Benjamin Disraeli.

== Episodes ==
Each episode of Time Team Extra is thirty minutes long and originally aired from 11 January to 8 March 1998 on Channel 4. In each episode, historian Robin Bush and a guest look back at the week before's Time Team episode. Time Team's fifth series aired from 4 January to 1 March 1998.

No.	Title	Original release date
1	"Episode One"	11 January 1998
Looking back at Time Team's dig in Richmond, Robin Bush interviews Dr. Simon Thurley, Director of the Museum of London.
2	"Episode Two"	18 January 1998
Bush talks to Dr. Francis Pryor, the President of the Council for British Archaeology and looks back at the episode in Greylake.
3	"Episode Three"	25 January 1998
Following Time Team's episode in Orkney, which looked into Viking burial mounds, Robin Bush speaks to Viking Britain expert John Hunter, a professor at the University of Birmingham.
4	"Episode Four"	1 February 1998
Bush speaks to Guy de la Bédoyère about the Time Team Roman dig at Turkdean in the Cotswolds.
5	"Episode Five"	8 February 1998
Robin Bush and his guest Professor Richard Bradley, of the University of Reading, look into Beaker culture following the Time Team episode based in Deià in Mallorca.
6	"Episode Six"	15 February 1998
Bush talks to Professor Ronald Hutton about the Time Team episode based at a medieval manor house in Aston Eyre in Shropshire.
7	"Episode Seven"	1 March 1998
Joined by Dr. Peter Harbison, of the Royal Irish Academy and an expert of the early church in Ireland, Bush looks into St. Patrick's first church, the subject of the previous Time Team episode.
8	"Episode Eight"	8 March 1998
Assisted by Dr. Richard Lomas of the Durham University, an expert on early medieval village life, Robin Bush looks into the former village of High Worsall in Yorkshire.

== See also ==
- List of Time Team episodes
- Time Team Specials
- Time Team Others
