= Time Team specials =

Time Team
- Specials
- No. of episodes: 59

Release
- Original network: Channel 4
- Original release: 28 December 1997 – 7 September 2014

This is a list of Time Team special episodes that aired between 1997 and 2014. These special episodes often depart somewhat from the regular Time Team format, by revisiting previous sites to do a follow-up story; travelling outside the UK to excavate other sites of interest; chronicling digs overseen by other organisations; or using information gleaned from other Time Team episodes to draw a more complete picture of ordinary life during a particular historical era. Other specials may focus on a dig with a particular holiday theme; a more complex excavation over a longer period than the standard three days; or a visit to a particularly famous historical site.

Most shows fit within a 1-hour time-slot (approx. 46–49 minutes of content), although some (e.g. episodes 3, 9, 26, 33, 35, 36) are longer at 1.25 hours of content, and some (i.e. episode 24) at 1.75 hours. Regular contributors include: presenter Tony Robinson; archaeologists Mick Aston, Phil Harding, Carenza Lewis, Helen Geake; historians Francis Pryor; Robin Bush, Guy de la Bedoyere, Sam Newton, Alex Langlands; illustrator Victor Ambrus; landscape investigator Stewart Ainsworth; geophysics John Gater, Chris Gaffney; surveyor Henry Chapman; and, Roman specialist Mark Corney.

== Episodes (1997-2000) ==
=== 1997 ===
No. overall	No. in season	Title	Location	Coordinates	Original release date
22	1	"Christmas Special – Much Wenlock"	Much Wenlock, Shropshire	52.59603°N 2.55719°W	28 December 1997

=== 1999 ===
No. overall	No. in season	Title	Location	Coordinates	Original release date
44	2	"Christmas Special – Barley Hall"	Barley Hall, York	53.961241°N 1.082367°W	19 December 1999
45	3	"The Mystery of Seahenge"	Holme-next-the-Sea, Norfolk	52.967997°N 0.518536°E	29 December 1999

=== 2000 ===
No. overall	No. in season	Title	Location	Coordinates	Original release date
59	4	"The Real King Arthur"	Tintagel Castle, Cornwall	50.667974°N 4.759928°W	24 December 2000
60	5	"The Mystery of Mine Howe"	Tankerness, Orkney	58.938400°N 2.851794°W	27 December 2000

== Episodes (2001-2005) ==
=== 2001 ===
No. overall	No. in season	Title	Location	Coordinates	Original release date
70	6	"Coventry's Lost Cathedral"	Coventry, West Midlands	52.409°N 1.508833°W	8 March 2001
75	7	"Island of the Eels"	Ely, Cambridgeshire	52.395086°N 0.267727°E	17 May 2001
76	8	"Dinosaur Hunting"	Dinosaur Belt, Montana, US	47.811155°N 112.182327°W	30 December 2001

=== 2002 ===
No. overall	No. in season	Title	Location	Coordinates	Original release date
90	9	"The Big Dig in Canterbury"	Canterbury, Kent	51.277013°N 1.081759°E	15 April 2002
91	10	"Londinium, The Edge of Empire"	London	51.514915°N 0.093061°W	22 April 2002
92	11	"The Wreck of Colossus"	St Mary's, Isles of Scilly	49.935975°N 6.322117°W	31 October 2002

=== 2003 ===
No. overall	No. in season	Title	Location	Coordinates	Original release date
106	12	"Hadrian's Well"	TBA	51.514915°N 0.093061°W	10 April 2003
107	13	"Big Dig, The Hole Story"	Canterbury, Kent	TBA	29 December 2003

=== 2004 ===
No. overall	No. in season	Title	Location	Coordinates	Original release date
120	14	"Sheffield Steel City"	Sheffield, South Yorkshire	53.385858°N 1.465609°W; 53.401319°N 1.520046°W; 53.381912°N 1.475182°W	22 March 2004
122	15	"The House in the Loch"	Loch Tay, Perthshire	56.571940°N 4.082767°W	19 April 2004
123	16	"The Ten Million Pound House"	Ightham Mote, Kent	51.258473°N 0.269655°E	3 May 2004
124	17	"D-Day"	D-Day, Normandy	49.324187°N 0.595621°W	31 May 2004

=== 2005 ===
No. overall	No. in season	Title	Location	Coordinates	Original release date
138	18	"King of Bling"	Prittlewell, Essex	51.553514°N 0.708365°E	13 June 2005
139	19	"Britain's Lost Roman Circus"	Colchester, Essex	51.883429°N 0.896732°E	20 June 2005
140	20	"Life on the Edge 1000 B.C."	Washingborough, Lincoln	53.229263°N 0.440213°W	27 June 2005
141	21	"Journey to Stonehenge"	Durrington, Wiltshire	51.191838°N 1.783245°W	28 November 2005

== Episodes (2006-2010) ==
=== 2006 ===
No. overall	No. in season	Title	Location	Coordinates	Original release date
142	22	"The Big Roman Villa"	Dinnington, Somerset	50.918038°N 2.849563°W	8 January 2006
156	23	"Buried By The Blitz"	Shoreditch Park, London	51.534794°N 0.087354°W	29 October 2006
157	24	"Big Royal Dig"	Windsor Castle, Palace of Holyroodhouse and Buckingham Palace	51.483333°N 0.604167°W 55.9525°N 3.1725°W 51.500833°N 0.141944°W	31 December 2006

=== 2007 ===
No. overall	No. in season	Title	Location	Coordinates	Original release date
165	25	"The God Of Gothic"	Ramsgate, Kent	51.328172°N 1.409773°E	1 March 2007
172	26	"Britain's Drowned World"	TBA	51.079069°N 1.672726°E	24 April 2007
173	27	"Jamestown: America's Birthplace"	Virginia, US	37.210397°N 76.780618°W	1 May 2007
174	28	"Secrets of the Stately Garden"	Prior Park	51°21′54″N 2°20′40″W	27 August 2007

=== 2008 ===
No. overall	No. in season	Title	Location	Coordinates	Original release date
177	29	"Codename: Ainsbrook"	Thirsk, Yorkshire	54.233°N 1.343°W	14 January 2008
184	30	"The Real Knights of the Round Table"	Windsor Castle, Berkshire	51.483333°N 0.604167°W	25 February 2008
190	31	"The Lost Dock of Liverpool"	Liverpool, Merseyside	53.403030°N 2.988416°W	21 April 2008
191	32	"Swords, Skulls and Strongholds"	TBA	TBA	19 May 2008
192	33	"The Lost WWI Bunker"	Flanders, Belgium	50.872053°N 2.959452°E	10 November 2008
193	34	"The Mystery of the Roman Treasure"		TBA	26 December 2008

=== 2009 ===
No. overall	No. in season	Title	Location	Coordinates	Original release date
207	35	"Henry VIII's Lost Palaces"	England	TBA	13 April 2009
208	36	"The Secrets of Stonehenge"	Stonehenge, Wiltshire	51.178889°N 1.826111°W	1 June 2009
209	37	"Dover Castle"	Dover, Kent	51.129628°N 1.321437°E	19 December 2009

=== 2010 ===
No. overall	No. in season	Title	Location	Coordinates	Original release date
215	38	"Nelson's Hospital"	Gosport, Hampshire	50.786°N 1.124°W	17 May 2010
217	39	"The Secrets of Westminster Abbey"	Westminster Abbey, London	TBA	28 June 2010
220	40	"The Real Vikings"	TBA	TBA	11 October 2010

== Episodes (2011-2014) ==
=== 2011 ===
No. overall	No. in season	Title	Location	Coordinates	Original release date
231	41	"Wars of the Roses"	Bosworth, Leicestershire	TBA	16 March 2011
236	42	"The Somme's Secret Weapon"	Mametz, Somme, France	TBA	14 April 2011
238	43	"Castle of the Saxon Kings"	Bamburgh, Northumberland	55°36′14″N 1°43′19″W	24 April 2011
239	44	"Looking Underground"	N/A	N/A	1 May 2011
240	45	"Boudica's Lost Tribe"	N/A	N/A	4 May 2011
241	46	"The Way We Lived"	N/A	N/A	8 May 2011
242	47	"Brunel's Last Launch"	N/A	N/A	10 November 2011

=== 2012 ===
No. overall	No. in season	Title	Location	Coordinates	Original release date
251	48	"Searching for Shakespeare's House"	Stratford-upon-Avon	52°11′26″N 1°42′27″W	11 March 2012
255	49	"Secrets of the Saxon Gold"	TBA	N/A	22 April 2012
258	50	"Rediscovering Ancient Britain"	South Dorset Ridgeway, Dorset	N/A	17 June 2012

=== 2013 ===
No. overall	No. in season	Title	Location	Coordinates	Original release date
272	51	"Britain's Stone Age Tsunami"	N/A	N/A	30 May 2013
273	52	"The Secret of Lincoln Jail"	N/A	N/A	30 June 2013
274	53	"The Lost Submarine of WWI"	N/A	N/A	7 July 2013
275	54	"1066: The Lost Battlefield"	Battle, East Sussex, England	N/A	1 December 2013
276	55	"The Madness of Bedlam"	Bishopsgate, City of London	N/A	1 December 2013

=== 2014 ===
No. overall	No. in season	Title	Location	Coordinates	Original release date
277	56	"The Edwardian Grand Designer"	Castle Drogo, Drewsteignton, Devon, England	N/A	23 February 2014
278	57	"Britain's Bronze Age Mummies"	Low Hauxley, Northumberland, England	N/A	2 March 2014
279	58	"Secrets of the Body Snatchers"	N/A	N/A	31 August 2014
280	59	"The Boats That Made Britain"	Dover, Kent	N/A	7 September 2014

== Episodes (Revival) ==
=== 2023 ===
No. overall	No. in season	Title	Location	Coordinates	Original release date
285	60	"Digging Band of Brothers"	Aldbourne, Wiltshire	N/A	30 September 2023

=== 2024 ===
No. overall	No. in season	Title	Location	Coordinates	Original release date
291	61	"Sutton Hoo Ship: Rebuilding a Legend (Part 1)"	Sutton Hoo, Suffolk	N/A	1 June 2024
292	62	"The Princely Burial"	Cherington, Cotswold	N/A	21 December 2024

== See also ==
- List of Time Team Episodes
- Time Team Live
- Time Team History Hunters
- Time Team Digs
- Time Team Extra
- Time Team America
- Time Team Others
