= Phil Harding (archaeologist) =

English archaeologist (born 1950)

Phil Harding DL FSA
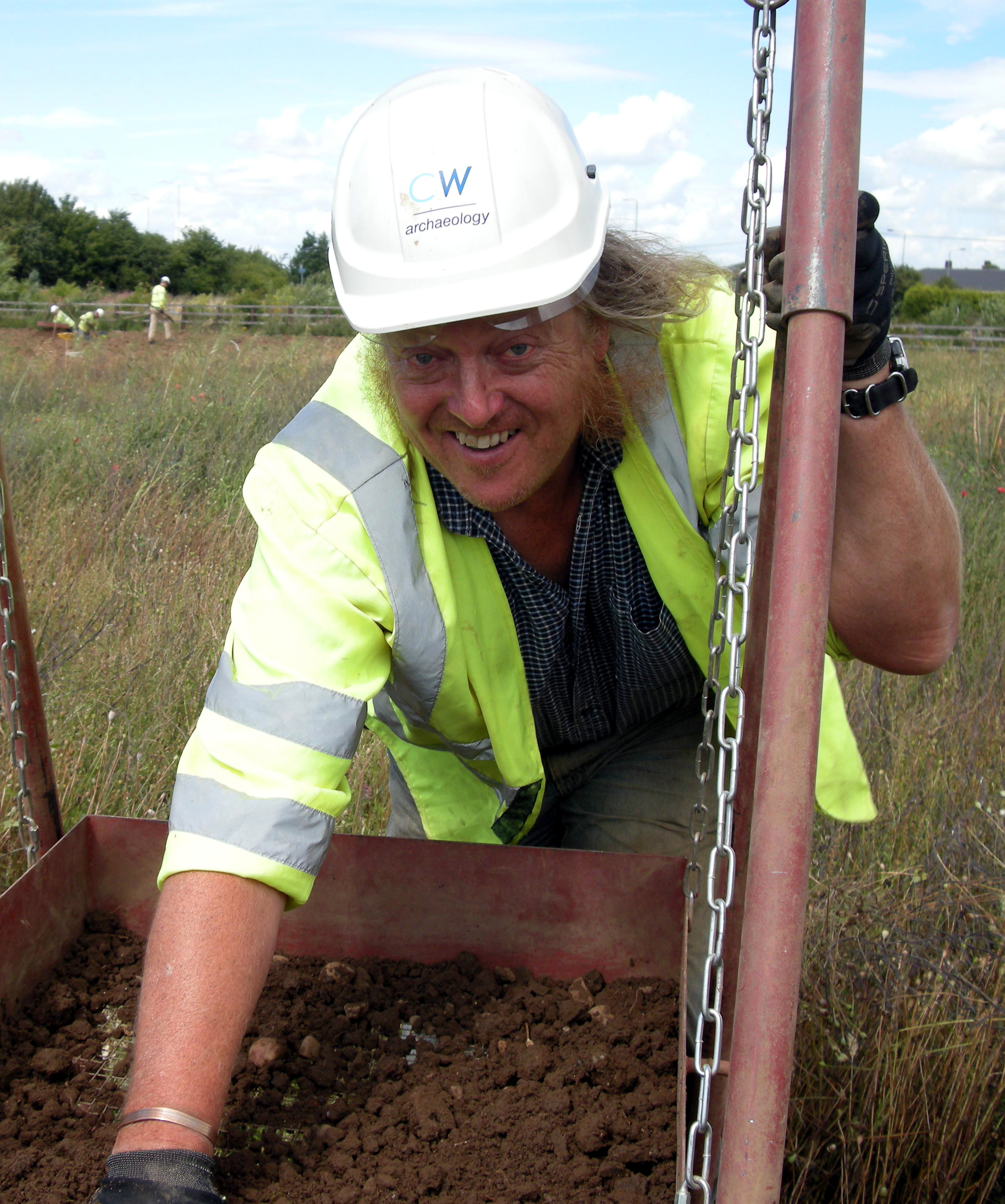
- Phil Harding sifting for flint in 2009
- Born: 25 January 1950 (age 76); Oxford, England
- Occupation: Archaeologist
- Years active: 1971–present
- Known for: Time Team

Philip Anthony Harding DL FSA (born 25 January 1950) is a British field archaeologist. He became a familiar face on the Channel 4 television series Time Team.

Harding trained on various excavations with the Bristol University Extra Mural Department and other bodies from 1966; he has been a professional archaeologist since 1971, working mainly for Wessex Archaeology. He is an expert in the use of stone tools by neolithic people and is himself able to make such tools by flint knapping.

== Life and career ==
=== Early life ===
Born in Oxford on 25 January 1950 and brought up in Wexcombe, Wiltshire, Harding was educated at Marlborough Royal Free Grammar School in Marlborough. As a young boy, he became fascinated with the Stone Age. He learned flint-knapping from his uncle, Fred, and in only a few months became a skilled knapper, crafting many hunting tools from pieces of flint. He made his first archaeological finds digging up his parents' garden, much to the annoyance of his mother, Elsie. In 1966, while still at school, he attended a training excavation by Bristol University Extra Mural Department in Fyfield and West Overton. Since then, he has dug every year, though at first his archaeological activities had to be fitted into holidays and any spare time.

=== Career ===
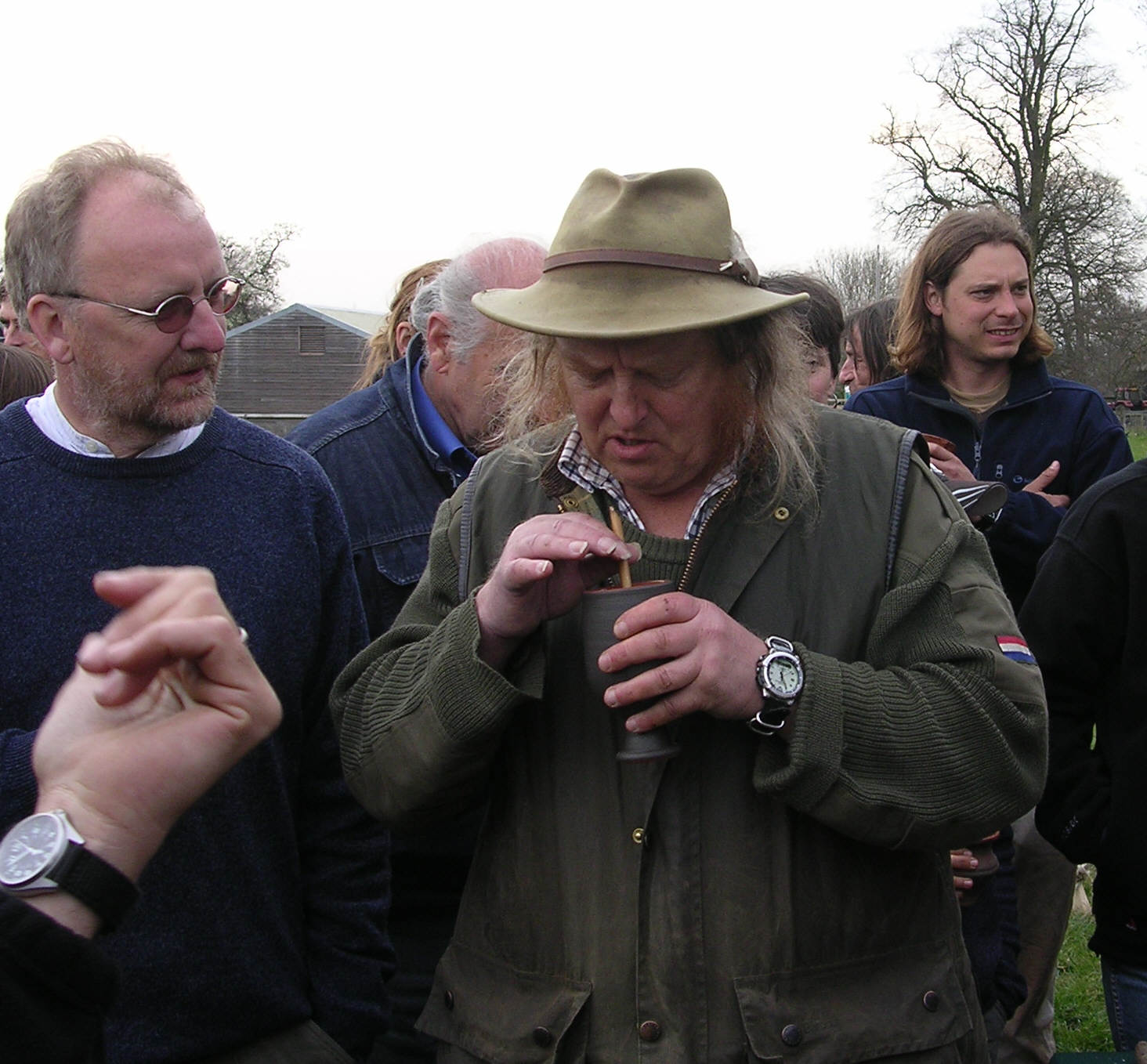
Phil Harding (wearing hat) with John Gater filming Time Team

After Harding left school, he worked in a puppet factory in Marlborough until he became a full-time archaeologist in 1971. He worked initially for the Southampton City Council Archaeology Unit, combining this with five seasons of excavations (1972–1976) run by the British Museum at the Neolithic flint mines of Grimes Graves, Norfolk. He has since become an acknowledged expert on flint-knapping and is skilled in lithic reduction using both percussive techniques and pressure flaking, in which, instead of striking the flint with blows, pressure is exerted on the edges to shape the tool.

From the mid-1970s, he worked on excavations in Berkshire, Hampshire, Dorset, Wiltshire and the Isle of Wight for the Department of the Environment (DOE). In 1979, the archaeological section of the DOE for the region became Wessex Archaeology, a non-profit organisation which is one of the biggest archaeological practices in the country. He continues to work for Wessex Archaeology.

He has been a member of the Institute of Field Archaeologists since 1985, and in 2006 was elected a Fellow of the Society of Antiquaries of London. On 24 July 2008, he received an honorary doctorate from the University of Southampton in archaeology. As a qualified SCUBA diver, he is the president of the Nautical Archaeology Society, a Portsmouth-based charity formed to further interest in nautical cultural heritage. Since 2015, Harding has been an archaeological supervisor for the veteran support charity Waterloo Uncovered, which conducts archaeology on the battlefield of Waterloo alongside veterans and serving personnel.

In 2010, the radio series A History of the World in 100 Objects featured Harding speaking on the creation of pre-historic stone tools.

He led the excavation in Wiltshire that unearthed the Bulford solar alignment. Harding described the discovery as "probably one of the greatest finds of my career".

==== Television ====
In 1991, Harding took part in the series Time Signs, which was produced by Tim Taylor, who went on to create Channel 4's popular archaeology series Time Team. Harding was a regular on Time Team from the first series in 1994 until its cancellation in 2013. He also took part in the various spin-off series such as Time Team Extra (1998), Time Team Digs (2002) and Time Team Live. In addition, he has appeared in episodes of Meet the Ancestors (2003) and Chris Moyles' Quiz Night (2009).

He appeared in an episode of BBC's Digging for Britain in December 2016.

== Honours ==
On 2 May 1985, he became a member of the Chartered Institute for Archaeologists (MCIfA). Since 2004, he has been president of the Nautical Archaeology Society. On 4 April 2006, he was elected a Fellow of the Society of Antiquaries of London (FSA).

On 24 July 2008, he was awarded a Doctor of the University (DUniv) honorary degree by the University of Southampton.

In 2012, he was awarded the Henry Stopes Memorial Medal by the Geologists' Association: the medal is awarded once in every three years for work on the "Prehistory of Man".

On 5 March 2013, he was named Archaeologist of the Year by Current Archaeology.

On 15 September 2016, he was appointed Deputy Lieutenant (DL) to the Lord Lieutenant of Wiltshire.
