= Robin Bush =

British historian (1943–2010)

- Born: Robin James Edwin Bush; 12 March 1943
- Died: 22 June 2010 (aged 67)
- Occupation: Historian

Robin James Edwin Bush (12 March 1943 – 22 June 2010) was the resident historian for the first nine series of Channel 4's archaeology series Time Team, appearing in 39 episodes between 1994 and 2003. He also presented eight episodes of Time Team Extra in 1998.

For twelve years Bush was a Liberal Democrat member of Somerset County Council and served as chairman of the council from 2001 until 2005. He also held other positions in public life.

== Early life ==
Bush was born in Hayes, Middlesex. His father was originally a schoolmaster and then a training college lecturer in Mathematics. Bush attended the private Exeter School in Devon between 1950 and 1962, and it was here aged 13 that he first became interested in historical research while studying the school's history. His first two research papers were published by the Devonshire Association before he left school. He won a Trevelyan Scholarship, followed by a Stapledon Exhibition and later still a State Scholarship, to read History at Exeter College, Oxford (1962–65), taking his BA in Modern History in 1965 and an MA in 1984. Among his contemporaries at Oxford were the poet Craig Raine, the journalist Tariq Ali, the Marquess of Hartington and the psephologist Professor Ivor Crewe. A keen amateur actor, he also appeared on stage at the Oxford Playhouse with Monty Python actor Terry Jones.

== Archivist and historian ==
In 1965 he was appointed assistant archivist at Surrey Record Office at Kingston upon Thames before moving to Somerset Record Office in 1967 where he spent the rest of his working life. From 1970 to 1978 Bush was assistant editor of the Somerset Victoria County History, writing much of the content of three of its volumes. Later he returned to the Record Office as Deputy County Archivist until taking early retirement in 1993.

Bush wrote his first book in 1977, and produced volumes on the history of Taunton, Exmouth and Wellington, followed by a series of books on the county of Somerset. He researched emigration from the South West of England to New England between 1620 and 1645, which led to the publication of three further books in Ohio. Bush made six speaking tours to the United States, during one of which he met President George H. W. Bush at the White House. In 1987 he explained Somerset's archives to HM the Queen and the Duke of Edinburgh. From 1984 to 1996 he had a weekly spot on BBC Radio Bristol and then BBC Somerset, on which he told stories of local history and folklore.

== Television appearances ==
Bush became involved with the Time Team programmes through his long friendship with Mick Aston when Aston was Somerset's first county field archaeologist. Aston had previously discussed the idea of devising an archaeological television programme with Tony Robinson, and a pilot episode was set up. Through helping to devise the programme's format with producer Tim Taylor, Bush was invited to take part in the pilot which was shot at Dorchester-on-Thames in October 1992. Although the pilot programme was never screened, the idea was good enough to persuade Channel 4 to commission a four programme series of Time Team, which was filmed in 1993 and broadcast the following year.

Bush also appeared in Channel 4's series Joe Public, for which he researched the loss of a hat jewel by Henry VIII. Bush appeared regularly as resident historian on Revealing Secrets (55 episodes) for Multi Media, transmitted on Channel 4 on weekdays from 26 March to 4 July 2001.

As a solo presenter Bush filmed a series of six half-hour programmes entitled The West at War, broadcast in 2005, which examined the impact of war on the South West of England from Roman times to the present day for ITV Westcountry.

== Personal life ==
Bush lived in Taunton with his wife, Hilary Margaret Marshall, whom he married in 1993. By an earlier marriage to the late Iris Maude Reed he had two children and two grandchildren. He was Chairman of the Somerset Archaeological and Natural History Society (1983–84), then President of Taunton Amateur Operatic Society (TAOS), 1985–2009. He performed regularly in amateur dramas, musicals and grand opera productions throughout West Somerset, and in 1991, 1994 and 1997 he helped to judge the grand finals of the World Public Speaking and Debating Championships.

== Political life ==
From May 1997 until June 2009 Bush served as a Liberal Democrat member of Somerset County Council, serving as chairman of the council from 2001 until 2005. He was also vice chairman of the county's Information and Leisure Board (1998–2000) and vice chairman of the Community, Leisure and Information Review Committee (2000–2001), chairman of the Regulation (Planning) Committee (2005–07) and chairman of both the Somerset Cultural Forum and Somerset Cultural Executive (2003–09). Bush was vice chairman of the South West Museums Council (1998–2000) and served as a board member of Culture South West, Arts Council England South West and the South West Museums, Libraries and Archives Council.

He was a member of the council and court of the University of Bristol and of the courts of the University of Bath and the University of Exeter. He was one of four patrons of Wessex Actors Company, with the Marquess of Bath, Lord Tom King and the late Ned Sherrin, 2002 to 2010. Bush was also patron of Apple AM – Taunton Hospital Radio, which served the patients of Musgrove Park Hospital, Taunton, and has now been superseded by its evolutionary descendant, Apple FM, Taunton's Community Radio Station He was president of the Somerset Art Gallery Trust and the Somerset Youth Partnership, and vice president and trustee of the Somerset Community Foundation.

== Death ==
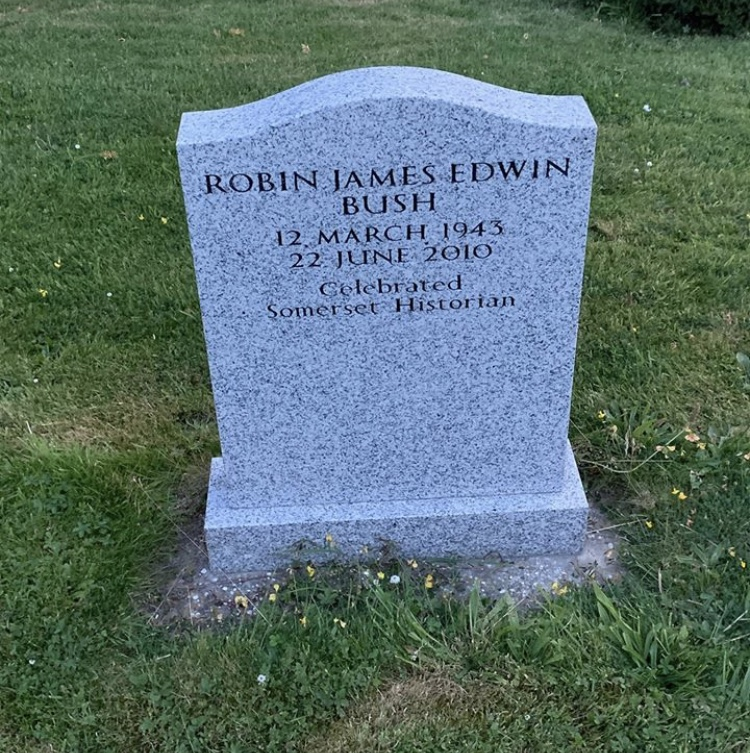
The grave of Robin Bush in the churchyard of St Nicholas's Church in Corfe in Somerset

Robin Bush died on 22 June 2010, aged 67, after a long period of illness. He is buried in the churchyard of St Nicholas's Church in Corfe, Somerset.

== Works ==
=== Books and monographs ===
- Victoria County History of Somerset:
  - (with R.W. Dunning) vol iii (Oxford University Press, 1974) ISBN 0-19-722739-2
  - (with R.W. Dunning) vol iv (OUP, 1976) ISBN 0-19-722747-3
  - (with R.W. Dunning and Mary Siraut) vol v (OUP, 1983) ISBN 0-19-722764-3
- The Book of Taunton (Barracuda Books, 1977) ISBN 0-86023-034-1
- The Book of Exmouth (Barracuda Books, 1978) ISBN 0-86023-057-0
- The Book of Wellington (with Gillian Allen, Barracuda Books, 1983) ISBN 0-86023-099-6
- Jeboult's Taunton (Barracuda Books, 1983) ISBN 0-86023-186-0
- The Archaeology of Taunton ed. Peter Leach, four principal chapters by Robin Bush (Western Archaeological Trust, Excavation Monograph no.8, 1984), pp. 11–16, 59–63, 75–79, 104–106.
- The Story of the County Hotel, Taunton (1987)
- Shields and Wall Plate Carving in the Church of St Mary, Ashill (1987)
- A Taunton Diary, 1787–1987 (Barracuda Books, 1988) ISBN 0-86023-422-3
- The Story of Taunton Castle (Somerset Archaeological Society, 1988)
- Somerset, a Portrait in Colour (Dovecote Press, 1989) ISBN 0-946159-70-X
- Somerset Stories (Dovecote Press, 1990) ISBN 0-946159-84-X
- Your Somerset Family (Somerset County Council. 1992)
- Somerset, the Complete Guide (Dovecote Press, 1994) ISBN 1-874336-27-X
- Somerset Villages (Dovecote Press, 1995) ISBN 1-874336-35-0
- Search for the Passengers of the Mary and John, 1630, ed. Burton Spear:

- vol 25 New Ancestral Discoveries – part 1 (Ohio, 1996)
- vol 26 New Ancestral Discoveries – part 2 (Ohio, 1997)
- vol 27 New Ancestral Discoveries – part 3 (Ohio, 1999)

- Somerset Bedside Book (Dovecote Press, 1997) ISBN 1-874336-43-1
- Chapter on 'The Age of Elegance' in Somerset: the Millennium Book, ed. Tom Mayberry and Hilary Binding (Somerset Books, 1999) ISBN 0-86183-485-2
- Aesop's Fables, A Choral Cycle, verse libretto by Robin Bush, composer Douglas Coombes (Lindsay Music, 2001).

=== Papers in journals ===
- 'The Rev John Lempriere, DD, in Devon' in Transactions of the Devonshire Association, xciii (1961), pp. 228–249.
- 'Exeter Free Grammar School, 1633–1809' in Trans. of Devonsh. Assoc. xciv (1962), pp. 363–410.
- 'Exeter during the Civil War and Interregnum' in Devon & Cornwall Notes & Queries, xxix (1962–3) pp. 80–87, 102–09, 132–39, 171–76.
- 'George Passemer, a Devonshire Antiquary' in Devon & Cornwall N. & Q. xxix (1964), pp. 241ff.
- 'Nettlecombe Court. 1. The Trevelyans and other residents' in Field Studies Journal, iii/2 (1970), pp. 275–87.
- 'The Tudor Tavern, Fore Street, Taunton' in Proceedings of the Somerset Archaeological and Natural History Society, cxix (1976), pp. 15–20.
- 'West Newton Manor Farm' [in North Petherton] in Proc. Som. Arch. Nat. Hist. Soc. cxxiii (1980), pp. 55–64.
- 'Somerset, England, Records and American Descendants' in Connecticut Nutmegger, vol 19 (1986), pp. 386–396.
- 'The Blake Ancestry of Elizabeth Saunders, wife of Henry Wolcott,' in Connecticut Nutmegger, vol 22 (1989), pp. 11–12.

=== Recordings ===
- Four audiocassettes of lectures to the 'All American Conference' of the (USA) Federation of Genealogical Societies delivered at Fort Wayne, Indiana, published in the US by audiotapes.com (1991).
- An Archivist Abroad (FW-52).
- An Archivist's Casebook – The Pleasures and Pitfalls of English Genealogy (FW-93).
- Brought to Book – English Quarter Sessions and their Records (FW-232).
- Courts and Copyhold – the English Manor and its Records (FW-34)

Double audiocassettes of Robin Bush retelling Tales of Old Somerset (1995), Halsgrove Productions, Tiverton, Devon.

Compact Disc of Aesop's Fables, a Choral Cycle, verse libretto by Robin Bush, composer Douglas Coombes' (Lindsay Music, 2001).
