= Time Team =

British archaeology television show

- Original Time Team logo
- Genre: Documentary
- Created by: Tim Taylor
- Presented by: Tony Robinson; Mary-Ann Ochota; Gus Casely-Hayford; Natalie Haynes; Helen Geake; Derek Pitman; Martyn Williams
- Starring: Mick Aston; Phil Harding; Carenza Lewis; Robin Bush; Stewart Ainsworth; John Gater; Chris Gaffney; Victor Ambrus; Helen Geake; Raksha Dave; Matt Williams; Mark Horton; Tracey Smith; Brigid Gallagher; Jackie McKinley; Derek Pitman; Giselle Király; Lawrence Shaw; and others
- Theme music composer: Paul Greedus
- Composer: Steve Day
- Country of origin: United Kingdom
- Original language: English
- No. of series: 25
- No. of episodes: 292 (list of episodes)

Production
- Executive producers: Tim Taylor; Philip Clarke; Emily Boulting; Jim Mason; David Brady; Richard Belfield; Mike Welsh; Alison Turner
- Camera setup: Multi-camera
- Running time: approx. 45 minutes
- Production companies: VideoText Communications Ltd (Channel 4); Time Team Digital Ltd (YouTube)

Original release
- Network: Channel 4
- Release: 16 January 1994 – 7 September 2014
- Network: YouTube
- Release: 2 April 2011 – present

Related
- Time Signs; Time Team Extra; History Hunters; Time Team Digs; Time Team America

Time Team

YouTube information
- Channels: Time Team Official; Time Team Classics
- Subscribers: 371 thousand (official); 329 thousand (classics)
- Views: 50,625,452 (official); 121,332,719 (classics)
- Last updated: 11 August 2026

Time Team Podcast
- Genre: Popular science, archaeology
- Language: English

Cast and voices
- Hosted by: Helen Geake; Martyn Williams

Production
- Production: Time Team Digital
- Length: approx. 40 minutes

Publication
- No. of seasons: 3
- No. of episodes: 112 (list of episodes)
- Original release: 3 August 2024 – present
- Updates: Weekly (Tuesday)

Related
- Website: Time Team Podcast

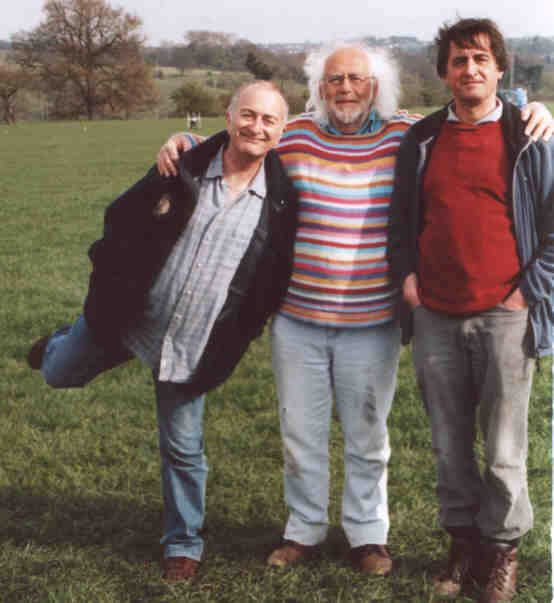
From left to right: Tony Robinson, Mick Aston, and Guy de la Bédoyère in 2007

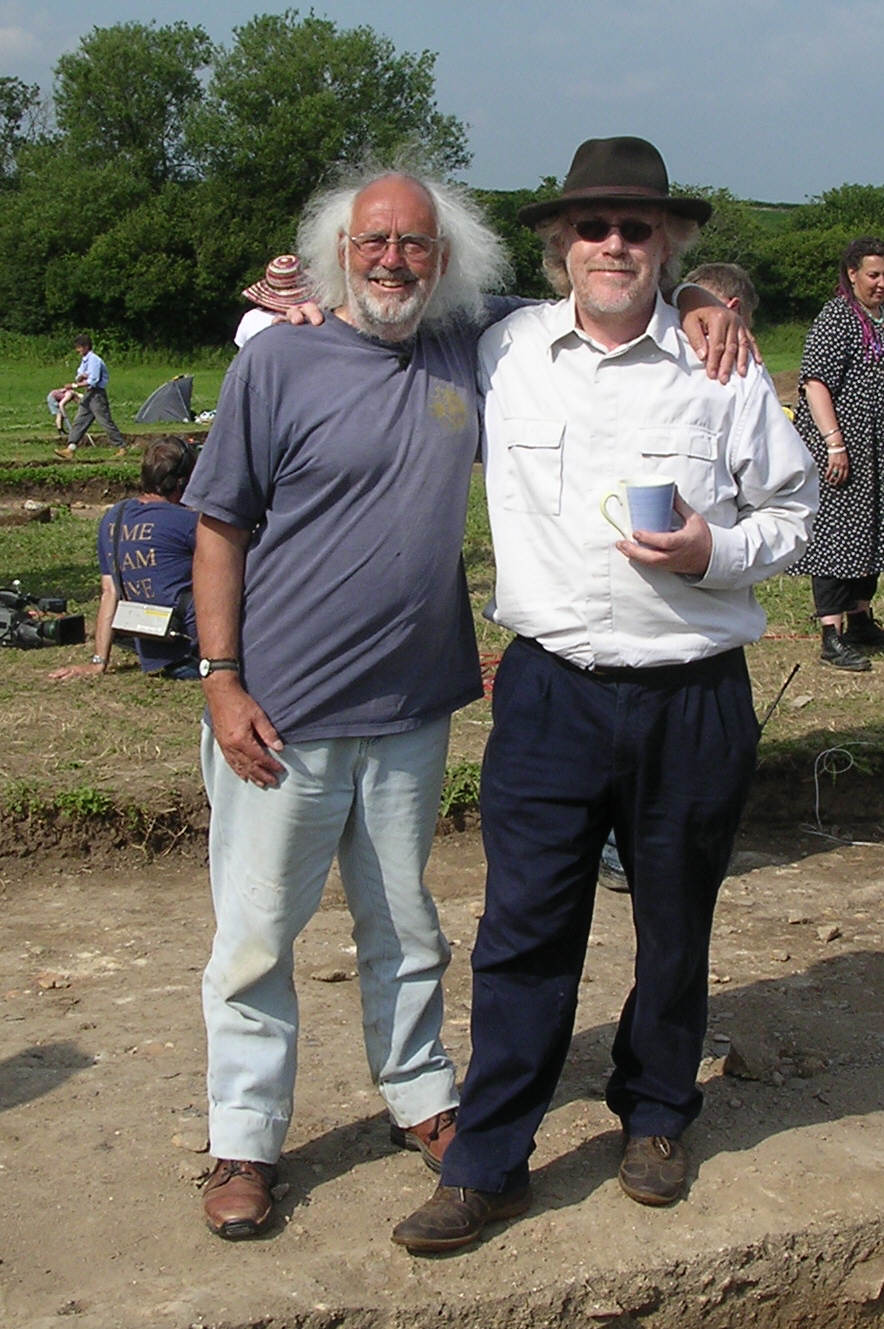
Aston with producer Tim Taylor in 2005

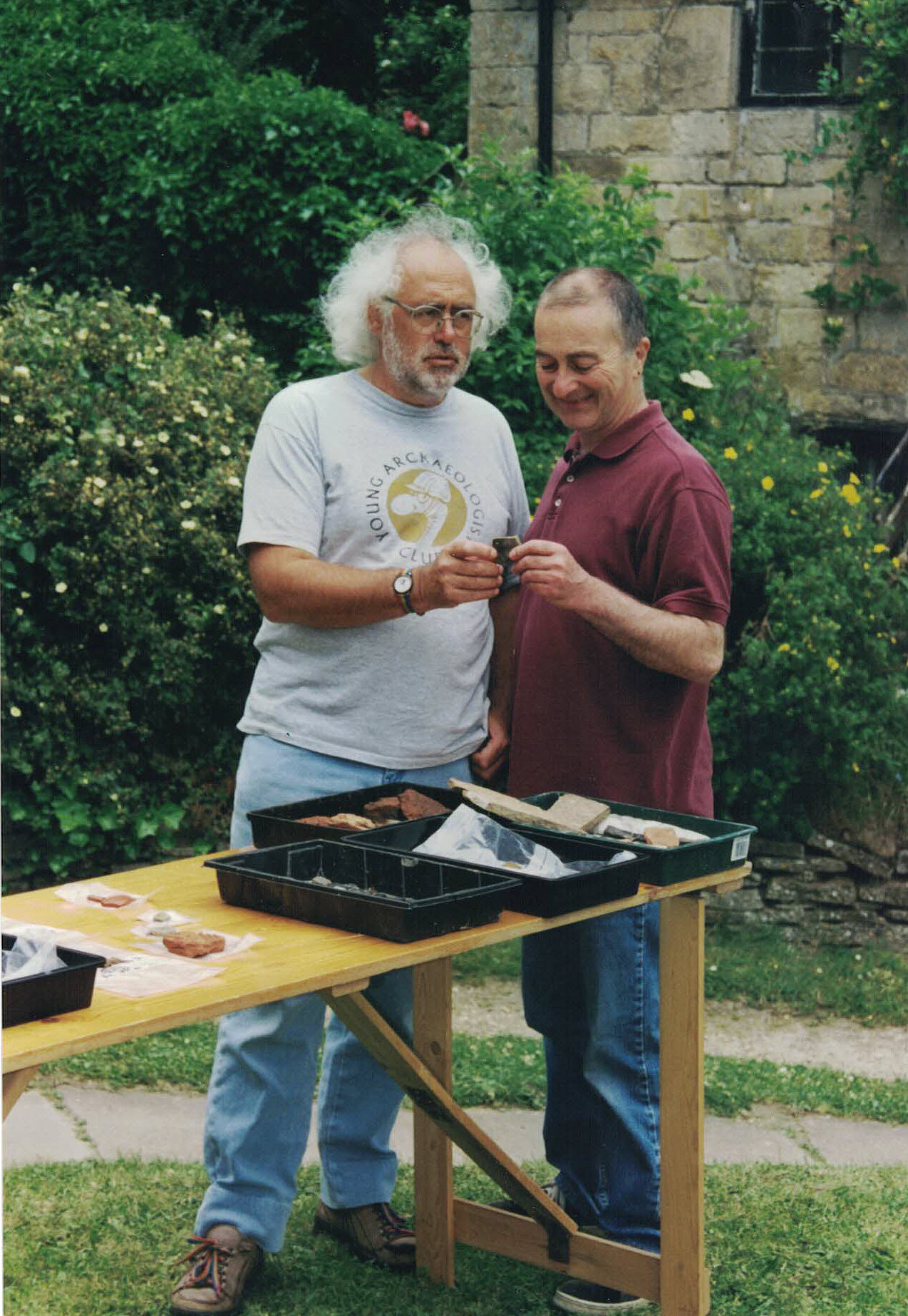
Aston and Robinson, Time Team Series 8 shoot at Waltham Fields, Whittington, Gloucestershire, England, 2000, transmitted 2001

Time Team is a British television programme that originally aired on Channel 4 from 16 January 1994 to 7 September 2014. It returned in 2022 on online platforms YouTube and Patreon. Created by television producer Tim Taylor and presented by actor Tony Robinson, each episode features a team of specialists carrying out an archaeological dig over a period of three days, with Robinson explaining the process in lay terms. The specialists changed throughout the programme's run, although it consistently included professional archaeologists such as Mick Aston, Carenza Lewis, Francis Pryor and Phil Harding. The sites excavated ranged in date from the Palaeolithic to the Second World War.

In October 2012, Channel 4 announced that the final series would be broadcast in 2013. Series 20 was screened from January–March 2013 and nine specials were screened between May 2013 and September 2014. In May 2021, Taylor announced the return of the series, with free episodes to be shown on YouTube. The first episodes of the revival began appearing on YouTube in 2022.

== Series overview ==
Series	Episodes	Originally released		
Series	Episodes	First released	Last released	Network
1	4	16 January 1994	6 February 1994	Channel 4
2	5	8 January 1995	5 February 1995	Channel 4
3	6	7 January 1996	11 February 1996	Channel 4
4	6	5 January 1997	9 February 1997	Channel 4
5	8	4 January 1998	1 March 1998	Channel 4
6	13	3 January 1999	28 March 1999	Channel 4
7	13	2 January 2000	26 March 2000	Channel 4
8	13	7 January 2001	1 April 2001	Channel 4
9	13	6 January 2002	31 March 2002	Channel 4
10	14	5 January 2003	30 March 2003	Channel 4
11	13	4 January 2004	28 March 2004	Channel 4
12	21	2 January 2005	3 April 2005	Channel 4
13	13	22 January 2006	16 April 2006	Channel 4
14	14	14 January 2007	8 April 2007	Channel 4
15	13	6 January 2008	30 March 2008	Channel 4
16	13	4 January 2009	29 March 2009	Channel 4
17	12	18 April 2010	14 November 2010	Channel 4
18	11	6 February 2011	17 April 2011	Channel 4
19	13	22 January 2012	13 May 2012	Channel 4
20	13	11 November 2012	24 March 2013	Channel 4
21	4	20 March 2022	2 July 2023	YouTube & Patreon
22	3	26 March 2023	2023	YouTube & Patreon
23	2	7 April 2024	20 May 2024	YouTube & Patreon
24	TBC	2025	2025	YouTube & Patreon
25	TBC	2026	2026	YouTube & Patreon

== Team members ==
A team of archaeologists, usually led by Mick Aston or Francis Pryor (the latter usually heading Bronze Age and Iron Age digs), and including field archaeologist Phil Harding, congregate at a site, usually in Britain. The original Time Team line-up from 1994 changed over the years. Historian and archivist Robin Bush was a regular in the first nine series, having been involved with the programme through his long friendship with Aston. Architectural historian Beric Morley featured in ten episodes between 1995 and 2002. In 2005, Carenza Lewis left to pursue other interests and was replaced by Helen Geake, an Anglo-Saxon specialist. The regular team also included Stewart Ainsworth, landscape investigator; John Gater and Chris Gaffney, archaeological geophysicists; Henry Chapman, surveyor; and Victor Ambrus, illustrator.

The team was supplemented by experts appropriate for the period and type of site. Guy de la Bédoyère has often been present for Roman digs, as well as those involving the Second World War (such as D-Day), and aircraft (such as the Spitfire). Architectural historian Jonathan Foyle has appeared in episodes relating to excavations of country estates. Paul Blinkhorn (pottery), Mark Corney (coins), Carl Thorpe (pottery), and Jackie McKinley (bones) have appeared from time to time. Mick 'the dig' Worthington, an excavator in the early series, occasionally returned as a dendrochronologist, whereupon he was dubbed 'Mick the twig'. Osteoarcheologist Margaret Cox often assisted with forensic archaeology, mainly between 1998 and 2005. Other specialists who appeared from time to time include historian Bettany Hughes, archaeologist Gustav Milne, East of England specialist Ben Robinson, architectural historian Richard K. Morriss, and David S. Neal, expert on Roman mosaics. Local historians also joined in.

In February 2012, it was announced that Aston had left the show because of format changes. The disputed changes included hiring anthropologist Mary-Ann Ochota as a co-presenter, dispensing with other archaeologists and what he thought were plans to "cut down the informative stuff about the archaeology". "The time had come to leave. I never made any money out of it, but a lot of my soul went into it. I feel really, really angry about it," he told British Archaeology magazine. Time Team producer Tim Taylor released a statement in response to the news reports saying "His concerns are of great importance to me. We have addressed some of them" and that "you've not heard the last of Mick on Time Team".

Regular team members in later years included archaeologist Neil Holbrook, Roman coins specialist Philippa Walton, and historian Sam Newton. Younger members of Time Team who made regular appearances include Jenni Butterworth, Raksha Dave, Kerry Ely, Brigid Gallagher, Rob Hedge, Katie Hirst, Alex Langlands, Cassie Newland, Ian Powlesland, Alice Roberts, Faye Simpson, Barney Sloane, Tracey Smith, and Matt Williams.

=== Time Team members ===
Name	Occupation	Role
Tim Taylor	Creator	Executive Producer
Sir Tony Robinson	Actor & Presenter	Presenter
Jimmy Adcock	Geophysicist	Geophysicist
Mick Aston	Archaeologist	Site Supervisor
Phil Harding	Archaeologist	Field Archaeologist
Carenza Lewis	Archaeologist	Strategist
Robin Bush	Historian	Historical Specialist
Stewart Ainsworth	Archaeologist	Landscape Archaeologist
John Gater	Geophysicist	Archaeological Geophysics
Chris Gaffney	Archaeologist	Archaeologist
Helen Geake	Archaeologist	Presenter, Small Finds
Victor Ambrus	Illustrator	Archaeological Illustrator
Neil Max Emmanuel	Illustrator	Historical Illustrator 2D Motion GFX Art Director
Raksha Dave	Archaeologist	Field Archaeologist
Matt Williams	Archaeologist	Field Archaeologist
Mark Horton	Archaeologist	Field Archaeologist
Tracey Smith	Archaeologist	Field Archaeologist
Brigid Gallagher	Archaeologist	Field Archaeologist
Jackie McKinley	Osteoarchaeologist	Bones Specialist
Miles Russell	Archaeologist	Presenter, Archaeologist
Derek Pitman	Archaeologist	Presenter, Archaeologist
Lawrence Shaw	Archaeologist	Field Archaeologist
Francis Pryor	Archaeologist	Site Supervisor
Beric Morley	Architectural Historian	Architecture Specialist
Henry Chapman	Surveyor	Survey Specialist
Guy de la Bédoyère	Romanist	Roman Specialist
Jonathan Foyle	Architectural Historian	Architecture Specialist
Paul Blinkhorn	Archaeologist	Pottery Specialist
Mark Corney	Numismatist	Coin Specialist
Carl Thorpe		Pottery Specialist
Mick Worthington	Dendrochronologist	Wood Dating Specialist
Margaret Cox	Osteoarcheologist	Forensic Archaeology Specialist
Bettany Hughes	Historian	Historical Specialist
Gustav Milne	Archaeologist	Archaeologist
Ben Robinson	Archaeologist	East of England Specialist
Richard K. Morriss	Architectural Historian	Architecture Specialist
David S. Neal	Romanist	Roman Mosaic Specialist
Mary-Ann Ochota	Presenter	Presenter
Neil Holbrook	Archaeologist	Site Supervisor
Philippa Walton	Archaeologist	Coins and Small Finds Specialist
Sam Newton	Historian	Historical Specialist
Jenni Butterworth	Archaeologist	Archaeologist
Kerry Ely	Archaeologist	Archaeologist
Rob Hedge	Archaeologist	Archaeologist
Katie Hirst	Archaeologist	Archaeologist
Alex Langlands	Archaeologist	Landscape Archaeologist
Cassie Newland	Archaeologist	Archaeologist
Ian Powlesland	Archaeologist	Archaeologist
Alice Roberts	Doctor	Bone Specialist
Faye Simpson	Archaeologist	Archaeologist
Barney Sloane		
Martyn Williams	Broadcaster	Podcast Presenter
Keith Wescott	Metal Detectorist	Metal Detector Specialist
Dani Wootton	Archaeologist	Presenter, Finds Specialist
Giselle Király	Archaeologist	Field Archaeologist and Osteoarchaeologist, occasional presenter
Richard Parker	Archaeologist	Buildings Archaeologist
Meg Russell	Archaeologist	Field Archaeologist
Raysan al-Kubaisi	Designer and Architect	Graphics Specialist
Gus Casely-Hayford	Cultural Historian	Presenter
Naomi Sewpaul	Archaeologist	Environmental Archaeologist, Float Tank Specialist
Richard Osgood	Archaeologist	War Specialist
Hilde Van der Heul	Archaeologist	Field Archaeologist
Matt 'Bear' Clark	3D media artist	Recreations, 3D Illustrator, Graphics Specialist

== Production ==
Time Team developed from an earlier Channel 4 programme, Time Signs, first broadcast in 1991. Produced by Taylor, Time Signs had featured Aston and Harding, who went on to appear on Time Team. Following Time Signs' cancellation, Taylor went on to develop a more attractive format, producing the idea for Time Team, which Channel 4 also picked up, broadcasting the first series in 1994. Time Team has had many companion shows during its run, including Time Team Extra (1998), History Hunters (1998–1999) and Time Team Digs (2002), whilst several spin-off books have been published. The programme features special episodes, often documentaries on history or archaeology and live episodes. The programme has been exported to 35 other countries. (Note: Time Team was made in partnership between VideoText Communications Ltd and Picturehouse Television Co. Ltd (based in London). Recently formed Wildfire Television was involved in the production of The Big Roman Dig (2005) and The Big Royal Dig (2006). It was produced by Taylor, the show's originator, with Robinson as associate producer.) Time Team America, a US version of the programme, was broadcast on PBS in 2009. (Note: Time Team America was co-produced by Oregon Public Broadcasting and Videotext/C4i.)

On 13 September 2007, during the filming of a jousting reenactment for a special episode of Time Team, a splinter from a balsa wood lance went through the eye-slit in the helmet of one of the participants and entered his eye socket. 54 year-old Paul Anthony Allen, a member of a re-enactment society, died a week later in hospital. Channel 4 stated that the programme would be shown, but without the re-enactment sequence. The episode, dedicated to Allen, was transmitted on 25 February 2008.

=== Cancellation ===
In 2012, Aston announced he was leaving the show after criticising format changes that focused less on archaeological activities. Channel 4 subsequently announced that the final Time Team series would be broadcast in 2013. Viewing figures had been in decline from 2.5 million in 2008 to 1.5 million in November 2011. The regular Time Team programme ended on 24 March 2013. Aston died unexpectedly on 24 June 2013.

In October 2013, Robinson said in an interview with Radio Times that he believed Time Team still had life in it and suggested that after a three- or four-year absence it could make a return. He also expressed support for a fan-organised Facebook campaign to bring the Time Team crew together again to carry out a dig in memory of Aston. The final Time Team special aired on 7 September 2014.

=== Revival ===
In December 2020, producer Tim Taylor announced that Time Team would begin airing episodes on a YouTube channel called "Time Team Classics". Taylor also announced the launch of the Time Team Patreon page, allowing fans to financially support efforts to revive the series. On 29 January 2021, the project exceeded its goal of 3,000 patrons.

On 17 May 2021, Taylor made an announcement on the return of the series, with episodes planned to air for free on the YouTube channel. Confirmed team members included Carenza Lewis, John Gater, Helen Geake, Stewart Ainsworth, Raysan Al-Kubaisi, Neil Emmanuel, Naomi Sewpaul, Matt Williams, Henry Chapman, Dani Wootton, Brigid Gallagher, Neil Holbrook, Suzannah Lipscomb, Jimmy Adcock, Natalie Haynes, Derek Pitman, Lawrence Shaw, Hilde van der Heul, Pete Spencer, and several returning production team members.

In September 2021, it was announced that Gus Casely-Hayford and Natalie Haynes would present the revived series.

Series 21 featured two three-part episodes, each covering a new dig conducted in 2021. The first of these episodes, which premiered between 18 and 20 March 2022, covered the excavation of an Iron Age settlement on the Lizard Peninsula in Cornwall. The second episode premiered between 8 and 10 April 2022 and featured the excavation of a Roman villa in the grounds of Broughton Castle in Oxfordshire, discovered by metal detectorist and amateur archaeologist Keith Westcott in 2016.

Time Team returned to Broughton Castle to answer questions related to a mysterious stone sarcophagus. The first of this two-part episode premiered on 22 December 2022.

Further episodes were released in 2023 and 2024:

- 24 March 2023 – Halston Hall, Shropshire – three parts
- 1 April 2023 – Central Greece – two parts
- 10 June 2023 – Shipwreck off the Isle of Purbeck, Dorset – one part
- 30 June 2023 – Diss, Norfolk – three parts
- 5 April 2024 – Modbury, Devon – three parts

On 8 March 2024, the Time Team YouTube channel announced plans to dig Sutton Hoo, near Woodbridge, Suffolk, in June 2024. A 3 part feature-length documentary of the dig presented by Tony Robinson was released in 2025.

=== Music ===
The series' original theme music was composed by Paul Greedus. The majority of the incidental tracks and main themes for the show, and for many of the specials ("Dinosaur Hunting in Montana", "D-Day", "The Big Dig", etc.) were composed by Steve Day.

=== Format ===
At the start of the programme, Tony Robinson explains, in an opening "piece to camera", the reasons for the team's visit to the site. During the dig, he enthusiastically encourages the archaeologists to explain their decisions, discoveries and conclusions, while trying to ensure that everything is comprehensible to the archaeologically uninitiated. The site is frequently suggested by a member of the viewing public. Time Team uncover as much as they can of the archaeology and history of the site in three days.

Excavations are not just carried out to entertain viewers. Robinson claims that the archaeologists involved with Time Team have published more scientific papers on excavations carried out in the programme than all British university archaeology departments over the same period, and that by 2013, the programme had become the biggest funder of field archaeology in the country.

=== Other formats ===
Time Team's Big Dig was an expansion on the live format. A weekend of live broadcasts in June 2003 was preceded by a week of daily short programmes. It involved about a thousand members of the public in excavating test pits each one metre square by fifty centimetres deep. Most of these pits were in private gardens and the project stirred up controversies about approaches to public archaeology.

Time Team's Big Roman Dig (2005) saw this format altered, in an attempt to avoid previous controversies, through the coverage of nine archaeological sites around the UK which were already under investigation by professional archaeologists. Time Team covered the action through live link-ups based at a Roman Villa at Dinnington in Somerset – itself a Time Team excavation from 2003. Over 60 other professionally supervised excavations were supported by Time Team and carried out around the country in association with the programme. A further hundred activities relating to Roman history were carried out by schools and other institutions around the UK.

Time Team Specials are documentary programmes about topics in history and archaeology made by the same production company. They are generally presented by Robinson and often feature one or more of the familiar faces from the regular programme of Time Team. In some cases the programme makers have followed the process of discovery at a large commercial or research excavation by another body, such as that to commemorate the 90th anniversary of the ending of the First World War at the Vampire dugout in Belgium. Time Team usually does not carry out excavations for these programmes, but may contribute a reconstruction.

Time Team History of Britain saw Robinson and the team document everything they have learned up to now and show a history of Britain. Behind the Scenes of Time Team showed meetings of the archaeologists, and material not transmitted during the episode of the dig. 10 Years of Time Team presented a round-up of what has happened in Time Team over the past 10 years and what they expect to happen in the future.

The Time Team website (editor Steve Platt) won a BAFTA for interactive entertainment (factual) in 2002.

== Time Team Podcast ==
In 2024, Time Team's Dr Helen Geake and Martyn Williams began the podcast. This weekly podcast delves into the world of archaeology, offering exclusive access to digs and interviews with experts to uncover the stories of the past. The podcast is an accompanying format to the YouTube version of Time Team.

=== Podcast series overview ===
Series	Episodes		Originally released	
Series	Episodes		First released	Last released
1	9		3 September 2024	24 December 2024
2	47		7 January 2025	30 December 2025
3	55	7	January 6, 2026	February 17, 2026
3	55	Bonus 1	February 17, 2025	
3	55	4	February 24, 2026	March 17, 2026
3	55	Bonus 2	February 17, 2026	
3	55	2	March 24, 2026	March 31, 2016
3	55	Bonus 3	March 31, 2026	
3	55	4	April 7, 2026	April 28, 2026
3	55	Bonus 4	April 28, 2026	
3	55	4	May 5, 2026	May 26, 2026
3	55	Bonus 5	May 26, 2026	
3	55	4	June 2, 2026	June 23, 2026
3	55	Bonus 6	June 23, 2026	
3	55	1	June 30, 2026	June 30, 2026
3	55	Bonus 7	June 30, 2026	
3	55	11	July 7, 2026	September 15, 2026
3	55	Bonus 8	September 15, 2026	
3	55	4	September 22, 2026	October 13, 2026
3	55	Bonus 9	October 13, 2026	
3	55	5	October 20, 2026	November 17, 2026

== Influence ==
Time Team has been credited with promoting archaeology in the UK. In a 2008 report produced by English Heritage, a working group of Palaeolithic specialists recognised the importance of the show in "promoting public awareness" of Palaeolithic Britain, something which they argued was to be encouraged.

== DVD releases ==
Complete series have been released in Australia starting with Series 15 in 2010. Since then, Series 12 (2014), Series 14 (2012), Series 16 (2010), Series 17 (2011), Series 18 (2012), Series 19 (2012) and Series 20 (2013) have all been released in Australia. 'Best Of' DVDs were released in the UK over the years; however, a complete series had never been released until Series 18 was released by Acorn Media UK on 6 February 2012. On 15 May 2012, Acorn Media released a collection of Roman-themed episodes on Region One DVD.
