= Time Team series 18 =

Time Team
- Season 18

Release
- Original network: Channel 4
- Original release: 6 February – 10 April 2011

Series chronology
- ← Previous; Series 17 Next → Series 19

This is a list of Time Team episodes from series 18. The series was released on DVD (region 2) in 2012 as "Tottiford and Other Digs".

== Episode ==
=== Series 18 ===
Episode # refers to the air date order. The Time Team Specials are aired in between regular episodes, but are omitted from this list. Regular contributors on Time Team include: Tony Robinson (presenter); archaeologists Mick Aston, Phil Harding, Helen Geake, Neil Holbrook, Raksha Dave; Victor Ambrus (illustrator); Stewart Ainsworth (landscape investigator); John Gater (geophysicist); Henry Chapman (surveyor); Paul Blinkhorn (pottery expert).

No. overall	No. in season	Title	Location	Coordinates	Original release date
225	1	"Reservoir Rituals"	Tottiford Reservoir, Devon	50°38′9.6″N 3°40′58.8″W	6 February 2011
The first stone henge to be discovered in Britain for a century would be cause enough for major celebration. But there's double bubbles as Tony Robinson and his hardy team of archaeologists celebrate their 200th dig. Jane Marchand from Dartmoor National Park Authority was alerted by a walker to standing stones peering out of an East Devon reservoir at low level. This is Francis Pryor's dream site, but Mick has also been interested in Dartmoor for some time. They have stone circles, stone rows and cairns apparently dating from 3000 to 1500 BC. There is a central mound which interests Francis, and which Phil thinks is Stone Age, thus pre-dating the other monuments. But the cairns may be recent, throwing into doubt the dating of the other features. This is cultivated farmland, atypical of Dartmoor's usual bleak landscapes. John is dubious about getting any meaningful geophysics results, but proposes nevertheless to wheel his trolley through the mud. Stewart and Henry create a 3D image of the prehistoric landscape. Phil teaches Matt his favourite activity, flint-knapping.
226	2	"Saxon Death, Saxon Gold"	West Langton, Leicestershire	52°31′33″N 0°56′24″W	13 February 2011
The Team are intrigued by metal detecting finds and pottery scattered across some fields in Leicestershire, which suggest they're on the site of a high-status Anglo-Saxon burial ground.
227	3	"Romans on the Range"	High Ham, Somerset	51°3′42″N 2°49′35″W	20 February 2011
Tony and the Team get a unique opportunity to dig at an army firing range at High Ham in Somerset and investigate a series of mosaics first discovered 150 years ago. Everything indicates a Roman villa, though perhaps not on such a grand scale. The inhabitants may have been Romanised Britons, living from the 2nd to the early 5th century. Matt volunteers as a slave for the day. When the cold east wind sets in, Phil and the other diggers temporarily "down tools". They are joined by Martin Brown from the Defence Estates and Roman finds specialist Philippa Walton.
228	4	"Hitler's Island Fortress"	Les Gellettes, Jersey	49°12′35″N 2°9′36″W	27 February 2011
Tony Robinson doesn't usually get to decide where the Team should dig, but in this episode he chooses his first ever site for investigation: a German anti-aircraft battery on Jersey. The dig director was Dr. Ben Robinson.
229	5	"Furnace in the Forest"	Derwentcote, County Durham	54°54′14″N 1°47′50″W	6 March 2011
Dense and tranquil woodland in the County Durham countryside provides an unlikely venue for Time Team's investigation into the earliest days of the Industrial Revolution.
230	6	"Under the Gravestones"	Castor, Cambridgeshire	52°34′22″N 0°20′34″W	13 March 2011
The Team face one of their strangest challenges ever: digging through a church graveyard in search of what could be one of the largest Roman structures ever built in Britain.
232	7	"House of the White Queen"	Groby, Leicestershire	52°39′50″N 1°13′37″W	20 March 2011
Tony and the Team discover evidence of a dynasty that arrived with William the Conqueror and went on to produce two queens of England: Elizabeth Woodville (queen to Edward IV), and Lady Jane Grey.
233	8	"Cannons and Castles"	Mont Orgueil, Jersey	49°11′58″N 2°1′10″W	27 March 2011
Tony Robinson heads to Jersey to investigate the origins of Mont Orgueil Castle. Today's castle is a Tudor structure built on earlier foundations, and it's that early castle, built by King John, that the Team are looking for.
234	9	"Mystery of the Manor Moat"	Llancaiach Fawr, South Wales	51°39′41″N 3°16′53″W	3 April 2011
Investigating an archaeologist's dream. An ancient moat has been discovered and no one knows what it once protected. Was it an early Welsh chapel, a Roman fort, a fortified cattle enclosure, or even the ancestral home of one of Wales's most important families?
235	10	"Search for the Domesday Mill"	Buck Mill, Somerset	51°3′3″N 2°21′49″W	10 April 2011
Horse owner Stephanie Fry believes an 11th-century flour mill once stood on her land, near Stoke Trister in Somerset, and asks the Team to dig. There is reference to a mill in the parish in Domesday, and standing remains of a building depicted in a 1782 parish map. Multiple leat earthworks in the area indicate multiple mills over the centuries. The remains of the standing mill include parts of the last mill wheel, a 19th-century overshot wheel. This was the second mill Time Team dug; the first was in Season 14, and the episodes are listed in Wikipedia as having the same name.
237	11	"Rooting for the Romans"	Bedford Purlieus Wood, Cambridgeshire	52°35′13″N 00°27′35″W	17 April 2011
An eagle-eyed forest ranger spotted bits of Roman building poking out from the forest floor in Cambridgeshire's Bedford Purlieus Wood.
