= Time Team series 15 =

Time Team
- Season 15
- No. of episodes: 13

Release
- Original network: Channel 4
- Original release: 6 January – 30 March 2008

Series chronology
- ← Previous; Series 14 Next → Series 16

This is a list of Time Team episodes from series 15. The series was released on DVD (region 2) in 2013.

== Episode ==
=== Series 15 ===
Episode # refers to the air date order. The Time Team Specials are aired in between regular episodes, but are omitted from this list. Regular contributors on Time Team include: Tony Robinson (presenter); archaeologists Mick Aston, Phil Harding, Helen Geake, Neil Holbrook, Brigid Gallagher, Raksha Dave, Matt Williams, Faye Simpson, Ian Powlesland, Kerry Ely; historians Guy de la Bedoyere, Francis Pryor; Jackie McKinley (osteoarchaeologist); Victor Ambrus (illustrator); Stewart Ainsworth (landscape investigator); John Gater (geophysicist); Henry Chapman (surveyor); Mark Corney, Paul Blinkhorn (pottery experts); Raysan Al-Kubaisi (graphic designer).

No. overall	No. in season	Title	Location	Coordinates	Original release date
175	1	"Gold in the Moat"	Codnor Castle, Derbyshire	53.045125°N 1.354947°W	6 January 2008
In Derbyshire the Team investigate the medieval castle of Codnor, and find something very special. They are joined by Sarah Speight (castle specialist), Brian Kerr from English Heritage, and historian Richard K. Morriss.
176	2	"Street of the Dead"	Binchester, County Durham	54.676036°N 1.674253°W	13 January 2008
Time Team come to Binchester with a particular interest in uncovering a vicus, a civilian settlement supporting the Roman fort of Vinovia. Though part of the plot is a restricted scheduled monument, the vicus should be large enough for some of it to lie outside the scheduled area. John's spectacular geophysics indicates not only a possible Roman temple or mausoleum, but also a second, earlier fort. Together with cremation burials, it all forces the team to rethink their priorities.
178	3	"Bodies in the Dunes"	Allasdale, Barra, Western Isles	56.995162°N 7.509125°W	20 January 2008
In 2005, a major storm eroded a dune next to the beach at Allasdale, Barra, exposing cists and human remains. The Team goes on a rescue-dig, before the site is lost to erosion forever. The team are joined by archaeologists Mike Parker Pearson and Keith Branigan, and animal bones specialist Jackie Mulville. Jackie McKinley investigates some well-preserved human remains, and potter Ursina Hack-Maclellan throws some pots using an experimental prehistoric style clamp-kiln.
179	4	"The Naughty Nuns of Northampton"	Towcester, Northamptonshire	52.150658°N 0.952810°W	27 January 2008
When a family buried their cat "Paintpot" in their garden, they uncovered a massive stone wall. Time Team is called in to investigate. Sources suggest a 12th-century Cistercian nunnery once stood in the vicinity. They are joined by Glyn Coppack (monastic specialist), Iain Sowden (medieval specialist)
180	5	"Mysteries of the Mosaic"	Coberley, Gloucestershire	51.835399°N 2.049679°W	3 February 2008
Hundreds of Roman coins and bits of masonry have been found on a field near Coberly, but it's the discovery of a piece of Roman mosaic floor that has really got the archaeologists excited. They are joined by mosaics expert Anthony Beeson.
181	6	"Blitzkrieg on Shooter's Hill"	South London	51.470522°N 0.071049°E; 51.470403°N 0.055911°E; 51.473722°N 0.071168°E	10 February 2008
The team delve into the recent past to uncover the hidden archaeology behind the biggest battle that never was, the planned defence of Britain against a Nazi invasion in 1940
182	7	"Keeping up with the Georgians"	Hunstrete, Somerset	51.356569°N 2.509777°W	17 February 2008
The team descend on a field just outside Bath to investigate the remains of what could have been one of the country's grandest Georgian houses, built by Sir Francis Popham. They are joined by historians Elaine Chalus and Jonathan Foyle, and local archaeologist Marek Lewcun.
183	8	"Saxons on the Edge"	Stonton Wyville, Leicestershire	52.533367°N 0.908772°W	24 February 2008
The Team goes in search of a possible Anglo-Saxon settlement at Knave Hill in Leicestershire. Only eight such sites have been fully excavated in the whole of Britain. Can Time Team claim to have found the ninth? Tony is skeptical, but almost immediately Phil uncovers some exciting evidence. They are joined by medievalist Helena Hamerow and geneticist Bryan Sykes. Stewart investigates the surrounding locality with Anglo-Saxon historian Sam Newton. Phil's DNA is tested to find his ancestry.
185	9	"Fort of the Earls"	Dungannon, Northern Ireland	54.5058°N 6.7674°W	2 March 2008
The team visit Northern Ireland to locate one of the most important sites in Anglo-Irish history - a hilltop castle above the city of Dungannon, home of the powerful O'Neill dynasty, whose story culminates in the hugely significant flight of the Earls. The team are joined by Colm Donnelly, Hiram Morgan, Paul Logue and Jim O'Neill.
186	10	"From Constantinople to Cornwall"	Padstow, North Cornwall	50.556811°N 4.951477°W	9 March 2008
One summer during the 1980s, strange crop marks appeared in two fields on the north Cornish coast near Lellizzick. Locals have picked up a wealth of 1,500-year-old pottery and metalwork from as far away as North Africa and Turkey. Combined with some spectacular geophysics, it all suggested that this was once a busy international trading site. In Mick's opinion copper and tin would have been exchanged for foreign luxury goods. But Time Team are having trouble dating the site. They are joined by Steve Hartgroves from Cornwall County Council, Finds specialist Carl Thorpe, and Byzantine expert Anthea Harris.
187	11	"Five Thousand Tons of Stone"	Hamsterley, County Durham	54.692457°N 1.840365°W	16 March 2008
The Time Team travel to County Durham to investigate the origins of a mysterious large stone structure which has had locals baffled for centuries.
188	12	"The Romans Recycle"	Wickenby, Lincolnshire	53.336229°N 0.358506°W	23 March 2008
Over the years a metal detectorist has found more than 300 metal artefacts from the Roman, Iron-Age and Anglo-Saxon periods on a site that covers several fields between two villages. The Team tries to find out what the site was used for.
189	13	"Hunting King Harold"	Portskewett, Monmouthshire	51.589040°N 2.725399°W	30 March 2008
Harold's Field has long been rumoured as a site where Harold Godwinson, later to become King Harold, built a hunting lodge in 1065 after defeating the Welsh. The site is a scheduled monument, protected from excavation; but a local petition has succeeded in persuading Cadw to allow digging. So Time Team have been invited in to do their stuff. While Stewart believes there are signs of medieval occupation, any finds from an earlier, Saxon period would be a first for this area of Wales. The team are joined by historians Sam Newton and Jeremy Knight, local pottery expert Steve Clarke, and maritime archaeologist Nigel Nayling.
