= Time Team series 16 =

Time Team
- Season 16
- No. of episodes: 13

Release
- Original network: Channel 4
- Original release: 4 January – 29 March 2009

Series chronology
- ← Previous; Series 15 Next → Series 17

This is a list of Time Team episodes from series 16. The series was released on DVD (region 2) in 2013.

== Episode ==
=== Series 16 ===
Episode # refers to the air date order. The Time Team Specials are aired in between regular episodes, but are omitted from this list. Regular contributors on Time Team include: Tony Robinson (presenter); archaeologists Mick Aston, Phil Harding, Helen Geake, Francis Pryor, Brigid Gallagher, Jackie McKinley, Raksha Dave, Matt Williams, Faye Simpson; Guy de la Bedoyere (Roman historian); Victor Ambrus (illustrator); Stewart Ainsworth (landscape investigator); John Gater (geophysicist); Henry Chapman (surveyor); Paul Blinkhorn (pottery expert), Mark Corney (coin expert); Raysan Al-Kubaisi (computer graphics).

No. overall	No. in season	Title	Location	Coordinates	Original release date
194	1	"The Trouble with Temples"	Friar's Wash, Hertfordshire	51.8193°N 0.4045°W	4 January 2009
Time Team has never found a Roman temple. But a 30-year-old photograph clearly shows double square cropmarks in a field. Surely this time they will strike lucky? The trouble is, the site may have suffered plough damage. Francis takes charge. Though initial excavations are encouraging, John and Stewart are puzzled by a geophysical anomaly. Including a tessellated pavement and a coin hoard, a picture gradually emerges of not one but four temples - in fact a whole complex of buildings. It proves to be one of the most important excavations in Time Team history.
195	2	"The Wedding Present"	Scargill, County Durham	54.49173°N 1.91868°W	11 January 2009
The restored ruins of a castle gatehouse given as a wedding present hide complex mediaeval and Tudor remains.
196	3	"Heroes' Hill"	Knockdhu, County Antrim	54.89111°N 5.905278°W	18 January 2009
A previously unexcavated massive Bronze Age promontory fort conceals the remains of a sophisticated society.
197	4	"Toga Town"	Caerwent, Monmouthshire	51.6133°N 2.7700°W	25 January 2009
Caerwent in South Wales is Britain's best-preserved Roman town; but there are still unexplored pockets. Neil wants to find some Roman retail outlets, but Mick is more interested in medieval remains. Louise Revell describes existing features, including the basilica and the central forum where political debates would have taken place. Geophysics suggests a full-scale Roman villa on the site. The diggers are uncovering a maze of walls, which are hard to understand. From a second century handbook, Louise gives Phil and Matt some tips about Roman oratory. Meanwhile Stewart is playing with a groma, a Roman surveying tool. At the finale Phil and Matt engage in a debate, kitted out in their togas. Finds include a 3rd century coin, a tool for removing earwax, a twisted wire bracelet, and a folding penknife handle decorated with gladiators. They are also joined by Roman archaeologist Peter Guest.
198	5	"Blood, Sweat and Beers"	Rise Hill, Cumbria	54.29789°N 2.35983°W	1 February 2009
Time Team visit the Rise Hill navvy camp near Garsdale, created for the construction of the Settle-Carlisle railway. This is the first such site ever excavated. They are joined by industrial archaeologists Bill Bevan and Mike Nevell, and historian David Holmes, to create a picture of the people who built much of industrial Britain. But the dig is hampered by heavy rain. Matt is roped in to live the life of a navvy for a day.
199	6	"Buried Bishops and Belfries"	Salisbury Cathedral, Wiltshire	51.064722°N 1.7975°W	8 February 2009
The team are on Phil's home turf, where 200 years ago some of the cathedral's most beautiful buildings were demolished, including a bell tower and two chapels. Moreover, there is a mystery surrounding leg-bones discovered under one of the chapels. Could they belong to Bishop Beauchamp (pronounced "Beecham"), who built one of the chapels? Bone specialist Jackie thinks she can solve the mystery. The team are hoping to get an insight into the purpose and function of this magnificent medieval structure, as well as the city that surrounds it. Stewart is more interested in Constable's famous watercolour of the cathedral. Raysan builds a lego model, and Brigid finds a unique coin. They make some interesting discoveries about the foundations of these various buildings. They are joined by the cathedral archaeologist Tim Tatton-Brown, and historic buildings consultant Richard K. Morris. Historian Elaine Chalus talks to Helen about the charismatic personality of Bishop Beauchamp himself.
200	7	"Anarchy in the UK"	Radcot, Oxfordshire	51.693081°N 1.588644°W	15 February 2009
Time Team camp for three days next to the oldest bridge on the River Thames. Previous surveys have convinced local archaeologists that an early Norman castle existed here, with connections to Queen Matilda and the Anarchy. But there are also tantalizing links to the much later English Civil War. Almost immediately, pottery sherds and walls are revealed, with plenty of Roman fragments suggesting a Roman settlement. In all likelihood the Anglo-Saxons lived here too. The team test out a medieval trebuchet. They are joined by John Blair of Oxford University, geophysicist Roger Ainslie, and castles expert Richard K. Morriss.
201	8	"Mystery of the Ice Cream Villa"	Colworth, Bedfordshire	52.23212°N 0.57711°W	22 February 2009
Stacks of high quality Roman remains have been found in a rural field near an ice cream research centre, including a huge collection of coins. It points to a high status building, possibly a villa. But it's far from any road, and geophysics doesn't come up with anything definite, apart from a large square ditch. Stewart identifies a potential Roman road, running right past the site. Though they are unable to find a substantial stone building, the outline of an Iron Age round house emerges, showing continuity of occupation over hundreds or thousands of years. Late on day three, evidence of a Roman structure emerges. They are joined by Roman coin specialist Philippa Walton, Ben Robinson from Peterborough City Council and Louise Revell from Southampton University.
202	9	"Hermit Harbour"	Looe, Cornwall	50.34086°N 4.45412°W	1 March 2009
Legends surround this tiny island off Cornwall's south coast, including a visit by Christ himself, brought here by Joseph of Arimathea from distant Glastonbury. The team are out to discover the truth behind the myths. Could this island have witnessed the birth of Christianity in Britain? They are hampered by the tide, which limits the time allowed for digging. Previous digs have linked the now-vanished St. Michael's Chapel on the hill to the Celtic dark ages following the Roman occupation. It would certainly have been a beacon for pilgrims and overseas traders through the ages; and there are tantalising hints of prehistoric activity. The chapel seems to be mirrored by a similar structure on the mainland, which the team are also attempting to excavate. They are joined by historian Nicholas Orme, Oliver Creighton from Exeter University and Finds specialist Carl Thorpe. Investigating possible wrecks are two divers from the Royal Navy.
203	10	"Called to the Bar"	Lincoln's Inn, London	51.516448°N 0.113760°W	8 March 2009
Amidst the grand buildings that make up one of the world's oldest and most distinguished law societies, they have been asked to discover the remains of a 13th-century palace that belonged to Henry III's Lord Chancellor.
204	11	"Beacon on the Fens"	Chapel Head, Cambridgeshire	52.415706°N 0.028039°W	15 March 2009
A little mound of earth known as Chapel Head has intrigued archaeologists for years. There are ornately carved stone blocks around the hill, and beautiful flint axes that are at least 4000 years old have also been found. Early signs are of a medieval chapel, and very soon a cobbled surface shows building of that period. But Francis is having trouble locating a bronze age ring ditch. The team are joined by Ben Robinson from Peterborough Museum, and medieval pottery expert Paul Spoerry.
205	12	"The Hollow Way"	Ulnaby, County Durham	54.549014°N 1.649417°W	22 March 2009
The distinctive grass-covered remains of the deserted medieval village of Ulnaby are a landmark in the Durham countryside, but they have never been dug. The Team have been invited to investigate one of the best-preserved archaeological sites in Britain. With medieval historian Dawn Hadley, Tony looks at the history of Ulnaby. Michelle Brown of the British Library examines the 14th century Luttrell Psalter, providing clues about the people's lifestyle. Mick is shown a replica of a medieval horsedrawn plough, while Brigid finds a coin, and Matt uncovers a quern-stone.
206	13	"Skeletons in the Shed"	Blythburgh, Suffolk	52.32183°N 1.59640°E	29 March 2009
When the new owners of a house in Blythburgh in Suffolk explored their potting shed they were shocked to discover a cupboard full of human skulls. Could these remains have something to do with the superb ruins of a medieval priory that has lain hidden for years? The priory fell into disuse before Henry VIII's dissolution of the monasteries, and may contain the remains of a 7th century Saxon King, Anna. But despite digging several trenches in the back garden, the team struggle to make sense of it all. They are joined by historian Sam Newton.
