= Time Team series 14 =

Time Team
- Season 14
- No. of episodes: 13

Release
- Original network: Channel 4
- Original release: 14 January – 8 April 2007

Series chronology
- ← Previous; Series 13 Next → Series 15

This is a list of Time Team episodes from series 14.

== Episode ==
=== Series 14 ===
Episode # refers to the air date order. The Time Team Specials are aired in between regular episodes, but are omitted from this list. Regular contributors on Time Team include: Tony Robinson (presenter); archaeologists Mick Aston, Phil Harding, Helen Geake, Brigid Gallagher, Raksha Dave, Matt Williams; Francis Pryor (historian); Jackie McKinley (osteoarchaeologist); Victor Ambrus (illustrator); Stewart Ainsworth (landscape investigator); John Gater (geophysicist); Henry Chapman (surveyor); Paul Blinkhorn (pottery); Mark Corney (Roman expert); Raysan Al-Kubaisi (computer graphics).

No. overall	No. in season	Title	Location	Coordinates	Original release date
158	1	"Finds on the Fairway"	Mount Murray, Isle of Man	54.140615°N 4.552331°W	14 January 2007
The team battle the tail end of Hurricane Gordon to investigate the last keeill standing, preserved beneath a golf course on the Isle of Man. A thousand years ago the island was dotted with these keeills, or small stone chapels, most of which have completely disappeared. Mick, an avowed enthusiast for early Christian buildings, is in his element. Sensational finds keep coming, including perfectly preserved plaited human hair, and a specimen of Ogham script. The team are joined by local archaeologist Andy Johnson, keeill expert Nick Johnson, and Viking specialist Dawn Hadley.
159	2	"There's No Place Like Rome"	Blacklands, near Frome, Somerset	51.285410°N 2.336253°W	21 January 2007
The team are in Somerset to investigate the remains of a small Roman villa, dating back to just after the time of the Roman invasion in 43 A.D. But previous excavations suggest it was occupied by local inhabitants rather than Roman invaders. Could it have been built on the site of an earlier, Iron Age settlement? The team are joined by Roman specialists John Creighton and Tom Moore; and Claire Ryley makes an authentic period garden. Members of the Stranglers put in a surprise appearance.
160	3	"School Diggers Medieval"	Hooke Court, Dorset	50.800806°N 2.666475°W	28 January 2007
The team are in Hooke Court, Dorset to investigate a moated manor house with a mysterious past. Now used as a school, the grounds contain remains of buildings from the past 500 years and as the trenchers begin their work, the finds start to pile up. Though they are particularly looking for evidence of the Civil War, there are signs of activity from several different periods, including medieval and Tudor. The team are joined by historians Sam Newton and Jonathan Foyle. The school's pupils get involved in all aspects of the dig. As usual, Stewart has his own ideas about the site, and is skeptical about the idea of a moat.
161	4	"The Druids' Last Stand"	Amlwch, Anglesey	53.405465°N 4.395224°W	4 February 2007
Time Team are in the Island of Anglesey in North Wales, investigating a system of earthworks, not noticed until 2006 when identified by a light aircraft. Is it Iron Age or Roman? Though the locals believe that the ancient sect of the Druids was active in this area, the team are struggling to find anything that has not been ploughed away. But towards the end of the dig they make a completely unexpected find. The team are joined by Ken Brassil of the National Museum Wales. Using traditional techniques, local archaeologists make a wicker man, with a strange resemblance to a member of the team.
162	5	"Sharpe's Redoubt"	Sandgate, Kent	51.076135°N 1.130013°E	11 February 2007
The team investigate the remains of Shorncliffe Redoubt, the first fort built to defend the English south coast from invasion by revolutionary French forces in the 1790s.
163	6	"A Port and Stilton"	Stilton, Cambridgeshire	52.493863°N 0.279640°W	18 February 2007
The team visit a site near the Roman road of Ermine Street, where a clutch of Roman objects has been discovered. But field-walking has also produced Anglo-Saxon artefacts, and it becomes apparent that the site had more historical activity than first anticipated. Unlike today, the terrain would have been largely boggy and marshy. The archaeology increasingly points to a Roman industrial site with strong evidence of pottery manufacture and export. But after the Romans left, it may have taken on an important monastic role - much to Mick's delight. The team attempt to reproduce a Roman kiln. Finally, towards the end of day three, John's geophysics uncovers a possible neolithic enclosure. They even find time for cheese tasting, though Stilton is not actually the place where Stilton cheese is made. They are joined by Philippa Walton from the PAS, and Ben Robinson of Peterborough Museum.
164	7	"A Tale of Two Villages"	Wicken, Northamptonshire	52.048170°N 0.914954°W; 52.046576°N 0.919587°W	25 February 2007
The team descend on the village of Wicken to investigate the local history. Digging in residents' gardens and surrounding fields, the team uncover a mysterious church, an ancient burial ground and evidence of a Saxon community.
166	8	"No Stone Unturned"	Warburton, Greater Manchester	53.396554°N 2.438536°W	4 March 2007
The team arrive at a field outside Cheshire where metal detectorists have made several valuable finds in the past, hinting the site was once a very active Roman settlement. However, the complete lack of finds causes serious concern amongst our intrepid explorers. They are joined by Mike Nevell from the University of Manchester, Roman historian David Shotter, and Robert Philpott from Liverpool Museum. Archeometallurgist Andrew Lacey fashions a simple Roman snake bracelet. Famously, this is the episode where Tony declares "We've done what we always threatened: after 160 programmes, we found - nothing."
167	9	"The Domesday Mill"	Dotton, Devon	50.689403°N 3.295137°W	11 March 2007
Time Team have never excavated a watermill before. Despite the fact that they were plentiful in historic times, these features have been under-researched. Heading to the River Otter in Devon, the team excavate a site dating back at least to the Domesday Book of 1086, yet the last mill building on the site was pulled down as recently as the 1960s. They are joined by Martin Watts (mill historian), industrial archaeologist Mike Nevell, and Finds specialist John Allan. Tony visits the working mill at nearby Otterton.
168	10	"The Cheyne Gang"	Chesham Bois, Buckinghamshire	51.688032°N 0.600434°W	18 March 2007
Archaeologists in Chesham in Buckinghamshire believe they've found the remains of a medieval building under the manicured lawns of a Georgian house.
169	11	"Road to the Relics"	Godstone, Surrey	51.240100°N 0.0666°W	25 March 2007
The team are excited at the prospect of finding a possible Roman temple. Will this be a first for Time Team?
170	12	"The Abbey Habit"	Poulton, Cheshire	53.125909°N 2.888253°W	1 April 2007
Tony Robinson and the team travel to the Welsh border in search of the abandoned Poulton Abbey that was once briefly used by Cistercian monks. Mick is delighted to be researching his favourite subject, monastic history. Though local archaeologists have found a chapel and plenty of other remains (including skeletons), there is no sign of the abbey. As the hunt drags on without any major progress, some of the team come up with a controversial theory. The team are joined by Mike Emery and Alan Wilmshurst from the Poulton Research Project, architectural historian Jonathan Clark, local historian Alan Thacker, and Finds specialist Debbie Klemperer.
171	13	"In the Shadow of the Tor"	Bodmin Moor, Cornwall	50.603806°N 4.627464°W	8 April 2007
The Team descend on the bleak, beautiful landscape of Bodmin Moor to face one their biggest challenges yet. The dig aims to date a possible Bronze Age village of stone houses. But alongside the village is a vast and mysterious 500-metre-long stone structure. The team are joined by Peter Herring of Cornwall Heritage Trust and environmental archaeologist Ben Gearey.
