= Time Team series 19 =

Time Team
- Season 19

Release
- Original network: Channel 4
- Original release: 22 January 2012 – May 13, 2012

Series chronology
- ← Previous; Series 18 Next → Series 20

This is a list of Time Team episodes from series 19. The series was released on DVD (region 2) in 2014.

== Episode ==
=== Series 19 ===
Episode # refers to the air date order. The Time Team Specials are aired in between regular episodes, but are omitted from this list. Regular contributors on Time Team include: presenters Tony Robinson, Mary-Ann Ochota; archaeologists Mick Aston, Phil Harding, Helen Geake, Raksha Dave, Matt Williams, Alex Langlands, Tracey Smith, Cassie Newland; Jackie McKinley (osteoarchaeologist); Victor Ambrus (illustrator); John Gater (geophysicist); Paul Blinkhorn (pottery expert).

| No. overall | No. in season | Title | Location | Coordinates | Original release date |
|---|---|---|---|---|---|
| 243 | 1 | "Dig by Wire" | Gateholm Island, Pembrokeshire | 51°43′10″N 5°13′50″W | 22 January 2012 |
Tony Robinson and the team visit a tiny windswept island off the coast of Wales. The only way to get to it is by rigging a 500-metre zip wire way above the wave-lashed rocks.
| 244 | 2 | "A Village Affair" | Bitterley, Shropshire | 52°23′29″N 2°37′56″W | 29 January 2012 |
There's a problem in the chocolate-box village of Bitterley in Shropshire. The village's school and cottages cluster prettily around the green. But the village church and the manor house lie more than half a mile away, on the other side of a lumpy, bumpy empty field.
| 245 | 3 | "The Drowned Town" | Dunwich, Suffolk | 52°16′34″N 1°37′48″E | 5 February 2012 |
Tony Robinson and the Team head to Dunwich, a village that's literally falling off the edge of the UK. Coastal erosion has eaten away most of this once-bustling settlement, and before the whole place is lost to the sea, there's a last chance to find out more about the lost origins of this dramatically situated town. The team are joined by historian Mark Bailey, architectural consultant Richard K. Morriss, Kyle Brown from the Environment Agency, John Ette from English Heritage, and Professor David Sear.
| 246 | 4 | "The First King of Racing" | Newmarket, Suffolk | 52°14′38″N 0°24′26″E | 12 February 2012 |
Tony and the Team visit Newmarket, the birthplace of horseracing, in search of the earliest archaeological traces of the sport of kings. They dig in the heart of the historic town, in search of the remains of King Charles II's racing stables - arguably the world's first stables dedicated to racing. Bone specialist Jackie McKinley talks about horse skeletons with Christopher Garibaldi at the National Horseracing Museum.
| 247 | 5 | "Chapel of Secrets" | Beadnell, Northumberland | 55°33′04″N 1°37′18″W | 19 February 2012 |
Tony leads the Team to the village of Beadnell on a beautiful stretch of the Northumbrian coast, to explore an unusual promontory, from which mysterious fragments of human bone have emerged over recent years. The team are joined by Anglo-Saxon historian Sam Newton, vicar Jane Wood and small finds expert Danielle Wootton. Calligrapher Suzanne Moore investigates techniques used by monks inscribing and illuminating the Lindisfarne Gospels.
| 248 | 6 | "A Copper Bottomed Dig" | Pentrechwyth, Swansea | 51°38′02″N 3°55′59″W | 26 February 2012 |
Two hundred years ago, Swansea was one of the wealthiest cities in the country, if not the world. The source of those riches was neither the coal nor the steel recently associated with the area, but copper.
| 249 | 7 | "The Only Earl Is Essex" | Colne Priory, Essex | 51°55′36″N 0°42′36″E | 4 March 2012 |
Tony and the team rip up the pristine lawns of Paul Whight's stately home in search of the secrets of its illustrious former owners: the De Veres, who built a priory here in the 12th century. They are also hoping to discover the later manor house. There is a rumour that the dissolute 17th Earl, Edward, wrote at least some of William Shakespeare's plays, and could be buried here, along with his ancestors and descendants. Geophysics is now able to produce 3D images of what is underground; while Jackie has plenty of bones to look at. Alex helps stone carver Lucy Churchill to carve some de Vere symbols from blocks of rare alabaster. Among the many finds are stained glass and encaustic tiles. They are joined by Anna Whitelock from the University of London. Finally, state-of-the-art laser technology entombs Alex in his own sarcophagus.
| 250 | 8 | "Secrets of the Dunes" | Kenfig, Bridgend | 51°31′44″N 3°43′44″W | 18 March 2012 |
Eight hundred years ago the people of Kenfig on the south coast of Wales thought they had built the perfect town, nestled round a harbour with easy access to the sea and a sheltered position. The town appears to have been a thriving commercial success but then it vanished, leaving just a few castle walls to mark its existence.
| 252 | 9 | "Rome's Wild West" | Caerleon, Newport | 51°36′24″N 2°57′58″W | 25 March 2012 |
The Roman legionary fort of Caerleon in South Wales is one of the most famous and best preserved Roman sites in Britain. But just outside the fort, archaeologists have discovered signs of yet another huge structure leading from the fort down to the river.
| 253 | 10 | "How to Lose a Castle" | Crewkerne, Somerset | 50°53′32″N 2°49′29″W | 1 April 2012 |
For generations a family of Somerset farmers have been wondering if there was ever actually a castle on top of the hill they call Castle Hill. A medieval charter refers to a Norman castle in the area, but they are not clear about exactly where and there are several likely locations. Geophysics' radar shows a large rectangular structure, possibly a keep. There is debate as to whether it was timber or stone. Raksha and Paul are excited by some 12th century pottery, indicating that the building may date from the Anarchy period rather than the Norman conquest. Moreover, a metal spur hints at a cavalry based fort. They are joined by castles expert Marc Morris, and quarryman Zak England demonstrates how to split a stone. Phil tastes mead for the first time. Mick is beginning to doubt whether the building was ever completed.
| 254 | 11 | "King John's Lost Palace" | Clipstone, Nottinghamshire | 53°10′36″N 1°05′56″W | 8 April 2012 |
Tony and the Team don their hunting green, pick up their bows and arrows and head for the fringes of Sherwood Forest, where residents of Clipstone village in Nottinghamshire believe some impressive ruins in a farmer's field may have played a part in the ancient tales of Robin Hood and Bad King John. Landowner Mickey Bradley hopes that the site will be preserved as a heritage site. High class stone carvings indicate what is likely to be one of King John's hunting lodges or a ceremonial hall, rather than a fully fledged palace. They are joined by Tony Rotherham, who describes the practices and terrible punishments meted out to local poachers such as Robin Hood. He was probably only one of many outlaws inhabiting these forests, which were maintained by royalty for hunting and other amusements. Tony Rotherham also demonstrates the unmaking ritual, or butchery of a deer carcass.
| 256 | 12 | "Time Team's Guide to Burial - Compilation" | N/A | N/A | 29 April 2012 |
Tony Robinson investigates how burial customs have changed and evolved over thousands of years of British history.
| 257 | 13 | "Time Team's Greatest Discoveries - Compilation." | N/A | N/A | 13 May 2012 |
Revisiting digs that produced rare and fine jewellery, gold coins, huge and intricate mosaics - and some extraordinary archaeological fakery - Mick Aston, Phil Harding and Helen Geake defend and debate their choices for Time Team's greatest discoveries.
