= Time Team series 17 =

Time Team
- Season 17

Release
- Original network: Channel 4
- Original release: 18 April 2010 – 17 April 2011

Series chronology
- ← Previous; Series 16 Next → Series 18

This is a list of Time Team episodes from series 17. The series was released on DVD (region 2) in 2013.

== Episode ==
=== Series 17 ===
Episode # refers to the air date order. The Time Team Specials are aired in between regular episodes, but are omitted from this list. Regular contributors on Time Team include: Tony Robinson (presenter); archaeologists Mick Aston, Phil Harding, Helen Geake; Guy de la Bedoyere (historian); Victor Ambrus (illustrator); Stewart Ainsworth (landscape investigator); John Gater (geophysicist); Henry Chapman (surveyor).

No. overall	No. in season	Title	Location	Coordinates	Original release date
210	1	"Corridors of Power"	Westminster Abbey, London	51°29′58″N 0°07′39″W	18 April 2010
Surrounded by the sites and sounds of Parliament Square the archaeologists have three days to pin down the location of a lost sacristy and uncover the Anglo-Saxon origins of the Abbey.
211	2	"A Saintly Site"	Isle of Mull, Inner Hebrides	56°36′42″N 6°04′52″W	25 April 2010
Time Team descend on the Isle of Mull at the invitation of two local amateur archaeologists to investigate a mysterious set of earthworks in a forest near Tobermory. Could they be the remains of a chapel from the time of St Columba?
212	3	"Bridge Over the River Tees"	Piercebridge, County Durham	54°32′7″N 1°40′28″W	2 May 2010
Tony Robinson and the Team get their feet wet as they examine a stretch of the River Tees where local divers have found over 2000 Roman finds. With part of the site beneath the water some of Time Team's finest have to squeeze into wet suits and brave the fast flowing river. They are joined by English Heritage's Ben Robinson.
213	4	"In the Halls of a Saxon King"	Sutton Courtenay, Oxfordshire (actually Drayton, Oxfordshire)	51°38′23″N 1°17′43″W	9 May 2010
The Team tries to locate one of the rarest of archaeological sites – an Anglo-Saxon royal complex. Aerial photos suggest this empty Oxfordshire field could have been the home of royalty over a thousand years ago, but is it ever that simple?
214	5	"The Massacre in the Cellar"	Hopton Castle, Shropshire	52°23′45″N 2°55′54″W	16 May 2010
The team visit the remains of Hopton Castle in Shropshire and attempt to put together a piece-by-piece reconstruction of the battle which took place there during the English Civil War.
216	6	"Potted History"	Mildenhall, Wiltshire	51°25′23″N 1°41′27″W	23 May 2010
The Team have been unearthing the remains of Cunetio, a Roman town in Mildenhall. It is the first proper excavation of the town in over fifty years.
218	7	"Death and Dominoes: The First POW Camp"	Norman Cross, Cambridgeshire	52°30′20″N 00°17′25″W	3 October 2010
Tony, joined by English Heritage's Ben Robinson and others, explores the world's first purpose built prisoner of war camp.
219	8	"Something for the Weekend"	Tregruk Castle, Llangybi, Monmouthshire	51°40′17″N 2°55′15″W	10 October 2010
221	9	"Governor's Green"	Governor's Green, Portsmouth	50°47′19″N 1°06′11″W	24 October 2010
The Team visit Portsmouth to try and uncover one of the city's oldest buildings - a medieval hospital. But after three days of bone-chilling weather and confusing archaeology can the Team work out what stood on Governor's Green over 500 years ago?
222	10	"Priory Engagement"	Burford, Oxfordshire	51°48′28″N 1°38′13″W	31 October 2010
The Team descend upon the Oxfordshire town of Burford to respond to very special challenge - from Time Team's own Professor Mick Aston. They have just three days to uncover a medieval hospital under the front lawn whilst searching for Anglo-Saxons in the vegetable garden.
223	11	"There Is a Villa Here Somewhere"	Litlington, Cambridgeshire	52°03′57″N 0°05′14″W	7 November 2010
But has 18th-century quarrying destroyed all meaningful evidence? Ben Robinson supervises this dig in the absence of Mick Aston. The end results are shown to the appreciative villagers.
224	12	"Commanding Heights"	Dinmore Hill, Herefordshire	52°09′39″N 2°42′04″W	14 November 2010
Tony and the Time Team climb a remote Herefordshire hill to investigate one of the biggest prehistoric sites ever featured. Was Dinmore Hill the site of a vast Iron Age hill fort? Needless to say Stewart does not think so. He is going with a much earlier cross-ridge dyke. To prove it one way or the other they need dateable finds. But the dig is hampered by torrential rain. Despite this they uncover a huge, magnificent ditch, which must have been dug by thousands of people during the Iron Age. The team are joined by historian Bettany Hughes, Hereford county archaeologist Keith Ray and environmental archaeologist Mike Allen.
