= Time Team series 20 =

Time Team
- Season 20

Release
- Original network: Channel 4
- Original release: 11 November 2012 – 24 March 2013

Series chronology
- ← Previous; Series 19 Next → Series 21

This is a list of Time Team episodes from series 20. The series was released on DVD (region 2) in 2014.

== Episode ==
=== Series 20 ===
Episode # refers to the air date order. The Time Team Specials are aired in between regular episodes, but are omitted from this list. Regular contributors on Time Team include: Tony Robinson (presenter); archaeologists Phil Harding, Helen Geake, Neil Holbrook, Raksha Dave, Matt Williams, Tracey Smith, Naomi Sewpaul; Victor Ambrus (illustrator); Francis Pryor (historian); Stewart Ainsworth (landscape investigator); John Gater, Jimmy Adcock (geophysics); Paul Blinkhorn (pottery expert); Jackie McKinley (bone expert); Danni Wootton (small finds).

No. overall	No. in season	Title	Location	Coordinates	Original release date
259	1	"The Forgotten Gunners of WWI"	Grantham, Lincolnshire	52°55′53″N 0°36′50″W	11 November 2012
The 20th series begins with an examination of what life was like for the First World War Machine Gun Corps, revealing the lost secrets of Belton House, the stately home where they were trained.
260	2	"Brancaster"	Brancaster, Norfolk	52°57′50″N 0°39′07″E	6 January 2013
The National Trust Roman fort of Branodunum has produced some impressive aerial photographs of cropmarks, promising substantial buildings and multiple finds from the second to the fourth centuries AD. Some outstanding geophysics results are also hugely encouraging. If anything it was larger than the current Brancaster. The close proximity of the sea would have been vital to travel and commerce, and there was certainly much marine traffic. Among over 2000 finds are an extremely rare pewter dish, a belt ornament, Roman scale armour, and cockerel spurs indicating cockfighting. They are joined by County Archaeologist David Gurney, Philippa Walton from the British Museum, and Roman finds expert Mark Corney.
261	3	"A Capital Hill"	Ely, Cardiff	51°28′02″N 3°14′55″W	13 January 2013
Time Team investigate Caerau Hillfort, a huge hill near Cardiff that may be immensely significant; is it the long-lost Iron Age capital of South Wales? Geophysics shows multiple circular marks, indicating several roundhouses. However Francis is initially having trouble locating these structures in the ground. But there are finds a-plenty including a rare early Iron Age cup. They are joined by Iron Age specialist Niall Sharples, who explains that a hill fort's function is primarily domestic and social, rather than military. Kids from Ely are drafted in to help with the dig, and historian Ray Howell shows two of the kids some iron age artefacts in the National Museum Wales. Meanwhile metalworker David Chapman makes a bronze handle for a drinking cup.
262	4	"Henham's Lost Mansions"	Henham Park, Suffolk	52°20′30″N 1°36′4″E	20 January 2013
Tony and the Team help Hektor Rous, the son of 'Aussie Earl' Keith Rous, piece together the mysterious history of the family's Tudor country home in Suffolk. They are joined by Tudor historian Suzie Lipscomb and buildings expert Richard K. Morriss.
263	5	"Warriors"	Figheldean, Wiltshire	51°13′16″N 1°45′51″W	27 January 2013
Tony and the team work with volunteers from Operation Nightingale, an initiative to help injured veterans of the war in Afghanistan. They are investigating the ancient Barrow Clump on Salisbury Plain, where they discover burials from 2000BC and rare Saxon finds. The team are joined by Richard Osgood, an archaeologist from the Ministry of Defence.
264	6	"Lost Mines of Lakeland"	Coniston, Cumbria	54°22′52″N 3°6′11″W	3 February 2013
Tony and the team make their way to the Lake District on an expedition that takes them both higher and deeper than they've ever been before. They are looking for a forgotten piece of the nation's industrial heritage - the Lake District used to be a major source of valuable copper.
265	7	"Horseshoe Hall"	Oakham Castle, Rutland	52°40′15″N 0°43′39″W	10 February 2013
Time Team investigate Oakham Castle in the tiny county of Rutland. It's Britain's best preserved 12th-century building but its grounds are full of mysterious lumps and bumps crying out to be investigated. The team are joined by site director Neil Holbrook, historian Marc Morris, architectural historian Richard K. Morriss, Tim Allen from English Heritage, and ceramicist Jane Young. Danni Wootton looks at some small finds.
266	8	"Mystery of the Thames-side Villa"	Dropshort, Oxfordshire	51°38′30″N 1°17′14″W	17 February 2013
Roman remains have been turning up in an Oxfordshire field for decades, where a student in the 1960s believed he had uncovered a Roman mosaic. Is this the site of a lost grand Roman villa? Neil Holbrook takes charge, with contributions from Louise Revell (Roman archaeologist) and Mark Corney (Roman finds expert). Finds include a rare piece of Roman glass, a cheese press and a huge rustic pot from the 4th century. Stewart believes the River Thames used to run much closer to this site during Roman times.
267	9	"The Lost Castle of Dundrum"	Dundrum Castle, County Down	54°15′43″N 5°50′41″W	24 February 2013
The team are working with Colm Donnelly, Finbar McCormick and others from Queen's University, Belfast. Their brief is to investigate an impressive ruin in County Down, Northern Ireland. It is associated with John de Courcy and his renegade Norman knights. But when was it built, and what did it look like? As it's a protected monument, their dig is strictly limited. Francis takes charge. Colm thinks the site shows remains of a much earlier structure, a cashel or defended stone enclosure from the Dark Ages. He shows Tony the nearby Drumena Cashel. Matt demonstrates the inferiority of primitive Irish armour against the full might of a mail-clad Norman knight with his huge charger, sword and bow.
268	10	"Wolsey's Lost Palace"	The More, Moor Park, Hertfordshire	51°38′02″N 0°26′14″W	3 March 2013
Tony and the team try to piece together the complete picture of the Manor of the More, a once impressive palace masterminded by Henry VIII's right-hand man, Cardinal Wolsey. In its heyday it was supposedly even more opulent than Wolsey's other masterpiece, Hampton Court. Built in 1520, it's now the site of Northwood Prep School; and Time Team are proposing to dig up their playing fields. Jackie McKinley takes charge. To survey the site from the air, instead of a helicopter they use a drone - a first for the programme. Danni Wootton enthuses over some gorgeous stained glass fragments. Phil's trench reveals signs of a grand gatehouse and a great turret. They are joined by archaeologist Martin Biddle, Tudor historian Suzannah Lipscomb and historic buildings expert Kent Rawlinson.
269	11	"An Englishman's Castle"	Upton Castle, Cosheston, Pembrokeshire	51°42′25″N 4°52′07″W	10 March 2013
On the invitation of the owners, Steve and Pru Barlow, Time Team try to discover if Upton Castle in Pembrokeshire was one of the Anglo-Norman castles built to defend 'Little England beyond Wales' from the locals. Unfortunately the castle was subject to much cosmetic alteration down the years. So some of the efforts centre around the chapel, which appears to be the earliest building on site, and may actually pre-date the castle. It contains a 14th century stone effigy, apparently of Sir William Malefant. Also the churchyard may yield some clues. Neil Holbrook supervises. The team are joined by historians Suzannah Lipscomb and Richard K. Morriss.
270	12	"The Time Team Guide to Experimental Archaeology"	N/A	N/A	17 March 2013
Tony Robinson reports on the more than 150 practical experiments and re-creations that he and the Team have conducted over 20 years in order to unlock the mysteries exposed by their digs. including 24 hours of solitary confinement, building a thatched roundhouse, potting, a Roman water wheel, a wicker man, smelting, forging weapons, building a wood henge.
271	13	"Twenty Years of Time Team"	N/A	N/A	24 March 2013
In this special celebration of the show, Tony Robinson relives the best bits from two decades and 230 episodes.
