= Time Team series 21 =

Time Team
- Season 21
- No. of episodes: 6

Release
- Original network: YouTube
- Original release: 18 March – 10 April 2022

Series chronology
- ← Previous; Series 20

This is a list of Time Team episodes from series 21.

Series 21 (Season 21) of Time Team follows two new digs, each released in extended 3-part episodes exclusively on the Time Team Official YouTube channel. The first dig explores a mysterious Iron Age site in Cornwall; the second investigates a huge Roman villa on the estate of a Tudor castle in Oxfordshire.

== Episode ==
=== Series 21 ===
Episode # refers to the air date order.

No. overall	No. in season	Title	Location	Coordinates	Original release date
281	1	"Boden Iron Age Fogou (Cornwall)"	Lizard Peninsula, Cornwall	TBA	20 March 2022
282	2	"Broughton Roman Villa"	Broughton Castle, Oxfordshire	TBA	8 April 2022
283	3	"Knights Hospitaller Preceptory"	Halston Hall, Shropshire	TBA	1 April 2023
284	4	"Anglo-Saxon Cemetery"	Winfarthing, Norfolk	TBA	2 July 2023
