= Whitley Castle =

Roman castle in the north of England, near Hadrian's Wall

Coordinates: 54.83203°N 2.47630°W

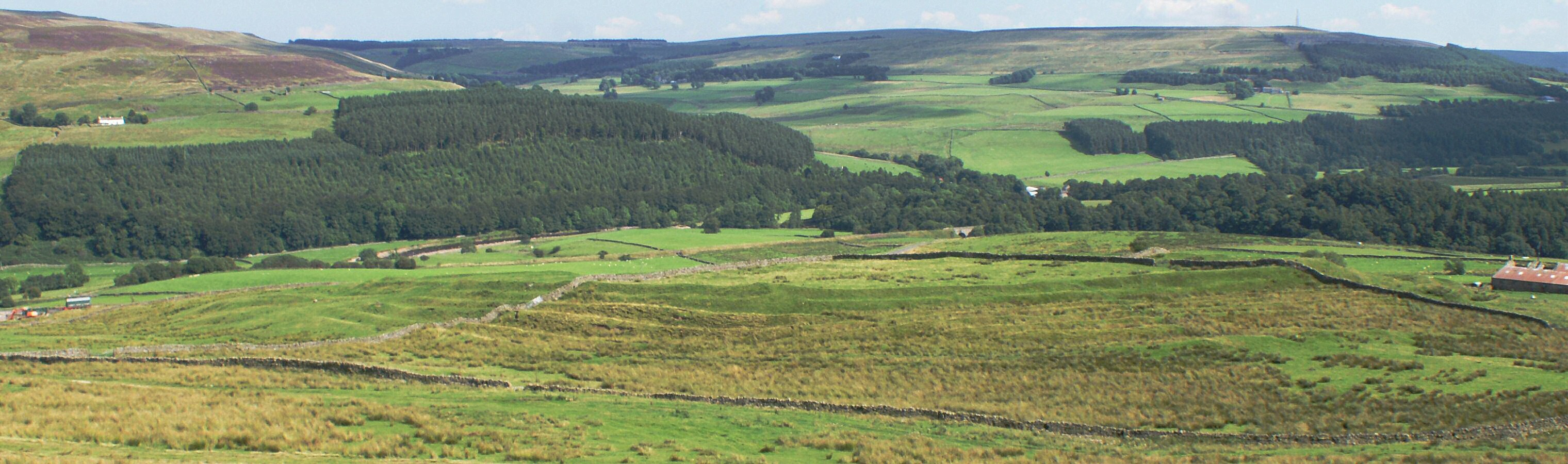
Whitley Castle (the Roman Epiacum) near Alston, Cumbria. The fort is south of Hadrian's Wall, and may have been situated to control local lead mining. The multiple banks and ditches on the uphill side, and the fort's exceptional lozenge shape, can be seen in the lower half of the photograph.

Whitley Castle (Epiacum) is a large, unusually shaped Roman fort (Latin: castra) north-west of the town of Alston, Cumbria, England. It is the highest stone-built Roman fort in Britain. The castrum, which was first built by the Roman Army early in the 2nd century AD, was partly demolished and rebuilt around 200 AD. It appears to have been sited to protect lead mining in the area as well as to support the border defences of Hadrian's Wall.

Unlike most Roman forts that have a "playing-card shape" (rectangular with rounded corners), Whitley Castle is lozenge-shaped to fit the site. Numerous banks and ditches ring the stone ramparts, making it among the most complex defensive earthworks of any fort known in the Roman Empire.

The site was surveyed by the geologist Thomas Sopwith in the 19th century and the historian R. G. Collingwood in the 20th century. In 2012, a geophysics survey was conducted by a team from Durham University but it has not been fully excavated. Among finds at the fort are altars with inscriptions to Hercules by Legio VI Victrix (normally stationed at Eboracum [York]) and to Apollo by the 2nd Cohort of Nervians, the garrison of auxiliaries. Other finds include a midden containing shoes; coins, fragments of Samian pottery, beads, nails, and a bronze handle shaped like a dolphin.

== Toponym ==
Although its English name is Whitley Castle, the Romans knew the fort as Epiacum. It is named in Ptolemy's Geography as the first town in the lands of Brigantes tribe in northeastern England. Its Latin name probably comes from a local British name *Epiakon "the property, or estate of Epios", Latinised as Epius. Epios may have been a local leader or chieftain of the Brigantes tribe. (Note: The suffix -acum is a widespread place name element in Brittany, the south-west of France and other regions including Wales, Cornwall and Ireland. It appears to be Gallic or Celtic (not Latin) in origin and it often indicates the land belonging to a named person. Its distribution and meaning are discussed in detail on the French Wikipedia at Suffixe -acum.)

== Location ==
Whitley Castle is about 1,000 ft (300 m) above sea level in the Pennine hills on the southern edge of Northumberland near its border with Cumbria. It lies to the west of the modern A689 road beside the Pennine Way long-distance footpath. During the Roman era, Epiacum was situated about 15 miles (24 km) south of Hadrian's Wall and 20 miles (32 km) north of the main road which ran between Luguvalium (Carlisle) in the northwest and Eboracum (York) in the southeast.

Whitley Castle is one of the most isolated Roman sites in Britain, which may help to explain both why it remains largely unexcavated as of 2018 and why so much of it has survived. The site is a lozenge-shaped spur of high ground on Castle Nook hill farm, under permanent pasture for sheep. The fort remains lie under the grass, and are most clearly seen in aerial photographs. The Roman fort itself covers about 4 acres (1.6 ha); outside it is a system of concentric defensive ditches.

The fort may have been sited to exert control over the area near Alston and its lead mines, as well as to provide support for Hadrian's Wall.

== History ==
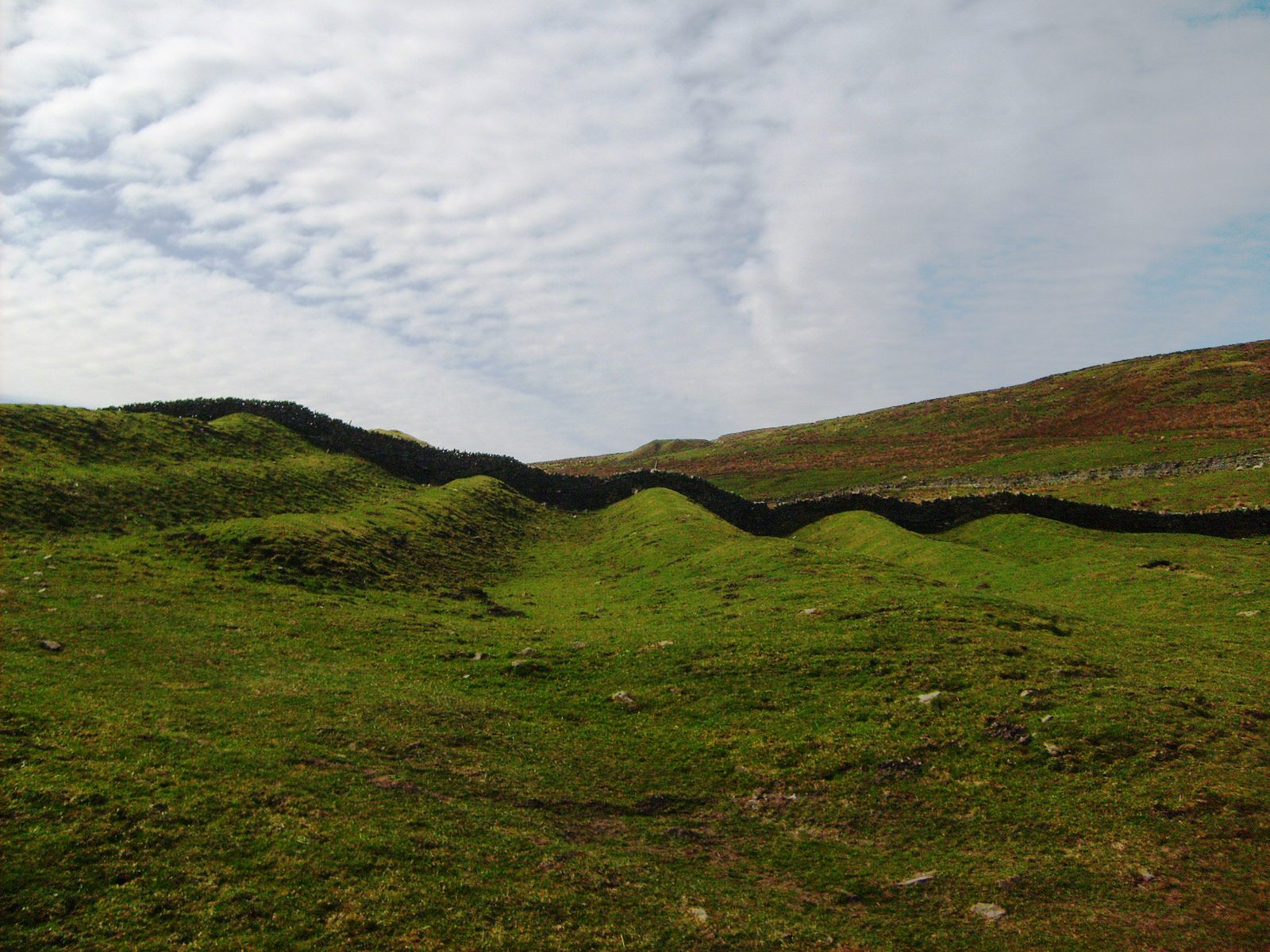
Multiple defensive ramparts on the north side of Epiacum

Epiacum was built early in the 2nd century AD. It was at least partly demolished and rebuilt around AD200; the destruction coincides with an uprising of the northern tribes in 196. The fort was modified or wholly rebuilt about the year 300. It appears to have been preceded by an Iron Age fort, followed by a Roman camp before the permanent fort was constructed.

Epiacum was in some ways a typical Roman fort: inside the wall were straight roads which crossed, a headquarters building (the Praetorium), the commandant's house, a set of barrack blocks for the cohort of auxiliary soldiers, and granaries to store food. Also as usual, there was a bath house and a temple (dedicated by the auxiliaries to the Emperor Caracalla) outside the wall. There was an altar to Mithras and another, as already mentioned, to Hercules.

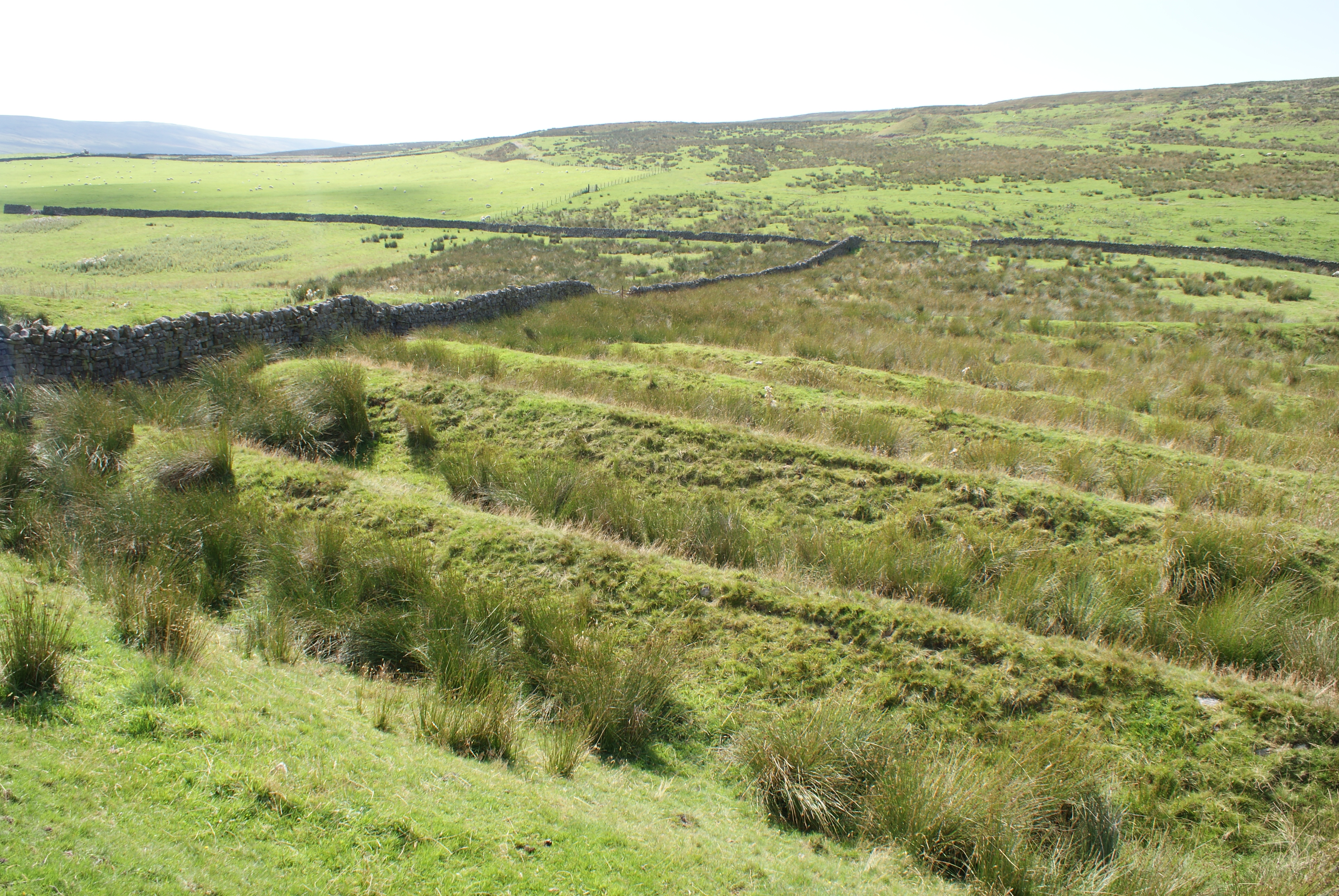
Seven banks and ditches (filled with rushes) on the western, uphill side of the Roman fort

Epiacum, however, has two unique features. First, the fort's military engineers modified the usual rectangular plan to suit the available site: it is distorted into a lozenge or parallelogram; the internal features of the fort are similarly distorted. Six barracks were however fitted in behind the headquarters building (principia), and four in front of it, in a limited area of 1.25 hectares (3.1 acres). Second, the wall is surrounded by four steep defensive ditches and banks around the hill spur, and seven such ramparts across the uphill side of the spur. These constitute the most complex defensive earthworks of any known Roman fort, with multiple banks and ditches outside the usual stone ramparts.

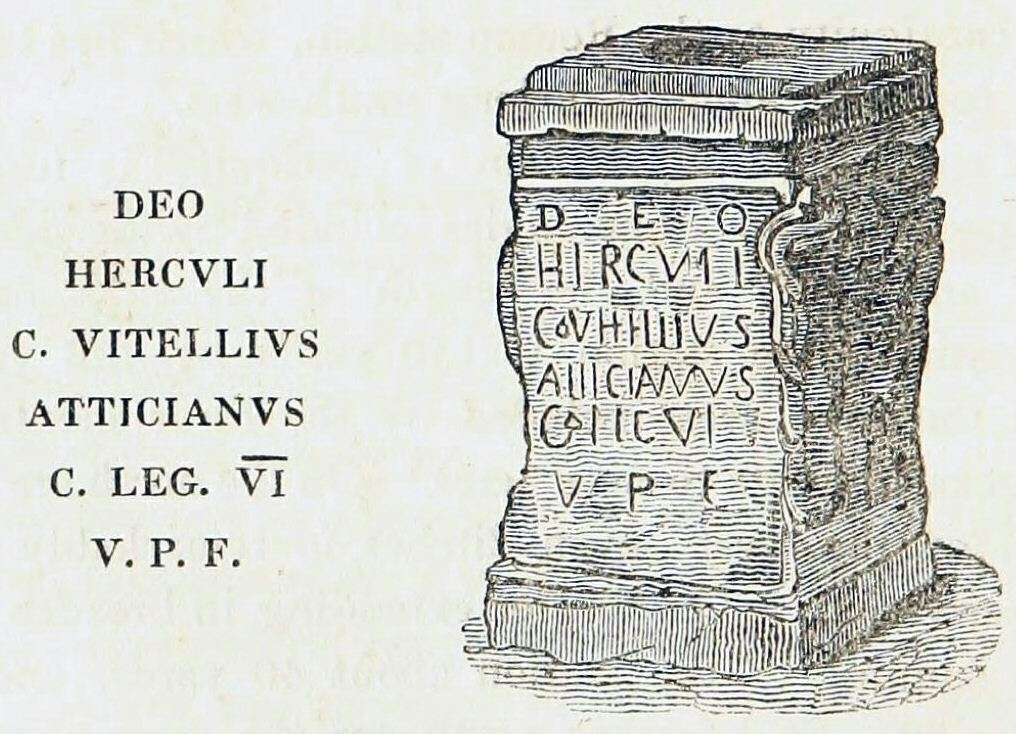
Illustration of an altar to Hercules found at Whitley Castle, from Thomas Sopwith, 1833. The altar is now in Bedford Museum.

Inscriptions on some of the altars found at Epiacum provide evidence of the Roman army units garrisoning the fort. One of these is inscribed "DEO HERCVLI C VITELLIVS ATTICIANVS > LEG VI V P F" ("To the god Hercules, Gaius Vitellius Atticianus, Centurion of the Legio VI Victrix, Loyal and Faithful, [erected this].") This was a regular army legion based at York.

Another altar is inscribed "DEO APOLLINI G...IVS ... ...COH II NER ..." ("To the god Apollo, Gaius Julius Marcius, [commander] of the 2nd Cohort of Nervians, [fulfilled his vow]."). This and two other inscriptions also naming the 2nd Nervians, auxiliaries from the lower Rhine, date to 213–221 AD. The altar was in a socket of a big stone slab supported by four columns, each topped by a coin; one of these was dated to 141–161 AD. (Note: This altar and its slab can now be seen in the Great North Museum in Newcastle upon Tyne.)

== Archaeology ==
Little archaeological research has taken place at Whitley Castle. In 1810, the Revd. John Hodgson excavated the bath house, in the north-east corner of Epiacum. In 1825 several leather shoes were recovered from a Roman rubbish tip when a Mr Henderson was cutting a drainage ditch. The geologist Thomas Sopwith surveyed the fort, describing it, its baths and the midden (waste heap) in 1833 as follows:

Still further north [of the multiple ditches] are the remains of the Hypocausta or baths — the supposed cemetery of the station — and, what is rather a variety in antiquarian researches, the perfect remains of a Roman middenstead, which, strange as it may appear, has furnished many loads of excellent manure to the neighbouring fields, and been hitherto the productive mine of several interesting curiosities.

— Thomas Sopwith

The fort was surveyed by R. G. Collingwood and described by him in his Archaeology of Roman Britain, 1930, where he noted the fort's uniquely skewed shape and extraordinary set of defensive ramparts on the western, uphill side. It is the highest stone-built Roman fort in Britain. Pottery excavated in the 1950s suggested that the fort was constructed in 122 AD, at the same time as Hadrian's Wall. A survey in 2007–8 by English Heritage showed a large Roman civilian settlement or vicus to the north and west of the fort. Artefacts found include coins, pottery, glass, objects made of jet, and inscribed stones. In 2012, the University of Durham carried out a geophysics survey. In the absence of a full excavation, archaeologists have exploited the diggings of moles to uncover Roman artefacts by sifting earth thrown up by the animals in their molehills. Finds include fragments of terra sigillata (Samian ware, Roman table pottery); rim fragments of serving bowls and earthenware pots; a bead made of jet; some iron nails; and a bronze dolphin from the bath house, most likely the handle of an instrument like a strigil or razor.

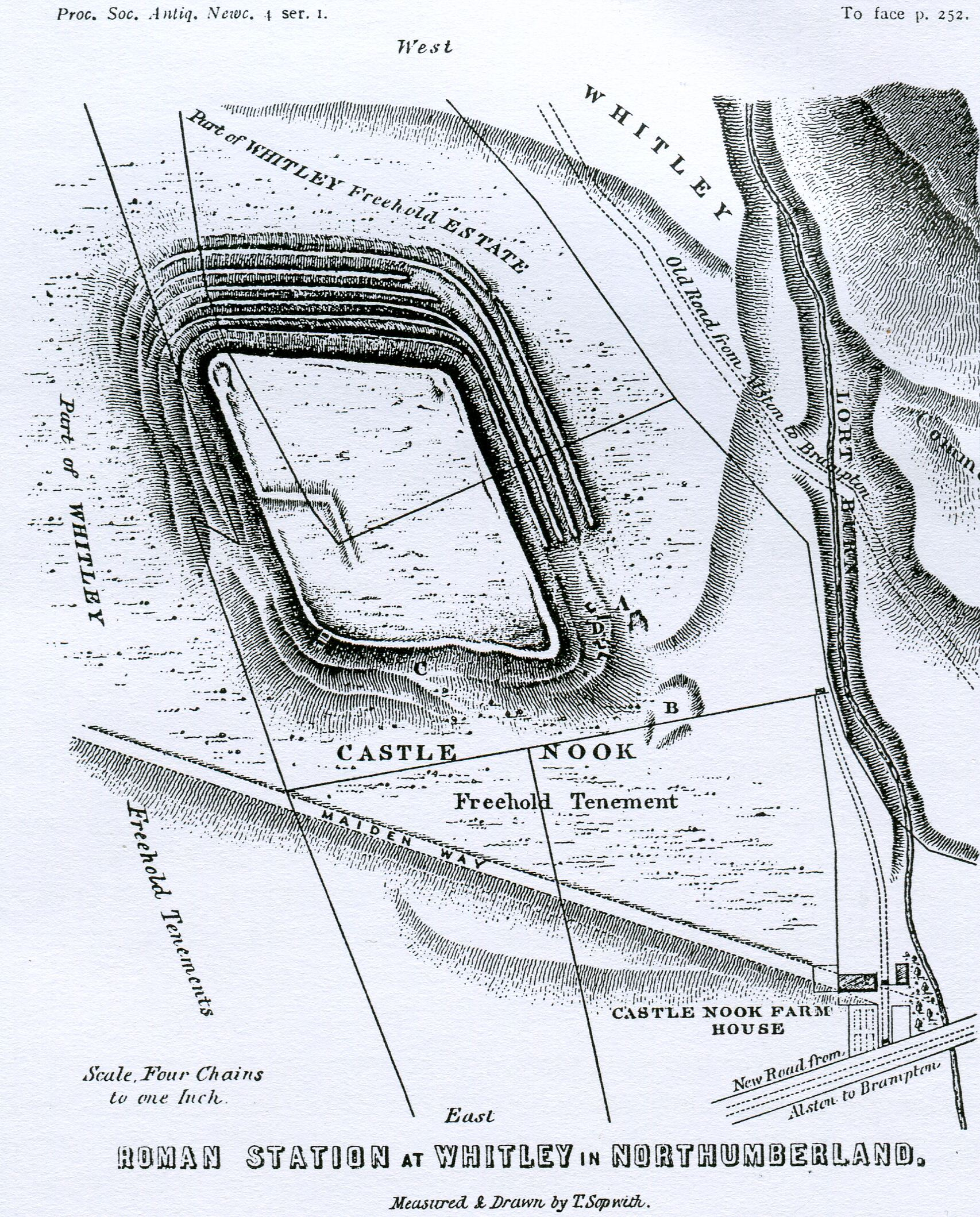
Plan of Whitley Castle by Thomas Sopwith, 1853. The Victorian enclosure walls shown within the Roman fort were largely removed by volunteers in 2018.

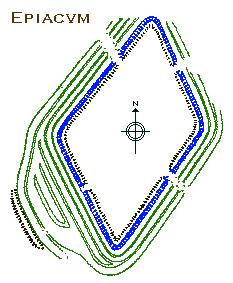
Plan, made by R. G. Collingwood in 1930, shows the unique skewing of the playing-card shape of Roman forts, and the similarly extraordinary set of ramparts outside the fort's wall.

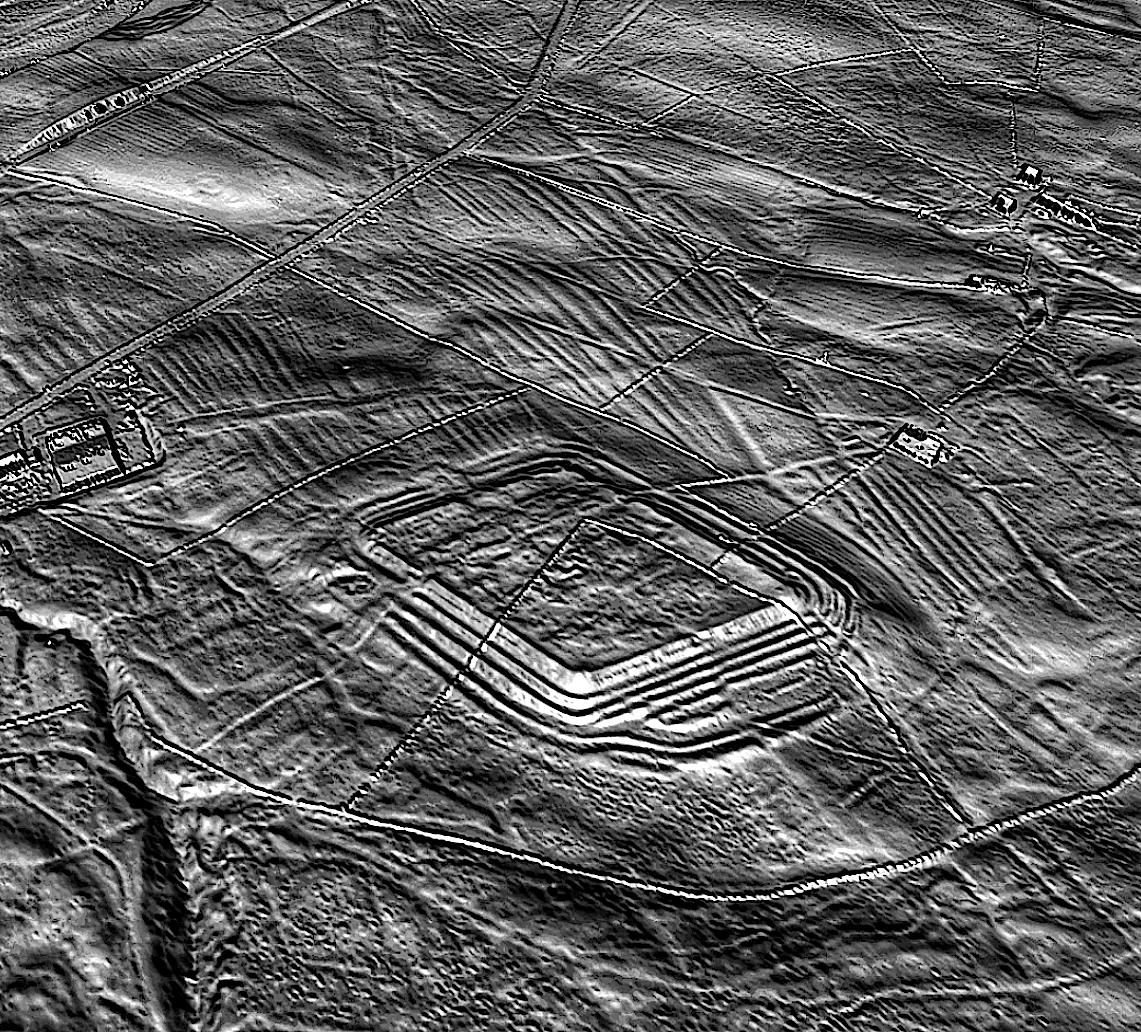
A lidar view

== Conservation and access ==
The site is on the privately owned Castle Nook Farm, and is a Scheduled Ancient Monument. In 2012 the not-for-profit company Epiacum Heritage Ltd. secured a grant of £49,200 from the Heritage Lottery Fund to develop a programme of events for the fort to include a website, guided tours for the public, archaeology survey days for volunteers and educational events for schools. Epiacum Heritage and Castle Nook Farm later received a grant from a DEFRA-funded "Farming in Protected Landscapes" programme to fund a new visitor trail and enhanced interpretation. The new permissive access route starts at the South Tyne Trail. The Roman fort can be visited for free during daylight hours. There is a new car park and café below the fort on the west side of the A689 road. Visitors should note that the large sign for the site reads 'Epiacum' and not 'Whitley Castle'.

== Sources ==
- Historic England (2007). "Whitley Castle Roman Fort (13725)". Research records (formerly PastScape).
- Robertson, Alastair F. (2007). Whitley Castle; Epiacum: A Roman Fort near Alston in Cumbria (3rd ed.). Hundy. ISBN 978-0-954-73394-0.
- Went, Dave; Ainsworth, Stewart (2009), Whitley Castle, Tynedale, Northumberland: An Archaeological Investigation of the Roman Fort and its Setting (PDF), Research Department Report Series, English Heritage, ISSN 1749-8775
