= Trevor Rowley =

Archaeologist

Richard Trevor Rowley (born 25 May 1942) is an English landscape historian and archaeologist known for his work on the Welsh Marches, Oxfordshire and the medieval landscape. He was a founder fellow of Kellogg College, Oxford (1990) and is now dean of degrees and emeritus fellow of Kellogg College.

== Education ==
Rowley was educated at the Priory Grammar School for Boys, Shrewsbury,(1953–1960), University College London (1960–1963) and Linacre College, Oxford (1964–1966).

Trevor Rowley was a postgraduate student under the landscape historian W. G. Hoskins at Oxford University.

== Teaching career ==
After a short period teaching at a teacher training college in Birmingham, where Rowley also worked as a part-time tutor for the Birmingham University Extra-Mural Department, he returned to Oxford in 1969. He was the first Staff Tutor in Archaeology and Local Studies, in what was then the Delegacy for Extra Mural Studies, based at Rewley House. During his time as Staff Tutor, later Director of Archaeology, he developed an archaeology programme, including conferences, professional training and excavations. From 1990 to 2000 he was the Deputy Director of what had by then become the Oxford University Department for Continuing Education. During this time he was responsible for several initiatives, including collaboration with the Open University on award-bearing courses, which eventually led to the department offering the part-time postgraduate degrees, the first part-time qualification provided by Oxford University. He was also responsible for creating the Oxford Experience based at Christ Church, Oxford, a summer school programme that runs over six weeks each year, and on which he still teaches.

In 2000 Rowley took early retirement to concentrate on full-time writing and lecturing. For many years he was a guest lecturer for Swan Hellenic Cruises and Voyages to Antiquity.

== Role in professional organisations ==
Rowley was elected a Fellow of the Society of Antiquaries in 1973 and between 1976 and 1979 he was Honorary Secretary of the Council for British Archaeology.

== Research ==
Rowley's current research work is on Norman landscapes and Edgar the Ætheling, the fourth 'king' of England in 1066. He is a trustee and co-director of the Appleton Area Archaeological Research Project, which is investigating the history and archaeology of his home village of Appleton in Oxfordshire.

== Selected publications ==
- The Shropshire Landscape, Hodder and Stoughton, 1972
- Landscape Archaeology, David and Charles, 1974 (with Mick Aston)
- Villages in the Landscape, J M Dent and Sons, 1978
- The High Middle Ages, Routledge, 1984
- The Landscape of the Welsh Marches, Michael Joseph, 1986
- Norman England, 1997
- The Normans, The History Press, 1999. Pegasus Press (USA), 2021
- The 20th Century English Landscape, Continuum, 2006
- The Man Behind the Bayeux Tapestry, History Press, 2013
- An Archaeological Study of The Bayeux Tapestry, Pen and Sword Books, 2016
