= Colworth House =

Listed building in Bedfordshire, England

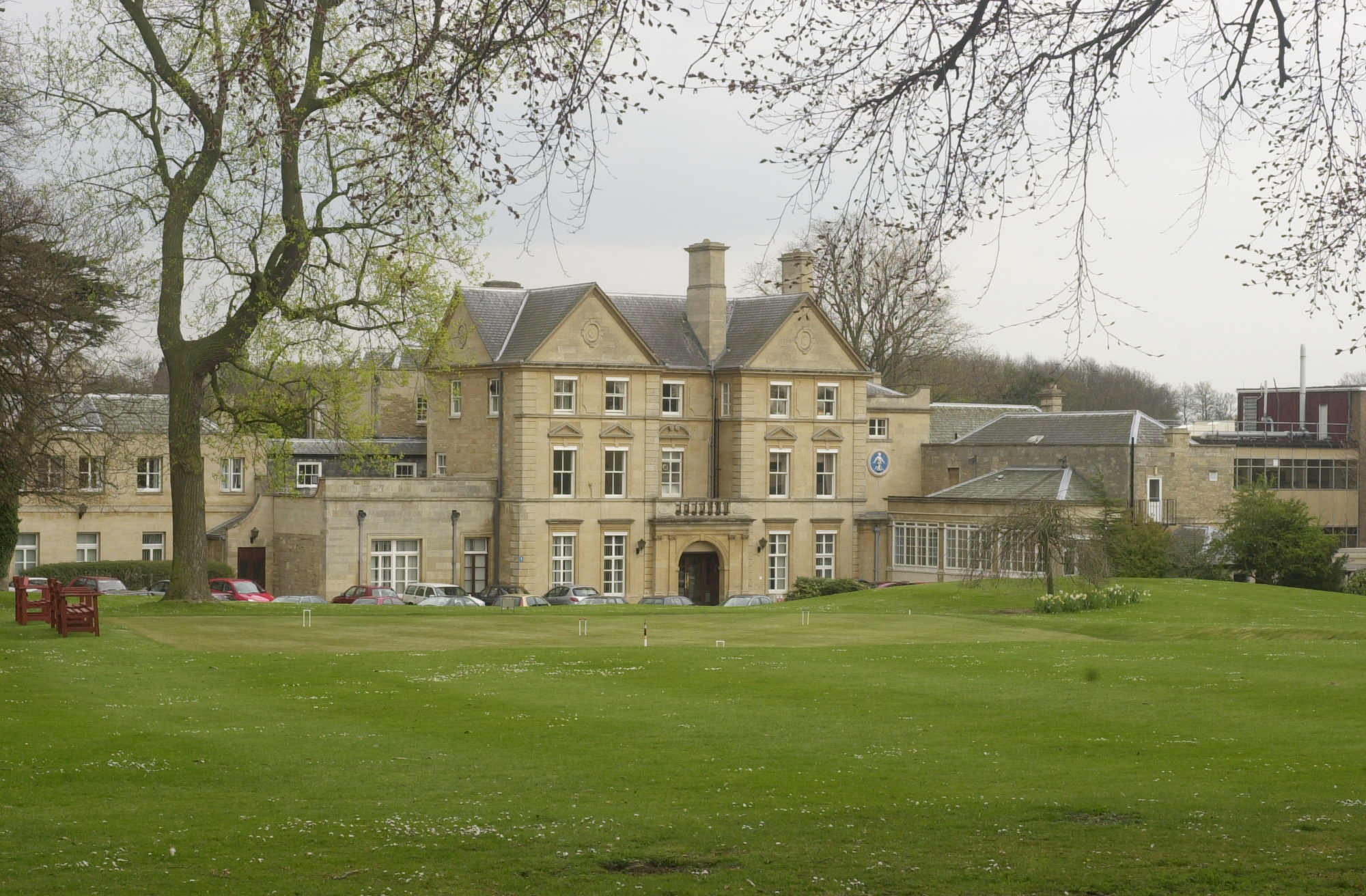
- Colworth House in 2007

- Location within Bedfordshire

General information
- Type: Manor house/Science park
- Location: Sharnbrook, Bedfordshire, England
- Coordinates: 52.23053°N 0.56505°W
- Ordnance Survey: SP9810060108
- Construction started: 1715
- Client: Mark Antonie
- Owner: Wrenbridge

Listed Building – Grade II*
- Official name: Colworth House
- Designated: 7 May 1952
- Reference no.: 1160878

Colworth House is an 18th-century mansion set in an area of parkland on the edge of the village of Sharnbrook in Bedfordshire, England. It is a Grade II* listed building.

== History ==
The surrounding site has been occupied since prehistoric times. The current house was started in 1715 by Mark Antonie, a self-made man who aspired to become part of the landed gentry. In 1760, Richard Antonie inherited the house and bought a slave back to the house from Jamaica. It passed down to John Antonie, who bequeathed it on his death to a cousin, the MP William Lee, who then adopted the additional surname of Antonie. On his own death in 1815, William Lee Antonie left it to his nephew, the astronomer and antiquarian John Fiott, who thereupon adopted the surname of Lee.

The house and extensive grounds were acquired in 1935 by Henry Mond, 2nd Baron Melchett and subsequently sold to Unilever in November 1947, who restored and developed them into a research laboratory through 1948, with the first staff moving in during 1950. Unilever employed up to 1,100 people at Colworth during the 1990s.

In 2004 Unilever entered into a joint venture with property investment company Arlington Securities to manage Colworth Science Park, with the aim of turning it into a science cluster by attracting science businesses, academic outposts, and science-based entrepreneurs. Arlington was subsequently acquired by Goodman, a property group involved in long-term ownership, development, and management of commercial and industrial property. In 2015 the joint venture vehicle was acquired by Palmer Capital and Wrenbridge Land. Colworth Science Park remains one of Unilever's six research centres located around the world with around 750 Unilever employees. An additional 200 personnel are employed by several small companies located on the site.

The Colworth House grounds were the location of a Channel 4 Time Team programme, first broadcast on 22 February 2009. Numerous finds by amateur archaeologists led to the discovery of a Roman villa and farm in a field adjacent to the property.

Colworth House has also given its name to the Colworth Medal, established by the late Professor Tony James of Unilever Research and Professor Henry Arnstein of the Biochemical Society in 1963. The award recognises outstanding research by a young biochemist of any nationality who has carried out the majority of their work in the UK.

== See also ==
- Grade II* listed buildings in Bedfordshire
