= Allasdale =

Coordinates: 57.001°N 7.502°W

Allasdale: Scottish Gaelic: Athalasdal
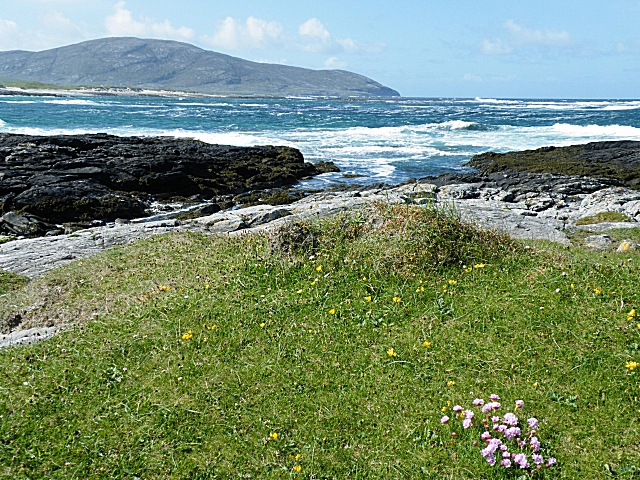
- Machair, close to the sea at Allasdale, has Bird's Foot Trefoil and Thrift to provide some colour

- Location within the Outer Hebrides
- Population: 4
- Language: Scottish Gaelic; English
- OS grid reference: NF660034
- Civil parish: Barra
- Council area: Na h-Eileanan Siar
- Lieutenancy area: Western Isles
- Country: Scotland
- Sovereign state: United Kingdom
- Post town: ISLE OF BARRA
- Postcode district: HS9
- Dialling code: 01871
- Police: Scotland
- Fire: Scottish
- Ambulance: Scottish
- UK Parliament: Na h-Eileanan an Iar
- Scottish Parliament: Na h-Eileanan an Iar

Allasdale (Scottish Gaelic: Athalasdal, pronounced [ˈa.əl̪ˠəs̪t̪əl̪ˠ]) is a settlement on Barra in the Outer Hebrides, Scotland. The settlement is also within the parish of Barra, and is situated on the A888 which is the island's circular main road.

== History ==
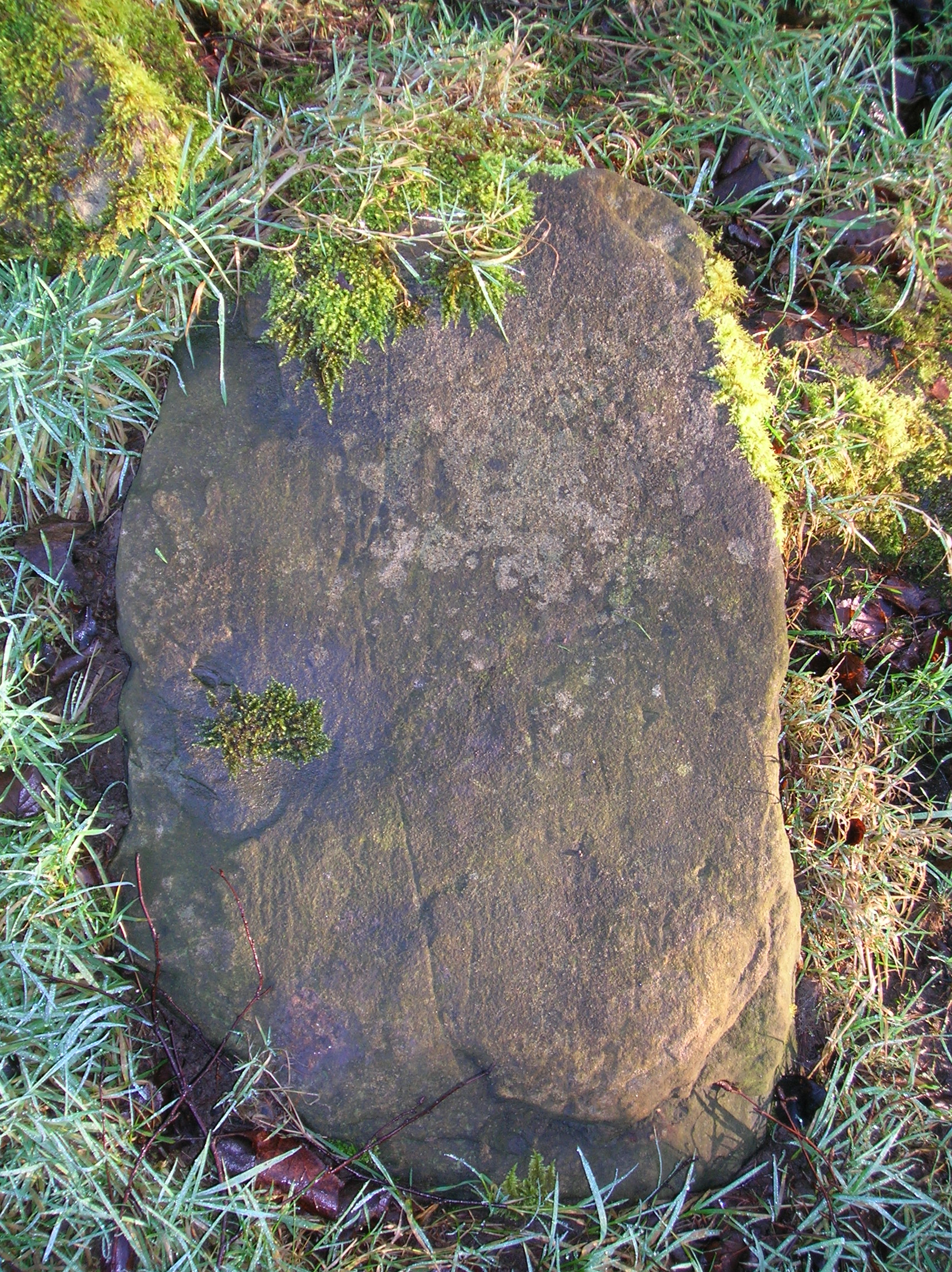
Bronze Age plough marks

In May 2007 Channel 4's archaeological television programme Time Team investigated some prehistoric remains that had first been partly exposed when storms in October 2005 had blown away some sand dunes. The site had been previously investigated in 2006 by a rescue survey funded by Historic Scotland.

Among the remains found were Bronze Age cist burials and plough-marks, and a hamlet of Iron Age roundhouses and a wheelhouse on a par with those at Skara Brae on the Orkney Isles. The programme featuring Allasdale was first broadcast on 20 January 2008, as part of Series 15 of Time Team.
