= Raksha Dave =

Archaeologist and television presenter

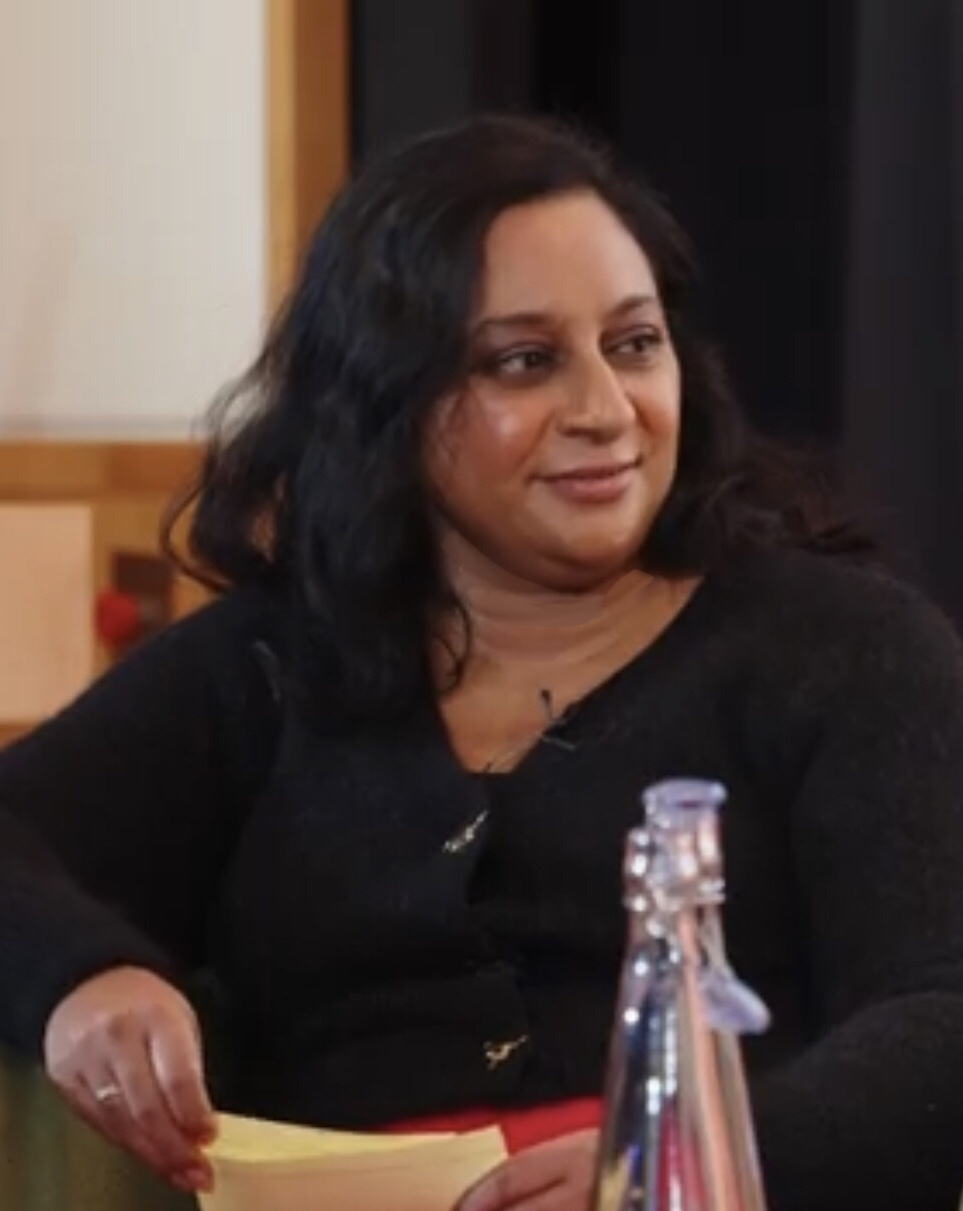
- Dave at the British Library in 2024
- Occupations: Archaeologist; TV presenter; author
- Known for: Time Team; Digging for Britain

Academic background
- Education: University College London

Academic work
- Institutions: Museum of London Archaeology Service; Pitt Rivers Museum

Raksha Dave is an archaeologist, TV presenter and the current president of the Council for British Archaeology.

== Early life and education ==
Dave is from Lancashire. She graduated with a degree in Archaeology from the UCL Institute of Archaeology in 1999.

== Career ==
Dave worked with a commercial archaeological unit, primarily excavating in London with the Museum of London Archaeology Service. She also excavated at the World Heritage Site of Catalhoyuk in Turkey, and sites in Texas and Puerto Rico. She featured regularly on Time Team between 2003 and 2013 as a field archaeologist. She was a presenter on season 7 of Digging for Britain, broadcast in 2018. She presented the BBC Learning Zone Ancient Voices programme on prehistory, broadcast in 2015, and co-presented Pompeii’s Final Hours: New Evidence for Channel 5. Other TV work includes The Bone Detectives (2020) and Digging Up Britain's Past (2020). In 2023, Dave and Xand van Tulleken co-hosted a 3-part docuseries for Channel 5, The Vikings. In 2025, Dave appeared with Sandi Toksvig on a 4-part Channel 4 series called Hidden Wonders.

Dave is an advocate for increasing the diversity of archaeologists, was a trustee for the Council for British Archaeology (CBA) and is a patron of its Young Archaeologists Club. In July 2021 CBA announced that she had taken up the three-year presidency of the organisation. In 2023, she published a book aimed at children called Lessons from our Ancestors; this uses the stories of fifty objects to explore lessons of equality, inclusion and sustainability. This book was the winner of the 'Discover' category at the British Book Awards in 2024.

She was a founding member of the archaeological social-enterprise DigVentures. In 2014, she was the organisation's field school manager.

Dave is a research affiliate of the Pitt Rivers Museum, University of Oxford.

== Personal life ==
In April 2017, Dave married Nigel Jeffries, an expert in medieval and post-medieval pottery at the Museum of London.
