= Mick Aston =

English archaeologist (1946–2013)

Mick Aston FSA
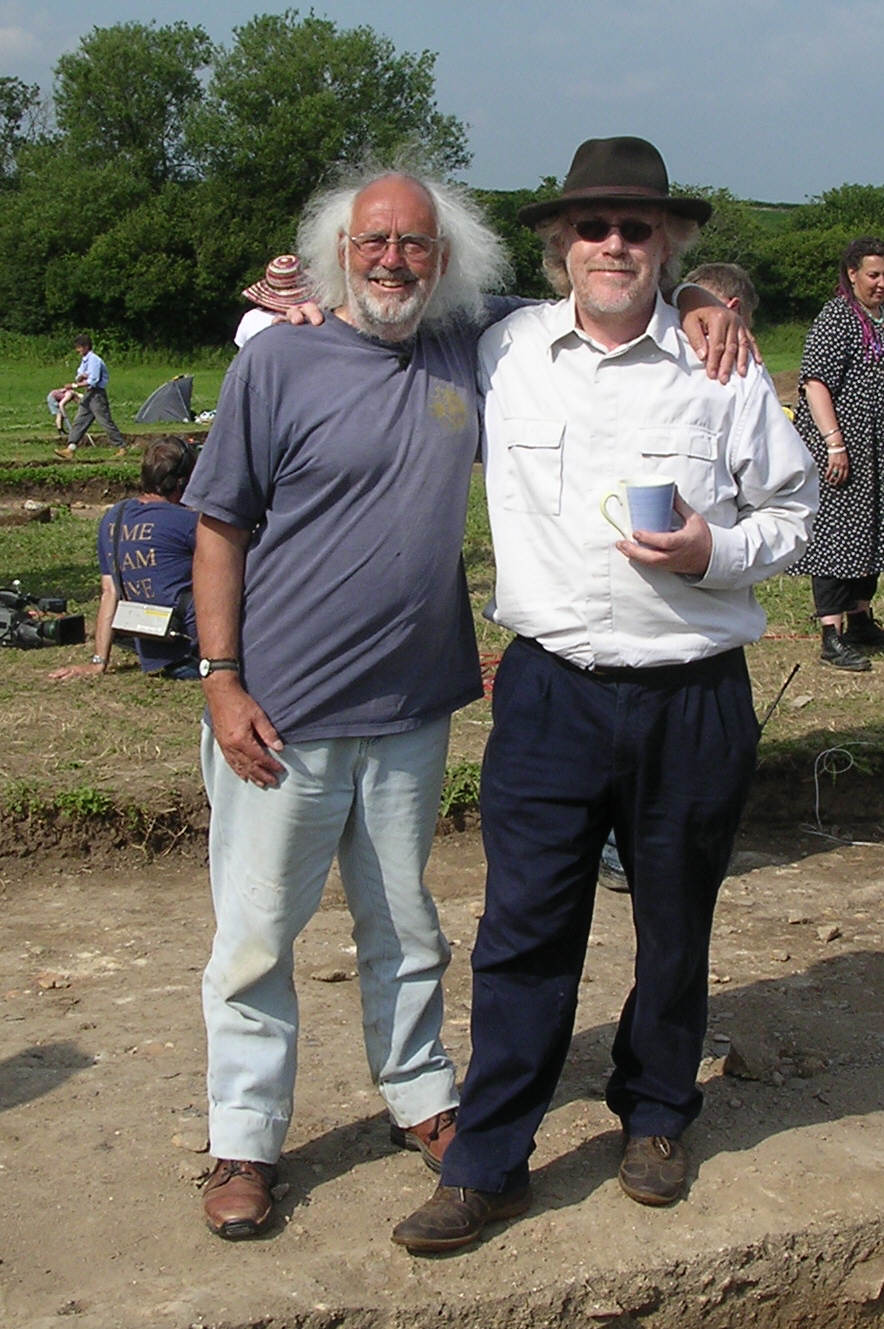
- Aston (left) at the Time Team Big Roman Dig in 2005 with the programme's originator and producer, Tim Taylor
- Born: Michael Antony Aston; 1 July 1946; Oldbury, Worcestershire, England
- Died: 24 June 2013 (aged 66); Winscombe, Somerset, England
- Occupation: Archaeologist
- Years active: 1970–2013
- Known for: Time Team (1994–2013)

Michael Antony Aston FSA (1 July 1946 – 24 June 2013) was an English archaeologist who specialised in Early Medieval landscape archaeology. Over the course of his career, he lectured at both the University of Bristol and University of Oxford and published fifteen books on archaeological subjects. A keen populariser of the discipline, Aston was widely known for appearing as the resident academic on the Channel 4 television series Time Team from 1994 to 2011.

Born in Oldbury, Worcestershire, to a working-class family, Aston developed an early interest in archaeology, studying it as a subsidiary to geography at the University of Birmingham. In 1970, he began his career working for the Oxford City and County Museum and there began his work in public outreach by running extramural classes in archaeology and presenting a series on the subject for Radio Oxford. In 1974, he was appointed the first County Archaeologist for Somerset, there developing an interest in aerial archaeology and establishing a reputation as a pioneer in landscape archaeology—a term that he co-invented with Trevor Rowley—by authoring some of the earliest books on the subject. In 1978 he began lecturing at the University of Oxford and in 1979 became a tutor at the University of Bristol, supplementing these activities by working as an archaeological tour guide in Greece.

In 1988, Aston teamed up with television producer Tim Taylor and together they created two shows which focused on bringing archaeology into British popular consciousness. The first was the short-lived Time Signs (1991), followed by the more successful Time Team, which was produced for Channel 4 from 1994 to 2013. Aston was responsible for identifying sites for excavation and for selecting specialists to appear on the show, and through the programme became well known to the viewing public for his trademark colourful jumpers and flowing, untidy hairstyle. In 1996 he was appointed to the specially-created post of Professor of Landscape Archaeology at Bristol University, and undertook a ten-year project investigating the manor at Shapwick, Somerset.

He retired from his university posts in 2004, but continued working on Time Team until 2011 and in 2006 commenced writing regular articles for British Archaeology magazine until his death. Although Aston did not believe that he would leave a significant legacy behind him, after his death various archaeologists claimed that he had a major impact in helping to popularise the discipline among the British public.

== Biography ==
=== Early life and education: 1946–1969 ===
Aston was born on 1 July 1946 into a working-class family in Oldbury, Worcestershire, to cabinet-maker Harold Aston and his wife Gladys. He developed an early interest in archaeology, although teachers at Oldbury Grammar School attempted to dissuade him from pursuing it. His father gave him two books on archaeology as a Christmas present, and he subsequently spent much time visiting archaeological sites, sometimes playing truant to do so. The first of his family to attend university, Aston studied geography at the University of Birmingham, albeit with a subsidiary in archaeology, graduating in 1967. He taught himself more about archaeology by enrolling in various excavations, and was influenced by such figures as his thesis supervisor Harry Thorpe, as well as the geographer Trevor Rowley and archaeologists Philip Rahtz and Philip Barker. His dissertation was on the development of settlement in the West Penwith peninsula in Cornwall.

=== Early career: 1970–1987 ===
Aston first gained full-time employment in 1970, working as a field officer at the Oxford City and County Museum in Oxfordshire. For a time living in a tent, he worked on the sites and monuments record and taught several extramural classes while based at the museum. This extramural teaching fitted closely with Aston's staunch belief that archaeology should be open to all who were interested in it. As part of this devotion to public outreach, he presented a radio series on archaeology that was broadcast on Radio Oxford. In 1974 he moved to Taunton to become the first County Archaeologist for Somerset, where he set up a new site record and oversaw the excavation of sites revealed by the construction of the M5 motorway. Again he also taught extramural adult education classes, this time for the University of Bristol. It was here that he developed a passion for aerial archaeology, and would often charter private planes in order to undertake aerial photography. Becoming a pioneer of landscape archaeology, along with Trevor Rowley he was responsible for coining the term in their 1974 book, Landscape Archaeology. With archaeologist James Bond he authored The Landscape of Towns (1976), in which he extended his use of landscape archaeology to urban areas. Recognising his contribution to the discipline, in 1976, he was elected a Fellow of the Society of Antiquaries of London.

Tiring of his position as county archaeologist, finding it "too safe, pensionable and superannuable", in 1978 he returned to Oxfordshire to take up a temporary position as a tutor in archaeology and local studies at Oxford University's External Studies Department. That year he co-ran his first study tour to Greece with Peter Hardy; he would continue to run these annually for a number of years, most often visiting Santorini. In 1979 he returned to the West Country as tutor in archaeology at the University of Bristol's Extra-Mural Department, through which he organised weekend and evening courses throughout the region, introducing thousands of interested people to archaeology. During this period he also authored Interpreting the Landscape (1985).

=== Founding Time Team: 1988–1995 ===
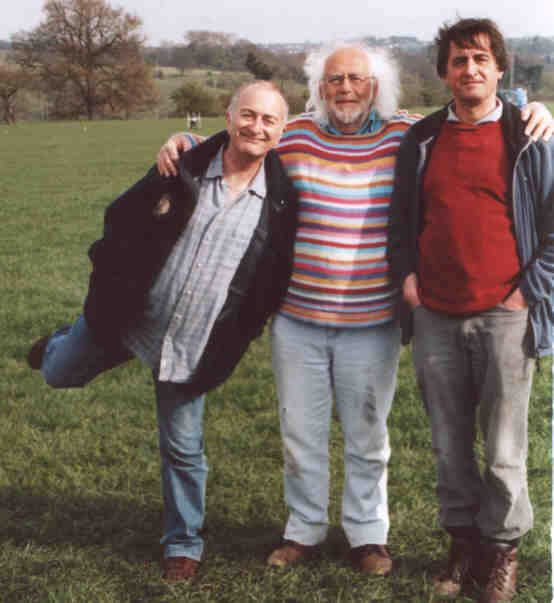
Aston (centre) with presenter Sir Tony Robinson (left) and Roman expert Guy de la Bédoyère (right) during a Time Team dig

In June 1988 the producer Tim Taylor invited Aston to work on a new four-episode television series for Channel 4 called Time Signs, broadcast in June and July 1991. The series focused on the historical development of the area about to be flooded by the Roadford Reservoir in Devon, making heavy use of archaeological data. Aston brought archaeologist Phil Harding into the project in order to explain techniques of experimental archaeology to the audience. Meanwhile, in August 1989, Aston was promoted to the position of Reader in Landscape Archaeology at Bristol University. He also continued to write on the subject, authoring the book Monasteries (1993); he had initially planned to title the volume Monasteries in the Landscape but his publisher, Batsford, had insisted on the shorter title.

Aston and Taylor subsequently decided to work together on a new archaeological television series, devising the format for Time Team. Whilst Taylor organised the film production side of the project with Channel 4, Aston located suitable sites to excavate, and gathered together a team of specialists to appear on the show, among them field archaeologists Harding and Carenza Lewis, artist Victor Ambrus, and historian Robin Bush. He knew the actor and television presenter Tony Robinson after they had met on an archaeological course in Greece, and successfully requested that he present the show. From an early stage, they had agreed that every episode would feature a practical process or a re-enactment alongside the field archaeology.

Time Team was first broadcast in 1994, and would attract around four million viewers per episode, with Aston becoming "an icon to the viewing public." Writing in The Guardian, Christopher Dyer noted that Aston's "unkempt hair and beard, multicoloured sweaters and Black Country accent made him instantly recognisable" to the British public, describing him as "a popular success" who had attracted "a large public following". Aston acted as chief archaeological adviser to the programme until the end of series nineteen, appearing in almost every episode, although he would later comment that when it first started he had no idea it would continue for so long. Aston enjoyed working with the Time Team crew, commenting that they were "a great gang ... There are some real party people."

Aston saw Time Team as an extension of his work as an extramural tutor, telling a 2013 interviewer that it was "a way of reaching 3 million people rather than 30 people in the village hall." Commenting on the popularity of Time Team, and its role in exposing the British public to archaeology, in a 2010 interview Aston remarked that "My motive was to get as many people as possible interested in archaeology, because we [in the profession] all enjoy it and think it interesting. That was my personal aim ... and on that basis I think it is a success." Time Team encouraged wider public interest in archaeology and led to increasing numbers of students applying to study archaeological courses at British universities, while subscriptions to Current Archaeology magazine quadrupled to 18,000 in the show's first five years. In autumn 1998, Channel 4 started a Time Team fan club, which had 16,000 members within a few months, while Aston became a supporter of the Council for British Archaeology's Young Archaeologists' Club (YAC), and with Harding gave regular talks to YAC branches. Aston found himself giving up to 20 public lectures a year on the subject of Time Team, describing the public feedback as "embarrassingly encouraging".

=== Professorship: 1996–2011 ===
In 1996, Aston was appointed to the position of Professor of Landscape Archaeology at Bristol University's Department of Continuing Education, a post designed explicitly for him. In 1998 the post was moved to the Centre for the Historic Environment within the Department of Archaeology. He would subsequently be instrumental in setting up the master's degree in archaeology and screen media at the department. By 1996, Aston was feeling "a bit frustrated" with Time Team, primarily because he was always "number two" to Robinson. He proceeded to present his own six-episode series, Time Traveller, in which he explored various archaeological sites in the counties around Bristol. It was broadcast on HTV over July and August 1997, and gained the largest local audiences for its time slot.

The archaeology students of King Alfred's College, Winchester also participated in a 10-year project led by Aston to investigate the manor of Shapwick in Somerset. It became the "type site for the study of the development of medieval villages". Aston published the results of the project in The Shapwick Project, Somerset: A Rural Landscape Explored (2007), co-written with Christopher Gerrard, and this was followed by a more popular account of the project, Interpreting the English Village, in 2013.

Alongside his academic publications, Aston wrote two books on archaeology for a more general audience, both of which were published by Channel 4 Books as a spin-off from the Time Team television series. The first of these was Time Team's Timechester: A Companion to Archaeology, co-written with Carenza Lewis and Phil Harding and first published in 2000. Based around the fictional British town of Timechester, the book looks at how the settlement would have progressed from the Palaeolithic through to the modern day, and examines the remains that each period would have left behind in the archaeological record. This was followed in 2002 by Archaeology is Rubbish: A Beginner's Guide, which Aston co-wrote with Tony Robinson and dedicated to Harding. Archaeology is Rubbish describes a fictional excavation site in an ordinary suburban back garden, and discusses the evidence from different archaeological periods, the field methods and techniques used by the excavators, and the legal proceedings and problems that archaeologists in Britain face.

Aston retired from Bristol University in 2004, subsequently becoming Professor Emeritus. He was also appointed an Honorary Visiting Professor at the University of Exeter, University of Durham, and the University of Worcester. That year, the University of Winchester awarded him an honorary Doctor of Letters. In 2006 Aston began writing a regular column, "Mick's Travels", for the bimonthly journal British Archaeology, the publication of the Council for British Archaeology. In 2007, Worcester University awarded Aston an honorary doctorate; that same year a number of his colleagues released a festschrift in his honour entitled People and Places: Essays in Honour of Michael Aston.

=== Final years: 2012–2013 ===
In February 2012, it was reported that Aston had left Time Team. He explained his position to the Western Daily Press, stating that the show's producers had made a number of changes to the series without consulting him, and that in the process Time Team had been "dumbed down", something he considered bad for archaeology. He was annoyed that a number of archaeologists – including surveyor Stewart Ainsworth, small finds specialist Helen Geake and illustrator Victor Ambrus – had seen their roles diminished while a new co-presenter, Mary-Ann Ochota, had been introduced, and that as a result the episodes now contained "a lot of faffing about." In an interview with the magazine British Archaeology Aston said: "The time had come to leave. I never made any money out of it, but a lot of my soul went into it. I feel really, really angry about it."

"I've decided to quit Time Team because Channel 4 decided to alter the format. There is a lot less archaeological content and a lot more pratting about. I was the archaeological consultant but they decided to get rid of half the archaeological team, without consulting me. I think it has dumbed down."

— Aston, 2012

In July 2012, Aston received a lifetime achievement award at the British Archaeological Awards, with Bristol University's professor Mark Horton praising him for making "the past accessible to all". In October, Channel 4 announced that the twentieth series of Time Team would be its last as the show was being axed. In December, Aston signed a petition advocating his support for the revamp of the Somerset Rural Life Museum in Glastonbury, which was then seeking financial backers.

On 24 June 2013, it was announced that Aston had died unexpectedly of a brain haemorrhage at his home in Somerset. He had been due to receive an honorary doctorate from University College Dublin that September. Ralph Lee, head of Channel 4's factual programming, announced that they had been "terribly saddened" by the news, and that they were planning a "tribute night" to Aston consisting of Time Team episodes to be screened on More4 on 13 July.

== Selected works ==
Title	Year	Co-author(s)	Publisher	ISBN
Landscape Archaeology: An Introduction to Fieldwork Techniques on Post-Roman Landscapes	1974	Trevor Rowley	David and Charles	978-0715366707
The Landscape of Towns	1976, 2000 (revised ed.)	James Bond	Littlehampton Book Services	978-0460041942
Interpreting the Landscape: Landscape Archaeology in Local Studies	1985	–	Routledge	978-0713436501
Aspects of the Medieval Landscape of Somerset	1988	–	Somerset County Council	0-86183-129-2
The Rural Settlements of Medieval England: Studies Dedicated to Maurice Beresford and John Hurst	1989	David Austen, Christopher Dyer	Basil Blackwell	978-0631159032
Monasteries Monasteries in the Landscape (revised. ed.)	1993, 2000 (revised. ed.)	–	Batsford; The History Press (rev.)	978-0713467093; 978-0752414911 (rev.)
The Medieval Landscape of Wessex	1994	Carenza Lewis	Oxbow	978-0946897780
The Atlas of Archaeology	1998	Tim Taylor	Dorling Kindersley	978-0751303209
Mick's Archaeology	2000, 2002 (revised ed.)	–	Tempus; The History Press (rev)	978-0752414805
Time Team's Timechester	2000	Carenza Lewis, Phil Harding, and Tim Taylor	Channel 4	978-0752272184
Monastic Archaeology: Papers on the Study of Medieval Monasteries	2001	Graham Keevill, Teresa Hall	Oxbow	978-1842170298
Archaeology is Rubbish: A Beginner's Guide	2002	Tony Robinson	Channel 4	978-0752265193
Interpreting the Landscape from the Air	2002	–	NPI Media Group	978-0752425207
The Shapwick Project, Somerset: A Rural Landscape Explored	2007	Chris Gerrard	Maney	978-1905981861
Interpreting the English Village: Landscape and Community at Shapwick, Somerset	2013	Chris Gerrard	Windgather Press	978-1905119455

== Personal life ==
"Mick Aston was a great British eccentric; an atheist whose life's work was medieval monasticism, an anarchist who for many decades loyally fulfilled the labyrinthine requirements of his university and British television, and a grumpy old curmudgeon with the kindest of hearts and a great capacity for friendship ... His mission was sharing his passion for archaeology with ordinary people rather than keeping its secrets locked away behind the walls of Britain's universities."

— Tony Robinson, 2013

Aston was known for his "unfailing commitment and integrity", with his life being dominated by "old-fashioned idealism and loyalty". He was a vegetarian and a naturist, as well as an anarchist and an atheist. Describing himself as "a keen European", a friend of his noted that he "railed against right-wing politics, reserving special venom for Margaret Thatcher, and fought against all manner of authority, including university paperwork, and most especially if it came in a uniform."

His hobbies included gardening, pottery, astronomy, listening to classical music and cooking. He supported a number of charities and other causes, including Greenpeace, the Woodland Trust, Oxfam and Sightsavers International. He liked to live a private, hermit-like life, and once commented that "For some of the time I feel I could be a monk" but that he "couldn't cope with the celibacy." A self-described "solitary person", he found it somewhat annoying being a television celebrity and being recognised by members of the public.

Aston had a son, James, and a stepdaughter, Kathryn, both children of his former partner Carinne Allinson, from whom he separated in 1998. He later entered into a relationship with landscape historian Teresa Hall, who survived him on his death. He lived in what he called "a rather grotty '60s bungalow" in Somerset. When reporter Steve Eggington visited Aston's home in 2008, he noted that it was filled with "a labyrinth of books and maps, seemingly with different projects at different stages in each room."

Aston commented that throughout his life he suffered from poor health; he was afflicted with aspergillosis from the early 1980s, and was also asthmatic. He suffered a brain haemorrhage in March 2003, and was hospitalised for two weeks. The experience sent him into depression for eighteen months, during which time he read the autobiography of actress Jane Lapotaire, who had gone through the same experience, something which he believed aided his recovery more than anything else.

== Legacy ==
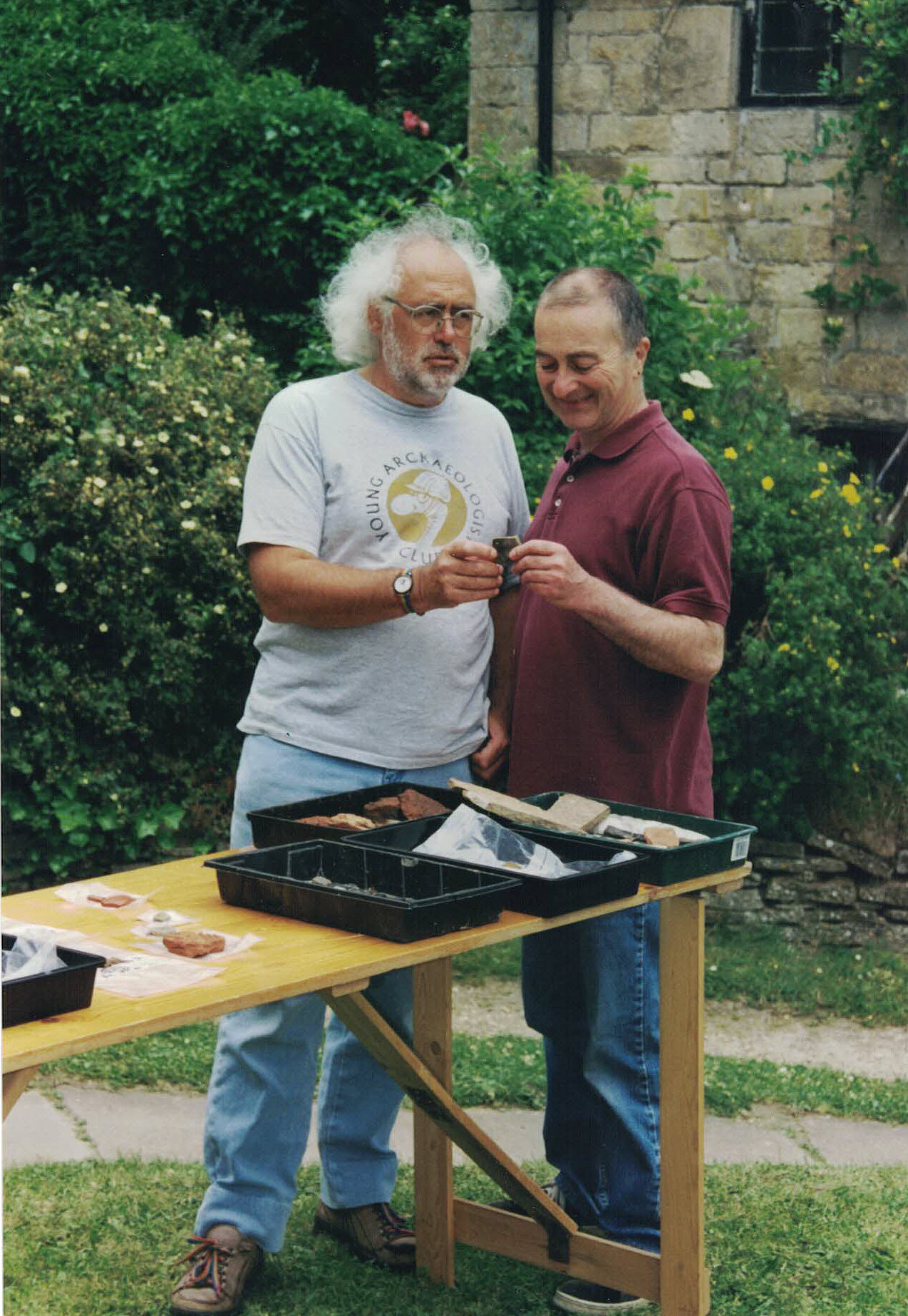
Mick Aston and Tony Robinson, Time Team series 8 shoot at Waltham Fields, Whittington, Gloucestershire, England, 2000

Aston did not believe that he would leave a significant legacy. He commented that this was the case because Britain's archaeological community had failed to develop the work that he had done with Time Team and with extramural teaching, and that all the public outreach he had accomplished would die with him. He felt that there was no "celebrity archaeologist" to replace him, and ultimately felt that the situation in British archaeology made him "angry and sad."

In British Archaeology magazine, Aston was described as "the Mortimer Wheeler of our times" because, despite strong differences between their personalities, both had done much to bring archaeology to the British public. It went on to note that Aston reminded archaeologists that "their job is to do archaeology, and if that was an archaeology that meant nothing to ordinary people, there was no point in it—and government would be among the first to notice." Two of Aston's colleagues from Bristol University, Stuart Prior and Mark Horton, commented that "Mick brought archaeology into the living rooms of half the nation, and left a legacy that will shape the discipline for decades to come." Writing for the website of Antiquity, Christopher Gerrard described him as "perhaps the best-known face in British archaeology", adding that "in so many different areas of medieval archaeology his legacy will live on." Emma McFarnon described Aston as "Somerset's premier archaeologist" in her obituary on the This is Somerset website.

Following Aston's death, former colleague Francis Pryor noted that Aston was a "remarkable archaeologist who could really dig", being a "warm, loving, nice man." Another colleague, Phil Harding, commented on Aston's "incredible knowledge" and "effortless way of making archaeology accessible to people." Tony Robinson wrote of him: "Mick was a real child of the '60s and a bit of a rebel, but he was also a series of contradictions. He was one of the best academic archaeologists in the country, yet his real love was teaching ordinary people. He was the grumpiest old Black Country curmudgeon you could imagine, but he had a heart of absolute gold." He also noted that "archaeology is now a subject that tens of thousands of people enjoy and value, and this is almost solely down to him." Ralph Lee, head of Channel 4's factual programming, described Aston as a "brilliant communicator" who helped make archaeology "so popular" in the UK.

=== Sculpture at Bristol University ===
A bronze bust of Mick Aston was unveiled at the University of Bristol on 26 March 2018. The bust, created by sculptor Alex Peter, has been installed at the Department of Anthropology and Archaeology in a ceremony that his former partner Teresa Hall and colleagues attended. Aston worked at the university for more than 25 years and was a familiar face on Time Team for 19 years. Sculptor Alex Peter said: "To acknowledge Aston for his academic contributions is a beautiful and a very meaningful thing." Fellow archaeologist Mark Horton stated: "Mick was such an amazing archaeologist in so many different ways."
