= Helen Geake =

British archaeologist

Helen Geake FSA
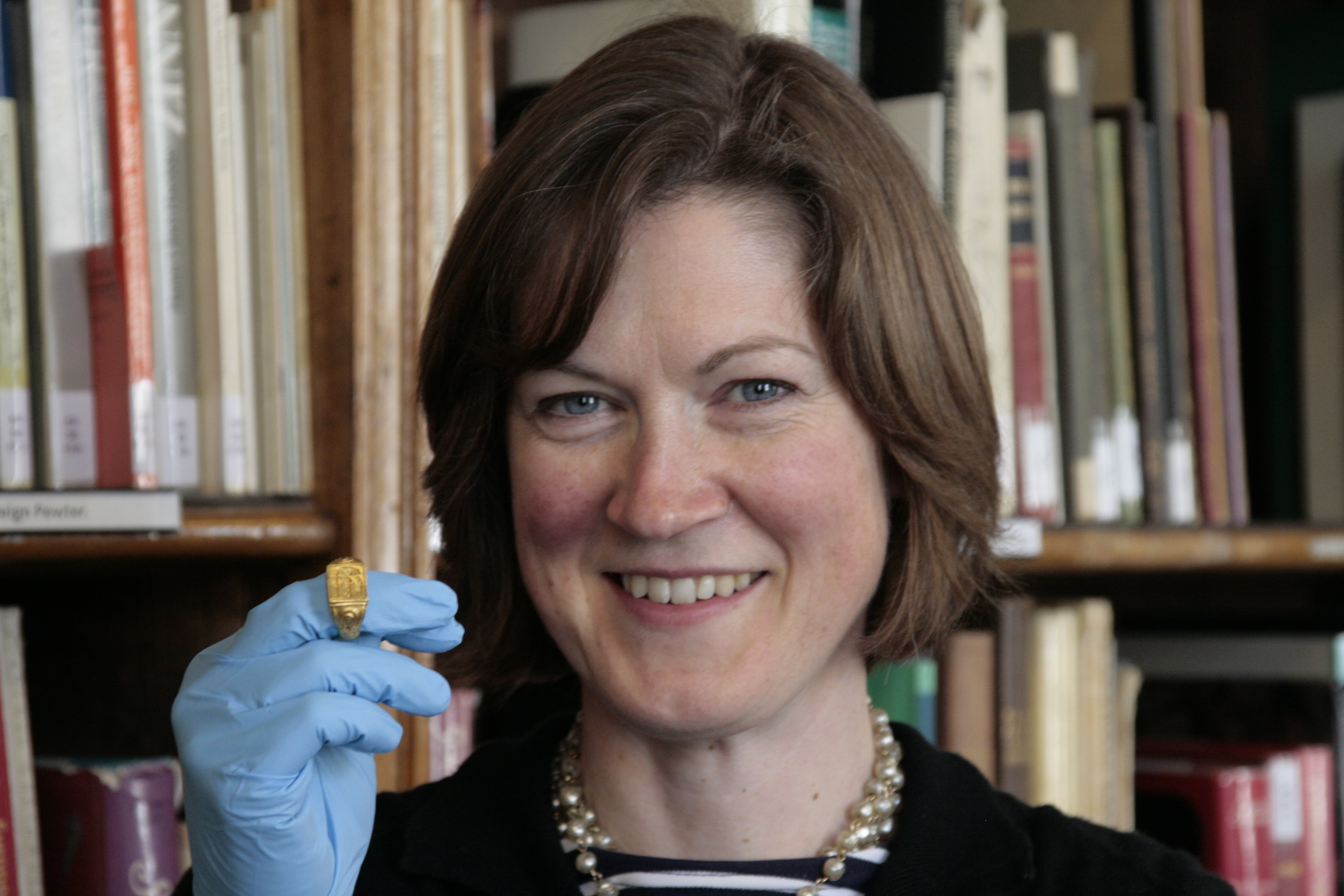
- Geake in 2012
- Born: 23 June 1967 (age 59); Wolverhampton, England

Academic background
- Education: University of York
- Thesis: The use of grave-goods in conversion-period England c.600–c.850 A.D. (1995)
- Doctoral advisor: Martin Carver

Academic work
- Institutions: Norwich Castle Museum; Portable Antiquities Scheme

Helen Mary Geake FSA (born 23 June 1967) is a British archaeologist and small finds specialist. She was one of the key members of Channel 4's long-running archaeology series Time Team.

== Early life and education ==
Geake was born in Wolverhampton in 1967 but grew up in Bath where she attended the private Royal High School Bath. She originally trained as a secretary. However, reading archaeology books and attending lectures by Mick Aston led her to study medieval archaeology at University College London. Subsequently, she took a DPhil at the University of York in Anglo-Saxon cemeteries contemporary with the spectacular ship burial at Sutton Hoo. Her thesis was titled "The use of grave-goods in conversion-period England c.600-c.850 A.D." and was submitted in 1995.

== Career ==
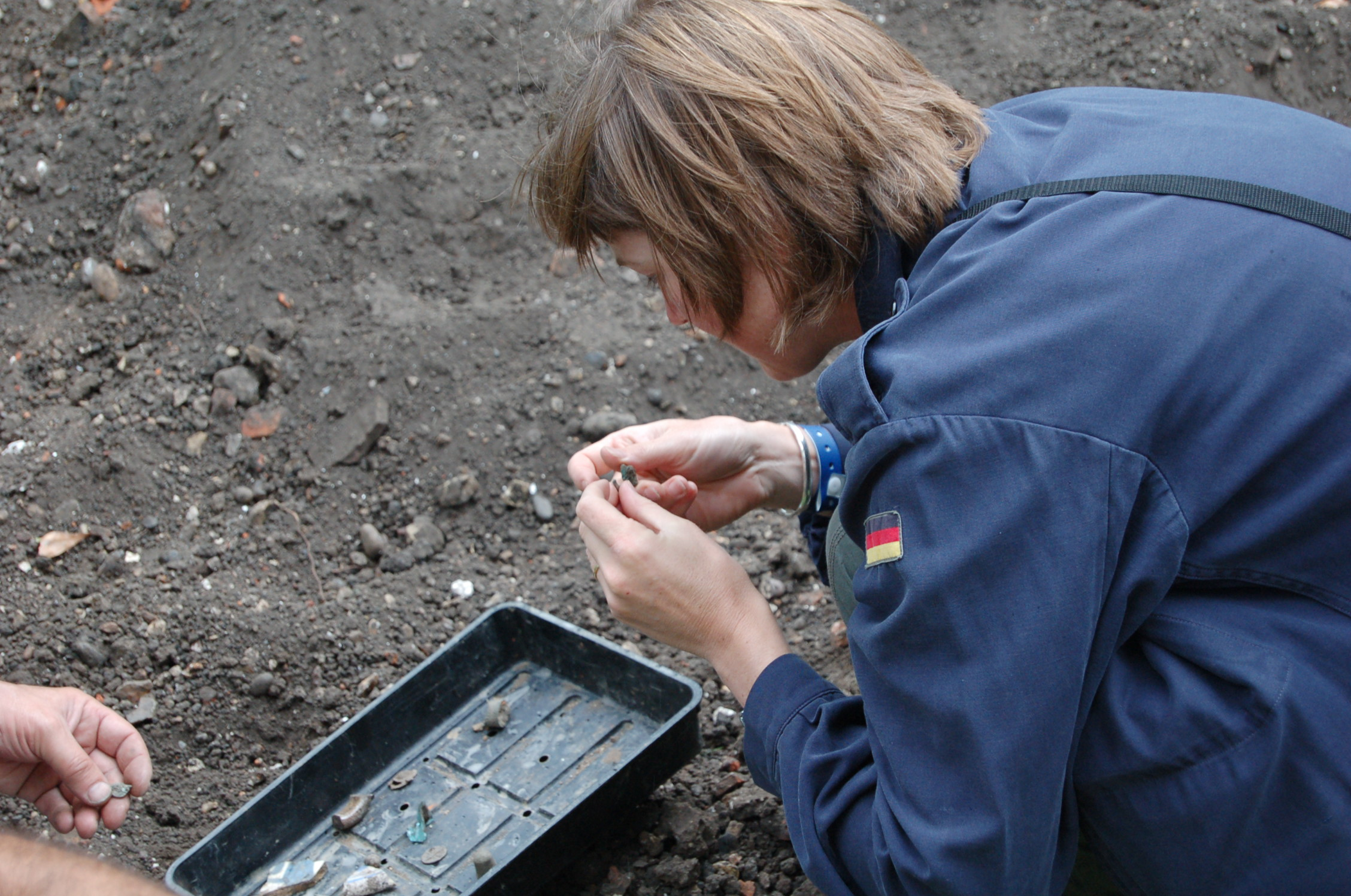
Geake looking at small finds during a Time Team: excavation in Lincoln's Inn Fields

After university she worked as assistant keeper of archaeology at Norwich Castle Museum before joining the Portable Antiquities Scheme, first as their finds liaison officer for Suffolk and then as finds adviser for post-Roman objects, based at Cambridge University. In 2014 she became the PAS's adviser to its voluntary finds recorders, based at the British Museum. As of 2024, she is the finds liaison officer for Norfolk and the PAS's early-medieval finds adviser.

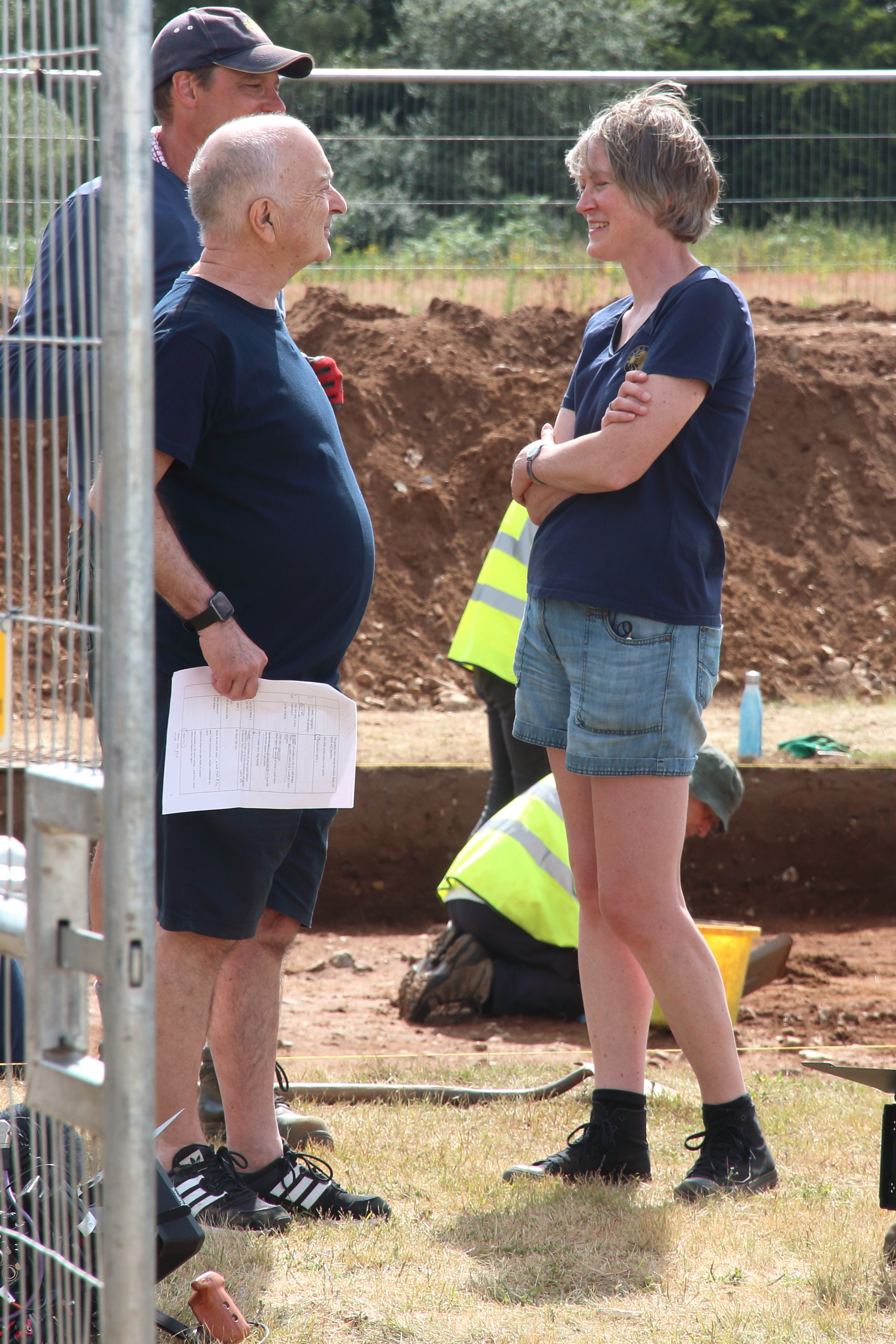
Helen Geake with Tony Robinson at Sutton Hoo June 2024

Geake is a member of the Department of Archaeology Advisory Board at the University of York and previously acted as a regional member of the Council of Rescue: The British Archaeological Trust.

In January 2003, she was elected a Fellow of the Society of Antiquaries of London.

=== Television ===
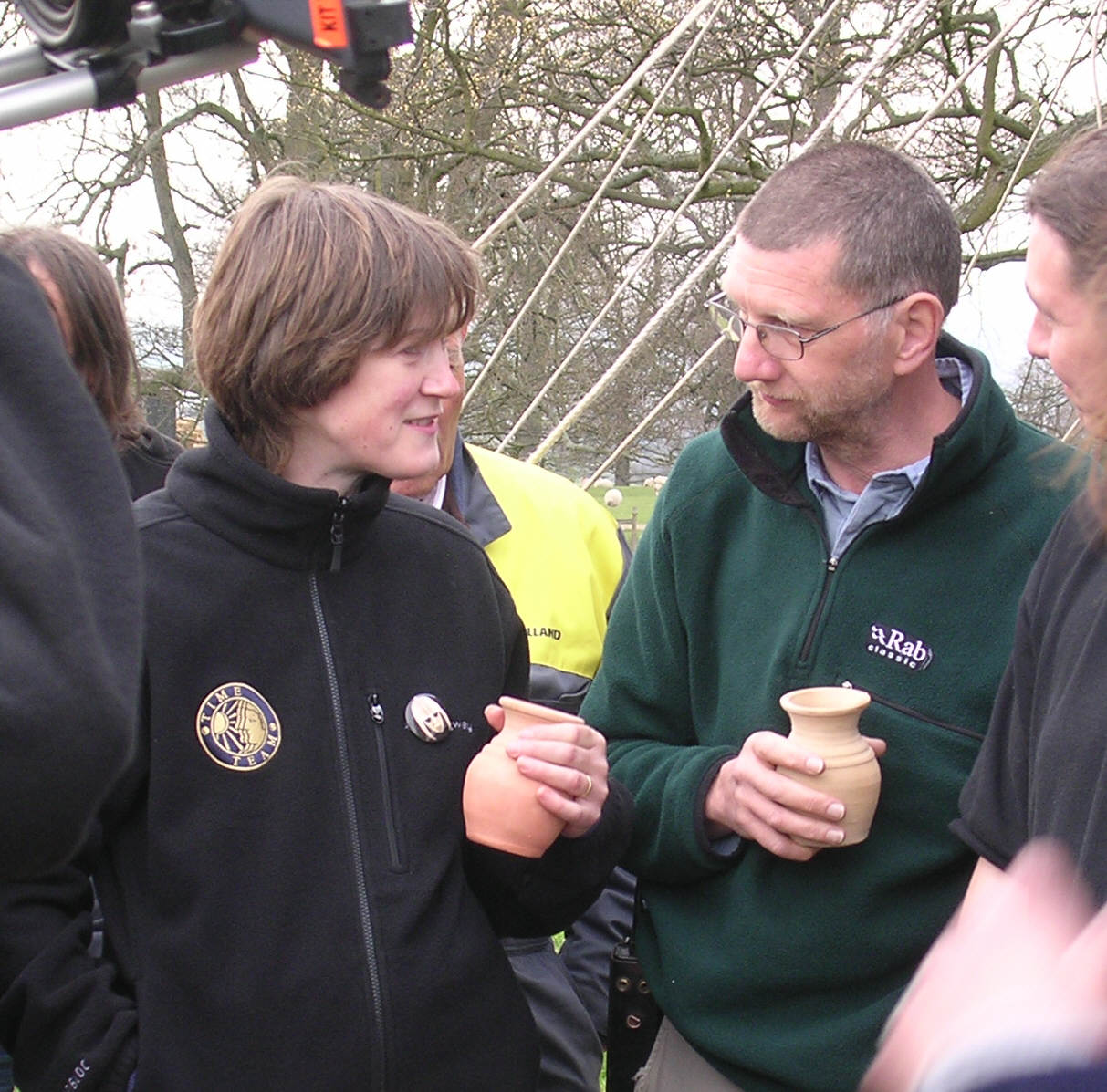
Geake with Stewart Ainsworth while filming an episode of Time Team in 2007

She first worked for Time Team in 1998 as a digger, and took part occasionally thereafter as an Anglo-Saxon specialist. She joined the frontline team of presenters, for the 2006 series and continued until 2010.

In 2012 Geake appeared in three episodes of Britain's Secret Treasures having previously appeared as an Anglo-Saxon specialist in National Geographic specials titled Saxon Gold: New Secrets Revealed (2011) and 'Saxon Gold: Finding the Hoard' (2010).

=== Politics ===
Geake stood for the Green Party in the Bury St Edmunds constituency at the 2015 General Election; she came fourth with 7.9 per cent of the vote. In the 2017 General Election she came fourth with 4.2 per cent of the vote. Geake was newly elected to the Mid Suffolk district council in the May 2019 elections; she was one of two Green party councillors for the Elmswell & Woolpit ward. She was again the Green candidate at the 2019 general election, where she polled 9,711 votes with 15.7 percent of the vote, an increase of 7,000 votes or 11.5% from the 2017 election. Geake did not seek re-election on Mid Suffolk district council in the May 2023 elections.

== Personal life ==
Geake is married to Angus Wainwright, the National Trust archaeologist for the East of England, with two sons and a daughter. She is a cousin of the late John E. Geake, after whom the asteroid 9298 Geake is named.

== Selected publications ==
- 'Burial Practice in Seventh- and Eighth-Century England' in Martin Carver (ed.), The Age of Sutton Hoo, Boydell Press, Woodbridge, 1992. ISBN 0851153305
- The Use of Grave Goods in conversion-Period England c.600-c.850, British Archaeological Reports, Oxford, 1997. ISBN 0-86054-917-8
- Geake, Helen (1999). "When Were Hanging Bowls Deposited in Anglo-Saxon Graves?" (PDF). Medieval Archaeology. 43: 1–18. doi:10.1080/00766097.1999.11735623.
- Early Deira: Archaeological Studies of the East Riding in the Fourth to Ninth Centuries AD (editor, with Jonathan Kenny), Oxbow Books, Oxford, 2000. ISBN 1-900188-90-2
- 'Persistent problems in seventh-century burial', in S. Lucy and A. Reynolds (eds.), Burial in Early Medieval England, Society for Medieval Archaeology Monograph 17, W.S. Maney and Son, London, 2002. ISBN 1-902653-65-3
- 'The control of burial practice in Anglo-Saxon England' in Martin Carver (ed.), The Cross Goes North: : Processes of Conversion in Northern Europe, AD 300–1300, York Medieval Press, 2003. ISBN 1-84383-125-2
