= Stewart Ainsworth =

British archaeological investigator

Stewart Ainsworth FSA MCIfA
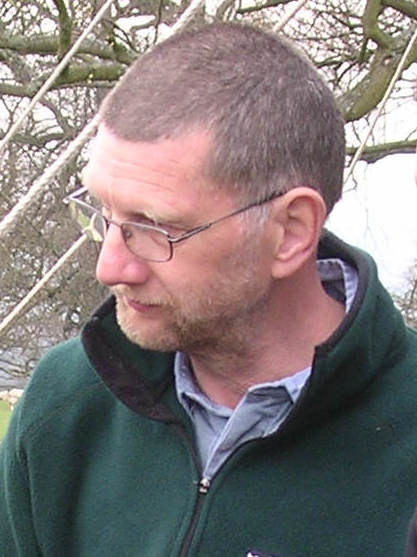
- Ainsworth during filming for Time Team, 2007
- Born: Stewart Ainsworth; 26 June 1951 (age 75); Morley, West Yorkshire, England
- Occupation: Archaeological investigator
- Known for: Time Team

Stewart Ainsworth FSA (born 26 June 1951) is a British archaeological investigator who was regularly seen on Time Team, the Channel 4 archaeological television series he joined in 1995. He has since appeared in more than two hundred episodes.

== Life and career ==
After reading, in his youth, a book about Horatio Nelson, 1st Viscount Nelson, and visiting the Tower of London, he formed an interest in the history of landscapes.

He trained as a surveyor before entering the Archaeology Division of the Ordnance Survey. In that role, he was responsible for updating the map depictions of many archaeological sites in Britain and abroad (notably on a number of Caribbean islands). In 1985, the OS Archaeology Division was incorporated into the Royal Commission on the Historical Monuments of England (which was itself incorporated into English Heritage in 1999), and Ainsworth relocated to Keele. He later moved to become Head of RCHME's Landscape Investigation Team (North), based in York, England.

He was affectionately called Time Team's "lumps and bumps" man by Professor Mick Aston, and works with the team alongside his day job, travelling the country surveying, recording and investigating archaeological sites. Regarding Time Team's potential return, which was realised in 2022 after an eight-year hiatus, Ainsworth said:

Time Team has probably been one of the biggest things that has happened to archaeology for many years – to make archaeology and history accessible, and we need to keep that profile going whatever way we can.

As of 2010, Ainsworth has been affiliated with the history and archaeology department at the University of Chester, where he is a visiting professor.

He is a Fellow of the Society of Antiquaries FSA of London, the world's oldest archaeological society. For some years, he was president of the Friends of Epiacum (also called Whitley Castle), a Roman fort on the southern edge of Northumberland, which he has surveyed and studied in depth as part of a more extensive project focusing on the development of industry and farming in this part of the North Pennines. He is closely involved in several other projects around England and regularly gives public talks.

== Bibliography ==
- High Park and Cow Close, Lancaster, and South Lakeland, Lancashire and Cumbria (1998) by Marcus Jecock and Stewart Ainsworth
- Prehistoric embanked pit-alignments on Ebberston Low Moor, Ryedale, North Yorkshire (1999) by Stewart Ainsworth and Alastair Oswald
- Patterns of the past: essays in landscape archaeology for Christopher Taylor (1999) by Christopher Taylor, Paul Pattison, David Field, and Stewart Ainsworth
- An Iron Age hillfort at Glead's Cleugh, Northumberland (2001) by Trevor Pearson and Stewart Ainsworth
- An Iron Age hillfort and its environs on Castle Hill, Alnham, Northumberland (2001) by Trevor Pearson and Stewart Ainsworth
- Greenburn Copper Mine, Cumbria (2001) by Alastair Oswald, Dave McOmish and Stewart Ainsworth
- An Iron Age hillfort on Staw Hill, Northumberland (2002) by Trevor Pearson, Alastair Oswald and Stewart Ainsworth
- Ring Chesters, Northumberland: an Iron Age hillfort and its environs (2002) by Alastair Oswald, Trevor Pearson, and Stewart Ainsworth
- Stanton Moor, Derbyshire (2002) by Stewart Ainsworth
- Where on earth are we?: the Global Positioning System (GPS) in archaeological field survey (2003) by Stewart Ainsworth and Bernard Thomason
- Chester amphitheatre: from gladiators to gardens (2005) by Stewart Ainsworth and Tony Wilmott
- The Roman amphitheatre at Chester: an interim account (2006) by Tony Wilmott, Dan Garner, and Stewart Ainsworth
- Craster, Northumberland: an archaeological investigation of a World War II radar station complex (2006) by Abby Hunt and Stewart Ainsworth
- Understanding the archaeology of landscapes: a guide to good recording practice (2007) by Stewart Ainsworth
- Hillforts: prehistoric strongholds of Northumberland National Park (2007) by Alastair Oswald, Stewart Ainsworth, Trevor Pearson, and Paul Frodsham.
- Grassington lead mines, North Yorkshire: a rapid assessment of the threats posed by road management and erosion (2009) by Stewart Ainsworth and Andrew Burn
- Whitley Castle, Tynedale, Northumberland: an archaeological investigation of the Roman fort and its setting (2009) by Dave Went and Stewart Ainsworth
- Scordale, Cumbria: the archaeology of a North Pennine valley (2010) by Abby Hunt and Stewart Ainsworth
- 'The Northumberland and Durham Rock Art Project: some observations on the landscape context and 'taphonomy' of rock art, and recommendations for future projects' (2010) by Alastair Oswald and Stewart Ainsworth in Barnett, T. & Sharpe, K. (eds) Carving a Future for British Rock Art: New directions for research, management and presentation, 37–56. Exeter: Oxbow Books
- Osmington White Horse hill-figure, Dorset: a regal restoration (2013) by Stewart Ainsworth and Jon Horgan
- 'Remotely acquired, not remotely sensed: using lidar as a field survey tool' (2013) by Stewart Ainsworth, Alastair Oswald and Dave Went in R.S. Opitz, & D.C. Cowley (eds) Interpreting Archaeological Topography. 3D Data, Visualisation and Observation. AARG Occasional Paper 5, 206–22. Oxford: Oxbow Books
- 'Swaledale's Early Medieval Kingdom Revisited' (2015) by Tim Gates, Stewart Ainsworth and Alastair Oswald Landscapes 16, 3–17
- 'New Approaches at Yeavering' (2016) by Sarah Semple, Buchanan, B., Oliver, D., Alastair Oswald, Stewart Ainsworth and Miket, R. Archaeology in Northumberland 22, 40–41
- 'Putting archaeology on the map: reflections on two decades of landscape-scale field survey in the uplands of northern England.' (2020) by Stewart Ainsworth, Alastair Oswald and Dave Went in Roger Martlew (ed) Pennine Perspectives: Professional and Community Investigations of Landscape Heritage, 13–32
- 'Two newly identified possible 'hengiform' monuments in the North Pennines' (2021) Stewart Ainsworth, Dave McOmish, Alastair Oswald and Andrew Payne in G. Hey and P. Frodsham (eds) New Light on the Neolithic of Northern England, 211-22
