= John Gater =

British archaeological geophysicist

John Gater FSA
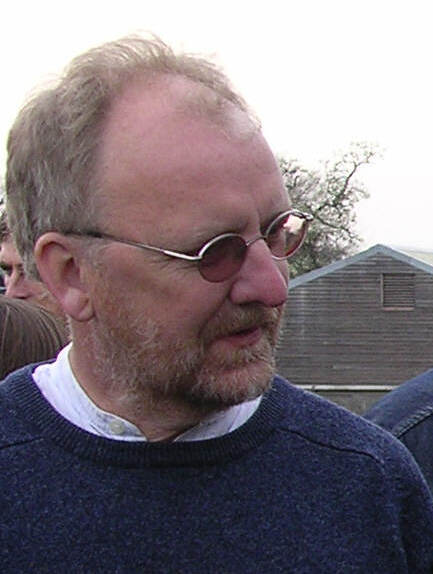
- Gater in 2007

Academic background
- Education: University of Bradford

Academic work
- Discipline: Archaeology
- Sub-discipline: Geophysical survey
- Institutions: British Gas; Ancient Monuments Laboratory, English Heritage; University of Bradford

John Gater, FSA is a British archaeological geophysicist who featured regularly on the Channel 4 archaeological television series Time Team.

== Biography ==
Gater was educated at the University of Bradford and graduated with a BSc Archaeological Sciences in 1979. He worked with British Gas (for five years), the Ancient Monuments Laboratory (English Heritage) and Bradford University Research. In 1983 he became a member of the Institute of Field Archaeologists (CIfA) and is now also an associate editor for the Journal of Archaeological Prospection. In 1986 he founded Geophysical Surveys of Bradford (GSB), an independent consultancy in geophysics for archaeology, which was later acquired by the SUMO Group in 2012.

On 21 July 2006, Gater was awarded an honorary Doctor of Science by the University of Bradford for his "distinguished contributions to the field of Archaeological Geophysics".

On the DVD set The Very Best Time Team Digs, Gater states that, as of the time of the DVD's production, his favourite dig was Turkdean (the only site where the quality of the archaeological data was so good that Time Team returned at a later date to dig it again).

On 1 January 2008, he was elected a Fellow of the Society of Antiquaries of London (FSA).

== Selected works ==
- Gaffney, Christopher F.; Gater, John A. (2003). Revealing the buried past: geophysics for archaeologists. Stroud: Tempus. ISBN 978-0752425566.
- Gaffney, Chris; Gater, John; Ovenden, Susan (June 2002). "The use of geophysical techniques in archaeological evaluations" (PDF). Institute of Field Archaeologists Paper. 6.
