= Time Team series 6 =

Time Team
- Season 6
- No. of episodes: 13

Release
- Original network: Channel 4
- Original release: 3 January – 28 March 1999

Series chronology
- ← Previous; Series 5 Next → Series 7

This is a list of Time Team episodes from series 6.

== Episode ==
=== Series 6 ===
Episode # refers to the air date order. The Time Team Specials are aired in between regular episodes, but are omitted from this list. Regular contributors on Time Team include: Tony Robinson (presenter); archaeologists Mick Aston, Phil Harding, Carenza Lewis, Beric Morley; Guy de la Bédoyère (historian); Victor Ambrus (illustrator); Stewart Ainsworth (landscape investigator); John Gater, Chris Gaffney (Geophysics); Henry Chapman (surveyor); Mark Corney (Roman expert).

No. overall	No. in season	Title	Location	Coordinates	Original release date
31	1	"Wedgwood's First Factory"	Burslem, Stoke-on-Trent	53.045818°N 2.196994°W	3 January 1999
The Team are in Burslem, Stoke-on-Trent, to investigate what remains of Josiah Wedgwood's first factory and to discover what pottery he was making there. They find evidence of several centuries of potting and bottle kilns, including a time capsule of the pottery of Enoch Wood & Sons. Experimental archaeology: a replica creamware vase.
32	2	"Episode Two (Roman Building, Papcastle, Cumbria)"	Papcastle, Cumbria	54.668705°N 3.380394°W	10 January 1999
The team are in North West England, investigating Roman finds and a possible Roman building, unearthed in a family's back garden. The house is just 100 metres from a Roman fort, and south-west of the end of Hadrian's Wall. Geophysics are using state-of-the art Swedish radar equipment, to detect foundations beneath two metres of soil. A fragment of bronze mirror hints at a domestic settlement, a vicus, that would have sprung up next to the fort. But the diggers are finding plenty of archaeology, indicating much larger and more organised Roman building, possibly a city. Through the expertise of potter Gilbert Burroughes, the team are going to try to make a Samian ware bowl during the three days. The team are joined by Roman specialist Lindsay Allason-Jones.
33	3	"Episode Three (Dominican Friary, Thetford, Norfolk)"	Thetford, Norfolk	52.413928°N 0.744887°E	17 January 1999
Time Team have been invited by pupils of Thetford Grammar School in Norfolk, to investigate the remains of a Dominican friary church and a 1,000-year-old Norman cathedral, in their playground. There is much interest from the pupils when the team excavate human bones. Ecclesiastical historian Janet Burton describes the origins of the Dominican Order. Stonemason Simon Williams gives a practical demonstration of medieval wall-building using knapped flint and lime mortar. Stained glass expert David King confirms medieval dates for fragments from the friary. The junior school makes a timeline frieze, complete with felt bishops and monks. It all ends in an open evening for parents.
34	4	"Cooper's Hole"	Cheddar Gorge, Somerset	51.282857°N 2.763778°W	24 January 1999
Investigation, at the invitation of the cave's owner, the Marquess of Bath, to see if there is evidence of Palaeolithic human activity in the cave. This may be among the oldest homes in England. The ultimate aim is to get the site scheduled and thus protected from unofficial damage. However it soon becomes clear there is a lot of preparatory work involved. They are joined by palaeontologist Andy Currant, and cave archaeologists Larry Barham and Kate Robson Brown. Caver Malcolm Cotter directs them to a cache of bones; but the tunnel is blocked by sediment from flooding.
35	5	"Episode Five (Plympton, Devon)"	Plympton, Devon	50.382626°N 4.047981°W	31 January 1999
In the 12th century many towns were designed and laid out on regular lines. The people of Plympton believe there is enough evidence to plot the layout of the medieval town which surrounds the ruins of their castle, and which was formerly owned by the immensely powerful and wealthy de Redvers family. As usual, Time Team have three days to find it. Back gardens and interiors will provide the clues, rather than frontages which have probably been altered many times in the last 800 years. So they will need plenty of help from local householders. They are joined by Plymouth city archaeologist Keith Ray and dendrochronologist Robert Howard. See also: 24 Fore Street, Plympton, Carlton House, Chapel House, The Old Rectory, The Pent House, Tan Cottage and The Lodge
36	6	"Episode Six (Medieval Dockyard, Smallhythe, Kent)"	Smallhythe, Kent	51.038072°N 0.700398°E	7 February 1999
Looking for evidence of a 15th century dock, the team are in Small Hythe. The dock was once next to the mile-wide River Rother but its location is now an overgrown field, ten miles from the sea. And early excavations reveal nothing more recent than wood from a prehistoric forest. Medieval ship expert Ian Friel explains that the dockyard used to have high naval significance, and was visited by Henry V. Woodworker Damian Goodburn uses authentic tools to build a ship's clinker hull. Victor draws the biggest ship ever built here, the Jesus. Using geophysics, John Gater and Sue Ovenden pinpoint the course of the old river. And very soon the finds start to accumulate, revealing the true scale of activity here.
37	7	"Episode Seven (Roman Bath-house, Beauport Park, Sussex)"	Beauport Park, East Sussex	50.902470°N 0.539778°E	14 February 1999
Historian Guy de la Bedoyere asks the team to investigate the isolated ruins of a bath-house, discovered by Gerald Brodribb in the midst of dense Sussex woodland. Gerald has made a scale model of the building, and Guy explains the connection to the Roman navy. After a demonstration of dowsing from Gerald, the team's first task is to clear the land before digging. With ancient technology expert Jake Keen and blacksmith Reg Miles, Phil attempts to smelt iron using a traditional furnace. The team are also joined by archaeometallurgist Gerry McDonnell.
38	8	"Bombers in Reedham Marshes"	Reedham marshes, Norfolk	52.578406°N 1.586435°E	21 February 1999
Time Team team up with air crash investigators to discover what happened to two B-17 bombers which crashed with loss of all lives on board on 21 February 1944 into marshes near Reedham, Norfolk. The airplanes were returning from a bombing raid on a German target as part of the Big Week offensive. Parts of one airplane are recovered, and the Team speak to surviving crew members of a third plane that was in the formation. Experimental archaeology: A piece of nose art painted as a memorial to the bomber crews, painted by a former Red Cross volunteer who had painted some during WWII.
39	9	"Turkdean II"	Turkdean, Gloucestershire	51.869354°N 1.858265°W	28 February 1999
Time Team revisit a live dig from 1997, where they found a large Roman complex in a Gloucestershire field. But at the same time, geophysics recorded evidence of more buildings. And so the team have returned to investigate a greatly expanded area. Almost immediately Phil uncovers some impressive looking archaeology. They decide to build a Roman altar with a special inscription. They are rejoined by Roman specialists David Neal and Lindsay Allason-Jones.
40	10	"Episode Ten (Bronze Age, Kemerton, Worcestershire)"	Kemerton, Worcestershire	52.028665°N 2.086049°W	7 March 1999
An aerial survey of a Worcestershire field has revealed cropmarks leading to substantial Bronze Age finds. But Iron Age remains also exist. Time Team tries to sort it out. Local schoolchildren help with a bit of fieldwalking; and Mick shows how cropmarks and posthole marks become visible in fields. Francis Pryor explains the difference between Bronze Age and Iron Age and describes life in a roundhouse. Also joining the team are archaeologist Malcolm Atkin and environmentalist Liz Pearson; while wood specialist Guy Apter gets the kids to help make a Bronze Age ard (plough).
41	11	"Episode Eleven (Norman Church, Bawsey, Norfolk)"	Bawsey, Norfolk	52.759183°N 0.462398°E	14 March 1999
This live dig centres on a ruined Norman church on a hill in Norfolk. This National Trust site promises to be the richest source of finds that Time Team have yet seen, with previous evidence of human occupation from most periods in antiquity. This requires several trenches, including the longest one that Time Team have ever dug. They start with some fieldwalking and metal detectoring, before digging in earnest. Among many finds are a bronze age arrow head, a medieval tiled floor, coins and several well-preserved skeletons. One skull shows clear evidence of having been brutally slaughtered by a swordsman on horseback. The team are joined by Helen Geake, Neil Holbrook, Andrew Rogerson, pottery expert Paul Blinkhorn, osteoarchaeologist Margaret Cox, and historian John Blair. Celebrities Sandi Toksvig and Hugh Fearnley-Whittingstall also drop in. Hugh and Victor help Saxon re-enactor Russell Scott to recreate a bronze artefact from scratch.
42	12	"Nevis (Part 1 of 2)"	Nevis, West Indies	17.152638°N 62.612752°W	21 March 1999
Invited by historian David Small, the team are on the tiny Caribbean island of Nevis, for a six-day dig to uncover the history of sugar production and slavery here. They are investigating a particular plantation, Montravers Estate, now overgrown, originally owned by wealthy 18th century Bristolean John Prater Pinney. Robin visits Bristol University, researching the extensive documentation. Back on Nevis, pottery expert David Barker is shown pottery sherds, most of which he dates to the 1840s. Phil crosses to neighbouring St. Kitts, to help make sugar from sugar cane. Sugar would have been extracted in a mill operated by teams of oxen. Molasses, the byproduct of sugar processing, was fermented to make rum. In the jungle Stewart searches for a slave village. They are also joined by local historian David Rollinson.
43	13	"Nevis (Part 2 of 2)"	Nevis, West Indies	17.152638°N 62.612752°W (Montravers Estate); 17.182401°N 62.619952°W (Jamestown)	28 March 1999
