= Talayotic settlement =

Ancient settlement type

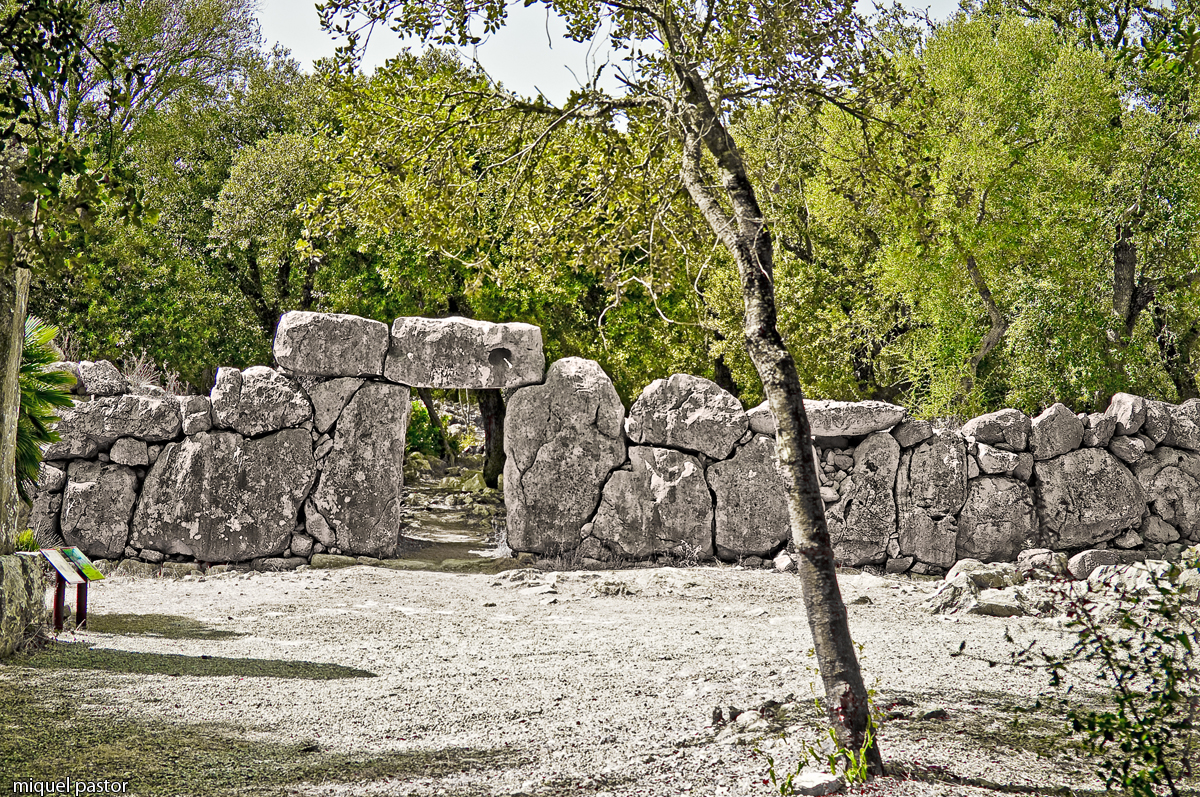
Wall of the Talaiotic settlement of Ses Païsses (Artá).

A Talayotic settlement is a type of prehistoric construction from the Iron Age found on the Spanish Balearic islands of Mallorca and Menorca. These settlements first emerged in the late second and early first millennium BCE during the Talayotic period. Many settlements were built in areas that had been inhabited during the preceding Pre-Talayotic period.

The sites continued to be occupied and transformed during the Post-Talaiotic period (c. 600–123 BCE), a phase characterized by the construction of new structures, such as the taula sanctuaries of Menorca.

Talayotic settlements utilised techniques of Cyclopean masonry, a method of construction using large stones without mortar. The settlements typically contained one or more stone towers known as talayots, alongside other structures such as dwellings. These sites functioned as centres for economic and social activity, based on agriculture and livestock, while the towers and walls also served as defensive outposts. Fortified settlements on Menorca, including Torre d'en Galmés and Son Catlar, are among the best-preserved and architecturally developed examples documented in the Balearic Islands.

Recent archaeological and DNA studies suggest that the Talayotic people had mixed ancestry. Their genetic profile shows links to pastoralist groups from the Eastern European steppes who had migrated to the Iberian Peninsula during the Bronze Age. This mixed origin is supported by separate analyses of mitochondrial DNA, which conclude the island's settlement involved several distinct European flows with a moderate genetic affinity to Iberia.

Notable surviving Talayotic settlements on Mallorca include Ses Païsses, Capocorb Vell, Son Fornés, and the seaside cemetery known as the Necropolis of Son Real.

== Construction of the walls ==
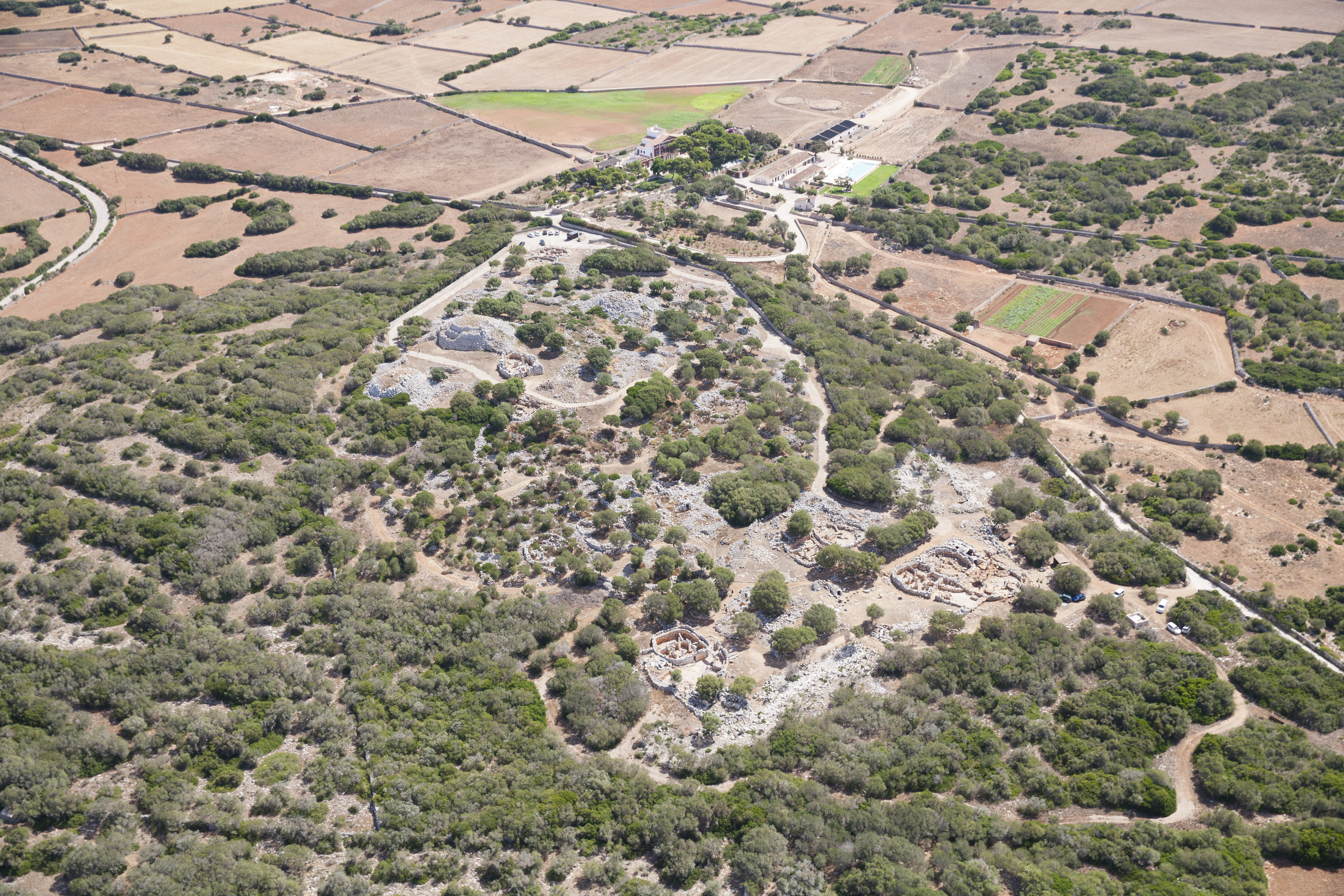
Aerial view of the Talaiotic settlement of Torre d'en Galmés (Alayor, Menorca).

Three different construction techniques are observed in the walls of Talayotic fortified settlements:

- Orthostatic walls were made of large, flat irregular slabs; known as orthostats; placed vertically on a base of horizontal stones. Above these orthostats, irregular stones of decreasing size were placed dry to increase the height of the wall.
- Walls of regular pieces were made with rows of regularly shaped stones placed directly on the foundation or the ground, without orthostats.
- Mixed walls used orthostats (similar to those mentioned above) crowned with medium-sized, rectangular stones, dry and placed in rows.

It is uncertain whether the different techniques correspond to distinct chronological periods. Only one wall has been chronologically dated; in the settlement of Ses Païsses (Artá); to around 800 BCE. It is plausible that the upper part of the wall was crowned with irregular stones and later with Punico-Roman architectural influences. Some parts of the wall may have been restored with rows of regular ashlar stones.

Archaeological surveys have identified more than 250 Talaiotic-period settlements on Mallorca, which indicates a relatively dense distribution of sites across the island.

== Talaiotic settlements in Menorca ==
In Menorca, the settlements, in addition to the talayots, also feature structures typical of the Menorcan Post-Talaiotic period, including taula enclosures, Post-Talaiotic habitation circles, hypostyle halls, and water collection systems.

Few settlements in Menorca have identifiable walls. Some display walls only in certain sections, while many show no trace of them. Houses at the periphery of settlements had thick outer walls that may have served a defensive purpose, and some habitation circles are attached to or built against wall structures. Menorcan walls appear to be generally more recent than those on Mallorca, with most dating to the final centuries of the first millennium BCE, whereas the majority of Mallorcan walls date to the beginning of that millennium. However, this remains a subject of debate, as the striking similarities between the walls on both islands make it difficult to accept a significant chronological gap.

At the settlement of Son Catlar in Menorca, sections of the walls feature orthostats, while other areas exhibit more regular construction with a tendency toward horizontal rows. Additionally, rectangular defensive bastions attached to the exterior of the walls demonstrate classical influence, constructed from rectangular stones arranged in orderly rows. These reforms can be dated to the late 3rd century BCE, in the context of the Second Punic War, and subsequently, to around the 2nd century BCE, in connection with the Roman conquest of the island.

Torre d'en Galmés is one of the largest documented Talaiotic settlements in the Balearic Islands, with an extensive layout that includes multiple talayots, dwellings, and communal structures.

== UNESCO World Heritage Site ==
Talaiotic Menorca was added to the UNESCO World Heritage List in 2023. The area, divided into nine zones, encompasses several archaeological sites belonging to a prehistoric island culture characterized by a strong cultural connection with the sky. The island buildings feature Cyclopean architecture over a period of approximately 1500 years, documenting a chronology spanning from the emergence of Cyclopean construction around 1600 BCE to the Roman conquest of the islands in 123 BCE. Preserved monuments on the island include funerary navetas, circular houses, taula sanctuaries, and talayots.

The 1,500 archaeological sites found on Menorca, which has a land area of 700 km² (270 mi²), equates to around two sites per square kilometer.
