= Ses Païsses =

Bronze Age Settlement

Coordinates: 39°41′14″N 3°21′13″E

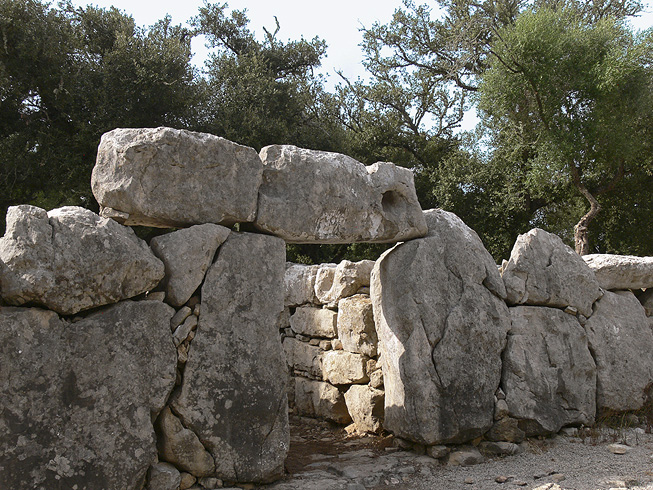
Main entrance to Ses Païsses talayotic settlement, Mallorca

Ses Païsses is a Bronze Age talayotic settlement on the southeastern outskirts of Artà in northeastern Mallorca. It is one of the most important and best-preserved prehistoric sites in the Balearic Islands, although it is largely overgrown with woodland, mainly Quercus ilex (holm oak).

== Definition ==
The talaiots, or talayots, are Bronze Age megalithic structures on the islands of Menorca and Mallorca. There are at least 274 of them. Dating from the late second millennium and early first millennium BC (between 1,300–900BC), they are round or square structures built of rough stone, around a central space at the center of which stood a column. This supported a ceiling of stone slabs which also formed the floor of the next story. Their purpose is not clearly understood: religious or tribal ceremonies, storehouses and distribution centres have been suggested. They are not thought to have been used as dwelling places or as defensive buildings.

These monuments pre-date the taulas, which are usually found nearby. The Talaiotic Culture began some 3,000 years ago and ended with the arrival of the Romans in the Balearic Islands in 123BC.

== Development of the settlement ==
The Ses Païsses settlement is thought to have begun as a cylindrical talaiot, or "turriform", built during the first millennium BC (c900–800BC) on a hillside with a commanding view of the surrounding countryside. Originally it would have stood alone, probably as a territorial marker. The tower is 12m in diameter and still stands 4m tall; there are stairs within the massively thick wall, but the building's central column has not survived. Visitors to the site are not allowed to access this building.

A low passageway, roughly 0.75m high, runs right through the building from one side to the other, linking the central chamber to a later room known as "the hypostyle chamber" adjoining it to the northeast.

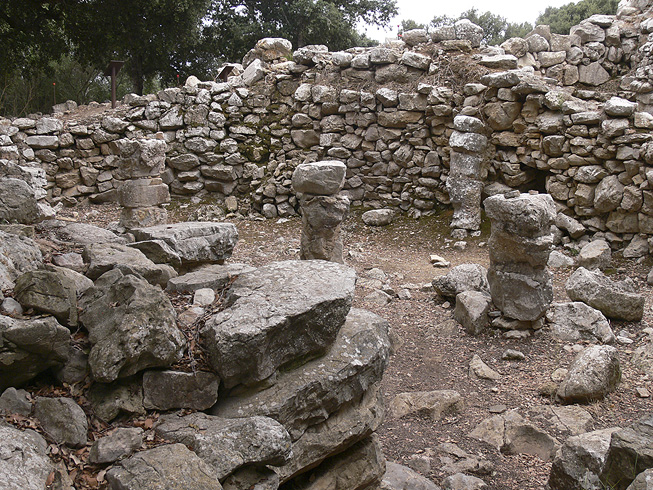
The hypostyle chamber adjoins the central talayot (to the right) which is thought to be the site's oldest structure

The hypostyle chamber is so-called because of the three short columns at the centre of the room and the remains of seven others built into the walls. It has two parallel walls, one square end and a rounded or "apsidal" end. It measures approximately 12m × 8m.

Next to the hypostyle chamber, to the south, and also attached to the central talaiot, is another apsidal horseshoe-shaped chamber. It has been dated to the post-Talayotic period (500–123BC). Excavated in 1959 and 1960, it contained several hearths with fragments of bone, talayotic ceramics and charcoal. A burial and iron tools were also found, indicating later use of the site.

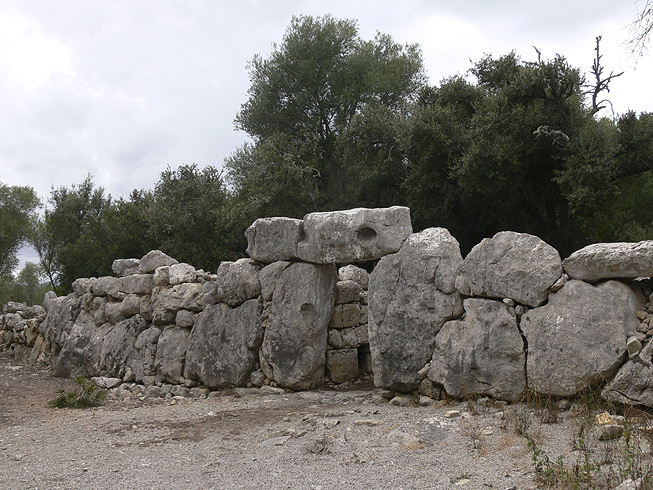
The "cyclopean" perimeter walls (built circa 650–540BC) are more recent than many of the buildings within

A series of kidney-shaped chambers clustered around the south side of the original talaiot has been excavated. There are indications of other buildings in an elliptical central area measuring roughly 65m × 55m around the talaiot, and others within the massive outer wall of the settlement, also roughly elliptical, which measures some 140m × 105m. Built sometime between 650–540BC, long after the central talaiot and many of its surrounding buildings, this thick wall of cyclopean masonry consists of a base row of huge outer boulders, some weighing around 8 tonnes, with smaller ones (mostly now scattered) above them; it is faced on the inside with rows of smaller rocks.

There seem to have been three entrances in this perimeter wall, which is about 350m long. The main gateway through the outer wall is at the southeast and consists of two vertical boulders with a third balanced on them as a lintel. It opens into a passageway 4.3m long with stairs to either side. There is another similarly sized entrance to the northeast, though its lintel has disappeared. The southwest gateway, which gave access to a nearby spring, also has no lintel, and is less obvious.

== Other notable sites ==
Other talayotic sites include:

- Capocorb Vell, 12 km south of Llucmajor: the most important Talayotic site on Mallorca, with five talaiots and ancient village
- Son Oleza dolmen, Mallorca, discovered in 1999
- Talatí de Dalt, Menorca
- Trebaluger, Menorca
- Trepucó, Menorca
- Torre d'en Galmés, Menorca

Similar but not necessarily related are the "nuraghi" of Sardinia, the "torre" of Corsica, and the "sesi" of Pantelleria.

== See also ==
- Naveta – Cyclopean boat-shaped buildings pre-dating the Talayotic culture
- Nuredduna (character) – legendary Balearic seeress of the talayots around Ses Païsses

== Sources ==
- The talayotic settlement at Ses Païsses – The gateway to prehistoric Mallorca, 2007 (Official guide booklet by Irene Cabrer Gonzalez & Margalida Castells, translated by Judith Glueck)
