= Carlton House, Plympton =

House in Plymouth, Devon, England

Carlton House
- Location within Devon Carlton House, Plympton (England)

General information
- Location: 43 Fore Street, Plympton, England
- Coordinates: 50.3828°N 4.0481°W
- Completed: early 19th century

Technical details
- Floor count: 2

Carlton House is a Grade II listed building in Plympton, Devon, England. Standing at 43 Fore Street, Plympton's main street, it dates to the early 19th century.

It has an incised stucco frontage with a plinth. A central panelled pilastered doorway has a moulded hood on consoles. The two-storey building has a double-depth floor plan with two rooms at the front flanking a central entrance hall, a similar layout to the nearby The Lodge at 103 Fore Street.

The building was evaluated by Time Team during their visit to Plympton in 1999. A wall belonging to an earlier incarnation of the adjacent Tan Cottage was discovered in the back garden of the property.
