= Time Team series 3 =

Time Team
- Season 3
- No. of episodes: 6

Release
- Original network: Channel 4
- Original release: 7 January – 11 February 1996

Series chronology
- ← Previous; Series 2 Next → Series 4

This is a list of Time Team episodes from series 3.

== Episode ==
=== Series 3 ===
Episode # refers to the air date order. The Time Team Specials are aired in between regular episodes, but are omitted from this list. Regular contributors on Time Team include: Tony Robinson (presenter); archaeologists Mick Aston, Phil Harding, Carenza Lewis; Robin Bush (historian); Beric Morley (historic buildings); Victor Ambrus (illustrator); Stewart Ainsworth (landscape investigator); John Gater (geophysicist); Henry Chapman (surveyor).

No. overall	No. in season	Title	Location	Coordinates	Original release date
10	1	"Prehistoric Fogou"	Boleigh, Cornwall; Treveneague, Cornwall	50.071303°N 5.582972°W; 50.129124°N 5.434687°W	7 January 1996
Recorded between 17 and 19 March 1995, the team try to discover what a 2000-year-old underground chamber (fogou) beneath Jo May's garden was used for. Dowser Hamish Miller shows the extent of the fogou beneath the lawn, and Tony tries his hand at dowsing. But Mick is skeptical, preferring to rely on the geophysical survey. They are also trying to find the Iron Age settlement that would have adjoined the fogou. Joining the team are archaeological geophysicist Susan Ovenden, and county archaeologist Nick Johnson. The programme includes an experiment in extracting pure tin from the local stream.
11	2	"Hunting for Mammoth"	Stanton Harcourt, Oxfordshire	51.741998°N 1.402281°W	14 January 1996
Recorded between 21 and 23 April 1995, in this episode the team go to a gravel pit that is soon to become landfill, where they attempt to unearth 200,000-year-old remains of mammoths and other prehistoric animals. Gravel pits are typical sites for Paleolithic remains. But the chances of finding evidence of any prehistoric peoples are remote. Joining the team are Christine Buckingham, Kate Scott, and palaeontologist Russell Coope. Wood anatomist Rowena Gale tries to match ancient and modern wood samples For this episode the team are joined by archaeologist Kate Scott and geologist Christine Buckingham.
12	3	"Village of the Templars"	Templecombe, Somerset	50.997661°N 2.415219°W	21 January 1996
Recorded between 26 and 28 May 1995. A 13th century picture of Christ, strikingly similar to that on the Turin Shroud, has turned up. It's believed to belong to the Knights Templar, a medieval order of monks who gave their name to the village of Templecombe. The team investigate a manor house thought to be on the site of a monastery. What's left of the monastery, and who were the Templars anyway? So far all the evidence seems to be outside the house, where Phil and the team have already dug up pieces of encaustic tile. Carenza and Robin are doing some research among the documents.
13	4	"A Wreck of the Spanish Armada"	Teignmouth, Devon	50.548171°N 3.489410°W	28 January 1996
Recorded between 30 June and 2 July 1995. 20 years ago a teenage boy discovered a 400-year-old bronze cannon in water close to the south Devon coast. Nobody has yet identified the ship it belonged to. Will there be enough left of the wreck to identify it? As usual, Time Team have only three days to find out. Tony is looking forward to getting into his diving suit. But the team cannot dive until the wreck's archaeological supervisor, Chris Preece, arrives. Meanwhile the wreck's finder, Simon Burton, tells his story. Undeterred by disappointing geophysics results, the divers go ahead with their search in murky water. On land, armoury expert Nicholas Hall demonstrates the cannon. Ultimately Robin comes up with a theory about the ship's origin and purpose.
14	5	"Palace of the Irish Kings"	Emain Macha; Creeveroe; Haughey's Fort; Ballydoo	54.3453°N 6.7186°W; 54.3489°N 6.7076°W; 54.3499°N 6.7140°W; 54.3494°N 6.7317°W	4 February 1996
Recorded between 7 and 9 April 1995, the team are at Emain Macha (aka Navan Fort), County Armagh, where according to Celtic legends three palaces were built. The evidence of two have been found and the team try to find evidence of the third.
15	6	"Treasures of the Roman Field"	Lavenham, Suffolk	52.12409°N 0.83037°E	11 February 1996
Recorded between 28 and 30 August 1995. The team arrive in a large square field about 20 miles from Colchester. This is an area typically rich in Roman activity. Several remains have previously been dug up, including coins, an elaborate key, and Samian ware. Adrian Thorpe, the farmer, wants to know more. The indications are of a settlement with high status buildings, maybe timber-framed. With recycled fragments of genuine Roman glass, fired up in a homemade furnace, glassblower Ed Iglehart creates an authentic conical beaker. Among hundreds of finds is a metal owl brooch. They are joined by Jude Plouviez from Suffolk County Council, Roman specialist Lindsay Allason-Jones, environmental archaeologist Peter Murphy, and coin specialist Daphne Briggs.
