= Mortitx =

Coordinates: 39.8694°N 2.9240°E

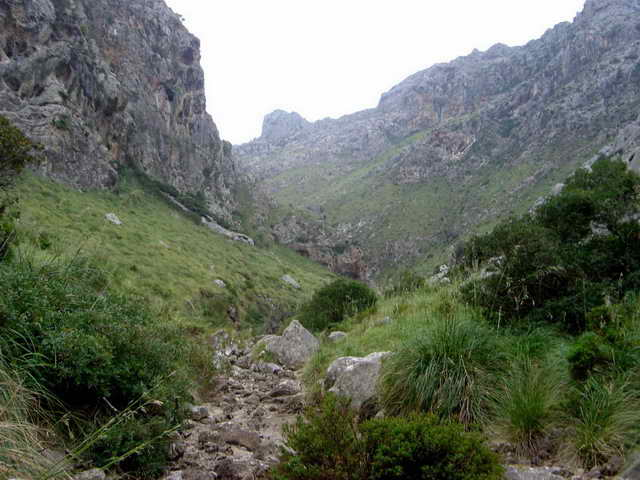

Mortitx is an area covering several square miles of mostly rough mountainside on the coast of the northeast part of the Serra de Tramuntana mountain range of Majorca Island, Spain. In the part presently known as Mortixet there are archaeological remains from the ancient peoples who inhabited Majorca (the Talaiot builders) for several thousand years up until the Roman invasion of 123 BC.

No documents exist from the Arab period; the first documented mention is in the aftermath of King James I of Aragon conquering the island in 1230. In the survey covering every farm, mill, town and hamlet shared out among the king's followers, Mortitx is listed. Together with twenty-five other mountain estates Mortitx was given to the representatives of the Knights Templar; those warrior monks received the neighbouring parish of Pollença. The Order of the Temple was dissolved in 1307, and Mortitx seems to have passed into private hands.

In the mid-20th century, the government of the Balearic Islands took over the mountainous part as a publicly owned nature reserve, while the fertile farm land was planted with fruit trees. More recently this was turned over to grape vines and various wines are produced.

The area has extensive coastal cliffs and a narrow ravine known as the “Torrent Fondo de Mortitx” that takes flash-flood rains down to the sea. It much used for abseiling and rock climbing. At times of major rainfall there are dramatic flows of water.
