= Time Team series 5 =

Time Team
- Season 5
- No. of episodes: 8

Release
- Original network: Channel 4
- Original release: 4 January – 1 March 1998

Series chronology
- ← Previous; Series 4 Next → Series 6

This is a list of Time Team episodes from series 5. Each episode in this series is accompanied by an episode of Time Team Extra where the team's historian Robin Bush and a guest look back at the respective excavation.

== Episode ==
=== Series 5 ===
Episode # refers to the air date order. The Time Team Specials are aired in between regular episodes, but are omitted from this list. Regular contributors on Time Team include: Tony Robinson (presenter); archaeologists Mick Aston, Phil Harding, Carenza Lewis, Neil Holbrook; historians Beric Morley and Robin Bush; Victor Ambrus (illustrator); Stewart Ainsworth (landscape investigator); John Gater (geophysicist); Henry Chapman (surveyor); Mark Corney (Roman buildings); Sue Francis, Steve Breeze (computer graphics).

No. overall	No. in season	Title	Location	Coordinates	Original release date
23	1	"Episode One (Search for Richmond Palace)"	Richmond, Surrey	51.460373°N 0.310116°W	4 January 1998
Filmed between 25 and 27 July 1997. The team are camped on an immaculate suburban lawn next to the Thames. They are searching for the now vanished Richmond Palace, site of the death of Elizabeth I. But amazingly nobody is exactly sure of its whereabouts. The first task is to dig up the lawn under the supervision of landscape gardener Martin Whitaker. Immediately they find evidence of a substantial high status Tudor building. They are joined by palaces expert Simon Thurley and local historian John Cloake. Tudor expert Hazel Forsyth shows Carenza how to make a pomander. Plants from the garden are used by Maria Lis-Balchin to brew up some Elizabethan perfume. The property owner was The Baron van Dedem.
24	2	"Episode Two (Somerset Levels)"	Greylake, Somerset	51.098932°N 2.869454°W	11 January 1998
Recorded between 17 and 19 March 1997, in this episode they try to find an ancient wooden trackway across the boggy Somerset Levels while also trying to build a replica of a trackway. The team are joined by archaeologist Richard Brunning.
25	3	"Episode Three (Sanday, Orkney)"	Sanday, Orkney	59.264121°N 2.60732°W	18 January 1998
Filmed between 7 and 9 June 1997, the team travel to Sanday after some schoolchildren wrote to them saying they thought a local mound had Viking origins. The team are joined by Olwyn Owen from Historic Scotland, and Steve Dockrill and Julie Bond from the University of Bradford. Viking enthusiast Keith Prosser is challenged to make a 9th century bone comb.
26	4	"Turkdean"	Turkdean, Gloucestershire	51.86964°N 1.85854°W	25 January 1998
Highlights from Time Team Live 1997, the team go to Gloucestershire in search of a Roman villa. They are joined by Keith Branigan from the University of Sheffield, and Lindsay Allason-Jones (Roman finds expert). The programme includes a demonstration of making a pewter bowl from raw materials. TV personality Bill Oddie pays a visit. Hugh Fearnley-Whittingstall teams up with Roman chef Aurello Spagnolo to make an authentic feast.
27	5	"Episode Five (Beaker Settlement, Mallorca, Spain)"	Deià, Mallorca, Spain	39.712479°N 2.600798°E	1 February 1998
Recorded between 9 and 11 May 1997, the team are in Mallorca where American archaeologist Bill Waldren is excavating the Copper Age Beaker settlement of Son Oleza. They are joined by site director Josep "Pep" Ensenyat. Phil and Pep try smelting some copper from the local ore. Astroarchaeologist Michael Hoskin looks at the celestial alignment of some stones at the site.
28	6	"Episode Six (Aston Eyre)"	Aston Eyre, Shropshire	52.543986°N 2.513156°W	8 February 1998
Filmed between 27 and 29 June 1997, the team go to Shropshire and search for a complex of medieval buildings in Aston Eyre, where the only remaining building is a farmhouse that used to be a gatehouse. They are joined by archaeologist Mark Horton and archivist Paul Stamper. Tree rings expert Dan Miles tries to get some dates from beams in the gatehouse. Ian Pritchett demonstrates a traditional lime kiln. Finds: potential earlier structure found at end of day three, but time ran out before they could determine what it was.
29	7	"Episode Seven (Cathedral Hill, Downpatrick, County Down)"	Downpatrick, County Down	54.327224°N 5.721692°W	22 February 1998
Recorded between 19 and 21 February 1997, the team look for the early monastic buildings on Cathedral Hill, where according to legend St. Patrick built a monastery and was buried. They are also digging up medieval finds, including roof tiles and glass, which indicate a high status building. They soon identify the large double ditch which originally enclosed the monastery complex. Victor tries his hand at medieval calligraphy and helps create an illuminated manuscript with a portrait of a familiar face, complete with hat and feather. We also see some vellum making.
30	8	"Episode Eight (High Worsall)"	High Worsall, North Yorkshire	54.478678°N 1.405971°W	1 March 1998
Filmed between 10 and 12 October 1997, Time Team go to High Worsall, near Middlesbrough, a village that almost completely disappeared hundreds of years ago. Finds: 14th century buildings and manor house, pristine spindle whorl. Experimental demonstration: fishing and cooking caught fish. Also, historians Robin Bush and Dawn Hadley are followed while they research the village and create a timeline.
