= Thynghowe =

Ancient open-air assembly place

Coordinates: 53°12′31.71″N 1°6′6.51″W

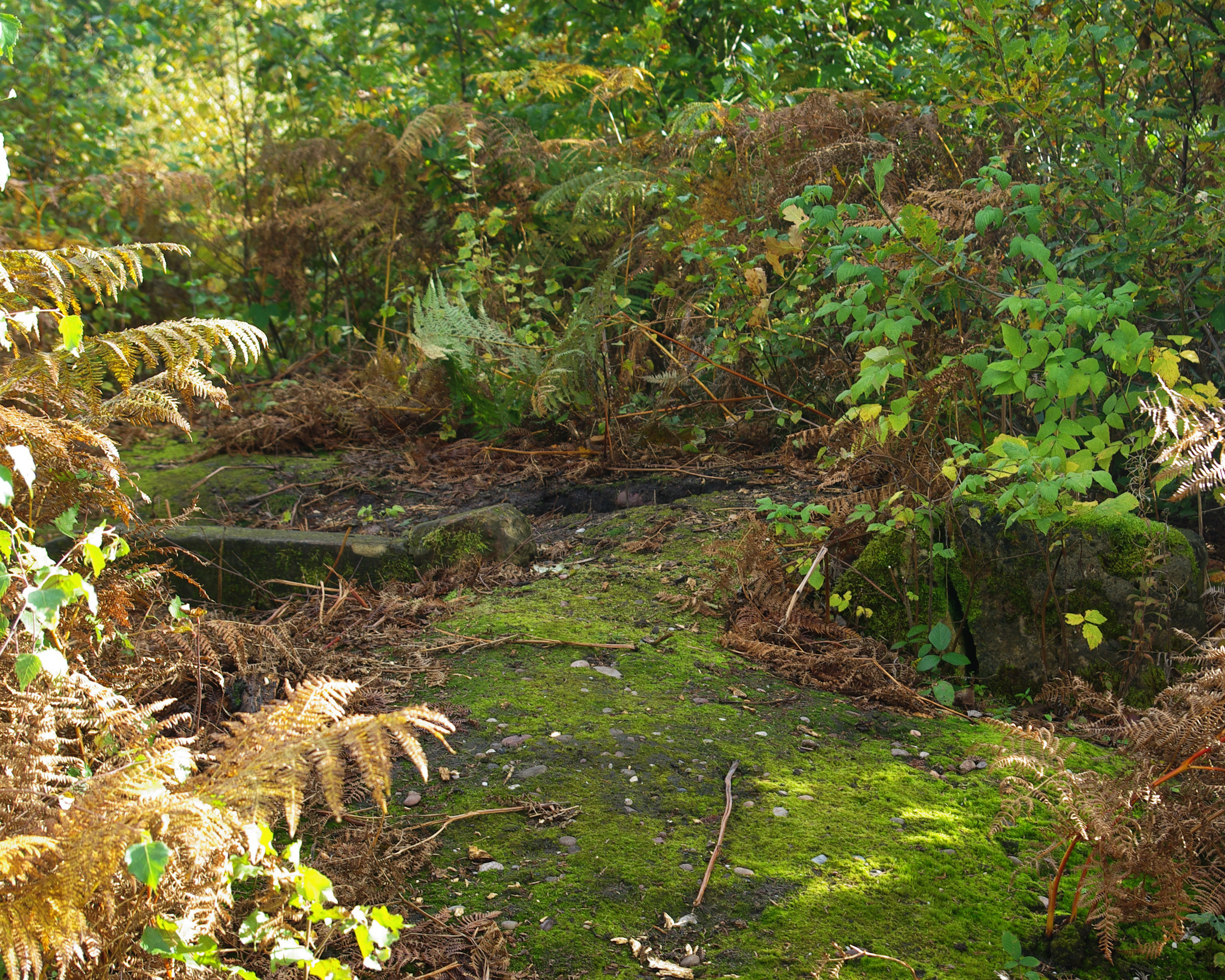
Stones at Thynghowe, Hanger Hill, Sherwood Forest

Thynghowe was an important Viking Age open-air assembly place or thing, located at Sherwood Forest, in Nottinghamshire, England. It was lost to history until its rediscovery in 2005 by the husband and wife team of Stuart Reddish and Lynda Mallett, local history enthusiasts.

The assembly mound is at Hanger Hill, (Note: The name changed and evolved over time: Þing-haugr - (Old Norse) c. 9th-10th cent.; Thing-haugr; Thynghowe; hynger howe; Hanger Hill - c. 17th cent.; Thynghowe - rediscovered 2005) close to a parish boundary stone. (Note: The boundary stone marks out where three parish boundaries meet: Perlethorpe Cum Budby CP; Edwinstowe CP; Warsop CP; Magic Map: Hanger Hill, Sherwood Forest: Overview map of parish boundaries (1:50,000); Detail map of Hanger Hill (1:5,000)) As a result of continued research, Thynghowe is now included on the English Historic England Archive.

== Name ==
=== Toponym ===
- The mound where the assembly meet (Note: Old Norse Þing-haugr: "The mound where the assembly meet": Old Norse Þing: "assembly"; Old Norse haugr: "mound")

Thynghowe: (Thyng..howe)

The first element 'Thyng' is from Old Norse ' Þing ' - ("thing") ("assembly place"). (Note: Old Norse Þing: "assembly place") (Note: Old Norse Þing is pronounced "thing", see Thing, British Isles)

The next element ' howe ' is from Old Norse ' haugr ' ("mound" or "grave-mound" ). (Note: Old Norse haugr: "mound" or "grave-mound")

=== Name history ===
The name changed and evolved over time :

- Þing-haugr - (Old Norse) c. 9-10th century (Note: The "mycel hæþen here" (Great Heathen Army) over wintered at Torksey (near Lincoln) AD 872-3 This was probably the first opportunity for the Danes to discover the Sherwood Forest area. The distance from Torksey to Edwinstowe is about 19 miles via A6075 ( Google ).)
- Thing-haugr (Note: Old Norse Þing is pronounced ” thing ” , see Thing, British Isles)
- Thynghowe (Note: In 2011, English Heritage inspected the site, and confirmed it was known as "Thynghowe" in 1334 and 1609.)
- hynger howe (Note: People of Celtic origin found the ' Þ ' of the Old Norse language ( pronounced ” th ” ) difficult, hence words that began ' th ' were often shortened to begin with just ' t ' or ' h ' (e.g. Number three - "tree"))
- Hanger Hill - c. 17th century
- Thynghowe - rediscovered 2005 (Note: It was lost to history until its rediscovery in 2005 by the husband and wife team Lynda Mallett and Stuart Reddish)

== History ==
The site lies amidst the old oaks of an area known as the Birklands in Sherwood Forest. Experts believe it may also yield clues as to the boundary of the ancient Anglo Saxon kingdoms of Mercia and Northumbria. (Note: In the year AD 942 the Anglo-Saxon Chronicle reported that, following the military conquest of Danish Mercia by Eadmond, a new boundary existed between the lands of the Norse kings and of Eadmond .... on a very ancient line dividing the historical Mercia from Deira .... . . the Eastern Peak District . . .. . . the Western fringe of Sherwood Forest . . .. . . the River Humber . . .)

It functioned as a place where people came to resolve disputes and settle issues.

The name Thynghowe is of Old Norse origin, although the site may be older than the Danelaw, perhaps even Bronze Age. The word howe often indicates the presence of a prehistoric burial mound. (Note: Old Norse haugr: "mound" or "grave-mound")

The thyng or thing was historically the governing assembly in Germanic peoples (Note: Tacitus portrayed the Germanic tribal assembly as both a legislative and decision-making body...) and was introduced into some Celtic societies as well. It was made up of the free people of the community and presided over by law-speakers.

== Sources ==
=== Online ===
- Gaunt, Andy (Jun. 30, 2011). A Topographic Earthwork Survey of Thynghowe, Hanger Hill, Nottinghamshire. NCA-016.
- Stuart Reddish & Lynda Mallett: According to Ancient Custom: Research on the possible Origins and Purpose of Thynghowe Sherwood Forest

=== Books ===
- Adams, Max (2017). Aelfred's Britain: War and Peace in the Viking Age. Head of Zeus. ISBN 9781784080310.
- Williams, Thomas (2017). Viking Britain - A History. William Collins Books. ISBN 978-0-00-817195-7.
- Higham, Nicholas J.; Ryan, Martin J. (2015). The Anglo-Saxon World. Yale University Press. ISBN 978-0-300-21613-4.
- Arthur, Ross G. (2002). English-Old Norse Dictionary pdf. In Parentheses Publications.
- Reaney, P H (1969). The Origin of English Place Names. Routledge & Kegan Paul.

== Related reading ==
- Community archaeology at Thynghowe, Birklands, Sherwood Forest by Lynda Mallett, Stuart Reddish, John Baker, Stuart Brookes and Andy Gaunt.Transactions of the Thoroton Society of Nottinghamshire, Volume 116 (2012)
- Olwyn Owen (ed.) (2012) Things in the Viking World (Shetland Amenity Trust) ISBN 978-0956569882
