= Time Team series 4 =

Time Team
- Season 4
- No. of episodes: 6

Release
- Original network: Channel 4
- Original release: 5 January – 9 February 1997

Series chronology
- ← Previous; Series 3 Next → Series 5

This is a list of Time Team episodes from series 4.

== Episode ==
=== Series 4 ===
Episode # refers to the air date order. The Time Team Specials are aired in between regular episodes, but are omitted from this list. Regular contributors on Time Team include: Tony Robinson (presenter); archaeologists Mick Aston, Phil Harding, Carenza Lewis; Beric Morley (historic buildings); Robin Bush (historian); Victor Ambrus (illustrator); Stewart Ainsworth (landscape investigator); John Gater, Chris Gaffney (geophysicists); Henry Chapman (surveyor); Sue Francis (graphics); Mark Corney (Roman expert).

No. overall	No. in season	Title	Location	Coordinates	Original release date
16	1	"Episode One (Maryland, USA)"	St. Mary's City, Maryland, United States	38.189167°N 76.432222°W	5 January 1997
Recorded between 17 and 19 May 1996, the team go to St. Mary's City in Maryland to work with American archaeologists to look for evidence of the city founded by English colonists in 1634. Different archaeological styles between American and British addressed, with the Time Team conducting geophys onsite for the first time. Finds: two buildings, including fort.
17	2	"Episode Two (Mystery of the Cornish Skeletons)"	Launceston, Cornwall	50.639822°N 4.334246°W	12 January 1997
Filmed between 22 and 24 March 1996. A local landowner has discovered human bones while installing water pipes. It is known to be the site of a former leper hospital, and a major crossing between Devon and Cornwall. How much more can Time Team discover about it? Phil uncovers a complete skeleton which has received a Christian burial, and which Osteoarchaeologist Margaret Cox identifies as a young adult female. She also examines the bone fragments for signs of leprosy. Juliet Griffin makes a herbal poultice to dress the lepers' wounds. Robin Bush looks at the 13th century charter granted to the hospital.
18	3	"Steam-Powered Mint"	Soho, Birmingham	52.498633°N 1.923911°W	19 January 1997
Recorded between 5 and 7 April 1996, this episode sees the team try to discover what remains of Matthew Boulton's Soho Manufactory, an important factory and home to the world's first steam-powered mint, during the Industrial Revolution. They are joined by industrial archaeologist George Demidowicz.
19	4	"8th Century Church"	Govan, Glasgow	55.864368°N 4.312815°W	26 January 1997
Filmed from 14 to 16 June 1996, in this episode the team try to find out why the graveyard of a 19th century church features large tortoise-shaped gravestones dating back to the Dark Ages. The team are joined by Scottish prehistorian Anna Ritchie and archaeologist Steve Driscoll.
20	5	"Norman and Medieval Castles"	Malton, North Yorkshire	54.134507°N 0.792469°W	2 February 1997
Recorded between 5 and 7 July 1996, the team try to discover a medieval castle and a Jacobean mansion. Barry Scott (bladesmith) makes a sword using traditional techniques, and the Conquest Society demonstrates hand-to-hand combat with authentic armour and chainmail.
21	6	"Roman Villa"	Netheravon, Wiltshire	51.232406°N 1.789822°W	9 February 1997
Filmed from 2 to 4 August 1996, this episode looks for a Roman villa that was first partially discovered 90 years before by William Hawley. Part of the site—a former army barracks—is covered in concrete, which at least protects what is underneath. But as they don't know exactly where the villa is, it could be a problem for both the diggers and the geophysics team. The team are joined by Duncan Coe (county archaeologist), Mark Corney (Roman buildings expert) and Lindsay Allason Jones (Roman finds). At the end of day two Lindsay supervises an al fresco Roman-style meal. By day three they have the bare outline of a very substantial, high-status building complete with mosaic floors and central heating. But then the time runs out.
