= Penthouse Suite =

Penthouse Suite may refer to:

- A penthouse suite or penthouse apartment.
- Penthouse Suite, a song in the album Aristocrunk
- Penthouse Suite, an album by the James Taylor Quartet
- The Penthouse Suite, a piece by Syd Dale

== See also ==
- Penthouse (disambiguation)
- Suite (disambiguation)
