= Chapel House, Plympton =

House in Plymouth, Devon, England

Chapel House
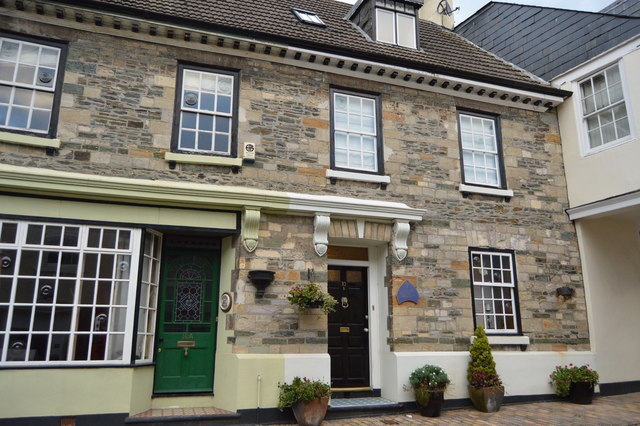
- The building in 2016

- Location within Devon Chapel House, Plympton (England)

General information
- Location: 10a and 10b Fore Street, Plympton, Devon, England
- Coordinates: 50.3829°N 4.0477°W
- Completed: mid-18th century

Technical details
- Floor count: 3

Chapel House is a Grade II listed building in Plympton, Devon, England. Standing at 10a and 10b Fore Street, Plympton's main street, it is believed to have originally been a town house, later developed into a shop with attached house. It dates to the mid-18th century, but contains older remnants.

It is constructed of Killas rubble with limestone dressings. There are keystoned flat arches that are original to the ground-floor doorways.

Although its interior has not been inspected by Historic England, it was evaluated by Time Team in 1999. In the episode, architectural historian Beric Morley discovered, in the kitchen, a late 15th- or early 16th-century slack-head doorway made of granite moorstone that had been "laboriously carved" into a moulding. In the long part of the building's L-shape, he found a window of similar style and age. In the attic, an arched braced roof was shown, the particular style being a West Country special that existed from the end of the 14th century through into the 16th century. A dendochronology sampling dated the timbers to around 1470.

Number 10b is now known as Becket House.
