= Bawsey =

Village and civil parish in the English county of Norfolk

Coordinates: 52.749°N 0.487°E

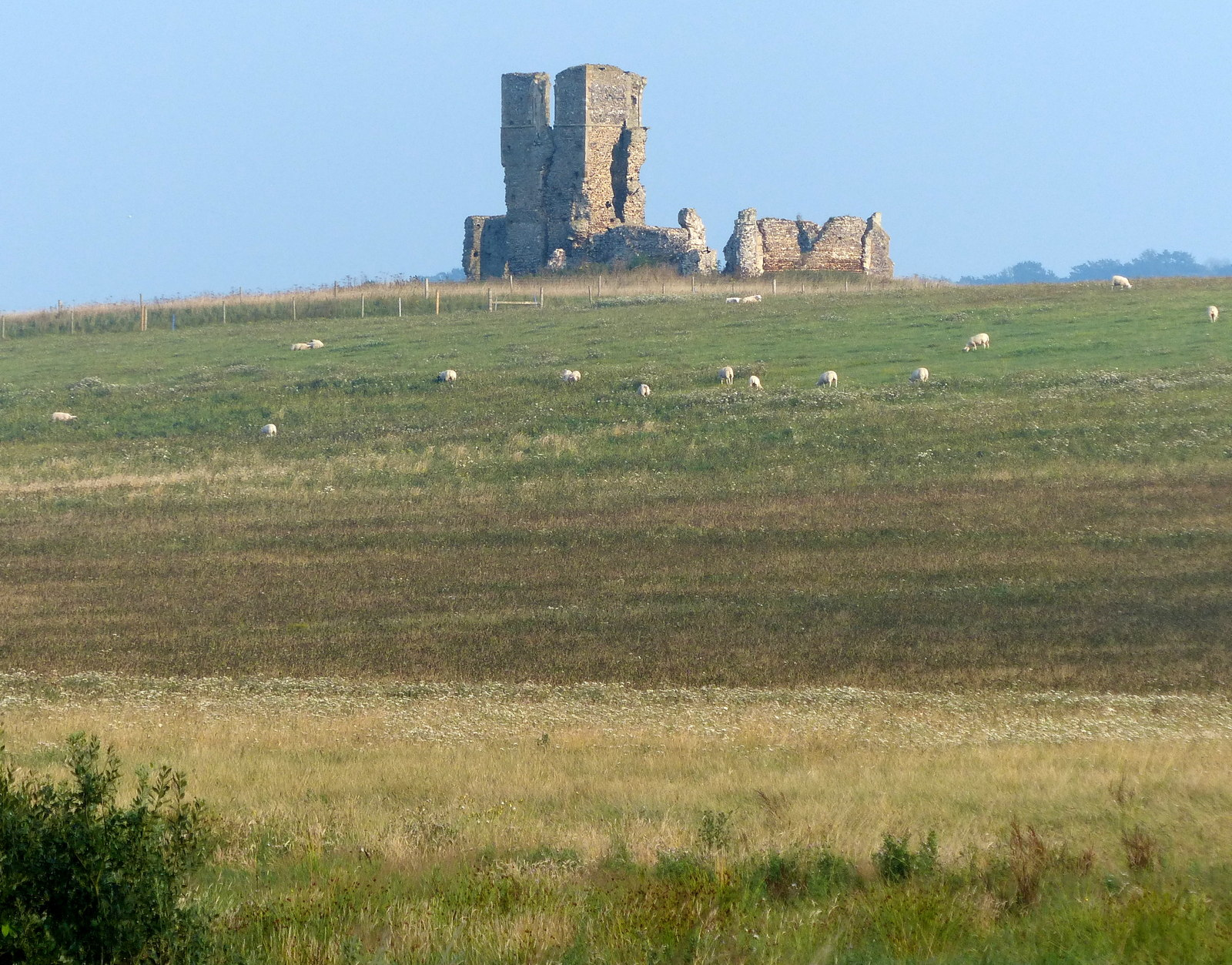
- The ruins of St James' Church

- Location within Norfolk
- Area: 6.81 km^{2} (2.63 sq mi)
- Population: 216 (2011)
  - Density: 32/km^{2} (83/sq mi)
- OS grid reference: TF680198
- Civil parish: Bawsey
- District: King's Lynn and West Norfolk
- Shire county: Norfolk
- Region: East
- Country: England
- Sovereign state: United Kingdom
- Post town: KING'S LYNN
- Postcode district: PE32
- Police: Norfolk
- Fire: Norfolk
- Ambulance: East of England

Bawsey is a village and civil parish in the English county of Norfolk. The village is about 4 miles (6.4 km) east of the town of King's Lynn and 40 miles (64 km) west of the city of Norwich. The village sits astride of the B1145 King's Lynn to Mundesley road that dissects North Norfolk west to east.

The civil parish has an area of 6.81 square kilometres (2.63 sq mi) and in the 2011 census had a population of 216 in 105 households. For the purposes of local government, the parish falls within the district of King's Lynn and West Norfolk. It forms part of the North West Norfolk constituency in the House of Commons. Norfolk County Council is responsible for roads, some schools, and social services.

The church was dedicated to St James and has been in ruins since at least 1745. The building and its surrounding area were the subject of a live dig by the Time Team programme in 1998. They determined it started life as a monastic settlement before becoming the parochial church of Bawsey; also during the weekend dig, the Norman arch under the former central tower was restored after it had collapsed some years before.

== See also ==
- Bawsey SSSI
