= Time Team series 2 =

Time Team
- Series 2
- Starring: Tony Robinson; Mick Aston; Phil Harding; Robin Bush; Victor Ambrus
- No. of episodes: 5

Release
- Original network: Channel 4
- Original release: 8 January – 5 February 1995

Series chronology
- ← Previous; Series 1 Next → Series 3

This is a list of Time Team episodes from series 2.

== Episode ==
=== Series 2 ===
Episode # refers to the air date order. The Time Team Specials are aired in between regular episodes, but are omitted from this list. Regular contributors on Time Team include: Tony Robinson (presenter); Mick Aston, Phil Harding, Carenza Lewis, Mark Horton (archaeologists); Robin Bush (historian); Victor Ambrus (illustrator); Stewart Ainsworth (landscape investigator); John Gater, Chris Gaffney (geophysics).

No. overall	No. in season	Title	Location	Coordinates	Original release date
5	1	"Lord of the Isles"	Finlaggan, Islay	55.834867°N 6.171225°W	8 January 1995
Recorded between 24 and 26 June 1994, the team helps the National Museums of Scotland to search for the secrets of Finlaggan, the centre of the kingdom of the Lord of the Isles. Finds: Neolithic sites dating to 6000 BCE. Experimental demonstration: Scottish padded linen armor.
6	2	"The Saxon Graves"	Winterbourne Gunner, Wiltshire	51.115883°N 1.740619°W	15 January 1995
Recorded between 6 and 8 May 1994, in "The Saxon Graves" the team excavate a Saxon burial ground in a Wiltshire village which is situated on a building site owned by developer, David Buckland. Until all the graves have been mapped he is unable to continue with the development. They are joined by osteoarchaeologist Margaret Cox, archaeologists Peter Cox and Helena Cave-Penney, and conservator Meg Brooks; while blacksmith Ivor Lawton forges a Saxon blade from alternate leaves of steel and iron. And the team get excited about possible prehistoric activity. Finds: Additional Saxon-era graves, Bronze Age cremation urn. Experimental demonstration: Saxon knife-making.
7	3	"The Lost Villa"	Tockenham, Wiltshire	51.512439°N 1.944539°W	22 January 1995
Recorded between 23 and 25 April 1994, the team try to discover why a 15th century village church has a small pagan Roman statue embedded within its walls. The first two days were spent in conflict with English Heritage, so no significant finds were made. Experimental demonstration: Roman mosaic floor.
8	4	"The Archbishop's Back Garden"	Lambeth Palace, London	51.496999°N 0.118650°W	29 January 1995
Recorded between 8 and 10 July 1994, in this episode the team try to determine whether the Roman road into London crossed the Thames at Lambeth or Tower Bridge, and if Lambeth or the City was the site of the first Roman settlement. Find: Roman road route rediscovered. Experimental demonstration: road-building.
9	5	"Medieval Dining Hall"	Hylton Castle, Sunderland	54.92253°N 1.44318°W	5 February 1995
Recorded between 10 and 12 June 1994, the episode focuses on Hylton Castle, now in the middle of a Sunderland housing estate, and how extensive the castle originally was. Finds: Flemish floor tiles in situ, later 16th-century building that overlooked gardens. Experimental demonstration: life in medieval times.
