= Penthouse =

Penthouse most often refers to:

- Penthouse apartment, a special apartment on the top floor of a building
- Penthouse (magazine), a British-founded men's magazine
- Mechanical penthouse, a floor, typically located directly under a flat roof, that houses mechanical equipment

Penthouse may also refer to:

== Film and television ==
- Penthouse (film), a 1933 American film
- The Penthouse (1967 film), a British film directed by Peter Collinson
- The Penthouse (1989 film), an American-Canadian television film directed by David Greene
- The Penthouse (2010 film), an American film directed by Chris Levitus
- Penthouse (Australian TV series), a 1960–1961 daytime interview show
- Penthouse (Mexican TV series), a 1973 telenovela
- The Penthouse: War in Life, a 2020–2021 television series
- Penthouse HDTV, a TV channel

== Music ==
- Penthouse (album), a 1995 album by Luna
- The Penthouse (Seattle), a 1960s jazz club in Seattle, Washington, US
- Penthouse Records, a Jamaican record label
- The Penthouse (album), 2025 album by Michael Medrano

== See also ==
- The Penthouse Club, a 1970–1978 Australian TV variety programme
- Pentheus, mythological king of Thebes
- The Pent House, listed building in Plympton, Devon, England
