= Bawsey SSSI =

Geological Site of Special Scientific Interest east of Kings' Lynn in Norfolk

Coordinates: 52.746°N 0.487°E

- Site of Special Scientific Interest
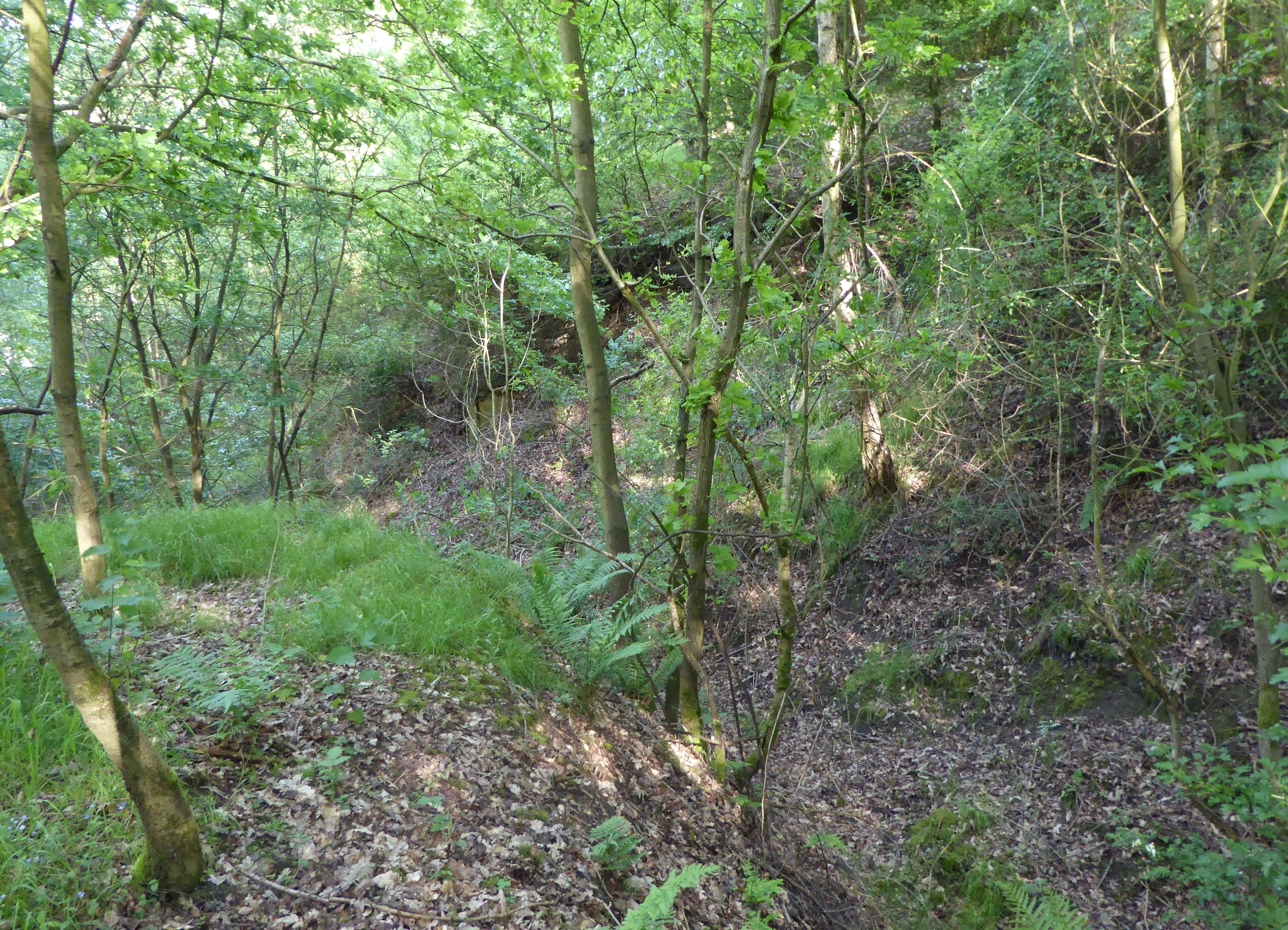
- Location of Bawsey SSSI.
- Area of search: Norfolk, England
- Grid reference: TF 680 194
- Interest: Geological
- Area: 2.6 hectares (6.4 acres)
- Notification date: 1992
- Location map: Magic Map

Bawsey is a 2.6-hectare (6.4-acre) geological Site of Special Scientific Interest in the parish of Bawsey, east of King's Lynn in Norfolk, England. It is a Geological Conservation Review site.

This site has Quaternary till, unsorted glacial sediments, with a depth of up to 5 m (16 ft). It is separated from the main East Anglian till sheet, and it is the type site for the Bawsey Calcareous Till.

The site is private land with no public access.
