= Tockenham =

Village in Wiltshire, England

Coordinates: 51.513°N 1.945°W

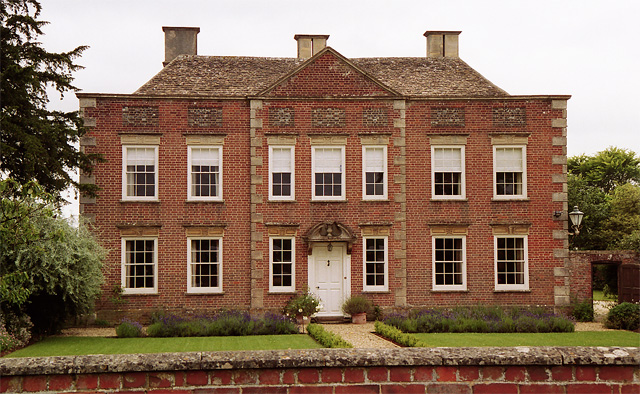
- Meadow Court, Tockenham

- Location within Wiltshire
- Population: 238 (in 2011)
- OS grid reference: SU039793
- Unitary authority: Wiltshire
- Ceremonial county: Wiltshire
- Region: South West
- Country: England
- Sovereign state: United Kingdom
- Post town: Swindon
- Postcode district: SN4
- Dialling code: 01793
- Police: Wiltshire
- Fire: Dorset and Wiltshire
- Ambulance: South Western
- UK Parliament: Chippenham
- Website: Parish Council

Tockenham is a village and civil parish in north Wiltshire, England. The village is about 1.2 miles (1.9 km) east of Lyneham and 3 miles (5 km) southwest of the town of Royal Wootton Bassett. The parish includes the hamlet of Tockenham Wick.

== Roman villa ==
A Roman villa a short distance north of the present village was the subject of an episode of the archaeological television programme Time Team, broadcast in 1995. As a result of their geophysical survey, sample trenches and environmental core samples, the site was subsequently scheduled to give it legal protection.

Historic England interpret the evidence of structures as a multi-phase Romano-British farmyard villa, including a domestic range with an apsidal-ended room and an enclosed farmyard with an octagonal structure at its entrance. Based on pottery finds, the site was occupied from the mid 2nd century to the late 4th century. Although no complete mosaic floors were found, tesserae and painted plaster were found in some numbers, suggesting a major building phase in the 4th century.

== Later history ==
The Domesday Book of 1086 recorded 17 households in the area.

The 12.5-acre (5 ha) Tockenham Reservoir, about 0.6 miles (1 km) west of Tockenham Wick, was formed in c.1810 by damming a minor watercourse in order to supply the Wilts & Berks Canal. It fell out of use when the canal was abandoned in 1914 and is now operated as a fishery.

A Free School was built at Tockenham in 1844, and became a National School in the 1870s. Children of all ages were taught until 1926, when the school closed owing to falling numbers. The school was reopened for wartime reasons from December 1940 to the autumn of 1946; subsequently the building became a private house.

The parish was enlarged in 1969 by the transfer of 193 acres (78 ha) from Lyneham. Until then, the boundary between the two parishes ran along the main street of Tockenham village and the area to the west was known as West Tockenham, reflecting a separate estate which was probably established in the later 14th century. The change also brought Tockenham Court Farm into the parish, as well as half of Tockenham reservoir.

A detailed parish history was published by the Wiltshire Victoria County History as part of its volume IX, Kingsbridge hundred (1970).

== Parish church ==
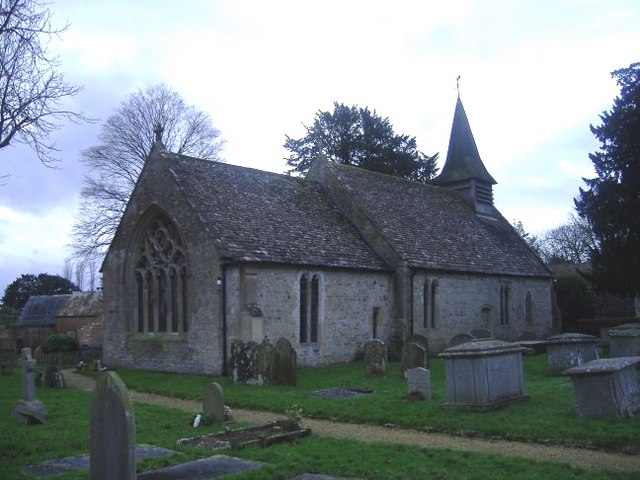
St Giles's church, Tockenham

The small Grade II* listed Church of England parish church is dedicated to St Giles and was first recorded in 1276. The dedication is, however, only from the beginning of the 20th century, and the church was originally dedicated to Saint John the Evangelist.

The building is in limestone rubble with ashlar quoins. 13th-century work can be seen in the trefoil designs of a window on the south side of the nave, and another on the north side. The roof of the three-bay nave is from the 15th or 16th century, and the south porch was probably added in the 16th or 17th. The church was lightly restored in 1876, when the 13th-century east window was replaced and the bell-turret with shingled spire was added, standing on older posts. There was further work in 1908.

Julian Orbach, updating Nikolaus Pevsner's work, writes: "Charming rustic interior with the timber-framed W end". The font bowl is from the 12th century. The pulpit and pews of 1907–8 were designed by Harold Brakspear, reusing 18th-century panelling from Tockenham Court. The single bell was made in Bristol around 1480. Monuments in the church include an elaborate marble memorial on the chancel wall to Mary Smith (died 1726), and in the nave a multi-coloured marble tablet to Goddard Smith and family, 1691.

Built into the south wall of the church is a well-preserved Roman statue. At one time thought to be St Christopher, it was later claimed to be Aesculapius. In 1978 Jocelyn Toynbee identified it as a Genius loci statue, a pre-Christian Roman religious item, assumed to be from the nearby villa complex. The church walls contain a number of Roman dressed stones and tiles amongst the medieval masonry.

The benefices of Tockenham, Lyneham and Bradenstoke-cum-Clack were united in 1924, although the parishes remained separate. In 1954, Tockenham was separated and was to be held in plurality with Clyffe Pypard; the two benefices were united in 1973. Today Tockenham is part of the Lyneham and Woodhill benefice, a group of six neighbouring churches. Parish registers survive for the following periods: christenings 1653–1991, marriages 1655–1999, burials 1653–1992.

== Other notable buildings ==
North-east of the church, Queen's Court farmhouse is an 18th-century building on the site of an earlier moated house.

Down the lane leading west to Tockenham Court farm is Manor House farmhouse, 18th-century with 15th-century core. Nearby is Meadow Court (previously Tockenham House), a country house. Its seven-bay brick front, built in 1730 by Nathaniel Ireson, has a parapet and a plain three-bay pediment. At the rear are parts of a c.1630 building and 20th-century additions, and there is a separate former coach house from the early 18th century.

At the end of the lane and surrounded by modern farm buildings, Tockenham Court farmhouse is an L-shaped building from the 16th and 17th centuries, remodelled in the 18th century and extended in the 19th. During the Civil War, when it was the residence of Sir William Button (1584–1655), this house was twice looted by Parliamentary troops. A GWR 2900 Class steam locomotive named Tockenham Court was built in 1913 and continued in service until 1952.

At Tockenham Wick, 1 mile (2 km) north of the village on the lane to Grittenham, the Manor House is Grade II* listed. It was built c.1600 in limestone rubble with ashlar quoins. The two-storey porch is dated 1698, and a large single-storey brick-built library was added to the right of the main block c.1750. The house was much extended in 1904 and 1912, the latter designed by Harold Brakspear; the additions match the style of the original. 17th-century panelling and overmantel in the parlour may be original, along with the good 18th-century fireplace in the library.

The adjoining dovecote, with stables below, were built in limestone and sandstone rubble in the 17th century; Brakspear inserted mullioned windows in 1925. Just to the north is a stable block from the 1770s, in brick with a lunette window. Brakspear also designed a summerhouse, south-west of the house, called "pretty" by Orbach. At the roadside is a 16th-century thatched barn with 20th-century brick infilling.

== See also ==
- List of Roman villas in England
