= Time Team pilot =

- Series Pilot
- Starring: Tony Robinson; Mick Aston; Phil Harding; Robin Bush; Victor Ambrus
- No. of episodes: 1

Release
- Original network: Unaired

Additional information
- Filming dates: 1992

Season chronology
- Next → Series 1

The pilot episode of the British programme Time Team has never been aired. It was produced in 1992, and copies of the pilot have since been lost. Only one clip of the pilot is known to exist.

== Episode ==
=== Pilot ===
Episode # refer to the number in air date order which includes the specials episode which broadcast in between regular episodes

No. overall	No. in season	Title	Location	Coordinates	Original release date
0	0	"Pilot"	Dorchester, Oxfordshire	51.643934°N 1.165309°W	Unaired
The team go to Dorchester in Oxfordshire, where they look into three sites. The first site is under an allotment where users have been finding pottery and human bone, secondly they look for a cathedral built 1350 years ago and lastly a field where some unusual finds have been discovered.

== See also ==
- Time Team Live
- Time Team History Hunters
- Time Team Digs
- Time Team Extra
- Time Team America
- Time Team Specials
- Time Team Others
