= 24 Fore Street, Plympton =

Building in Plymouth, Devon, England

24 Fore Street
- Location within Devon 24 Fore Street, Plympton (England)

General information
- Location: 24 Fore Street, Plympton, Devon, England
- Coordinates: 50.3830°N 4.0485°W
- Completed: late 18th century

Technical details
- Floor count: 2

24 Fore Street is a Grade II listed building in Plympton, Devon, England. Standing on Plympton's main street, it dates to the late 18th century.

Although its interior has not been inspected by Historic England, it was evaluated by Time Team in 1999. In the episode, architectural historian Beric Morley discovered a large timber lintel spanning a fireplace. A dendochronology sampling dated the timber's felling date (but not the date it was inserted into the fireplace) to around 1290.
