= Time Team series 1 =

Time Team
- Series 1
- Starring: Tony Robinson; Mick Aston; Phil Harding; Robin Bush; Victor Ambrus
- No. of episodes: 4

Release
- Original network: Channel 4
- Original release: 16 January – 6 February 1994

Series chronology
- ← Previous; Pilot Next → Series 2

This is a list of Time Team episodes from series 1.

== Episode ==
=== Series 1 ===
Episode # refers to the air date order. The Time Team Specials are aired in between regular episodes, but are omitted from this list. Regular contributors on the Time Team include Tony Robinson (presenter), Mick Aston, Phil Harding, Carenza Lewis, Victor Ambrus (illustrator), Robin Bush (historian) and John Gater (geophysicist).

No. overall	No. in season	Title	Location	Coordinates	Original release date
1	1	"The Guerrilla Base of the King"	Athelney, Somerset	51.059011°N 2.936678°W	16 January 1994
Recorded between 16 and 18 April 1993, this episode's dig tries to find evidence of what the site's settlement looked like in the time of Alfred the Great, focusing on the search for Alfred's Athelney Abbey and fort. Finds: Geophysics plot of cathedral.
2	2	"On the Edge of an Empire"	Ribchester, Lancashire	53.811145°N 2.532268°W	23 January 1994
Recorded between 3 and 5 September 1993, "On the Edge of an Empire" looks into Ribchester's Roman history. Finds: earlier turf-built phase of Roman fort preceding the stone fort, Punic (defensive) ditch. Experimental demonstration: Digging of defensive ditch.
3	3	"The New Town of a Norman Prince"	Much Wenlock, Shropshire	52.595906°N 2.557250°W	30 January 1994
Recorded between 9 and 11 April 1993 (which makes it the first put on film), this episode tries to discover why Much Wenlock grew into a busy medieval market town. Finds: 13th century baronial hall inside an existing building.
4	4	"The Fortress in the Lake"	Llangorse Lake, Powys	51.933672°N 3.268508°W	6 February 1994
Recorded between 16 and 18 September 1993, the team tries to discover what happened to a Dark Ages palace located on a man-made island in the middle of a lake. Finds: Shale finger ring from 9th-10th century. Experimental demonstration: Dark Age boatbuilding.
