= The Pent House =

Listed building in Devon, England

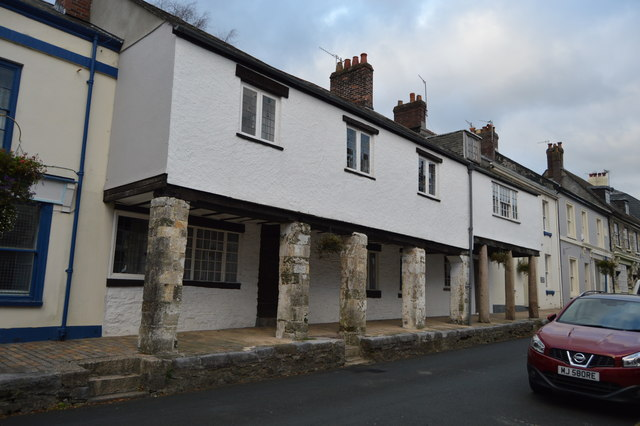
- The building in 2016

- Location within Devon The Pent House (England)

General information
- Location: 20 Fore Street, Plympton, England
- Coordinates: 50.3830°N 4.0482°W
- Completed: 17th century

Technical details
- Floor count: 2

The Pent House is a Grade II listed building in Plympton, Devon, England. Standing at 20 Fore Street, Plympton's main street, it dates to the 17th century and is believed to have originally been merchants' houses or tenements of cottages. It is now one property.

It has rubble walls, except for the deeply projecting first floor, which is render and likely timber framed.

Although its interior has not been inspected by Historic England, it was evaluated by Time Team in 1999. In the episode, architectural historian Beric Morley discovered, in what would have been the back of the building in mediaeval times, a large timber lintel spanning a fireplace that was likely original to the 17th-century construction. A dendochronology sampling dated the timber's felling date (but not the date it was inserted into the fireplace) to around 1290.
