= Capocorb Vell =

Archaeological site on Mallorca, Spain

Coordinates: 39.3976°N 2.8241°E

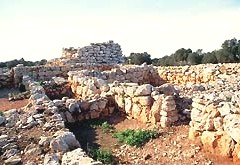
Capocorb Vell

Capocorb Vell is a talayotic site located about 12 kilometres (7 mi) from Llucmajor on the island of Mallorca, in Spain. It is one of the most highly excavated talayotic sites in the Balearic Islands. A similar site is Ses Païsses.

There are several talayots to the North-East of the main site, which is reminiscent of the (accidental or intentional) southwest to northeast alignment of Son Oleza.

== Gallery ==
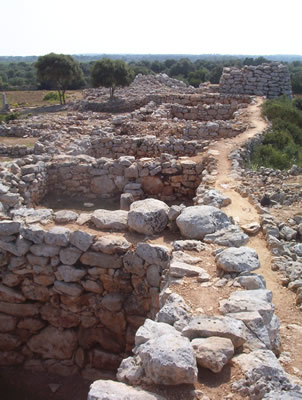
Capocorb Vell Rundgang

== Bibliography ==
- Javier Aramburu u.a. (1994), "Guía Arquelógica de Mallorca", La Foradada (in German), ISBN 84-7651-227-9
