= Olwyn Owen =

British archaeologist

Olwyn Owen FSA Scot
- Education: BA at Durham University and MA at Durham University
- Occupation: Archaeologist
- Known for: Expert in Viking history of Scotland

Olwyn Owen, FSA Scot, is a British archaeologist and academic specialising in Scandinavian Scotland.

She is an expert in Viking material culture and has commented on the Galloway Hoard for National Geographic magazine.

She has excavated widely in Scotland and Scandinavia and has had a long career in various heritage management roles.

Owen is also an archaeological consultant and in March 2017, she was made Visiting Reader at Orkney College, University of Highlands and Islands.

== Education ==
She was awarded a BA in English from Durham University in 1976, during which time she also took archaeology classes under Rosemary Cramp.

In 1979, she completed her MA degree at Durham University, with a thesis on the English Urnes Style.

== Career ==
Owen has written extensively on Scandinavian links with Scotland and introduced audiences to Scotland's Viking past, for example, in her book Things in the Viking World (2012).

She appeared in the Time Team series 5 episode 3, at Sanday, Orkney, which aired on 18 January 1998.

== Selected works ==
- (1999) The Sea Road, Edinburgh, ISBN 0-86241-873-9.
- (1999) Scar: a Viking boat burial on Orkney (Tuckwell Press monograph; with Magnar Dalland)
- (1999) The Sea Road: a Viking voyage through Scotland (= The Making of Scotland series, Canongate).
- (1999) Kebister, Shetland: the four thousand year old story of one Shetland township (= Society of Antiquaries of Scotland monograph, 14; with C E Lowe).(2016) ‘A decorative mount from the Brough of Birsay, Orkney’, in Morris, C D (ed), The Birsay Bay Project 3.
- (2001) ‘The strange beast that is the English Urnes Style’, in Graham-Campbell, J, Hall, R, Jesch, J and Parsons, D N (eds), Vikings and the Danelaw, 203-22 (= Proceedings of the 13th Viking Congress, Oxbow).
- (2001) ‘The Southwell lintel, its style and significance’, in Graham-Campbell, J, Hall, R, Jesch, J and Parsons, D N (eds), Vikings and the Danelaw, 203-22 (= Proceedings of the 13th Viking Congress, Oxbow) (with Philip Dixon & David Stocker).(2016) Shetland and the Viking World: Papers from the Proceedings of the Seventeenth Viking Congress, Lerwick (eds Turner, V E, Owen, O A and Waugh, D J).
- (2002) ‘Sound Foundations: Archaeology in ’s towns and cities and the role of the Scottish Burgh Survey’, Antiquity 76 (2002), 802-807.
- (2002) ‘Inveresk and Historic Scotland: managing and protecting the archaeological remains’, in Bishop, M C (ed), Roman Inveresk: Past, Present and Future, 81-87. Armatvra Press.
- (2003) ‘Curiouser and curiouser: mysteries of Scar and Tuquoy, Orkney’, in Waugh, D J (ed), The Faces of Orkney: Stones, Skalds & Saints, 138-160 (= Scottish Society for Northern Studies, 11).
- (2004) ‘The Scar boat burial - and the missing decades of the early Viking Age in Orkney and Shetland’, in Adams, J & Holman, K (eds), Scandinavia and 800-1350, Contact, Conflict and Coexistence, 3-33 (= Medie Texts and Cultures of 4, Brepols).
- (2005) ‘A brief guide to saga sites to visit in Orkney’, in Owen, O (ed) The World of Orkneyinga Saga – ‘The Viking Broad-cloth Trip’, 224-231.
- (2005) ‘History, archaeology and Orkneyinga saga: the case of Tuquoy’, in Owen, O (ed) The World of Orkneyinga Saga – ‘The Viking Broad-cloth Trip’, 192-212.
- (2005) ‘’s Viking towns: a contradiction in terms?’, in Mortensen, A & Arge, S V (eds), Viking and Norse in the North Atlantic, 297-306 (= Proceedings of the 14th Viking Congress, Faroe Islands).
- (2011) ‘Norse influence at Govan on the Firth of Clyde, Scotland’, in Sigmundsson, S (ed), Viking Settlements and Viking Society, 333-46 (= Proceedings of the 16th Viking Congress, ) (with Stephen Driscoll).
- (2012) Things in the Viking World. Lerwick (edited by O Owen), Shetland Amenity Trust, ISBN 978-0956569882
- (2013) Viking Unst: Excavation and Survey in Northern Shetland 2006-2010. Lerwick (edited by O Owen).
- (2013) 'The legacy of the Viking Unst project', in Turner, V E, Bond, J M and Larsen, A-C, Viking Unst: Excavation and Survey in Northern Shetland 2006-2010, 234-52 (with V E Turner).
- (2015) 'Galloway's Viking treasure: the story of a discovery', British Archaeology, no 140 (Jan/Feb 2015), 16-23.
