= Gilbert Burroughes =

British potter

- Occupation: Potter

Gilbert Burroughes is a British potter, active since the 1950s. He became a specialist in reproducing samian ware.

He became interested in Roman pottery in late 1952 or early 1953, when he was a teenager. He had found parts of grey coarse ware on his father's farm. He took it to F. J. Watson, the father of a friend who was an amateur archaeologist in Wattisfield, Suffolk. Basil Brown had discovered around twenty Roman kilns in the area earlier in the 20th century. It was meeting Brown that forged Burroughes' interest in archaeology. He worked with Brown, including in a 1961 visit to Glebe Field in Suffolk. Burroughes became a member of Suffolk Institute of Archaeology and History's Suffolk Archaeology Field Group.

Burroughes' pottery business, Ambleside, was based in Chediston, Suffolk.

In 1999, he appeared in an episode of the British archaeology television programme Time Team during a visit to Papcastle in Cumbria. He recreated a samian ware bowl from a fragment found on-site.

In November 2009, Burroughes was elected a Fellow of the Society of Antiquaries of London.
