= Talaiot =

Bronze Age megalith found on Menorca and Mallorca

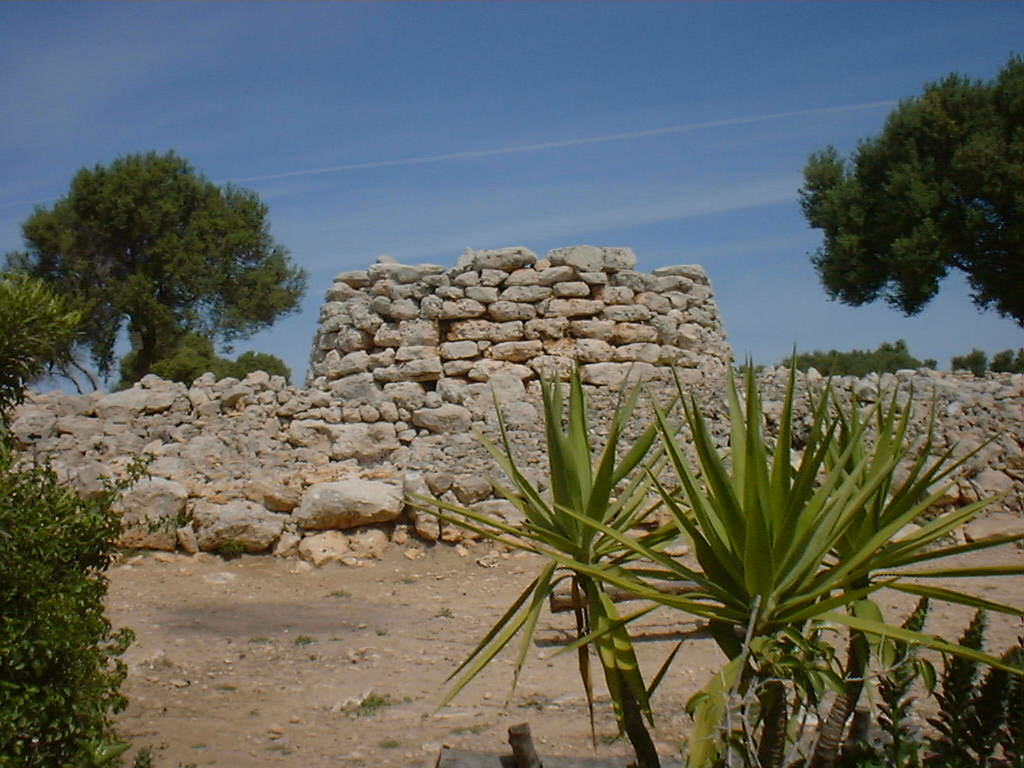
Talaiot in Capocorb Vell, Mallorca

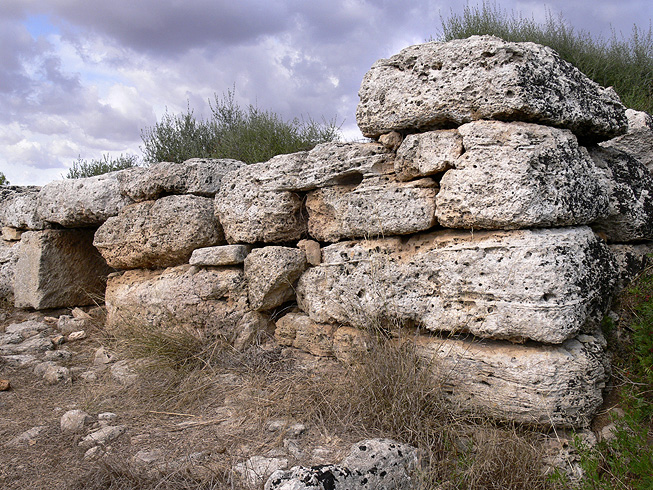
Talaiot at Son Serra, Mallorca

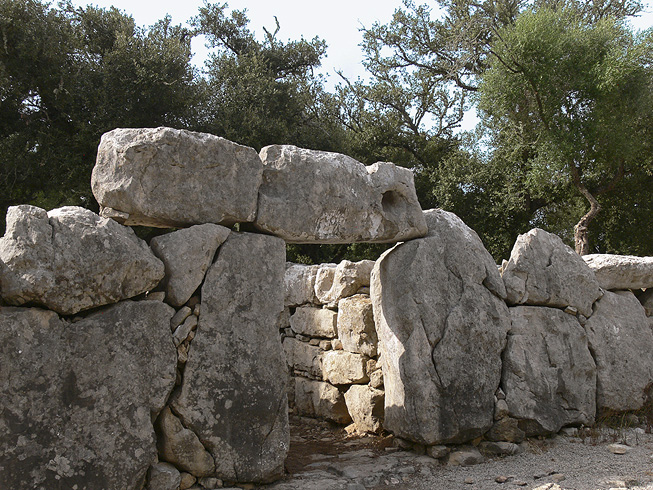
Main entrance to Ses Païsses talaiotic settlement, Mallorca

A talaiot, or talayot (Catalan pronunciation: [tələˈjɔt]), is a Bronze Age megalith found on the islands of Menorca and Mallorca forming part of the Talaiotic Culture or Talaiotic Period. Talaiots date back to the late second millennium and early first millennium BC. There are at least 274 of them, in, near, or related to Talaiotic settlements and the Talaiotic chamber tombs known as navetas. Talaiots pre-date the megalithic structures known as taulas, which are usually found nearby. While some Talaiots are thought to have had a defensive purpose, the use of others is not clearly understood. Some believe them to have served the purpose of lookout or signalling towers, as on Menorca, where they form a network. Talaiots generally take the form of circular or square buildings, and they may have been used as dwellings or meeting places. The talayots on Menorca have been much less prone to weathering than the ones found on Mallorca. Despite this, very few grave goods have been found in Menorcan talayots, leading historians to believe that the island had a poorer economy than its larger neighbor.

The first author to write about these structures was Juan Ramis in his book Celtic antiquities on the island of Menorca, which was published in 1818, and was the first book in the Spanish language entirely devoted to prehistory.

There are similar megalithic buildings found in other areas of the Western Mediterranean, though these are not necessarily related to talaiots. Examples include the "nuraghes" of Sardinia, the "torri" of Corsica, and the "sesi" of Pantelleria.

== Characteristics ==
The name "talayot" comes from the Catalan talaiot, which in turn derives from the Hispano-Arabic ṭaláya, meaning "watchtower," because, both in form and location, these monuments resemble watchtowers or defensive towers. Their construction technique, based on large stones fitted together "dry" (without cement or mortar), is currently known as the "cyclopean technique," in reference to the Mycenaean structures of Ancient Greece. This term should be distinguished from "megalithic," which refers to the works of various cultures that built dolmens.

On the island of Mallorca, most of the talayots fall into two clearly defined types: circular talayots and square talayots. The former are the most common; they have a circular floor plan, measure between eight and seventeen meters in diameter, and are usually oriented toward other monuments. Square talayots, on the other hand, have an approximately square floor plan, almost always with two of their walls aligned with the solstices or their lunar equivalents, and their dimensions are more precise—almost always between ten and eleven meters per side. Their spatial placement also sets them apart: while circular talayots can be found in settlements, isolated locations, or ceremonial centers, square talayots are almost always part of ceremonial centers. Both circular and square talayots have a single entrance—a corridor that passes through thick walls (up to four meters thick)—and an interior chamber with a central column.

== Chronology ==
There is considerable debate among researchers regarding the chronology of these structures. The following are the main proposals:

Lluís Plantalamor, partly following the chronological framework of G. Rosselló-Bordoy, suggests that the first talayots (heavily influenced by Sardinia, where the nuraghes are found) were built around 1500 BCE. This type of construction would have evolved over time, changing in both form and, likely, function.

A second proposal comes from a group of researchers at the Autonomous University of Barcelona. These scholars argue that the first talayotic manifestations appeared around 1000 BCE, contemporaneous with the final phases of the naviform structures.

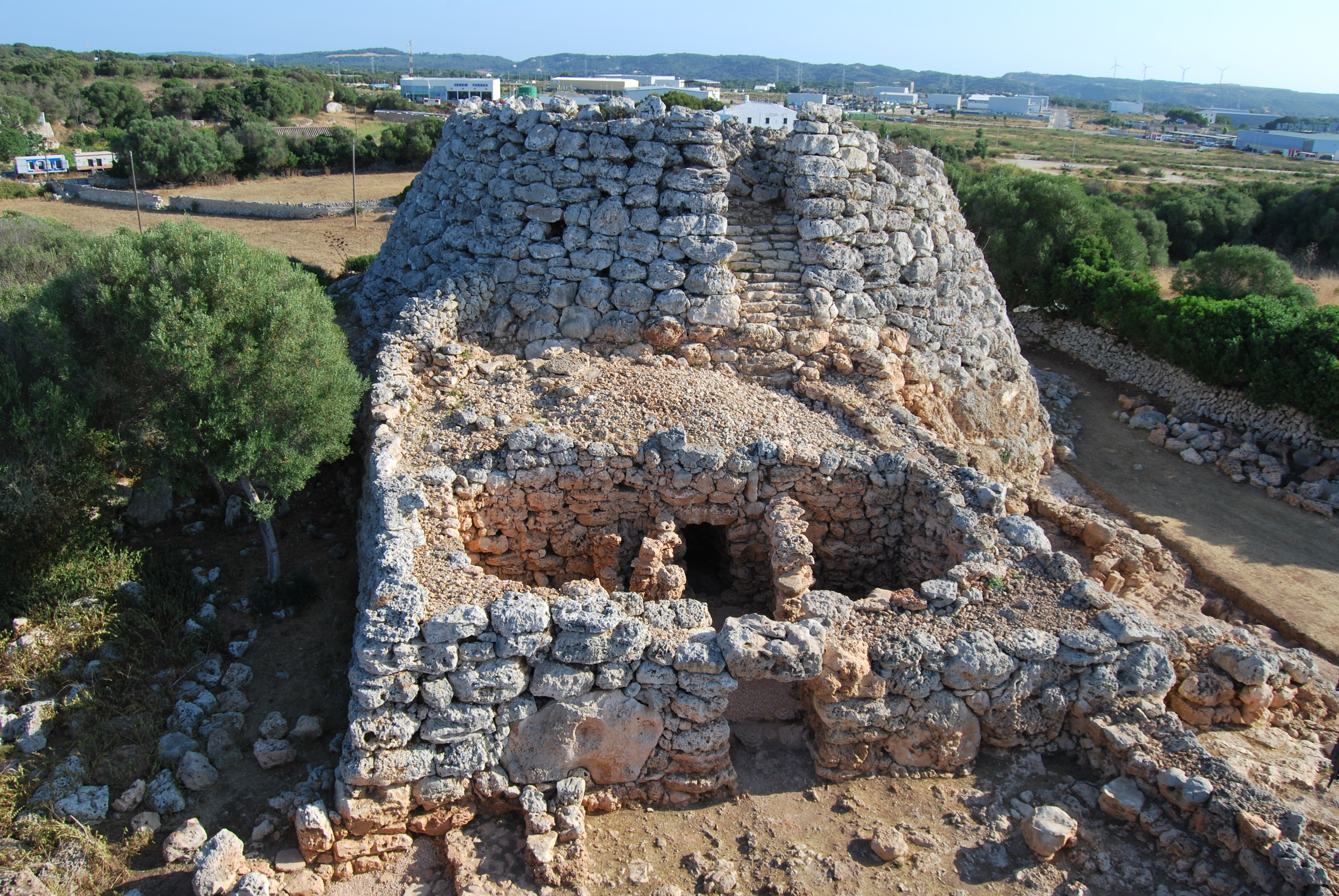
West talayot of Cornia Nou (Menorca)

The next proposal comes from the University of the Balearic Islands, where V. M. Guerrero, M. Calvo, and B. Salvà assert that Talayotic culture belongs to the Iron Age, and that the construction of talayots began in the 9th–8th centuries BCE.

Recently, archaeological work at the Menorcan site of Cornia Nou (Mahón) has revealed very interesting radiocarbon dates that help situate the construction of the large western talayot chronologically. These dates, based on materials found in Building 1—attached to the large talayot—indicate that this structure was built between 1100 and 900 BCE. Therefore, the talayot must predate this building. This dating places the construction of the talayot during a period still dominated by the naviform tradition, although it would be prudent to wait for further excavations to determine whether this is an isolated case or part of a broader pattern across the region.

== The talayots of Menorca ==
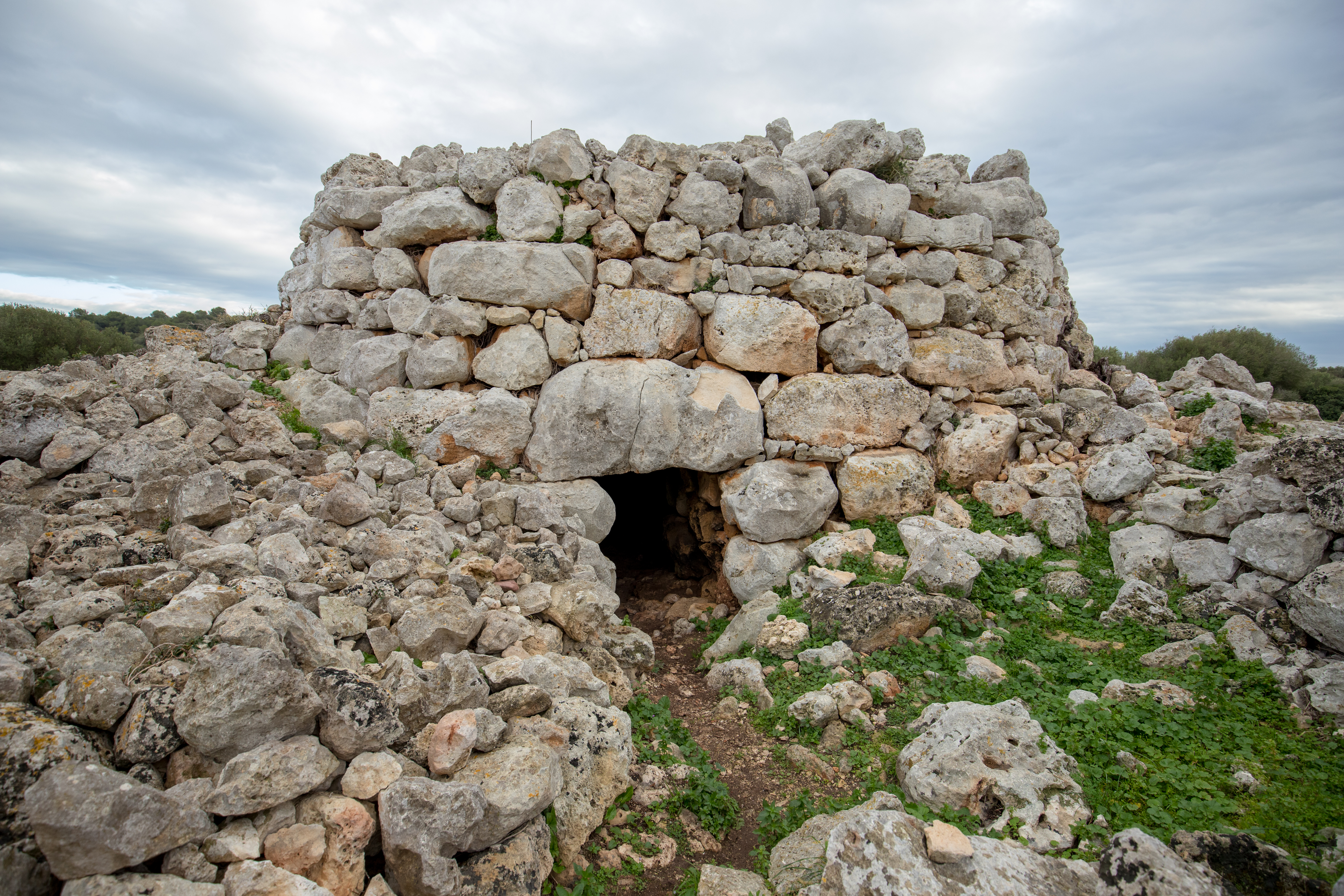
Talayot of Sant Agustí (San Cristòfol, Menorca)

The most numerous monument on the island of Menorca is the talayot, with over 300 examples. Despite these figures, few have been excavated, making it the least understood monument of Menorca’s prehistory. The few archaeological excavations of talayots carried out using modern methodology include those at Cornia Nou—which have provided very interesting data on the chronology and function of these buildings—Biniparratx Petit, Trebalúger, Torelló, and Binicalaf.

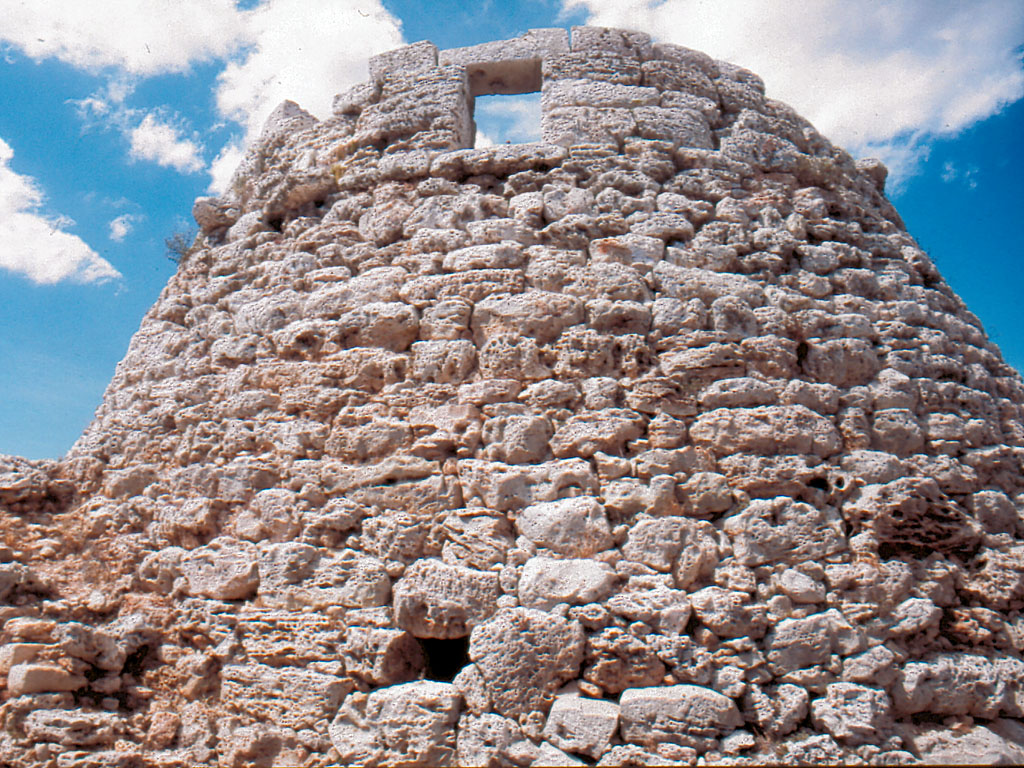
Talayot of Torellonet Vell (Menorca)

Generally, they appear to be truncated conical structures built from concentric rings of very large stones, with the spaces between filled in with smaller stones. However, despite these shared characteristics, the great typological diversity and the lack of extensive excavations make it impossible to clearly define the typology and function of the various structures referred to as talayots.

=== Typology of the Menorcan Talayots ===
- Talayots with circular corridor: Montefí
- Talayots with central passage: Eastern talayot of Cornia
- Talayots with monumental staircase: Western talayot of Cornia, Trepucó, northern talayot of Montefí
- Talayots with staircases connecting the ground to the upper floor: Cornia

== Talayotic Menorca – UNESCO World Heritage Site ==
Talayotic Menorca was inscribed on the UNESCO World Heritage List in 2023. It encompasses a collection of archaeological sites that bear witness to an exceptional island-based prehistoric culture, characterized by its unique cyclopean architecture. The island preserves exclusive monuments such as funerary navetas, circular houses, taula sanctuaries, and talayots, all of which exist in perfect harmony with Menorca’s landscape and its celestial connections.

Menorca has one of the richest archaeological landscapes in the world, shaped by generations that have safeguarded the Talayotic legacy. It has the highest density of prehistoric sites per surface area on any island, and is a symbol of its insular identity.

This cultural area is divided into nine zones that include archaeological sites and their associated landscapes, with a timeline spanning from the emergence of cyclopean constructions around 1600 BCE to the Romanization in 123 BCE. The outstanding value of its monuments and landscapes led to its inscription on the UNESCO World Heritage List in 2023.

== Sites ==
Talaiotic sites include:

- Capocorb Vell, 12 km south of Llucmajor, Mallorca: five talaiots and ancient village
- Ses Païsses, near Artà, Mallorca
- Son Oleza dolmen, Mallorca, discovered in 1999
- Bocchoris, Mallorca
- Settlement at S'illot, Mallorca
- Lloc Nou des Fasser, Menorca
- Son Rotger, Menorca
- Talatí de Dalt, Menorca
- Trebalúger, Menorca, dating from around 1500–100 BC: one of the oldest Talaiots on Menorca
- Trepucó, Menorca
- Torre d'en Galmés, Menorca

== Archaeology ==
In 2019 a well-preserved 3,200-year-old Bronze Age sword was discovered by archaeologists under the leadership of Jaume Deya and Pablo Galera at the Talaiot del Serral de ses Abelles in the Puigpunyent municipality of western Mallorca. The archaeologists believe that the weapon was made when the Talaiotic culture was in decline. The sword will be on display at the Mallorca Museum.

== See also ==
- Gymnesian Islands
- Ijang
