= Son Oleza =

Archaeological site in Valldemossa, Spain

Coordinates: 39.705142°N 2.5834798°E

The prehistoric site of Son Oleza is a prehistoric "Beaker culture" dolmen and associated settlement site on the Spanish island of Mallorca. It is near to the village of Valldemossa on the island's north-west facing coast. The site is named after the nearby place of Son Oleza.

The large site, a nearly complete village, has been investigated by Professor Bill Waldren. Significant features include houses, a dolmen and a water supply system. It is believed the site was occupied by several families between circa 2500BC to circa 1300BC.

In 1998 it was the subject of episode 5 in series five of the archaeological television programme Time Team (Series 5).

== Nearby sites ==
The "Talaiotic site of Son Ferrandell" is located in the immediate vicinity of the settlement of Son Oleza. It is not mentioned in the Time Team programme, but related to Son Oleza. Whether accidentally or intentionally, the four talayots on the site are laid out roughly South-West to North-East, perhaps similar to the alignment of Capocorb Vell.

Approximately 2 km North-East from Son Oleza are two further sites that feature in the Time Team programme: the maze and the sanctuary of Son Mas. The site referred to as "the maze" was likely occupied by a small group of Beaker people, and more extensively during the iron age, as well as the Roman period.

They might have used the copper and iron age sanctuary of Son Mas. The sanctuary has a sighting stone. During the copper age, up until about 1700BC, the sanctuary would have offered a view of the Southern Cross framed by a two mountains, and the Time Team speculate that this is of central importance to the site. The Southern Cross was not fully visible from 1700BC onward, and radiocarbon finds indicate that the site was unoccupied for about 400 years until 1300BC.
