= Tan Cottage =

Cottage in Plymouth, Devon, England

- Location within Devon Tan Cottage (England)

General information
- Location: 49 Fore Street, Plympton, England
- Coordinates: 50.3827°N 4.0482°W
- Completed: 17th century

Technical details
- Floor count: 2

Tan Cottage is a Grade II listed building in Plympton, Devon, England. It stands in Plympton's main street at 49 Fore Street, behind numbers 45 and 47, and dates mainly to the 17th century, when it was used as a tannery.

It has painted rubble walls, and a dry slate roof over two storeys. A large projection on its western elevation is believed to be the original lateral chimney stack.

The building was the focal property of Time Team during their visit in 1999.

In the interior, during renovations, a granite corbel was discovered, part of an older wall sitting behind the modern one. The lintel that it supported stretched into the adjacent property to the north, which continued up to Fore Street and the marketplace. During demolition of the property's shed, the top of a moulded granite window with at least two lights was discovered. The head of each window had a trefoil, and given that the top of the window was flat, not rounded, it was thought to be from a domestic building, of some standing, rather than ecclesiastical. Plymouth city archaeologist Keith Ray believed the stone came from the Hurdwick quarry at Tavistock Abbey, at nearby Roborough, which was active from the 12th century.
