= Torre d'en Galmés =

Archaeological site in Menorca, Spain

Coordinates: 39°54′09″N 4°06′55″E

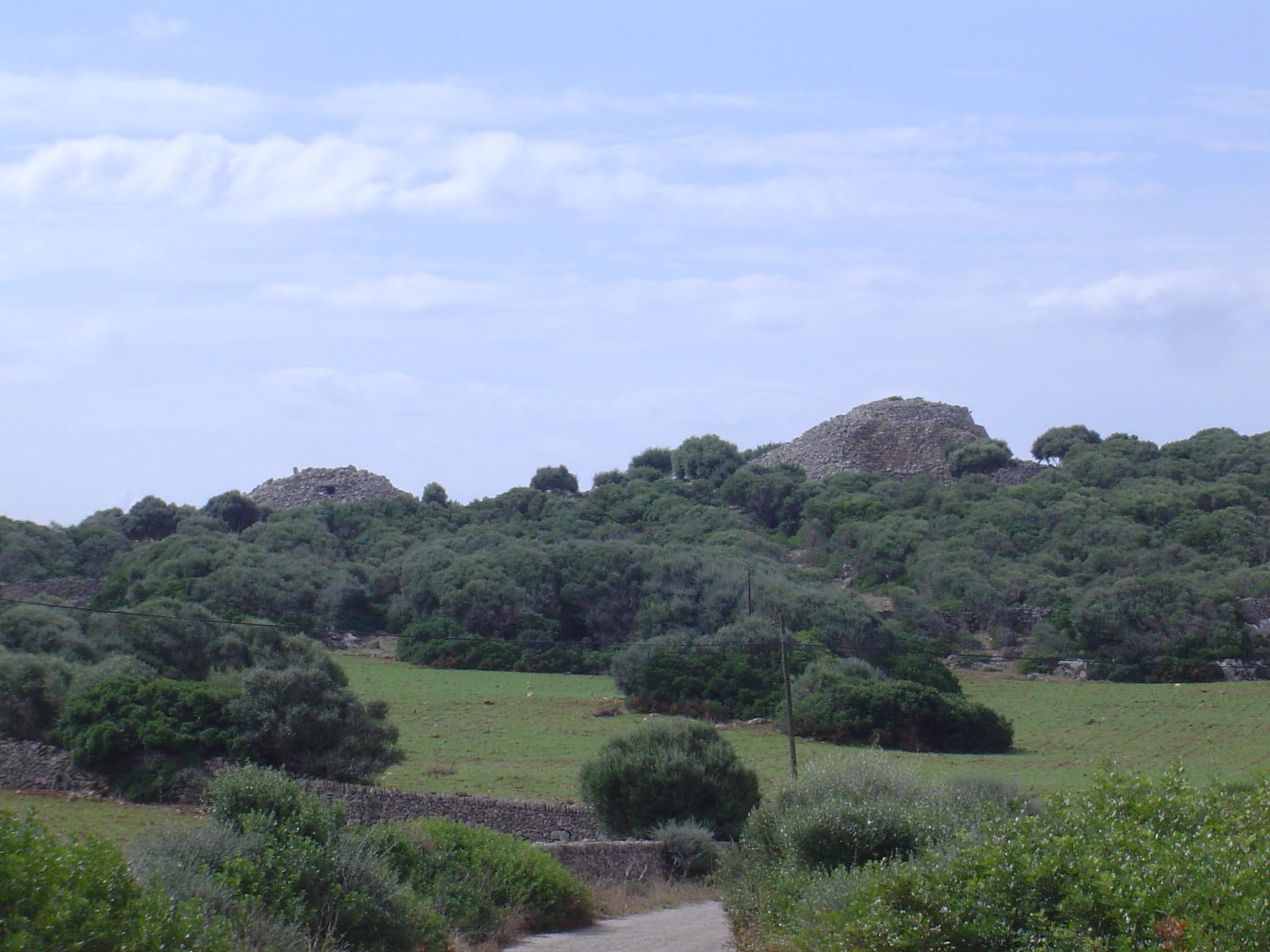
North view of Torre d'en Galmés.

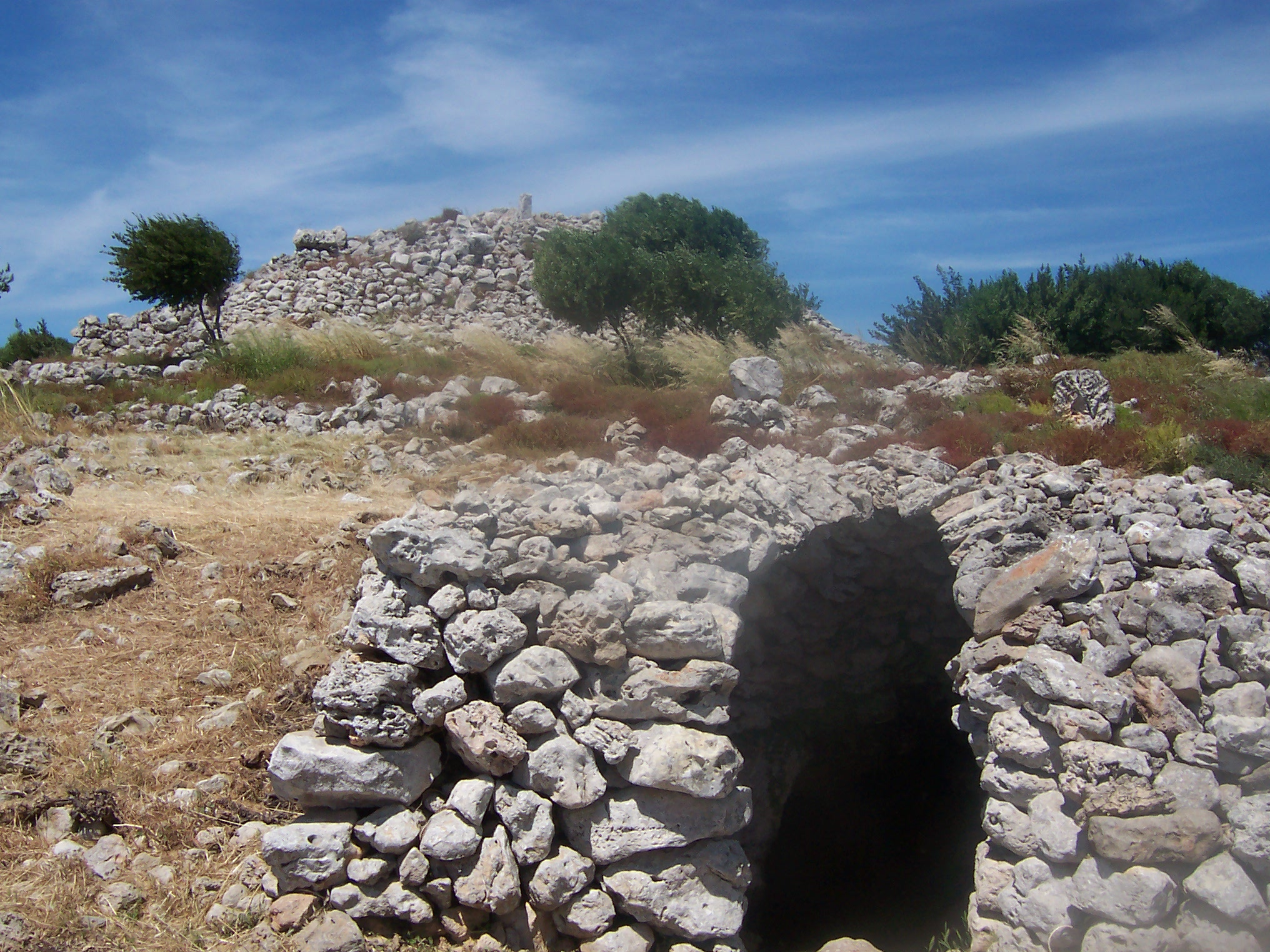
Torre d'en Galmés, talayot above.

Torre d'en Galmés is a Talayotic site on the island of Menorca, between Alaior and Son Bou, Menorca. The town developed from the start of the Talayotic era (1400 BC) and expanded until the end of the Roman occupation, after which it was abandoned. Buildings were reoccupied and adapted by Muslim refugees from the Reconquista (reconquest of Spain by Christian kingdoms) until the end of the Muslim occupation of the island.

== Situation ==
The town is situated on a small hill which is steeper on its south side. It has clear views over a large stretch of southern coast (and even to the mountains of Majorca). As the town grew it expanded southwards, and used a remarkably sophisticated water collection system to collect water coming down the hill in cisterns.

The town was one of the biggest in the Balearic Islands, and its high position overlooked other neighbouring towns.

== Talayots ==
There are three talayots at Torre d'en Galmés. The top of these stone towers provides the best views over the surrounding countryside, indicating their use as watchtowers. Between the middle and western one is an open space which may have been a public square.

In addition to the three talayots, there are remains of defensive walls and peripheral houses had fortified outer walls.

== Taula ==
There is a horseshoe shaped enclosure with a characteristic Menorcan taula, the T-shaped stone monument that presumably represents a religious site. The taula seems to have been intact until the end of Roman times, but the capital (top horizontal stone) is now separated and lies between the entrance door and the large vertical pillar stone. Two stages of construction are evident in the apse and sides, formed by large surprisingly smooth stones.

== Houses ==
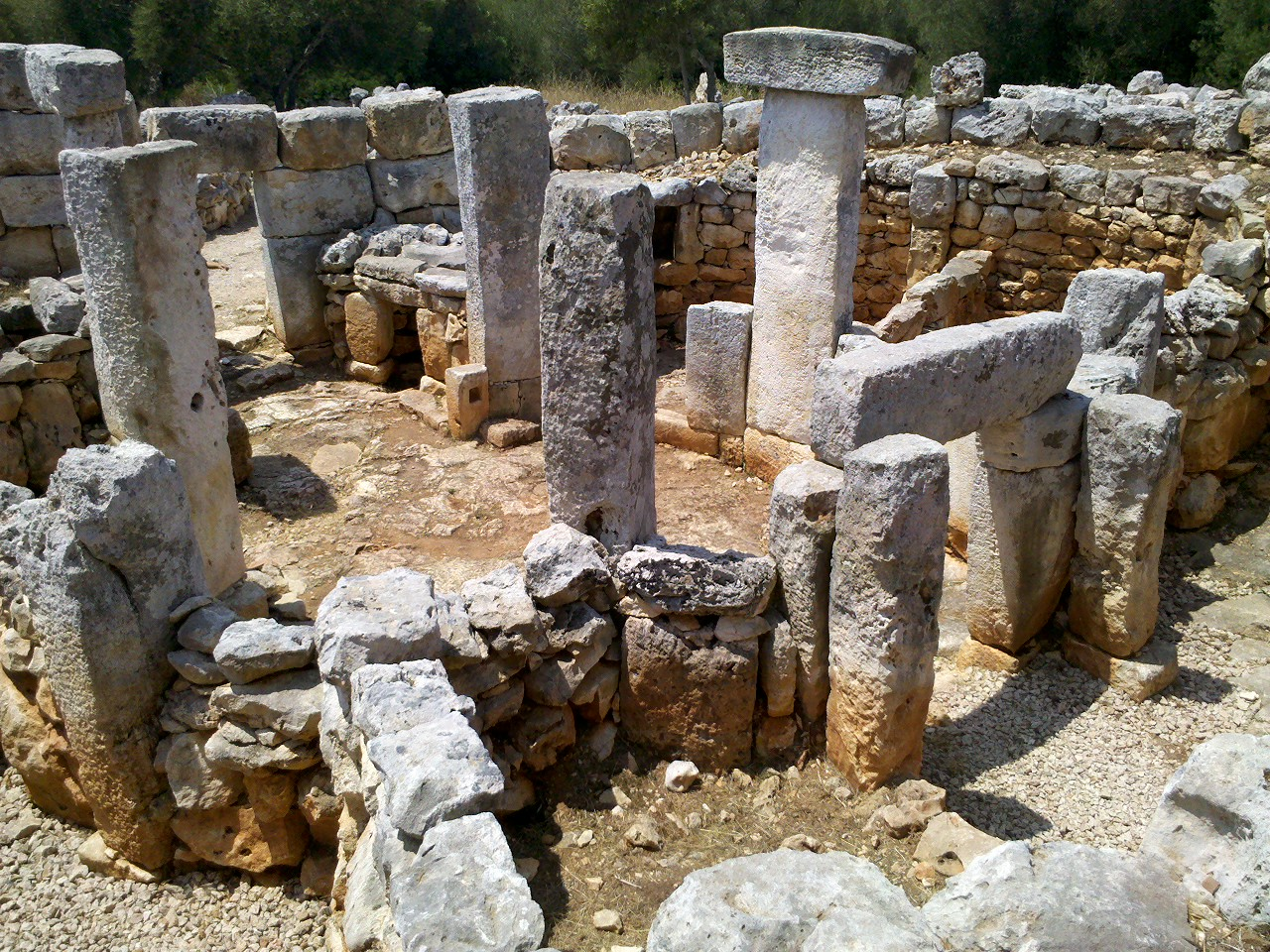
Inside of a talayotic house

The talayotic houses are constructed in the characteristic circular fashion. The outside wall is made of large stones, with radial walls making various rooms, and an open air central patio, where the fireplace and cistern were located. One of the excavated houses ("house 1") takes advantage of the rocky slope and includes a cave.

In the south of the town, one of the circular buildings features a well preserved Sala Hipostila ("room of columns"), adjacent to the side of the house and with large rocks still across the roof. The columns are of the Mediterranean type, wider at the top than the bottom. It is believed that this room was used as a storeroom and for livestock.

In the Roman period, some houses were modified, with more rectangular shaped interior rooms and smaller masonry stones. Further modifications were made during Muslim occupation.

== Water ==
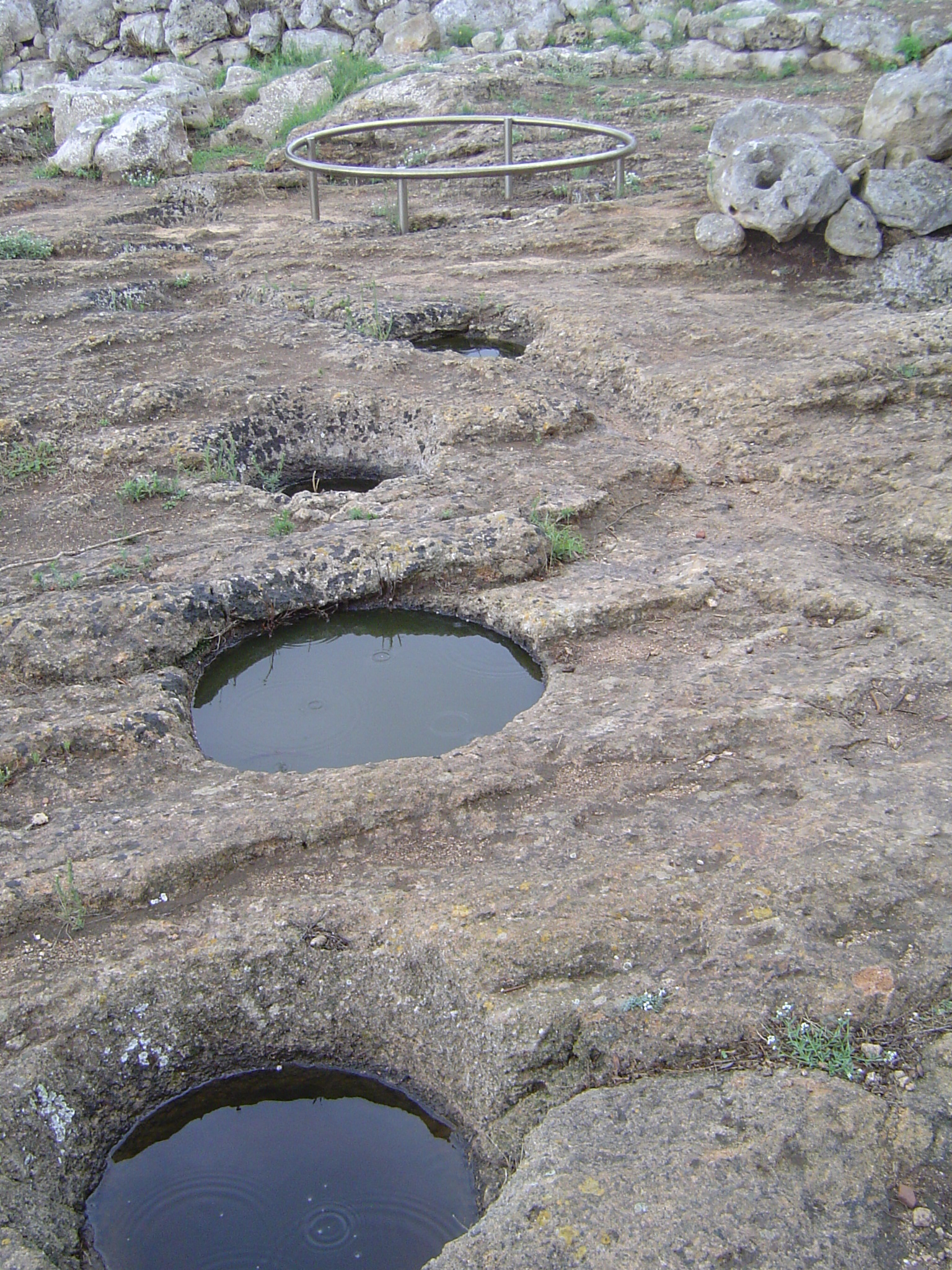
Rainwater conservation system

In the south of the town, there is a well preserved and remarkably sophisticated water conservation and storage system, using a sequence of underground cisterns connected by channels. At least one cave that had formerly been a pre-talayotic chamber tomb (pre-1400 BC) was used during the talayotic period to store water.

The talayotic people made a filter system of concave depressions, partly filled with pebbles, to clear soil from the water.

== Artefacts ==
Among the artefacts discovered at the site is a small bronze figurine of the deified Egyptian architect Imhotep, whose cult spread throughout the Mediterranean.
