= The Lodge, Plympton =

House in Plympton, Devon, England

The Lodge
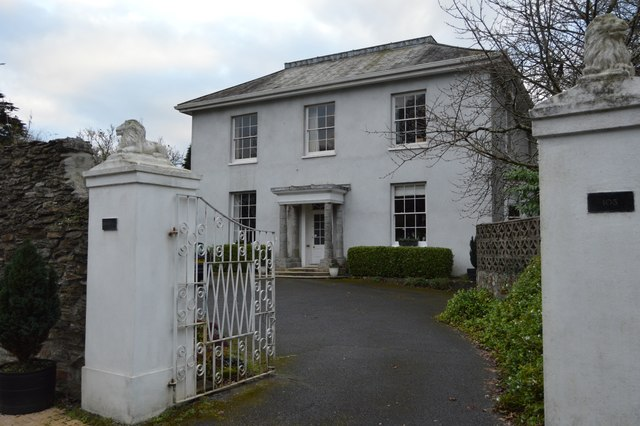
- The building in 2016

- Location within Devon The Lodge, Plympton (England)

General information
- Location: 103 Fore Street, Plympton, England
- Coordinates: 50.38309°N 4.0512°W
- Completed: 19th century

Technical details
- Floor count: 4

The Lodge is a Grade II listed building in Plympton, Devon, England. Standing at 103 Fore Street, the western end of Plympton's main street, it is a detached villa dating to the early- or mid-19th century.

A four-storey building (only two visible from the street), it has a dry-slate hipped roof with projecting eaves. It has a double-depth floor plan, believed to include two rooms at the front either side of a central entrance hall.

In 1999, the property's front garden was excavated by Time Team, after presenter Tony Robinson pointed out to Mick Aston, from their helicopter hovering above Fore Street, that the property was the only one set back from the road. Carenza Lewis received permission from the homeowner to dig an exploratory trench in her lawn, having seen a row of buildings on the same property on 18th-century maps.
