= Beric Morley =

British historian and archaeologist (1943–2015)

- Morley in 1989
- Born: Beric M. Morley; 19 September 1943; Shropshire, England
- Died: 28 January 2015 (aged 71)
- Occupations: Architectural historian, archaeologist
- Known for: Time Team

Beric M. Morley (19 September 1943 – 28 January 2015) was a British architectural historian and archaeologist. He became a familiar face on the Channel 4 television series Time Team. He was a regional director for English Heritage in the South West of England.

== Education ==
Morley attended Chislehurst and Sidcup Grammar School, before graduating from the University of Southampton with a Master's degree in theoretical physics and a Bachelor of Science in mathematics.

In 1996, at the age of 53, Morley took early retirement to complete a PhD about his first love, castles.

== Career ==
Morley initially went into teaching. He taught mathematics at Harrow County School for Boys from 1966 to 1969 before switching to archaeology, eventually spending thirty years in the profession. His first role in archaeology was as Assistant Inspector of Ancient Monuments in the Ministry of Public Building and Works. He worked in the West Country and the West Midlands before becoming Regional Director for the South West, based in Bristol.

Morley declined an offer to be nominated for a fellowship of the Society of Antiquaries of London early in his career. He felt he had not yet done enough to deserve the honour.

== Time Team ==
Morley appeared in ten episodes of Time Team between 1995 and 2002.

== Alzheimer's disease ==
Morley was diagnosed with Alzheimer's disease in 2004. Three years earlier he had walked out of a shop and suddenly realised he could not remember where he was. With his diagnosis, his academic research ended.

=== Death ===
Morley died on 28 January 2015, at the age of 71.

== Personal life ==
Morley was married to Judith, a graduate of Durham University, with whom he lived in Leighton Buzzard, Bedfordshire. They had three sons.

=== Books ===
Morley had several books published during his career, including:

- Henry VIII and the Development of Coastal Defence (1976)
- Blackfriars, Gloucester (1979)
- Peveril Castle (1993)
- The Castles of Pendennis and St Mawes (1995)
- Castle Rising Castle, Norfolk (1997)
