= Time Team series 11 =

Time Team
- Season 11
- No. of episodes: 13

Release
- Original network: Channel 4
- Original release: 4 January – 28 March 2004

Series chronology
- ← Previous; Series 10 Next → Series 12

This is a list of Time Team episodes from series 11.

== Episode ==
=== Series 11 ===
Episode # refers to the air date order. The Time Team Specials are aired in between regular episodes, but are omitted from this list. Regular contributors on Time Team include Tony Robinson (presenter); archaeologists Mick Aston, Phil Harding, Carenza Lewis, Helen Geake, Brigid Gallagher, Neil Holbrook, Faye Simpson, Matt Williams, Ian Powlesland, Kerry Ely; Guy de la Bedoyere (historian); Jackie McKinley (bone specialist); Victor Ambrus (illustrator), Stewart Ainsworth (landscape investigator), John Gater (geophysicist); Henry Chapman (surveyor); Paul Blinkhorn, Mark Corney (pottery).

No. overall	No. in season	Title	Location	Historical period	Coordinates	Original release date
108	1	"In Search of the Brigittine Abbey"	Syon House, London	Tudor	51.476340°N 0.311899°W	4 January 2004
The team are on the trail of a medieval mystery. Founded by Henry V and built by his son Henry VI, Syon Abbey was a large, wealthy monastery for nuns of an obscure Swedish order. During the reign of Henry VIII it vanished. Its remains lie beneath the lawns of modern Syon House, designed by Capability Brown. What they find is on a huge scale. But there is disagreement as to what kind of building it was. After investigating the foundations of the House, Stewart and Jonathan reach an agreement on the extent of the church. They are joined by buildings historian Jonathan Foyle and monastic expert Barney Sloane.
109	2	"A Roman Bath House and Edwardian Folly"	Whitestaunton Manor, Somerset	Roman	50.8897032°N 3.0248144°W	11 January 2004
Next to the beautifully manicured lawns of Whitestaunton Manor in the Blackdown Hills of Somerset lies a patch of muddy weeds. Coins and pottery have been found here, and it is supposedly the site of a Roman villa. But archaeology student Freya Bowles thinks differently. The team first have to remove weeds and tree roots without the use of mechanical diggers, as it's a scheduled monument. They are also extremely limited as to the size of the excavation. Clearly there are Roman remains, but mixed up with Victorian or Edwardian garden features. Gradually the plan of a Roman bath house emerges. The team are joined by mosaic specialist David Neal and buildings historian Jonathan Foyle. Directed by technological historian Robert Spain, they build a full-size replica hypocaust complete with under-floor heating.
110	3	"The Crannog in the Loch"	Loch Migdale, Scottish Highlands	Iron Age	57.892503°N 4.319505°W	18 January 2004
There's an island-ish round area of stones in Loch Migdale - could it be a crannog? 200 meters away on the banks is a small (12 m diameter) circular feature - is it a henge? Time Team rounds up some experts on the prehistoric and finds out. They set up a suction dredge to investigate two areas of the loch feature, and find wonderfully preserved timber, proving that it's a built structure and thus a crannog. GPS surveying and a tip from a local farmer finds the causeway, now underwater, leading to it Trenches within the henge show that the entrance and wooden posts within it pointed towards notable features in the landscape. Stewart looks for the find site of the Migdale Hoard.
111	4	"Saxon Burials on the Ridge"	South Carlton, Lincolnshire	Anglo-Saxon, Bronze Age	53.281810°N 0.566168°W	25 January 2004
The team investigate a possible fifth century cemetery in a ploughed field, where they find a metal shield boss. One male skeleton is holding a drinking vessel. There are hints of much earlier activity as well, including a Bronze Age barrow. Using authentic tools, they fashion a Saxon shield. Conservator Dana Goodburn-Brown examines the details in the x-rays of the shield boss; while Phil and members of Regia Anglorum demonstrate how the shields are used in battle. They are joined by bone specialists Alice Roberts and Margaret Cox, who unearth some coloured beads among the remains.
112	5	"The Roman Fort That Wasn't There"	Syndale, Kent	Roman	51.313727°N 0.860548°E	1 February 2004
Nobody knows what happened immediately after the Romans arrived in 43 AD, because no Roman fort has been discovered in this part of South East England. Time Team are on a mission to find the missing link. Local archaeologist Paul Wilkinson believes he has already found a military ditch, which would surround such a fort. It's a prime site, right next to Watling Street. However geophysics cannot find any evidence for a ditch. So begins one of their most frustrating digs, directed by Neil Holbrook. Phil enlists in the Ermine Street Guard for a day. They are joined by Roman expert Tony Wilmott and pottery specialist Malcolm Lyne.
113	6	"An Iron-Age Trading Centre"	Green Island, Dorset	Iron Age	50.67893°N 1.990799°W	8 February 2004
Green Island in Poole Harbour has already shown that it was a significant centre of Iron Age activity, with evidence of industrial activity and trading to and from the continental mainland. But it has never been properly excavated. Two huge jetties - now buried - indicate either a port or a defensive structure. The island is a SSSI (Site of Special Scientific Interest), which means hand-digging only, and replacing the topsoil. Very soon the finds start to multiply. Of particular interest is evidence of shale working for jewelry, and iron smithing. They are joined by Project Director Eileen Wilkes, archaeologist Miles Russell, Iron Age specialist John Collis, and metallurgist Roger Doonan. Experimental archaeologist Jake Keenan demonstrates shale working with primitive tools. Geomorphologist Vincent May explains that in prehistoric times the water level was two metres lower, and Green Island was much bigger.
114	7	"A Medieval Blast Furnace"	The Old Furnace, Oakamoor, Staffordshire	Medieval	52.98913°N 1.939713°W	15 February 2004
The team are revisiting the garden of Furnace Cottage in Churnet Valley, where the previous excavation of an Elizabethan blast furnace produced evidence of much earlier iron-making. Stewart surveys the landscape, to piece together a picture of water flow and other features essential to iron smelting. But John is convinced that there is strong geophysical evidence for a furnace a mile away at Eastwall Farm. It could even be water-powered - a major discovery. They build a medieval style bloomery. They are joined by historian Pete Brown, and archaeologists David Cranstone, Bill Klemperer, Deb Ford, Gerry McDonnell, Tim Young.
115	8	"Rescuing a Mesolithic Foreshore"	Goldcliff, Newport	Mesolithic	51.532536°N 2.903950°W	22 February 2004
When the tide recedes at this point on the Severn estuary, rare evidence of stone age activity is uncovered. Time Team are on a three-day mission to help recover some of these relics before they are washed away. It involves excavating and painstakingly examining 15 cubic metres of muddy silt; but time is against them. The Mesolithic period is poorly understood, because these people were highly mobile hunter-gatherers who did not build permanent structures. They uncover some of the smallest artefacts they have ever handled. Phil and Brigid are fascinated by ancient footprints of adults and children, preserved in the sand. Phil excavates the massive tooth of an aurochs, an extinct giant prey animal. They are joined by Martin Bell of Reading University, Mesolithic specialists Nick Barton and Robin Crompton, and food expert Jacqui Wilson who cooks up a stone age feast.
116	9	"Fertile Soils, Rich Archaeology"	Wittenham Clumps, Oxfordshire	Iron Age	51.627914°N 1.180515°W	29 February 2004
The British landscape is littered with Iron Age hill forts. A local archaeology unit is digging such a hill fort in Oxfordshire, but cannot afford to investigate a neighbouring larger hill, only 200 metres away. Both Roman and Iron Age remains have been found there in the past. But what is its relationship, if any, to the hill fort? The geophysics team identify a potential target, a square enclosure on the side of the hill. But before they can begin, they have to manually search the site for specimens of great crested newt, a rare protected species. At the beginning of day two, John's team find something which could be very special, a Roman church, apparently with a semicircular apse. They are joined by Tim Allen of Oxford Archaeology and osteoarchaeologist Angela Boyle.
117	10	"King Cnut's Manor"	Nassington, Northamptonshire	Early Medieval	52.552655°N 0.433747°W	7 March 2004
Digging up fields and car parks and back gardens is all very well, but how could Time Team pass up a chance to dig up a living room? The manor house in Nassington was purchased in a derelict state, and while restoring it, several massive post holes were investigated that are of a size and spacing to be a Saxon great hall. The pottery finds from the property suggest almost constant occupation from the Iron Age to the present, and the Ramsey Chronicle records that Cnut owned Nassington while king. Up comes the flooring so three trenches can be dug inside the house, while outside, various trenches are dug in the garden. It seems that hall after hall was built where the manor house still stands, but no trace can any longer be found of outbuildings which must have been there. Graeme Lawson visits with a selection of Dark Ages musical instruments, makes a reed pipe of elder wood, and plays out the episode with the Time Team theme music on pipe and lyre.
118	11	"Back-Garden Archaeology Revisiting a Roman villa"	Ipswich, Suffolk	Roman	52.076522°N 1.132127°E	14 March 2004
As renowned Suffolk archaeologist Basil Brown discovered, Castle Hill near Ipswich is named, not after a castle, but a substantial Roman villa. Brown was unable to complete his excavation, and Time Team have been called in by local schoolchildren to find out more. However, they will need to dig up a few back gardens to do so. Very soon it becomes clear that Brown's measurements were out of kilter. Halfway through day two, Phil makes a breakthrough. But not until 11 trenches are dug in 8 gardens does a full picture emerge. The team are joined by Roman specialist David Neale and site director Miles Russell.
119	12	"The Lost City of Roxburgh"	Roxburgh, Scottish Borders	Medieval	55.597499°N 2.448431°W	21 March 2004
121	13	"Brimming with Remains"	Cranborne Chase, Dorset	Roman	50.928594°N 2.039061°W	28 March 2004
Pigs rooting in a windswept field in Dorset unearthed fragments including Roman mosaic floor tiles. In addition, a Bournemouth University excavation team located some burials nearby. The farmer, Simon Meaden, has asked Time Team to investigate further. John's geophysics survey reveals a lot of activity. Very soon multiple finds start appearing, and to Tony's delight he is allowed to dig up a little beaker. Archaeologist Mike Parker Pearson produces a timeline of prehistoric and historic burial practices. Phil's trench is invaded by chickens. Gradually a complex picture emerges of human activity here over thousands of years, including a heated Roman villa with bath-house.

== See also ==
- Time Team Digs
- Time Team Extra
- Time Team Specials
- Time Team Others
