= All Saints' Church, Low Worsall =

Church in Low Worsall, North Yorkshire, England

Coordinates: 54°28′57″N 1°23′24″W

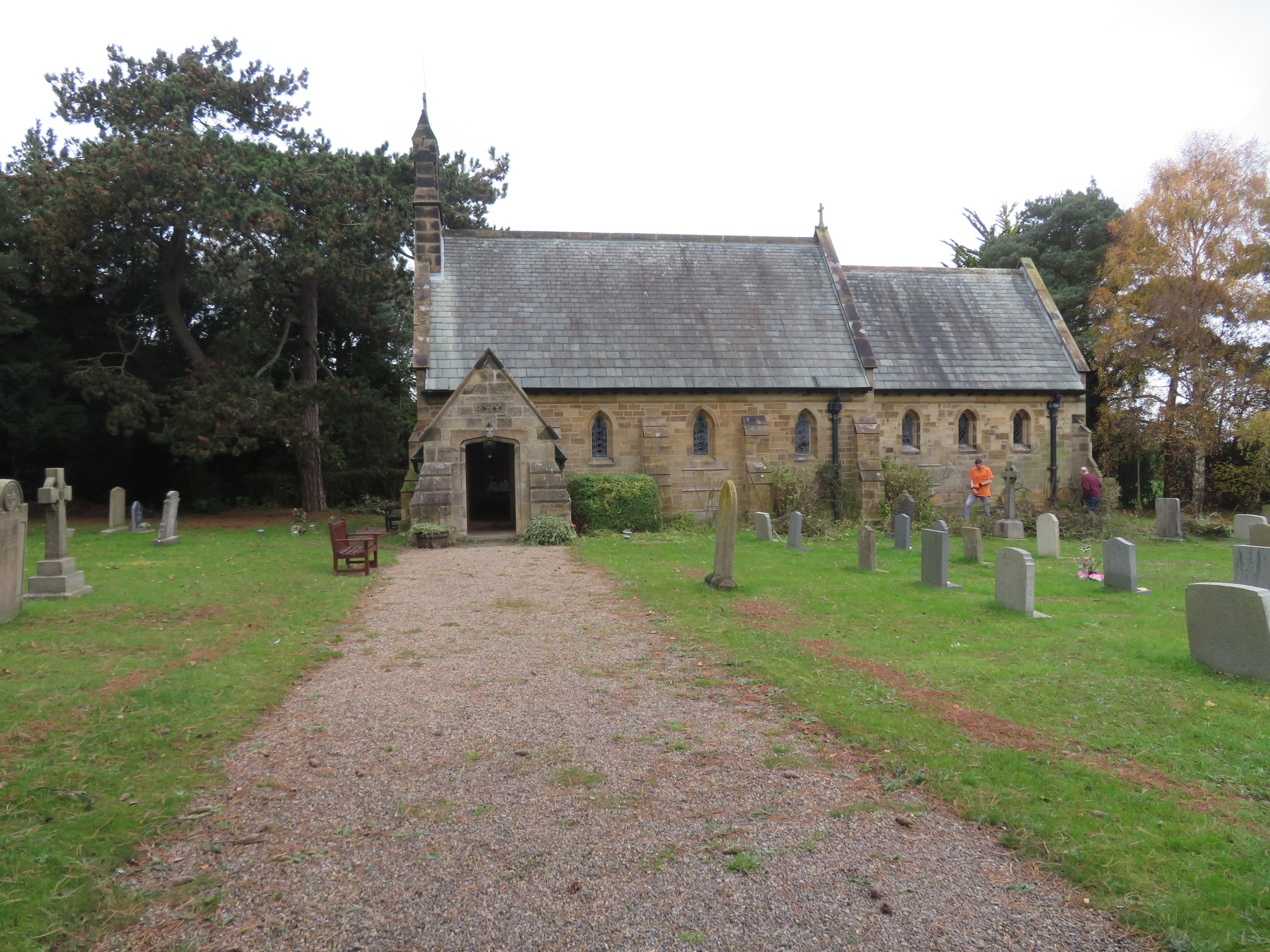
The church, in 2023

All Saints' Church is the parish church of Low Worsall, a village in North Yorkshire, in England.

In the Medieval period, Low Worsall was served by a church in neighbouring High Worsall. It was entirely rebuilt in 1710, and in 1894 it was replaced by the current church, in Low Worsall. The new building was designed by Armfield and William Moscrop, in the Early English style. It was grade II listed in 1966.

The church is built of stone with a Lakeland slate roof, and is in Early English style. It consists of a nave, a south porch, and a chancel with north vestry. On the west gable is a bellcote.

== See also ==
- Listed buildings in Low Worsall
