= Time Team series 12 =

Time Team
- Season 12
- No. of episodes: 13

Release
- Original network: Channel 4
- Original release: 2 January – 3 April 2005

Series chronology
- ← Previous; Series 11 Next → Series 13

This is a list of Time Team episodes from series 12.

== Episode ==
=== Series 12 ===
Episode # refers to the air date order. The Time Team Specials are aired in between regular episodes, but are omitted from this list. Regular contributors on Time Team include: Tony Robinson (presenter); archaeologists Mick Aston, Phil Harding, Carenza Lewis, Helen Geake, Mark Corney, Brigid Gallagher, Matt Williams, Mick Worthington, Ian Powlesland; historians Guy de la Bedoyere, Francis Pryor; Victor Ambrus (illustrator); Stewart Ainsworth (landscape investigator); John Gater (geophysicist); Henry Chapman (surveyor); Paul Blinkhorn (pottery expert).

| No. overall | No. in season | Title | Location | Coordinates | Original release date |
|---|---|---|---|---|---|
| 125 | 1 | "The Manor That's Back to Front" | Chenies Manor House, Buckinghamshire | 51.674775°N 0.533114°W | 2 January 2005 |
Tony Robinson and the team visit Chenies Manor which is believed to have been upgraded in time for Henry VIII's visit around 1530. However, while a late 16th-century inventory suggests that an additional range of rooms fit for a king once existed, traces of them have vanished since the house fell into disrepair. Can the experts uncover the layout of the building as it appeared in Tudor times?
| 126 | 2 | "The Monastery and the Mansion" | Nether Poppleton, North Yorkshire | 53.988279°N 1.148894°W | 9 January 2005 |
The villagers of Nether Poppleton, near York, join Tony Robinson and the team for some extensive digging as they try to determine the exact age of their village. The current layout follows a typical medieval pattern but a reference to the village in the Domesday Book has the experts thinking that it could date back to Saxon times at least.
| 127 | 3 | "The Bombers in the Marsh" | Warton, Lancashire | 53.735285°N 2.935246°W | 16 January 2005 |
On 29 November 1944, two US Douglas A-26 Invader bomber planes crashed into Warton Marsh, eight miles from Preston, in Lancashire. Both planes, along with a number of others, had left Warton Airbase in formation, en route to join forces in the preparations for the Battle of the Bulge. Only one minute off the runway and 1,000 feet into the air, the aircraft collided and came to rest in the marsh. All the crew died. Their bodies were recovered from the planes, but an investigation into the causes of the crash was inconclusive. When the planes crashed back in 1944, they landed directly on sand. Since then, however, about two metres of silt has built up over the wrecks. It means that the site is a difficult one to excavate, and an earlier attempt to retrieve the aircraft in the 1980s was unsuccessful. For this programme, Time Team enlisted a veteran air crash investigator, along with the RAF's 'crash and smash' team and other experts to try to find out what caused the crash. Each of the planes, including the engines, was believed to be relatively intact and, it was hoped, would provide the necessary information to determine why these two planes collided. Local eyewitnesses and fellow flyers in the US Air Force were all called upon to help to build up a picture of what happened on that fateful day in 1944.
| 128 | 4 | "Fighting on the Frontier" | Drumlanrig, Dumfries and Galloway | 55.271321°N 3.807620°W | 23 January 2005 |
Twenty years ago, during a particularly dry summer, parch marks revealed what seemed to be a huge Roman fort a few hundred metres from the Duke of Buccleuch's extraordinarily grand house, Drumlanrig Castle, in Dumfries. The discovery lay untouched until Time Team took on the challenge to investigate it further. The Team sought to answer a number of questions. Was it actually a Roman fort? If so, it was one of the most northerly ever found and therefore of special importance to Scotland's history. So when were the Romans there? No finds made previously had given any hint of the date of the structure. Time Team also wanted to identify the roads leading in and out of the fort. Was there any kind of civilian settlement or other features nearby? And could the Team work out how the Romans made their famous draco, the military standard that made a sound said to have struck fear into the hearts of their enemies?
| 129 | 5 | "A Neolithic Cathedral?" | Northborough, Cambridgeshire | 52.662008°N 0.291830°W | 30 January 2005 |
The Time Team is invited to a huge circular crop mark near Peterborough, referred to as a causewayed enclosure by archaeologists. Huge ditches mark the area, which date the site at around 6,000 years old. Some believe the ditches to be evidence of farming, others that they are of religious origin. Francis Pryor and Ben Robinson join the team to get to the bottom of the mystery in just three days.
| 130 | 6 | "In Search of Henry V's Flagship, Grace Dieu" | Bursledon, Hampshire | 50.891844°N 1.288816°W | 6 February 2005 |
The team have three days to explore the skeleton of a medieval warship found on the bed of the River Hamble near Southampton. They must prove whether it is the Grace Dieu, Henry V's naval flagship, and also find out how big it was and just why it came to grief. The team are joined by John Adams (marine archeologist) and Susan Rose (historian). Damian Goodburn (ancient ship expert) attempts to reproduce a small section of the massive ship's clinker built hull.
| 131 | 7 | "Going Upmarket with the Romans" | Standish, Gloucestershire | 51.778168°N 2.290930°W | 13 February 2005 |
For years, a field near Standish in Gloucestershire has yielded Roman brooches, mosaic tiles and coins. The finds point to a sizeable villa somewhere nearby - but so far none has been found. Tony Robinson and the team have just three days to solve the mystery. There are plenty of signs that people lived in the area from the Iron Age through to the Roman period, but no sign of the villa. But clue by clue the archaeologists piece together the puzzle to reveal an extraordinary picture of several generations of one family living through huge social change and gradually improving their lifestyle as Romanised Britain became more and more prosperous.
| 132 | 8 | "Picts and Hermits: Cave Dwellers of Fife" | Wemyss, Fife | 56.162351°N 3.057839°W | 20 February 2005 |
Wemyss Caves, on the shore of the Firth of Forth, have been a famous landmark for centuries. Legend has it that they were occupied by the mysterious Pictish people who scared the Romans into building Hadrian's Wall; that subsequently they were home to medieval Christian hermits and later to Jacobean nobles. Now the caves are under serious threat from erosion; the sea is already lapping at the cliff just below the cave line. But Wemyss Caves have never been properly investigated. How did the enigmatic Pictish carvings on the cave wall get there? And did Picts really live in the caves or were they just passing by? Is there any evidence of hermits or other types of medieval occupation? In an intensive three days, Time Team come up with some remarkable answers, beginning the task of re-writing the history of this atmospheric site.
| 133 | 9 | "Lost Centuries of St Osyth" | St Osyth, Essex | 51.798826°N 1.063060°E | 27 February 2005 |
In the 7th century Viking pirates sailed up a muddy Essex creek. Legend has it they captured a lonely nun who when offered her 'modesty or her mortality', chose to die. The nun then carried her severed head up the hill to her church where she collapsed. Where she lay a spring bubbled up. The nun was St Osyth, the wife of the Saxon King of Essex, who chose the veil rather than consummating her marriage. The site of her death became a shrine and a busy settlement grew up. In the 12th century Richard de Belmais, Bishop of London, founded a large Augustinian Priory in the middle of the village. This became a powerful establishment, which by the Dissolution in 1539 was one of the wealthiest Augustinian Monasteries in Europe. A few years ago a local boatbuilder noticed some decayed timbers sticking out of the mud in St Osyth Creek. The tides gradually revealed more of these timbers, which are on a significant bend in the channel. These timbers could be the remains of a medieval wharf which served the town in its early days, but they could also be the key to a much bigger mystery. The present town seems to date to the 15th century but the famous Priory is much older. There must have been a busy settlement servicing it - so where was the original town of St Osyth? Time Team have three days to redraw the map of this picturesque town on the Essex coast.
| 134 | 10 | "The Puzzle of Picket's Farm" | South Perrott, Dorset | 50.844866°N 2.752691°W | 6 March 2005 |
Time Team heads to South Perrott in Dorset, inspired by the intriguing discovery of Roman brooches and coins in a hilltop field. The Team are pretty sure they're going to uncover a Roman Temple, but the search gets off to a bad start when all the pottery turns out to be medieval and there's no sign of any buildings. Something has clearly been going on in this field, but it's not what they thought. The trenches gradually reveal their contents, painting a very different picture from a very different period. Have the Team stumbled across a Stone Age burial site that had, extraordinarily, been honoured for thousands of years right into Roman times? Prehistory specialist Miles Russell explains some aspects of Bronze Age features.
| 135 | 11 | "Norman Neighbours" | Skipsea, East Riding of Yorkshire | 53.967614°N 0.213551°W | 13 March 2005 |
For years Time Team fan Frances Davies has been collecting finds from the field outside her back door in Skipsea in East Yorkshire. She has uncovered Neolithic, Roman and Saxon items, but her best finds are medieval pots dating from the Norman Conquest. It's clear that there was some habitation in the area 1,000 years ago, but a geophysics plot of the site reveals incredible results, far beyond the team's expectations. Could Frances have had a whole Norman village in her field, a village lost to the records? And could there be a clue in nearby Skipsea Castle, the seat of power of the Norman overlord of the whole area? The Team have three days to find out.
| 136 | 12 | "Hunting the Romans in South Shields - Tower Blocks and Togas" | South Shields, Tyne and Wear | 55.000462°N 1.432911°W | 20 March 2005 |
In South Shields, the Roman Fort at the end of Hadrian's Wall is a local landmark and the team embark on a quest to locate the site of a huge Roman military cemetery thought to be in the area. They search all nearby open spaces but come to the conclusion that the likeliest site of the cemetery is beneath a 1960s housing estate. A few tombstones and burials have been found in the past hundred years, but there must be a huge Roman military cemetery somewhere. Time Team use every spare piece of open space, have a look under the occasional pavement and enlist as much local help, young and old, as possible in their hunt for the site. It's three days of head-scratching mayhem before the answer emerges.
| 137 | 13 | "Animal Farm" | Hanslope, Buckinghamshire | 52.126082°N 0.873735°W | 3 April 2005 |
An unusual horse bit, some posh finds and carved stonework lead Time Team on a search for a Norman hunting lodge in Northamptonshire. But it isn't long before the lodge's massive stone walls begin to look a little less impressive, and, under the forensic trowels of the diggers, the lodge shrinks in every direction. But royal forests were fiercely protected by the Norman nobility; why are there buildings here at all? Does the Domesday Book hold a clue? It seems as if this area was home to an extraordinary number of pigs... Have the Team come across one of the very first factory farms?

== See also ==
- Time Team Live
- Time Team History Hunters
- Time Team Digs
- Time Team Extra
- Time Team America
- Time Team Specials
- Time Team Others
