= George Thomas Rudd =

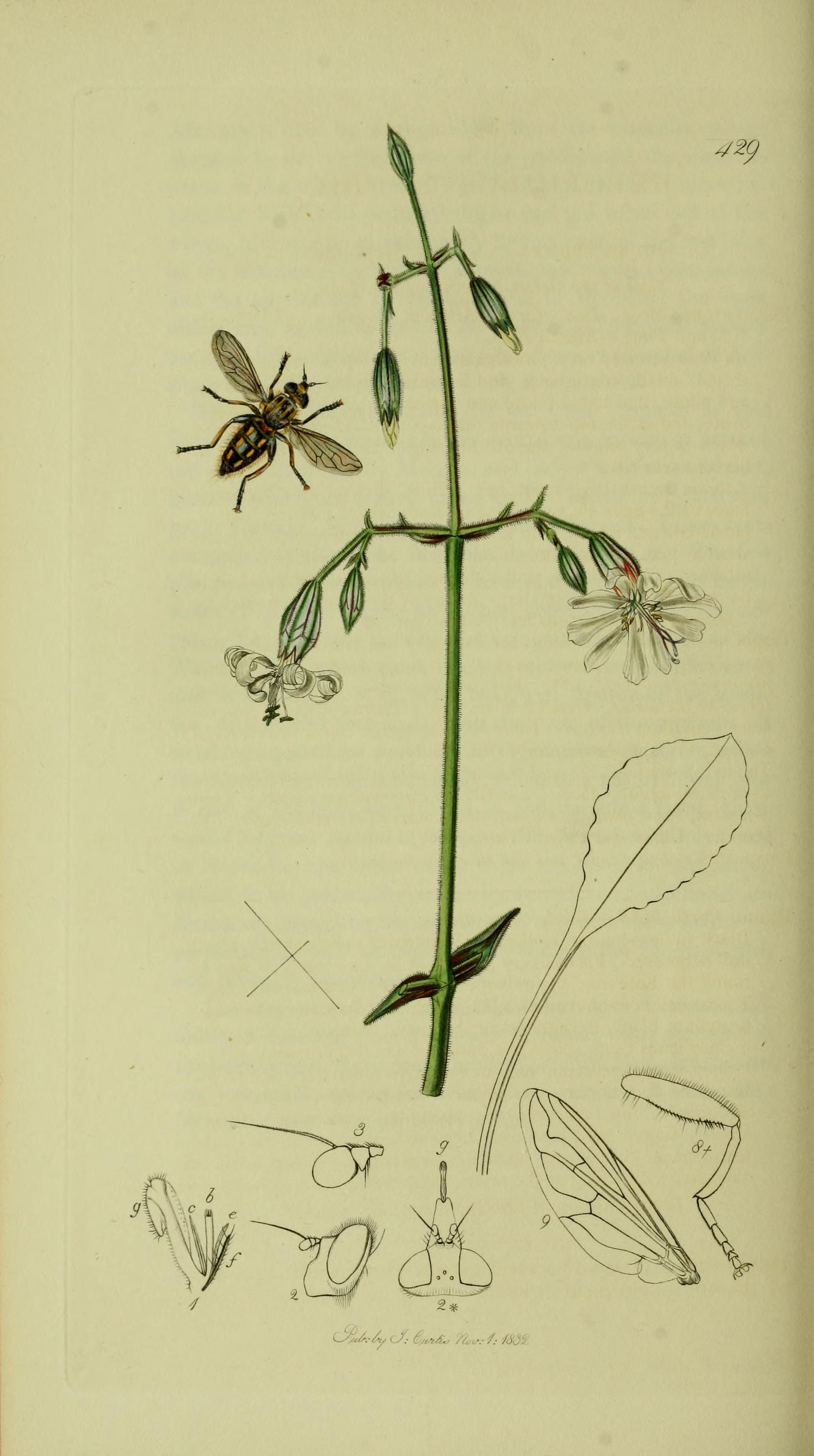
Helophilus ruddii a hoverfly named to honour Rudd in British Entomology

George Thomas Rudd (c.1795 - 4 March 1847) was an English priest and entomologist mainly interested in Coleoptera.

Rudd was probably born in North Yorkshire 1794 or 1795. He studied at St John's College, Cambridge, where he got a B.A. before 1818 and a M.A. before 1821. He was ordained as deacon in 1818 and as priest in 1819 by John Fisher. He served as curate at Horsted Keynes (West Sussex) from 1818, at Shipton Bellinger (Hampshire) from 1819, and at Kimpton (Hampshire) from 1821. In 1833 he was appointed vicar of Sockburn (North Yorkshire), where he lived for a number of years at Worsall Hall near Yarm.

He was a typical parson-naturalist, who developed a great interest in insects.

His captures of beetles are mentioned by James Francis Stephens, John Curtis and Alexander Henry Haliday and he collected insects with George Samouelle. Rudd published six notes on insects in the Entomologist’s Magazine and other journals between 1834 and 1846 some of which dealt with beetles. The last described Haltica dispar as a new species. (Zoologist, 4, 1846, p. 1517). He was a fellow of the Linnean Society and in 1833, he was a founder of the Entomological Society of London, later Royal Entomological Society. He died on 4 March 1847 in London at the age of 52.

The G. T. Rudd Collection is in Yorkshire Museum, York.
