= Low Worsall =

Village and civil parish in North Yorkshire, England

Coordinates: 54°28′58″N 1°23′44″W

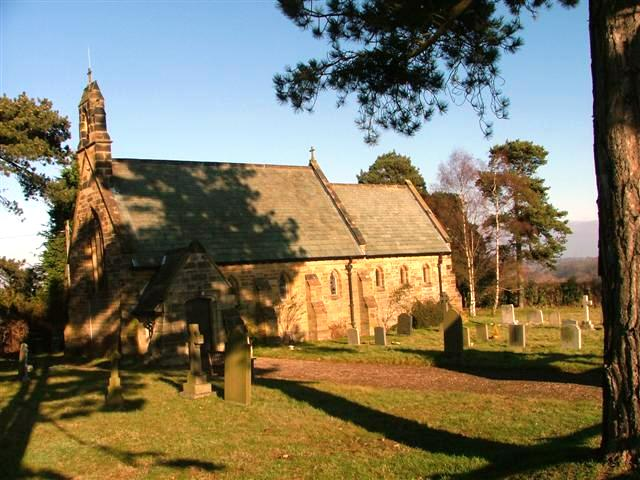
- All Saints' Church

- Location within North Yorkshire
- Population: 279 (including High Worsall. 2011 census)
- OS grid reference: NZ392099
- Civil parish: Low Worsall
- Unitary authority: North Yorkshire
- Ceremonial county: North Yorkshire
- Region: Yorkshire and the Humber
- Country: England
- Sovereign state: United Kingdom
- Post town: YARM
- Postcode district: TS15
- Police: North Yorkshire
- Fire: North Yorkshire
- Ambulance: Yorkshire

Low Worsall is a small village and civil parish in the county of North Yorkshire, England, near High Worsall and 3 miles (4.8 km) west of Yarm.

From 1974 to 2023 it was part of the Hambleton District, it is now administered by the unitary North Yorkshire Council.

The name Worsall derives from the Old English Weorcshalh meaning 'Weorc's nook of land'.

In 1732, Richard and Thomas Peirse developed a port on the southern banks of the River Tees at Low Worsall, and named it Peirseburgh. The river was naviagable as far as Worsall at that time, and exports of lead would pass through Worsall to be loaded onto ships at Yarm. The brothers developed a port to capture road traffic and transfer it to and from ships. The brothers lived at Worsall Hall, which is now a grade II* listed building.

== See also ==
- Listed buildings in Low Worsall
