= Listed buildings in High Worsall =

High Worsall is a civil parish in the county of North Yorkshire, England. It contains three listed buildings that are recorded in the National Heritage List for England. All the listed buildings are designated at Grade II, the lowest of the three grades, which is applied to "buildings of national importance and special interest". The parish contains the hamlet of High Worsdell and the surrounding countryside, and all the listed buildings are farmhouses.

== Buildings ==
Name and location	Photograph	Date	Notes
West Worsall Farmhouse; 54.45696°N 1.42077°W		Late 17th to early 18th century	The farmhouse is in pinkish brick, the front rendered, with a partial floor band, a stepped and dentilled eaves cornice, and a pantile roof with brick copings and kneelers. There are two storeys, the building is in two parts, each with two bays, at the rear is a lean-to, and to the east is a lower extension. The left part contains casement windows, elsewhere the windows are horizontally-sliding sashes, and at the rear are slit vents.
Fardeanside House; 54.47344°N 1.42474°W		Mid 18th century	The farmhouse is in red brick, and it has a pantile roof with stone gable copings and kneelers. There are two storeys and four bays. In the centre is a glazed porch, and the windows are casements under flat gauged brick arches.
Holme Farmhouse; 54.48608°N 1.40746°W	—	Late 18th century	The farmhouse is in red brick, with stepped eaves and a tile roof. There are two storeys, the main block has two bays, and to the right is a lower two-bay extension. The windows in the extension are horizontally-sliding sashes, and elsewhere they are casements, those in the ground floor under flat gauged brick arches.
