= Parson-naturalist =

Priest who sees the study of natural science as an extension of his religious work

A parson-naturalist was a cleric (a "parson", strictly defined as a country priest who held the living of a parish, but the term is generally extended to other clergy), who often saw the study of natural science as an extension of his religious work. The philosophy entailed the belief that God, as the creator of all things, wanted man to understand his creations and thus to study them by collecting and classifying organisms and other natural phenomena.

The natural theologians John Ray (1627–1705) and William Paley (1743–1805) argued that the elaborate complexity of the world of nature was evidence for the existence of a creator. Accordingly, a parson-naturalist frequently made use of his insights into philosophy and theology when interpreting what he observed in natural history.

== History ==
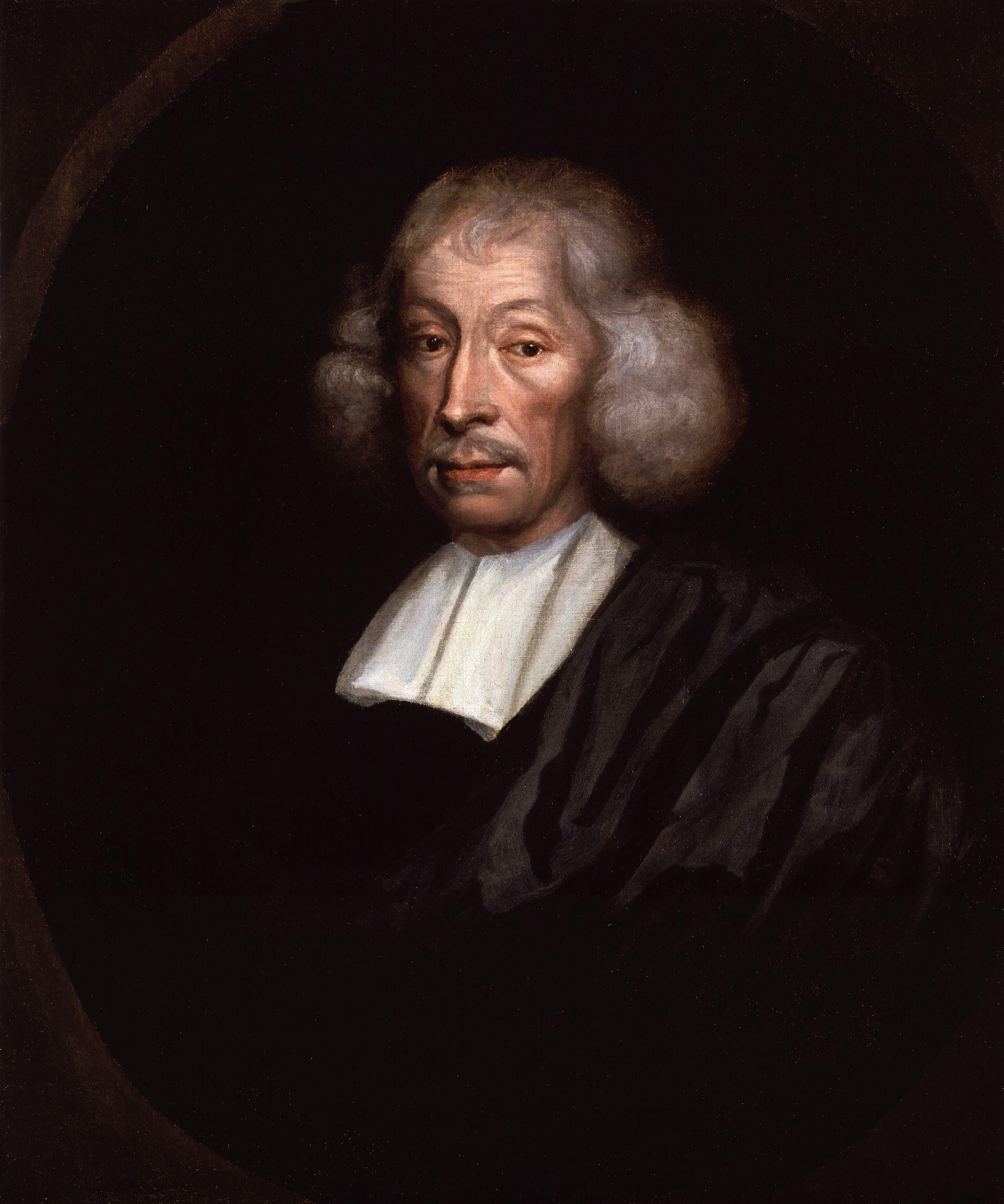
The parson-naturalist John Ray, by an unknown 18th century artist

=== Early history ===
The tradition of clerical naturalists may be traced back to some monastic writings of the Middle Ages, although some argue that their writings about animals and plants cannot be correctly classified as natural history. Notable early parson-naturalists were William Turner (1508–1568), John Ray (1627–1705), William Derham (1657–1735), and Gilbert White (1720–1793).

=== Proliferation ===
The 19th century witnessed the wide proliferation of the tradition, which continued into the 20th century. Among the 19th century parson-naturalists were for instance George Thomas Rudd (1795-1847), John Stevens Henslow (1796–1861), Leonard Jenyns (1800–1893), William Darwin Fox (1805–1880), Charles William Benson (1836–1919) and Francis Linley Blathwayt (1875–1953).

Charles Darwin aspired to be a parson-naturalist until his return from his voyage aboard Beagle.

=== After 1900 ===
Parson-naturalism declined in the twentieth century. Armstrong covers two men, the ornithologist Charles Earle Raven (1885–1964) and his own father, Edward Allworthy Armstrong (1900–1978), whom he describes as an authority on "bird behaviour and bird song". The Times publishes a letter every year from the Reverend Prebendary John Woolmer recording the status of the dung-feeding forest butterfly, the purple emperor. Woolmer has a stole embroidered with butterflies for the service he holds in a Northamptonshire woodland "to bless the forest rides". Woolmer wrote the book The Grand Surprise: Butterflies and the Kingdom of Heaven.

== See also ==
- Christianity and science
- List of Catholic cleric-scientists
- Natural theology

== Sources ==
- Armstrong, Patrick (2000). The English Parson-naturalist: A Companionship Between Science and Religion. Gracewing. ISBN 978-0-85244-516-7.
- Clark, J.P.M. (2009). "The Politics of Insects". Bugs and the Victorians. Yale University Press. pp. 26–28. ISBN 978-0300150919.
- Worster, Donald (1994). "The education of a scientist". Nature's Economy: A History of Ecological Ideas (2 ed.). Cambridge, England: Cambridge University Press. ISBN 0-521-46834-5.
