= Listed buildings in Low Worsall =

Low Worsall is a civil parish in the county of North Yorkshire, England. It contains ten listed buildings that are recorded in the National Heritage List for England. Of these, one is listed at Grade II*, the middle of the three grades, and the others are at Grade II, the lowest grade. The parish contains the village of Low Worsall and the surrounding countryside. The most important building in the parish is Worsall Hall, which is listed, together with associated structures. The other listed buildings are houses, a bridge, a church and a shelter.

== Key ==
Grade	Criteria
II*	Particularly important buildings of more than special interest
II	Buildings of national importance and special interest

== Buildings ==
Name and location	Photograph	Date	Notes	Grade
Worsall Hall; 54.48504°N 1.39566°W		Early 18th century	The house is in pinkish-red brick, with a pantile roof, a stone ridge, and one coped gable with a kneeler. The main block has three storeys and two bays, there is a right wing with two taller storeys and one bay, and a left wing with two storeys and a gabled projection on the left return. In the right part is a canted bay window. Most of the windows are sashes in architraves, with gauged flat brick arches, and there are two casement windows.	II*
West wall of kitchen garden, Worsall Hall; 54.48466°N 1.39485°W	—	Early 18th century	The wall is in red brick with flat stone coping and buttresses. It is about 10 feet (3.0 m) high, reducing to 6 feet (1.8 m).	II
Worsall Grange; 54.48000°N 1.38307°W	—	Early 18th century	The house, which was extended in the 19th century, is pebbledashed, and has a Welsh slate roof with concrete kneelers. There are two storeys, one part with two bays, and the other with three. In the older part are casement windows and a French window. The later part has a doorway flanked by two-storey canted bay windows. The windows in this part are sashes.	II
Piersburgh Grange and granary wing 54.48467°N 1.39201°W	—	Early to mid 18th century	The house, at one time an inn, is in red brick with stepped eaves courses, and a roof in pantile with brick coping and kneelers. There are two storeys and three bays. In the centre is a gabled porch, and the windows are sashes in architraves, with gauged flat brick arches. Inside, there is an inglenook fireplace.	II
Ha-ha wall, gates and gate piers, Worsall Hall; 54.48492°N 1.39573°W		18th century	The ha-ha wall is in red brick with gabled stone coping. It is ramped up at the west end to a square brick pier. The wall is also ramped up at the east end to the entrance to the drive. This is flanked by two tall gate piers with punched rustication, outside which are smaller piers, and between them are wrought iron gates. The piers have cornices and wrought iron gates.	II
Mourie House Cottages; 54.48738°N 1.38038°W	—	1757	The house, later divided into three, is in pinkish brick, with stepped eaves courses, and a roof partly in pantile and partly in concrete tile, with brick coping and kneelers. There are two storeys, three bays, and a later extension to the right. On the front is a porch, there are two fixed windows with opening panels, three modern windows with small panes, and at the rear is a small-paned sash window.	II
Dovecote east of Worsall Hall; 54.48497°N 1.39473°W	—	Early 19th century	The dovecote is in red brick with a hipped pantile roof. There are thee low stages, an oblong plan, and two doorways, with pigeon holes in the upper segmental relieving arch.	II
Worsall Bridge; 54.48273°N 1.38499°W	—	Early 19th century	The bridge carries a road over Hole Beck. It is in stone, and consists of a single round arch with cut voussoirs extending to fill a recessed square panel headed by the parapet band. The parapet has rounded coping, the ends are slightly splayed, and they end in round domed piers.	II
All Saints' Church; 54.48256°N 1.39004°W		1894	The church is in stone with a Lakeland slate roof, and is in Early English style. It consists of a nave, a south porch, and a chancel with north vestry. On the west gable is a bellcote.	II
Shelter; 54.48424°N 1.39318°W		1920s (probable)	The shelter is in stone with a stone slate roof and a tall lead ball finial. It has a circular plan, and the doorway is flanked by open panels. The door jambs and panel divisions have a circular plan. Inside, there is radial stone paving, and an octagonal king post.	II
