= List of Time Team episodes =

The following is a list of episodes of Time Team, a British television/web programme about archaeology, that aired on Channel 4 from 16 January 1994 to 7 September 2014.

In 2022 Time Team returned on YouTube, with series 21 onwards presented by Gus Casely-Hayford. It was first made available on 18 March 2022. This was followed by series 22 in 2023, with a new special episode, "Digging Band of Brothers", which was presented by a returning Tony Robinson.

The episode numbers follow the order of the first transmission.

== Series overview ==
Series	Episodes	Originally released		
Series	Episodes	First released	Last released	Network
1	4	16 January 1994	6 February 1994	Channel 4
2	5	8 January 1995	5 February 1995	Channel 4
3	6	7 January 1996	11 February 1996	Channel 4
4	6	5 January 1997	9 February 1997	Channel 4
5	8	4 January 1998	1 March 1998	Channel 4
6	13	3 January 1999	28 March 1999	Channel 4
7	13	2 January 2000	26 March 2000	Channel 4
8	13	7 January 2001	1 April 2001	Channel 4
9	13	6 January 2002	31 March 2002	Channel 4
10	14	5 January 2003	30 March 2003	Channel 4
11	13	4 January 2004	28 March 2004	Channel 4
12	21	2 January 2005	3 April 2005	Channel 4
13	13	22 January 2006	16 April 2006	Channel 4
14	14	14 January 2007	8 April 2007	Channel 4
15	13	6 January 2008	30 March 2008	Channel 4
16	13	4 January 2009	29 March 2009	Channel 4
17	12	18 April 2010	14 November 2010	Channel 4
18	11	6 February 2011	17 April 2011	Channel 4
19	13	22 January 2012	13 May 2012	Channel 4
20	13	11 November 2012	24 March 2013	Channel 4
21	4	20 March 2022	2 July 2023	YouTube & Patreon
22	3	26 March 2023	2023	YouTube & Patreon
23	2	7 April 2024	20 May 2024	YouTube & Patreon
24	TBC	2025	2025	YouTube & Patreon
25	TBC	2026	2026	YouTube & Patreon

== Episodes ==
=== Pilot ===
No. overall	No. in season	Title	Location	Coordinates	Original release date
0	0	"Pilot"	Dorchester, Oxfordshire	51.643934°N 1.165309°W	Unaired

=== Series 1 (1994) ===
No. overall	No. in season	Title	Location	Coordinates	Original release date
1	1	"The Guerrilla Base of the King"	Athelney, Somerset	51.059011°N 2.936678°W	16 January 1994
2	2	"On the Edge of an Empire"	Ribchester, Lancashire	53.811145°N 2.532268°W	23 January 1994
3	3	"The New Town of a Norman Prince"	Much Wenlock, Shropshire	52.595906°N 2.557250°W	30 January 1994
4	4	"The Fortress in the Lake"	Llangorse Lake, Powys	51.933672°N 3.268508°W	6 February 1994

=== Series 2 (1995) ===
No. overall	No. in season	Title	Location	Coordinates	Original release date
5	1	"Lord of the Isles"	Finlaggan, Islay	55.834867°N 6.171225°W	8 January 1995
6	2	"The Saxon Graves"	Winterbourne Gunner, Wiltshire	51.115883°N 1.740619°W	15 January 1995
7	3	"The Lost Villa"	Tockenham, Wiltshire	51.512439°N 1.944539°W	22 January 1995
8	4	"The Archbishop's Back Garden"	Lambeth Palace, London	51.496999°N 0.118650°W	29 January 1995
9	5	"Medieval Dining Hall"	Hylton Castle, Sunderland	54.92253°N 1.44318°W	5 February 1995

=== Series 3 (1996) ===
No. overall	No. in season	Title	Location	Coordinates	Original release date
10	1	"Prehistoric Fogou"	Boleigh, Cornwall; Treveneague, Cornwall	50.071303°N 5.582972°W; 50.129124°N 5.434687°W	7 January 1996
11	2	"Hunting for Mammoth"	Stanton Harcourt, Oxfordshire	51.741998°N 1.402281°W	14 January 1996
12	3	"Village of the Templars"	Templecombe, Somerset	50.997661°N 2.415219°W	21 January 1996
13	4	"A Wreck of the Spanish Armada"	Teignmouth, Devon	50.548171°N 3.489410°W	28 January 1996
14	5	"Palace of the Irish Kings"	Emain Macha; Creeveroe; Haughey's Fort; Ballydoo	54.3453°N 6.7186°W; 54.3489°N 6.7076°W; 54.3499°N 6.7140°W; 54.3494°N 6.7317°W	4 February 1996
15	6	"Treasures of the Roman Field"	Lavenham, Suffolk	52.12409°N 0.83037°E	11 February 1996

=== Series 4 (1997) ===
No. overall	No. in season	Title	Location	Coordinates	Original release date
16	1	"Episode One (Maryland, USA)"	St. Mary's City, Maryland, United States	38.189167°N 76.432222°W	5 January 1997
17	2	"Episode Two (Mystery of the Cornish Skeletons)"	Launceston, Cornwall	50.639822°N 4.334246°W	12 January 1997
18	3	"Steam-Powered Mint"	Soho, Birmingham	52.498633°N 1.923911°W	19 January 1997
19	4	"8th Century Church"	Govan, Glasgow	55.864368°N 4.312815°W	26 January 1997
20	5	"Norman and Medieval Castles"	Malton, North Yorkshire	54.134507°N 0.792469°W	2 February 1997
21	6	"Roman Villa"	Netheravon, Wiltshire	51.232406°N 1.789822°W	9 February 1997

=== Series 5 (1998) ===
No. overall	No. in season	Title	Location	Coordinates	Original release date
23	1	"Episode One (Search for Richmond Palace)"	Richmond, Surrey	51.460373°N 0.310116°W	4 January 1998
24	2	"Episode Two (Somerset Levels)"	Greylake, Somerset	51.098932°N 2.869454°W	11 January 1998
25	3	"Episode Three (Sanday, Orkney)"	Sanday, Orkney	59.264121°N 2.60732°W	18 January 1998
26	4	"Turkdean"	Turkdean, Gloucestershire	51.86964°N 1.85854°W	25 January 1998
27	5	"Episode Five (Beaker Settlement, Mallorca, Spain)"	Deià, Mallorca, Spain	39.712479°N 2.600798°E	1 February 1998
28	6	"Episode Six (Aston Eyre)"	Aston Eyre, Shropshire	52.543986°N 2.513156°W	8 February 1998
29	7	"Episode Seven (Cathedral Hill, Downpatrick, County Down)"	Downpatrick, County Down	54.327224°N 5.721692°W	22 February 1998
30	8	"Episode Eight (High Worsall)"	High Worsall, North Yorkshire	54.478678°N 1.405971°W	1 March 1998

=== Series 6 (1999) ===
No. overall	No. in season	Title	Location	Coordinates	Original release date
31	1	"Wedgwood's First Factory"	Burslem, Stoke-on-Trent	53.045818°N 2.196994°W	3 January 1999
32	2	"Episode Two (Roman Building, Papcastle, Cumbria)"	Papcastle, Cumbria	54.668705°N 3.380394°W	10 January 1999
33	3	"Episode Three (Dominican Friary, Thetford, Norfolk)"	Thetford, Norfolk	52.413928°N 0.744887°E	17 January 1999
34	4	"Cooper's Hole"	Cheddar Gorge, Somerset	51.282857°N 2.763778°W	24 January 1999
35	5	"Episode Five (Plympton, Devon)"	Plympton, Devon	50.382626°N 4.047981°W	31 January 1999
36	6	"Episode Six (Medieval Dockyard, Smallhythe, Kent)"	Smallhythe, Kent	51.038072°N 0.700398°E	7 February 1999
37	7	"Episode Seven (Roman Bath-house, Beauport Park, Sussex)"	Beauport Park, East Sussex	50.902470°N 0.539778°E	14 February 1999
38	8	"Bombers in Reedham Marshes"	Reedham marshes, Norfolk	52.578406°N 1.586435°E	21 February 1999
39	9	"Turkdean II"	Turkdean, Gloucestershire	51.869354°N 1.858265°W	28 February 1999
40	10	"Episode Ten (Bronze Age, Kemerton, Worcestershire)"	Kemerton, Worcestershire	52.028665°N 2.086049°W	7 March 1999
41	11	"Episode Eleven (Norman Church, Bawsey, Norfolk)"	Bawsey, Norfolk	52.759183°N 0.462398°E	14 March 1999
42	12	"Nevis (Part 1 of 2)"	Nevis, West Indies	17.152638°N 62.612752°W	21 March 1999
43	13	"Nevis (Part 2 of 2)"	Nevis, West Indies	17.152638°N 62.612752°W (Montravers Estate); 17.182401°N 62.619952°W (Jamestown)	28 March 1999

=== Series 7 (2000) ===
No. overall	No. in season	Title	Location	Historical period	Coordinates	Original release date
46	1	"A Muslim Port in Spain"	Denia, Spain	Medieval, Islamic	38.840361°N 0.113166°E; 38.836944°N 0.101667°E	2 January 2000
47	2	"The Mosaic at the Bottom of the Garden"	Cirencester, Gloucestershire	Roman	51.712179°N 1.961577°W	9 January 2000
48	3	"One of the First Spitfires Lost in France"	Wierre-Effroy, France	World War II	50.778998°N 1.741021°E	16 January 2000
49	4	"An Iron-Age Roundhouse and a Henge"	Waddon, Dorset	Iron Age, Medieval, Neolithic	50.670234°N 2.545086°W	23 January 2000
50	5	"Hadrian's Wall"	Birdoswald, Cumbria	Roman	54.989232°N 2.604935°W	30 January 2000
51	6	"In Search of the Earliest Traces of Mankind"	Elveden, Suffolk	Palaeolithic	52.392274°N 0.658067°E; 52.373908°N 0.753570°E	6 February 2000
52	7	"The Missing Cathedral and the Diabetic Prior"	Coventry, West Midlands	Medieval	52.409056°N 1.508557°W	13 February 2000
53	8	"The Royalists' Last Stand"	Basing House, Hampshire	English Civil War	51.270322°N 1.052882°W	20 February 2000
54	9	"A Bronze-Age Barrow and Walkway"	Flag Fen, Cambridgeshire	Bronze Age	52.575829°N 0.184500°W	27 February 2000
55	10	"In Search of the Palace of King Offa"	Sutton St Nicholas, Herefordshire	Anglo-Saxon, Medieval	52.109097°N 2.702415°W	5 March 2000
56	11	"A Roman Temple in Sight of the Millennium Dome"	Greenwich, London	Roman	51.478560°N 0.004462°E	12 March 2000
57	12	"Nuns in Northumbria"	Hartlepool, County Durham	Anglo-Saxon, Medieval	54.695233°N 1.180206°W	19 March 2000
58	13	"York"	York, Yorkshire	Roman, Viking, Medieval	53.959484°N 1.091878°W53.956753°N 1.075464°W53.961269°N 1.086653°W	26 March 2000

=== Series 8 (2001) ===
No. overall	No. in season	Title	Location	Historical period	Coordinates	Original release date
61	1	"An Anglo-Saxon Cemetery in Lincolnshire"	Normanton, Lincolnshire	Anglo-Saxon, Roman	53.003676°N 0.601684°W	7 January 2001
62	2	"The Man Who Bought a Castle"	Alderton, Northamptonshire	Anglo-Saxon	52.116304°N 0.919547°W	14 January 2001
63	3	"The Celtic Spring"	Llygadwy, Powys	Iron Age, Neolithic	51.884672°N 3.234257°W	21 January 2001
64	4	"A Waltham Villa"	Waltham Field, Whittington, Gloucestershire	Roman	51.886678°N 1.991152°W	28 January 2001
65	5	"The 'Lost Viaduct'"	Blaenavon, Torfaen	Industrial Revolution	51.779242°N 3.090618°W	4 February 2001
66	6	"A Palace Sold for Scrap"	Rycote, Thame, Oxfordshire	14th century–Georgian	51.737413°N 1.035237°W	11 February 2001
67	7	"An Iron-Age Roundhouse"	Salisbury Plain, Wiltshire	Iron Age	51.257064°N 1.737308°W	18 February 2001
68	8	"The Bone Caves"	Alveston, Gloucestershire	Iron Age	51.582499°N 2.530707°W	25 February 2001
69	9	"The Inter-City Villa"	Basildon, Berkshire	Roman	51.509468°N 1.126886°W	4 March 2001
71	10	"Holy Island"	Lindisfarne, Northumberland	16th–17th century	55.670528°N 1.798928°W	11 March 2001
72	11	"The Leaning Tower of Bridgnorth"	Bridgnorth, Shropshire	Norman	52.532008°N 2.419660°W	18 March 2001
73	12	"Three Tales of Canterbury"	Canterbury, Kent	Roman, Medieval	51.278405°N 1.077766°E; 51.298132°N 1.075053°E; 51.279102°N 1.076270°E	25 March 2001
74	13	"The Leper Hospital"	Winchester, Hampshire	Medieval	51.063401°N 1.280206°W	1 April 2001

=== Series 9 (2002) ===
No. overall	No. in season	Title	Location	Historical period	Coordinates	Original release date
77	1	"London's First Bridge"	Vauxhall, London	Bronze Age	51.485502°N 0.127807°W	6 January 2002
78	2	"The Roman's Panic"	Ancaster, Lincolnshire	Roman	52.980295°N 0.533225°W	13 January 2002
79	3	"Diving for the Armada"	Kinlochbervie, Sutherland	Tudor	58.433263°N 5.112194°W	20 January 2002
80	4	"The Naughty Monastery"	Chicksands, Bedfordshire	14th century	52.040364°N 0.366011°W	27 January 2002
81	5	"The Furnace in the Cellar"	Ironbridge Gorge, Shropshire	Industrial Revolution	52.646124°N 2.577345°W	3 February 2002
82	6	"An Ermine Street Pub"	Cheshunt, Hertfordshire	Roman	51.720624°N 0.054145°W	10 February 2002
83	7	"Iron-Age Market"	Helford, Cornwall	Iron Age	50.077478°N 5.179886°W	17 February 2002
84	8	"Siege House in Shropshire"	High Ercall, Shropshire	English Civil War, Medieval	52.752459°N 2.602659°W	24 February 2002
85	9	"A Prehistoric Airfield"	Throckmorton, Worcestershire	Iron Age, Bronze Age	52.140294°N 2.042171°W	3 March 2002
86	10	"A Lost Roman City"	Castleford, Yorkshire	Roman	53.724441°N 1.355467°W	10 March 2002
87	11	"Every Castle Needs a Lord"	Beaudesert, Warwickshire	Medieval	52.293401°N 1.772098°W	17 March 2002
88	12	"Steptoe Et Filius"	Yaverland, Isle of Wight	Iron Age, Bronze Age, Roman, Anglo-Saxon	50.671732°N 1.132267°W	24 March 2002
89	13	"Seven Buckets and a Buckle"	Breamore, Hampshire	Anglo-Saxon	50.954994°N 1.772017°W	31 March 2002

=== Series 10 (2003) ===
No. overall	No. in season	Title	Location	Historical period	Coordinates	Original release date
93	1	"Garden Secrets"	Raunds, Northamptonshire	Anglo-Saxon, Bronze Age	52.344620°N 0.539447°W	5 January 2003
94	2	"Mosaics, Mosaics, Mosaics"	Dinnington, Somerset	Roman	50.917925°N 2.849794°W	12 January 2003
95	3	"Peak District Practices"	Carsington, Derbyshire	Neolithic, Iron Age	53.080321°N 1.640260°W	19 January 2003
96	4	"The Giant's Grave"	Fetlar, Shetland	Viking	60.594185°N 0.867257°W; 60.588197°N 0.832585°W	26 January 2003
97	5	"Joust Dig It"	Greenwich, London	Tudor	51.482230°N 0.004201°W	2 February 2003
98	6	"Digging Liberty"	Merton, London	Victorian	51.413519°N 0.183752°W	9 February 2003
99	7	"Death in a Crescent"	Bath, Somerset	Roman	51.387727°N 2.366371°W	16 February 2003
100	8	"Back to Our Roots (Note: This is the official 100th episode and the team revisit the site they visited in episode 1)"	Athelney, Somerset	Anglo-Saxon, Iron Age, Viking	51.058863°N 2.934671°W	23 February 2003
101	9	"Looking for the White House"	Kew Gardens, London	Georgian	51.483024°N 0.294354°W	2 March 2003
102	10	"Rescuing the Dead"	Leven, Fife	Bronze Age	56.207395°N 3.003143°W	9 March 2003
103	11	"Not a Blot on the Landscape"	Castle Howard, North Yorkshire	Stuart	54.120905°N 0.908317°W	16 March 2003
104	12	"A View to a Kiln"	Sedgefield, County Durham	Roman	54.655019°N 1.459104°W	23 March 2003
105	13	"Jailhouse Rocks"	Appleby-in-Westmorland, Cumbria	19th century – Victorian	54.578305°N 2.488259°W	30 March 2003

=== Series 11 (2004) ===
No. overall	No. in season	Title	Location	Historical period	Coordinates	Original release date
108	1	"In Search of the Brigittine Abbey"	Syon House, London	Tudor	51.476340°N 0.311899°W	4 January 2004
109	2	"A Roman Bath House and Edwardian Folly"	Whitestaunton Manor, Somerset	Roman	50.8897032°N 3.0248144°W	11 January 2004
110	3	"The Crannog in the Loch"	Loch Migdale, Scottish Highlands	Iron Age	57.892503°N 4.319505°W	18 January 2004
111	4	"Saxon Burials on the Ridge"	South Carlton, Lincolnshire	Anglo-Saxon, Bronze Age	53.281810°N 0.566168°W	25 January 2004
112	5	"The Roman Fort That Wasn't There"	Syndale, Kent	Roman	51.313727°N 0.860548°E	1 February 2004
113	6	"An Iron-Age Trading Centre"	Green Island, Dorset	Iron Age	50.67893°N 1.990799°W	8 February 2004
114	7	"A Medieval Blast Furnace"	The Old Furnace, Oakamoor, Staffordshire	Medieval	52.98913°N 1.939713°W	15 February 2004
115	8	"Rescuing a Mesolithic Foreshore"	Goldcliff, Newport	Mesolithic	51.532536°N 2.903950°W	22 February 2004
116	9	"Fertile Soils, Rich Archaeology"	Wittenham Clumps, Oxfordshire	Iron Age	51.627914°N 1.180515°W	29 February 2004
117	10	"King Cnut's Manor"	Nassington, Northamptonshire	Early Medieval	52.552655°N 0.433747°W	7 March 2004
118	11	"Back-Garden Archaeology Revisiting a Roman villa"	Ipswich, Suffolk	Roman	52.076522°N 1.132127°E	14 March 2004
119	12	"The Lost City of Roxburgh"	Roxburgh, Scottish Borders	Medieval	55.597499°N 2.448431°W	21 March 2004
121	13	"Brimming with Remains"	Cranborne Chase, Dorset	Roman	50.928594°N 2.039061°W	28 March 2004

=== Series 12 (2005) ===
No. overall	No. in season	Title	Location	Coordinates	Original release date
125	1	"The Manor That's Back to Front"	Chenies Manor House, Buckinghamshire	51.674775°N 0.533114°W	2 January 2005
126	2	"The Monastery and the Mansion"	Nether Poppleton, North Yorkshire	53.988279°N 1.148894°W	9 January 2005
127	3	"The Bombers in the Marsh"	Warton, Lancashire	53.735285°N 2.935246°W	16 January 2005
128	4	"Fighting on the Frontier"	Drumlanrig, Dumfries and Galloway	55.271321°N 3.807620°W	23 January 2005
129	5	"A Neolithic Cathedral?"	Northborough, Cambridgeshire	52.662008°N 0.291830°W	30 January 2005
130	6	"In Search of Henry V's Flagship, Grace Dieu"	Bursledon, Hampshire	50.891844°N 1.288816°W	6 February 2005
131	7	"Going Upmarket with the Romans"	Standish, Gloucestershire	51.778168°N 2.290930°W	13 February 2005
132	8	"Picts and Hermits: Cave Dwellers of Fife"	Wemyss, Fife	56.162351°N 3.057839°W	20 February 2005
133	9	"Lost Centuries of St Osyth"	St Osyth, Essex	51.798826°N 1.063060°E	27 February 2005
134	10	"The Puzzle of Picket's Farm"	South Perrott, Dorset	50.844866°N 2.752691°W	6 March 2005
135	11	"Norman Neighbours"	Skipsea, East Riding of Yorkshire	53.967614°N 0.213551°W	13 March 2005
136	12	"Hunting the Romans in South Shields - Tower Blocks and Togas"	South Shields, Tyne and Wear	55.000462°N 1.432911°W	20 March 2005
137	13	"Animal Farm"	Hanslope, Buckinghamshire	52.126082°N 0.873735°W	3 April 2005

=== Series 13 (2006) ===
No. overall	No. in season	Title	Location	Coordinates	Original release date
143	1	"The Bodies in the Shed - Glendon's Lost Graveyard"	Glendon, Northamptonshire	52.423777°N 0.757779°W	22 January 2006
144	2	"Villas out of Molehills"	Withington, Gloucestershire	51.832918°N 1.952569°W	29 January 2006
145	3	"Rubble at the Mill"	Manchester, Greater Manchester	53.487311°N 2.236522°W	5 February 2006
146	4	"The First Tudor Palace?"	Esher, Surrey	51.373740°N 0.376815°W	12 February 2006
147	5	"The Boat on the Rhine - A Roman Boat in Utrecht"	Utrecht, Netherlands	52.080317°N 5.023004°E	19 February 2006
148	6	"Court of the Kentish King"	Eastry, Kent	51.256012°N 1.312794°E	26 February 2006
149	7	"The Monks' Manor"	Brimham, Harrogate, North Yorkshire	54.062747°N 1.662743°W	5 March 2006
150	8	"Castle in the Round"	Queenborough, Kent	51.416134°N 0.748727°E	12 March 2006
151	9	"Sussex Ups and Downs"	Blackpatch, West Sussex	50.874978°N 0.443323°W	19 March 2006
152	10	"Birthplace of the Confessor"	Islip, Oxfordshire	51.825050°N 1.232742°W	26 March 2006
153	11	"Early Bath"	Ffrith, Flintshire	53.090283°N 3.069603°W	2 April 2006
154	12	"The Taxman's Tavern - A Roman Mansio"	Alfoldean, Horsham, West Sussex	51.0852°N 0.4046°W	9 April 2006
155	13	"Scotch Broch"	Applecross, Scottish Highlands	57.43176°N 5.81387°W	16 April 2006

=== Series 14 (2007) ===
No. overall	No. in season	Title	Location	Coordinates	Original release date
158	1	"Finds on the Fairway"	Mount Murray, Isle of Man	54.140615°N 4.552331°W	14 January 2007
159	2	"There's No Place Like Rome"	Blacklands, near Frome, Somerset	51.285410°N 2.336253°W	21 January 2007
160	3	"School Diggers Medieval"	Hooke Court, Dorset	50.800806°N 2.666475°W	28 January 2007
161	4	"The Druids' Last Stand"	Amlwch, Anglesey	53.405465°N 4.395224°W	4 February 2007
162	5	"Sharpe's Redoubt"	Sandgate, Kent	51.076135°N 1.130013°E	11 February 2007
163	6	"A Port and Stilton"	Stilton, Cambridgeshire	52.493863°N 0.279640°W	18 February 2007
164	7	"A Tale of Two Villages"	Wicken, Northamptonshire	52.048170°N 0.914954°W; 52.046576°N 0.919587°W	25 February 2007
166	8	"No Stone Unturned"	Warburton, Greater Manchester	53.396554°N 2.438536°W	4 March 2007
167	9	"The Domesday Mill"	Dotton, Devon	50.689403°N 3.295137°W	11 March 2007
168	10	"The Cheyne Gang"	Chesham Bois, Buckinghamshire	51.688032°N 0.600434°W	18 March 2007
169	11	"Road to the Relics"	Godstone, Surrey	51.240100°N 0.0666°W	25 March 2007
170	12	"The Abbey Habit"	Poulton, Cheshire	53.125909°N 2.888253°W	1 April 2007
171	13	"In the Shadow of the Tor"	Bodmin Moor, Cornwall	50.603806°N 4.627464°W	8 April 2007

=== Series 15 (2008) ===
No. overall	No. in season	Title	Location	Coordinates	Original release date
175	1	"Gold in the Moat"	Codnor Castle, Derbyshire	53.045125°N 1.354947°W	6 January 2008
176	2	"Street of the Dead"	Binchester, County Durham	54.676036°N 1.674253°W	13 January 2008
178	3	"Bodies in the Dunes"	Allasdale, Barra, Western Isles	56.995162°N 7.509125°W	20 January 2008
179	4	"The Naughty Nuns of Northampton"	Towcester, Northamptonshire	52.150658°N 0.952810°W	27 January 2008
180	5	"Mysteries of the Mosaic"	Coberley, Gloucestershire	51.835399°N 2.049679°W	3 February 2008
181	6	"Blitzkrieg on Shooter's Hill"	South London	51.470522°N 0.071049°E; 51.470403°N 0.055911°E; 51.473722°N 0.071168°E	10 February 2008
182	7	"Keeping up with the Georgians"	Hunstrete, Somerset	51.356569°N 2.509777°W	17 February 2008
183	8	"Saxons on the Edge"	Stonton Wyville, Leicestershire	52.533367°N 0.908772°W	24 February 2008
185	9	"Fort of the Earls"	Dungannon, Northern Ireland	54.5058°N 6.7674°W	2 March 2008
186	10	"From Constantinople to Cornwall"	Padstow, North Cornwall	50.556811°N 4.951477°W	9 March 2008
187	11	"Five Thousand Tons of Stone"	Hamsterley, County Durham	54.692457°N 1.840365°W	16 March 2008
188	12	"The Romans Recycle"	Wickenby, Lincolnshire	53.336229°N 0.358506°W	23 March 2008
189	13	"Hunting King Harold"	Portskewett, Monmouthshire	51.589040°N 2.725399°W	30 March 2008

=== Series 16 (2009) ===
No. overall	No. in season	Title	Location	Coordinates	Original release date
194	1	"The Trouble with Temples"	Friar's Wash, Hertfordshire	51.8193°N 0.4045°W	4 January 2009
195	2	"The Wedding Present"	Scargill, County Durham	54.49173°N 1.91868°W	11 January 2009
196	3	"Heroes' Hill"	Knockdhu, County Antrim	54.89111°N 5.905278°W	18 January 2009
197	4	"Toga Town"	Caerwent, Monmouthshire	51.6133°N 2.7700°W	25 January 2009
198	5	"Blood, Sweat and Beers"	Rise Hill, Cumbria	54.29789°N 2.35983°W	1 February 2009
199	6	"Buried Bishops and Belfries"	Salisbury Cathedral, Wiltshire	51.064722°N 1.7975°W	8 February 2009
200	7	"Anarchy in the UK"	Radcot, Oxfordshire	51.693081°N 1.588644°W	15 February 2009
201	8	"Mystery of the Ice Cream Villa"	Colworth, Bedfordshire	52.23212°N 0.57711°W	22 February 2009
202	9	"Hermit Harbour"	Looe, Cornwall	50.34086°N 4.45412°W	1 March 2009
203	10	"Called to the Bar"	Lincoln's Inn, London	51.516448°N 0.113760°W	8 March 2009
204	11	"Beacon on the Fens"	Chapel Head, Cambridgeshire	52.415706°N 0.028039°W	15 March 2009
205	12	"The Hollow Way"	Ulnaby, County Durham	54.549014°N 1.649417°W	22 March 2009
206	13	"Skeletons in the Shed"	Blythburgh, Suffolk	52.32183°N 1.59640°E	29 March 2009

=== Series 17 (2010) ===
No. overall	No. in season	Title	Location	Coordinates	Original release date
210	1	"Corridors of Power"	Westminster Abbey, London	51°29′58″N 0°07′39″W	18 April 2010
211	2	"A Saintly Site"	Isle of Mull, Inner Hebrides	56°36′42″N 6°04′52″W	25 April 2010
212	3	"Bridge Over the River Tees"	Piercebridge, County Durham	54°32′7″N 1°40′28″W	2 May 2010
213	4	"In the Halls of a Saxon King"	Sutton Courtenay, Oxfordshire (actually Drayton, Oxfordshire)	51°38′23″N 1°17′43″W	9 May 2010
214	5	"The Massacre in the Cellar"	Hopton Castle, Shropshire	52°23′45″N 2°55′54″W	16 May 2010
216	6	"Potted History"	Mildenhall, Wiltshire	51°25′23″N 1°41′27″W	23 May 2010
218	7	"Death and Dominoes: The First POW Camp"	Norman Cross, Cambridgeshire	52°30′20″N 00°17′25″W	3 October 2010
219	8	"Something for the Weekend"	Tregruk Castle, Llangybi, Monmouthshire	51°40′17″N 2°55′15″W	10 October 2010
221	9	"Governor's Green"	Governor's Green, Portsmouth	50°47′19″N 1°06′11″W	24 October 2010
222	10	"Priory Engagement"	Burford, Oxfordshire	51°48′28″N 1°38′13″W	31 October 2010
223	11	"There Is a Villa Here Somewhere"	Litlington, Cambridgeshire	52°03′57″N 0°05′14″W	7 November 2010
224	12	"Commanding Heights"	Dinmore Hill, Herefordshire	52°09′39″N 2°42′04″W	14 November 2010

=== Series 18 (2011) ===
No. overall	No. in season	Title	Location	Coordinates	Original release date
225	1	"Reservoir Rituals"	Tottiford Reservoir, Devon	50°38′9.6″N 3°40′58.8″W	6 February 2011
226	2	"Saxon Death, Saxon Gold"	West Langton, Leicestershire	52°31′33″N 0°56′24″W	13 February 2011
227	3	"Romans on the Range"	High Ham, Somerset	51°3′42″N 2°49′35″W	20 February 2011
228	4	"Hitler's Island Fortress"	Les Gellettes, Jersey	49°12′35″N 2°9′36″W	27 February 2011
229	5	"Furnace in the Forest"	Derwentcote, County Durham	54°54′14″N 1°47′50″W	6 March 2011
230	6	"Under the Gravestones"	Castor, Cambridgeshire	52°34′22″N 0°20′34″W	13 March 2011
232	7	"House of the White Queen"	Groby, Leicestershire	52°39′50″N 1°13′37″W	20 March 2011
233	8	"Cannons and Castles"	Mont Orgueil, Jersey	49°11′58″N 2°1′10″W	27 March 2011
234	9	"Mystery of the Manor Moat"	Llancaiach Fawr, South Wales	51°39′41″N 3°16′53″W	3 April 2011
235	10	"Search for the Domesday Mill"	Buck Mill, Somerset	51°3′3″N 2°21′49″W	10 April 2011
237	11	"Rooting for the Romans"	Bedford Purlieus Wood, Cambridgeshire	52°35′13″N 00°27′35″W	17 April 2011

=== Series 19 (2012) ===
No. overall	No. in season	Title	Location	Coordinates	Original release date
243	1	"Dig by Wire"	Gateholm Island, Pembrokeshire	51°43′10″N 5°13′50″W	22 January 2012
244	2	"A Village Affair"	Bitterley, Shropshire	52°23′29″N 2°37′56″W	29 January 2012
245	3	"The Drowned Town"	Dunwich, Suffolk	52°16′34″N 1°37′48″E	5 February 2012
246	4	"The First King of Racing"	Newmarket, Suffolk	52°14′38″N 0°24′26″E	12 February 2012
247	5	"Chapel of Secrets"	Beadnell, Northumberland	55°33′04″N 1°37′18″W	19 February 2012
248	6	"A Copper Bottomed Dig"	Pentrechwyth, Swansea	51°38′02″N 3°55′59″W	26 February 2012
249	7	"The Only Earl Is Essex"	Colne Priory, Essex	51°55′36″N 0°42′36″E	4 March 2012
250	8	"Secrets of the Dunes"	Kenfig, Bridgend	51°31′44″N 3°43′44″W	18 March 2012
252	9	"Rome's Wild West"	Caerleon, Newport	51°36′24″N 2°57′58″W	25 March 2012
253	10	"How to Lose a Castle"	Crewkerne, Somerset	50°53′32″N 2°49′29″W	1 April 2012
254	11	"King John's Lost Palace"	Clipstone, Nottinghamshire	53°10′36″N 1°05′56″W	8 April 2012
256	12	"Time Team's Guide to Burial - Compilation"	N/A	N/A	29 April 2012
257	13	"Time Team's Greatest Discoveries - Compilation."	N/A	N/A	13 May 2012

=== Series 20 (2012–13) ===
No. overall	No. in season	Title	Location	Coordinates	Original release date
259	1	"The Forgotten Gunners of WWI"	Grantham, Lincolnshire	52°55′53″N 0°36′50″W	11 November 2012
260	2	"Brancaster"	Brancaster, Norfolk	52°57′50″N 0°39′07″E	6 January 2013
261	3	"A Capital Hill"	Ely, Cardiff	51°28′02″N 3°14′55″W	13 January 2013
262	4	"Henham's Lost Mansions"	Henham Park, Suffolk	52°20′30″N 1°36′4″E	20 January 2013
263	5	"Warriors"	Figheldean, Wiltshire	51°13′16″N 1°45′51″W	27 January 2013
264	6	"Lost Mines of Lakeland"	Coniston, Cumbria	54°22′52″N 3°6′11″W	3 February 2013
265	7	"Horseshoe Hall"	Oakham Castle, Rutland	52°40′15″N 0°43′39″W	10 February 2013
266	8	"Mystery of the Thames-side Villa"	Dropshort, Oxfordshire	51°38′30″N 1°17′14″W	17 February 2013
267	9	"The Lost Castle of Dundrum"	Dundrum Castle, County Down	54°15′43″N 5°50′41″W	24 February 2013
268	10	"Wolsey's Lost Palace"	The More, Moor Park, Hertfordshire	51°38′02″N 0°26′14″W	3 March 2013
269	11	"An Englishman's Castle"	Upton Castle, Cosheston, Pembrokeshire	51°42′25″N 4°52′07″W	10 March 2013
270	12	"The Time Team Guide to Experimental Archaeology"	N/A	N/A	17 March 2013
271	13	"Twenty Years of Time Team"	N/A	N/A	24 March 2013

=== Series 21 (2022) ===
No. overall	No. in season	Title	Location	Coordinates	Original release date
281	1	"Boden Iron Age Fogou (Cornwall)"	Lizard Peninsula, Cornwall	TBA	20 March 2022
282	2	"Broughton Roman Villa"	Broughton Castle, Oxfordshire	TBA	8 April 2022
283	3	"Knights Hospitaller Preceptory"	Halston Hall, Shropshire	TBA	1 April 2023
284	4	"Anglo-Saxon Cemetery"	Winfarthing, Norfolk	TBA	2 July 2023

=== Series 22 (2023) ===
No. overall	No. in season	Title	Location	Original release date
286	1	"Knights Hospitaller Preceptory"	Halston Hall, Whittington	26 March 2023
287	2	"Anglo-Saxon Cemetery"	Winfarthing, Norfolk	2 July 2023
288	3	"Ancient Greek City"	Vlochos, Greece	TBA

=== Series 23 (2024) ===
No. overall	No. in season	Title	Location	Original release date
289	1	"Modbury Community Dig"	Modbury	7 April 2024
290	2	"Secrets of Wytch Farm"	Dorset	20 May 2024

== Specials ==
This is a list of Time Team special episodes that aired between 1997 and 2014. These special episodes often depart somewhat from the regular Time Team format, by revisiting previous sites to do a follow-up story; travelling outside the UK to excavate other sites of interest; chronicling digs overseen by other organisations; or using information gleaned from other Time Team episodes to draw a more complete picture of ordinary life during a particular historical era. Other specials may focus on a dig with a particular holiday theme; a more complex excavation over a longer period than the standard three days; or a visit to a particularly famous historical site.

=== Others ===
Several episodes were created that differed from the standard format, taking the form of documentaries.

No.	Title	Location	Original release date
1	"Time Team History of Britain"	N/A	27 December 2000
2	"Behind the Scenes at Time Team"	N/A	7 January 2001
3	"10 Years of Time Team"	N/A	27 December 2002

== See also ==
- Time Team Podcast
- Time Team Live
- Time Team History Hunters
- Time Team Digs
- Time Team Extra
- Time Team America
