= Worsall Hall =

Listed building in North Yorkshire, England

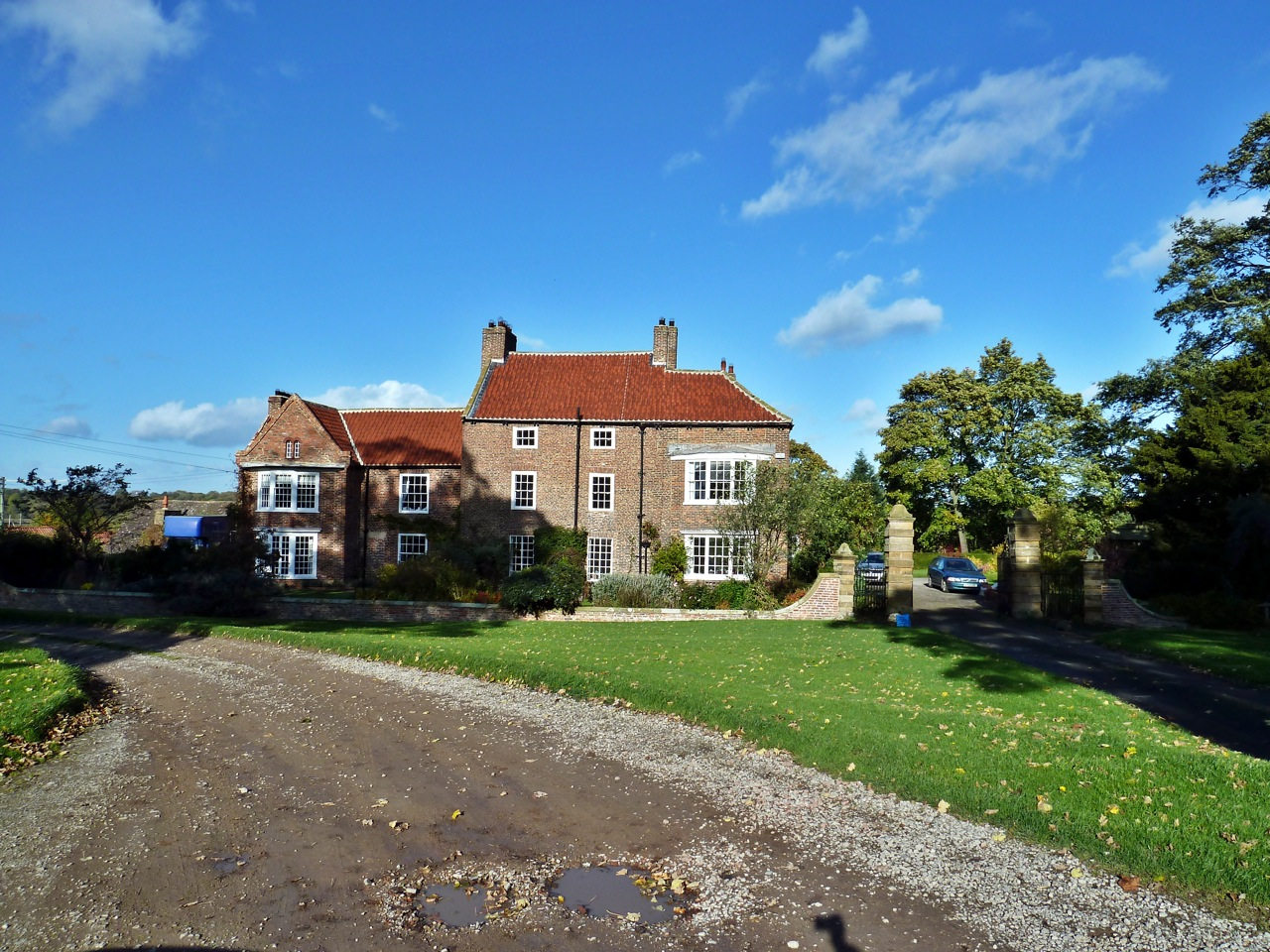
- The building in 2010

General information
- Address: Low Worsall, North Yorkshire, England
- Coordinates: 54.4850°N 1.3956°W
- Completed: Early 18th century

Technical details
- Floor count: 2 / 3
- Designations

Listed Building – Grade II*
- Official name: Worsall Hall
- Designated: 5 May 1952
- Reference no.: 1294600

Worsall Hall is a historic building in Low Worsall, a village in North Yorkshire, in England.

The house lies at the northern end of the village green. It was built in the early 18th century, and has since been extended. Notable residents included George Thomas Rudd. The building was Grade II* listed in 1952.

The house is built of pinkish-red brick, with a pantile roof, a stone ridge, and one coped gable with a kneeler. The main block has three storeys and two bays, there is a right wing with two taller storeys and one bay, and a left wing with two storeys and a gabled projection on the left return. In the right part is a canted bay window. Most of the windows are sashes in architraves, with gauged flat brick arches, and there are two casement windows. Inside, there is an early staircase and panelling, and a wall painting depicting Worsall Quay, which was built by an owner of the house but demolished in the late 19th century.

== See also ==
- Grade II* listed buildings in North Yorkshire (district)
- Listed buildings in Low Worsall
