= Nassington =

Village in Northamptonshire, England

Coordinates: 52.5559°N 0.4306°W

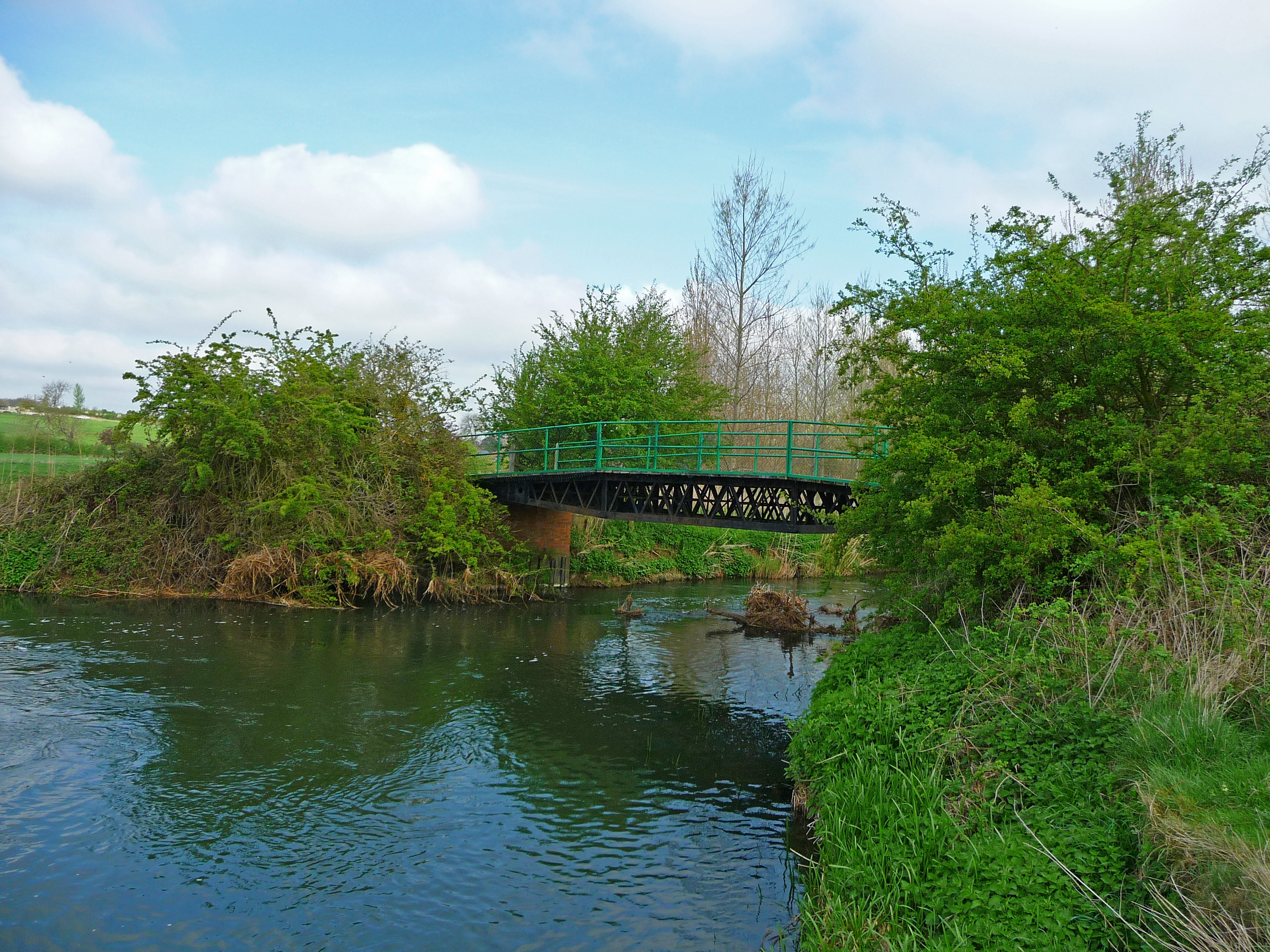
- River Nene near Nassington

- Location within Northamptonshire
- Population: 827 (2011 Census)
- OS grid reference: TL0696
- Civil parish: Nassington
- Unitary authority: North Northamptonshire
- Ceremonial county: Northamptonshire
- Region: East Midlands
- Country: England
- Sovereign state: United Kingdom
- Post town: PETERBOROUGH
- Postcode district: PE8
- Dialling code: 01780
- Police: Northamptonshire
- Fire: Northamptonshire
- Ambulance: East Midlands
- UK Parliament: Corby and East Northamptonshire

Nassington is a village and civil parish in North Northamptonshire, England. The village is on the River Nene and the border with Cambridgeshire, around 8 miles (13 km) west of Peterborough. At the 2021 census, the population of the parish was 867, an increase from 827 at the 2011 Census, and 670 at the 2001 census.

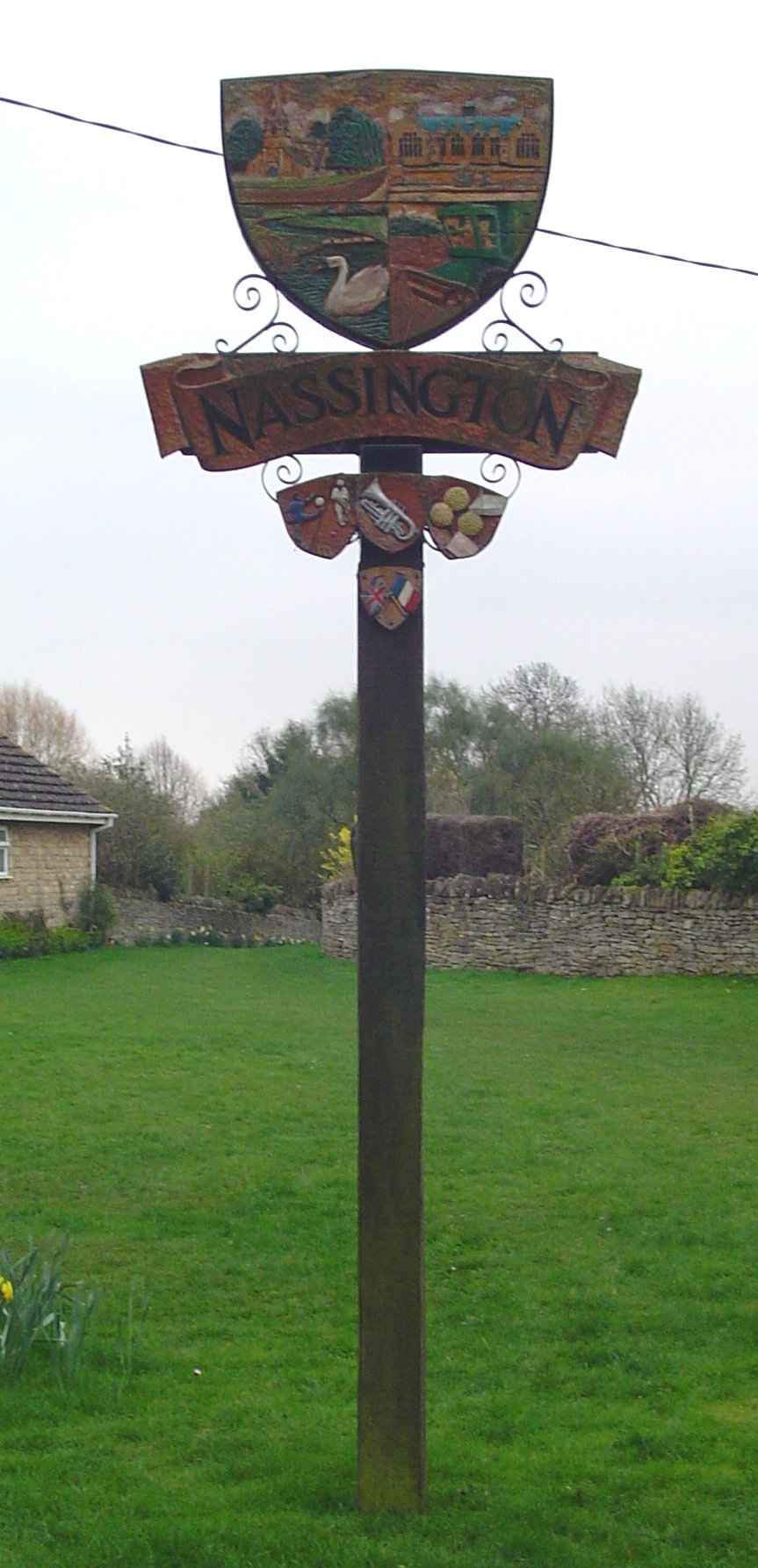
Signpost in Nassington

The village's name means 'Promontory place farm/settlement'.

The village has existed since at least Anglo-Saxon times, for an Anglo-Saxon hall was taken over by the Viking king, Cnut the Great, as one of his royal halls. Cnut is known to have visited after 1017, with his court including Aethelric the bishop of Dorchester on Thames. In 1107 Henry I gave the hall and land to the Bishop of Lincoln, Robert Bloet, to endow a prebend.

The village and manor were featured in episode 117, King Cnut's Manor of Time Team (aired 7 March 2004).

The manor is now a private home, but the Prebendal Manor and Tithe Barn Museum, and gardens, are open to the paying public on some days. The gardens only contain plants introduced prior to 1485.

Nassington Homestead is the site of farming buildings dating to approximately 140AD and a site of ongoing annual excavations.

Nassington History Group weeks weekly in the village hall and hosts a repository of information online.

More inform

== See also ==
- Nassington railway station
- William of Nassyngton
