= High Worsall =

Hamlet and civil parish in North Yorkshire, England

Coordinates: 54.478170°N 1.403190°W

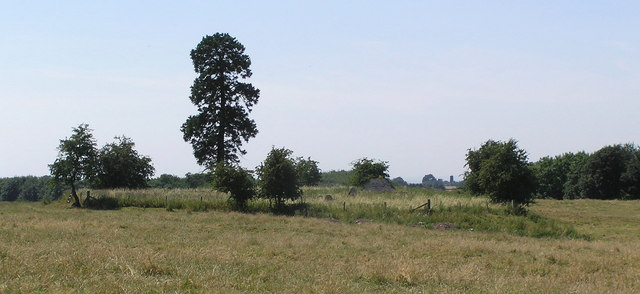
- Site of the deserted village

- Location within North Yorkshire
- OS grid reference: NZ387093
- Civil parish: High Worsall
- Unitary authority: North Yorkshire
- Ceremonial county: North Yorkshire
- Region: Yorkshire and the Humber
- Country: England
- Sovereign state: United Kingdom
- Post town: YARM
- Postcode district: TS15
- Police: North Yorkshire
- Fire: North Yorkshire
- Ambulance: Yorkshire

High Worsall is a hamlet and civil parish in North Yorkshire, England. It is near Low Worsall and 4 miles (6.4 km) west of Yarm. The population of the parish was estimated at 40 in 2010. The population remained at less than 100 at the 2011 Census, so details were included in the civil parish of Low Worsall. However, in 2015, North Yorkshire County Council estimated the hamlet to have 40 people living there in 2015.

Both High and Low Worsall are mentioned in the Domesday Book, and the first element derives from an Old English personal name (Wyrc) and the location of the villages in the nook of land of the River Tees provides the second element of the name. The area contains evidence of a deserted medieval village, featured on Time Team in the late 1990s.

From 1974 to 2023 it was part of the Hambleton District, it is now administered by the unitary North Yorkshire Council.

A chapel dedicated to St John was built in the village c. 1710, which was used up until 1894, when a church was built in Low Worsall. The churchyard was still the location of burials until at least 1957.

High Worsall was the highest tidal point on the River Tees until the opening of the Tees Barrage in 1995.

== See also ==
- Listed buildings in High Worsall
