= The Old Furnace =

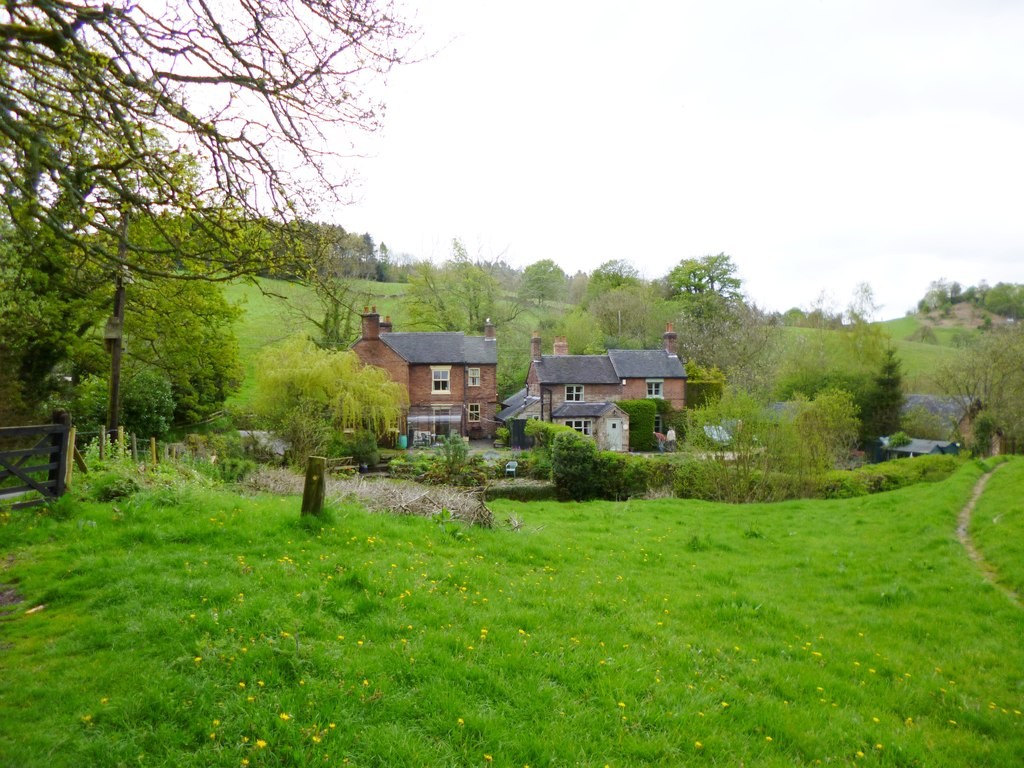
- Old Furnace Cottage (left), looking northeast from beside Chapel Lane

- Location within Staffordshire
- Interactive map of the The Old Furnace area

General information
- Location: Greendale, Oakamoor, Staffordshire, England
- Coordinates: 52.989252°N 1.939729°W

The Old Furnace is a colloquial name given to an historic site in Oakamoor, Staffordshire, England, that supported the development of medieval and post-medieval iron smelting.

The furnace was situated in the Churnet Valley in the Staffordshire moorlands. A later Elizabethan-era blast furnace once stood on the site of the present Old Furnace Cottage. That furnace, the first in the north of England, was constructed in 1592 by Lawrence Loggin. The stone was brought three miles from Hollington by mule down an ancient trackway. This path can still be seen in the field next to the cottage. Problems arose from the outset, and after nine months the site was abandoned, which gave way to its old furnace name.

An archaeological evaluation undertaken in 2004, in unison with an episode of the British archaeology television programme Time Team, revealed that iron smelting using the bloomery process, with associated pottery of the 13th and 14th century dates, was well established on the site in the medieval period. An "unstratified sherd of late Saxon pottery" hinted that iron working on the site may date back to the 10th or 11th centuries.

George Talbot, 6th Earl of Shrewsbury, whose seat was two miles away, owned rights to many mineral-extraction sites in the area. His business affairs passed to his wife, Bess of Hardwick, upon his death in 1590.

The firm of Thomas Bolton, a copper extruder, had a works at Oakamoor. In 1869 he built the home now known as Old Furnace Cottage for his workers.

== Gallery ==
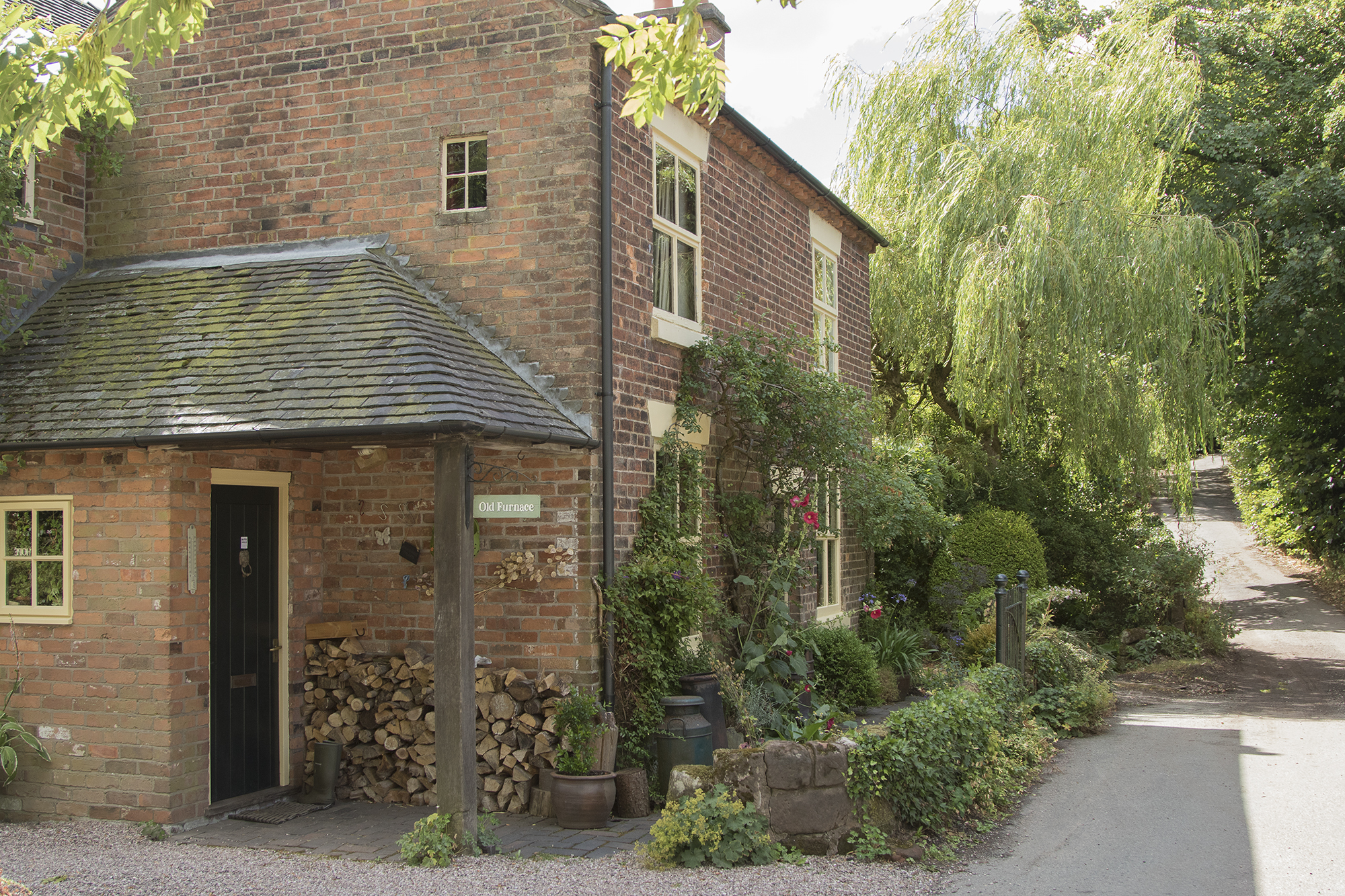
Old Furnace Cottage in 2018
