= Slum =

Highly populated urban residential area consisting mostly of decrepit housing units

Slums in various countries
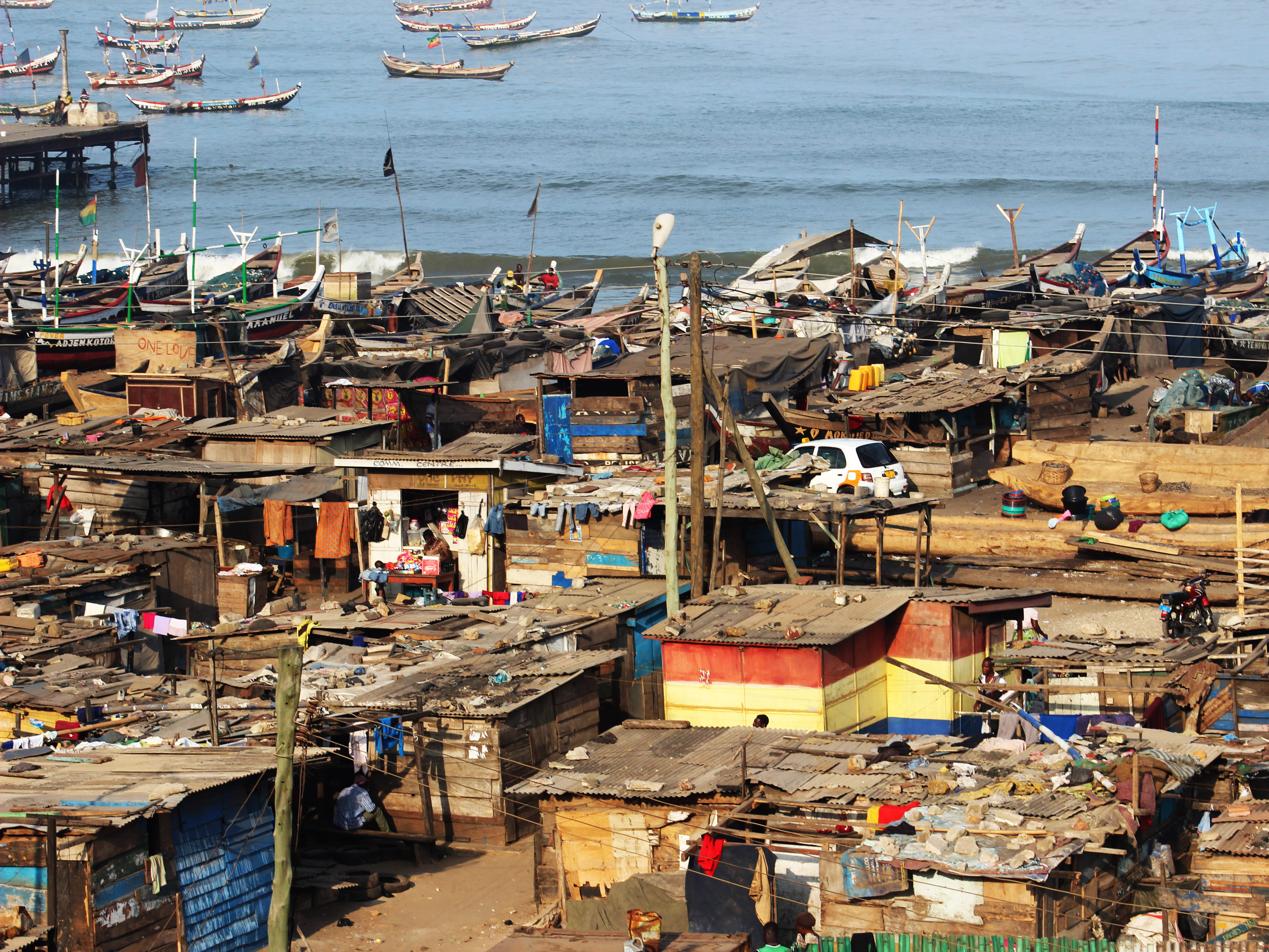
Accra, Ghana

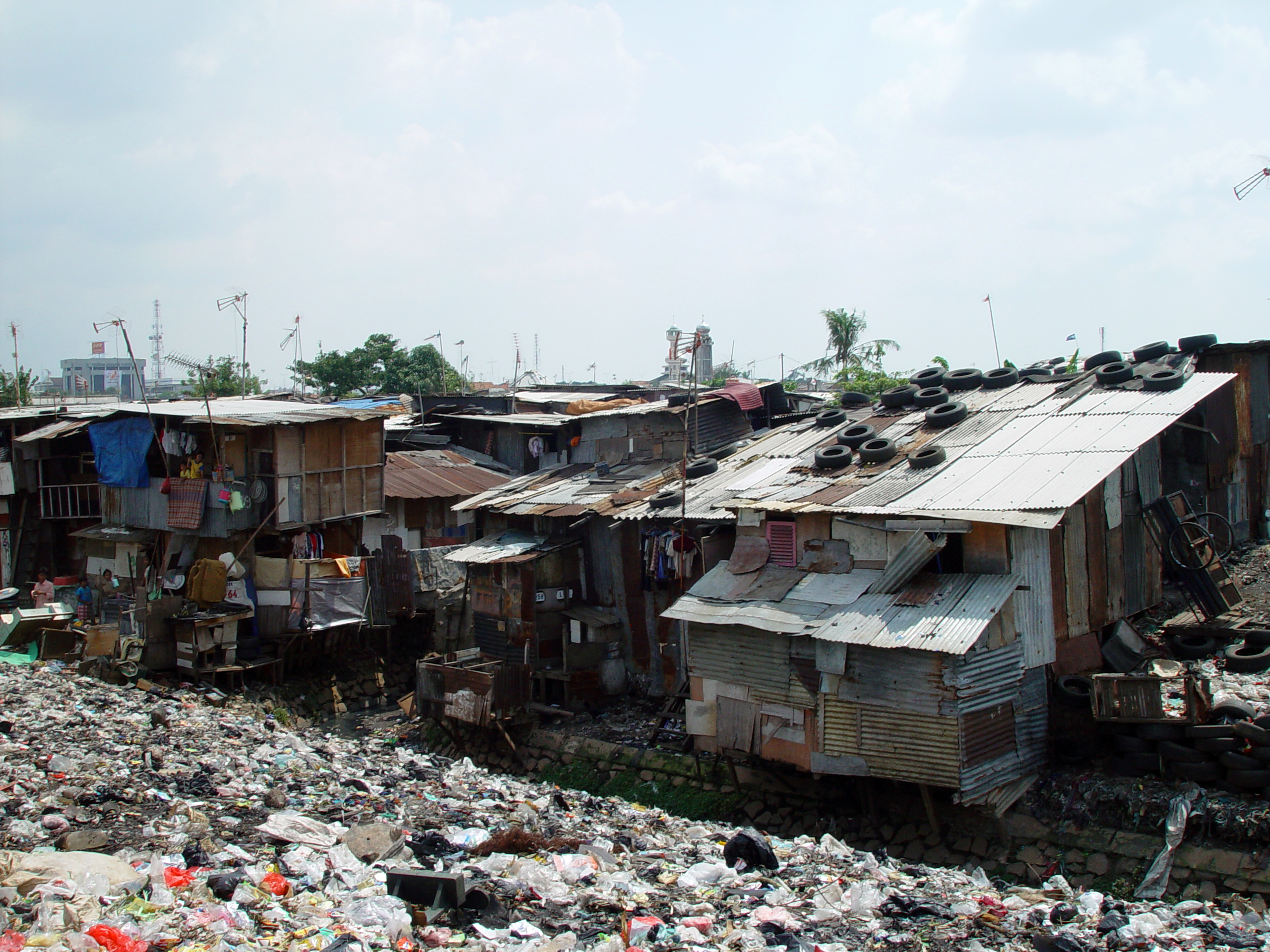
Jakarta, Indonesia

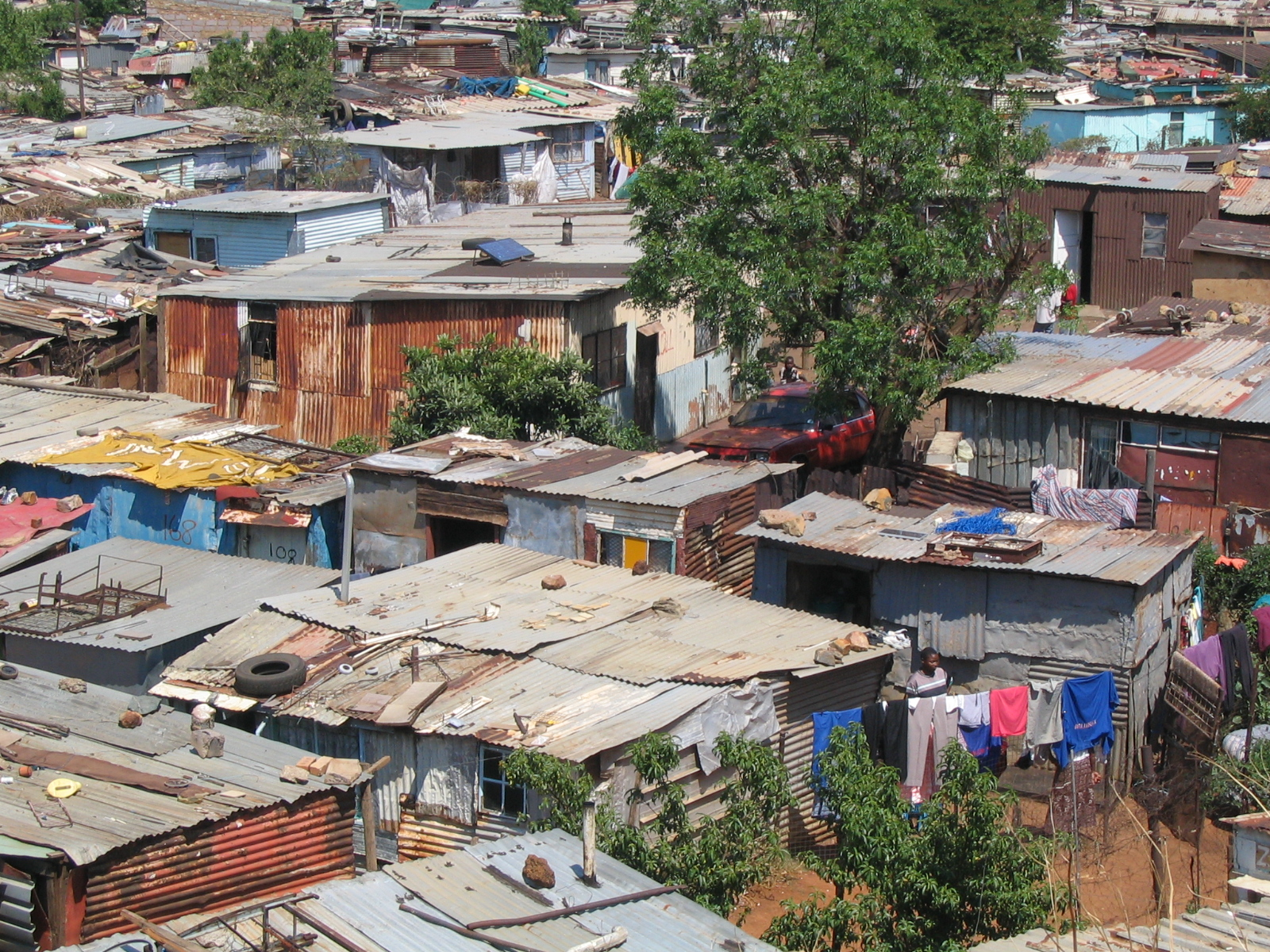
Johannesburg, South Africa

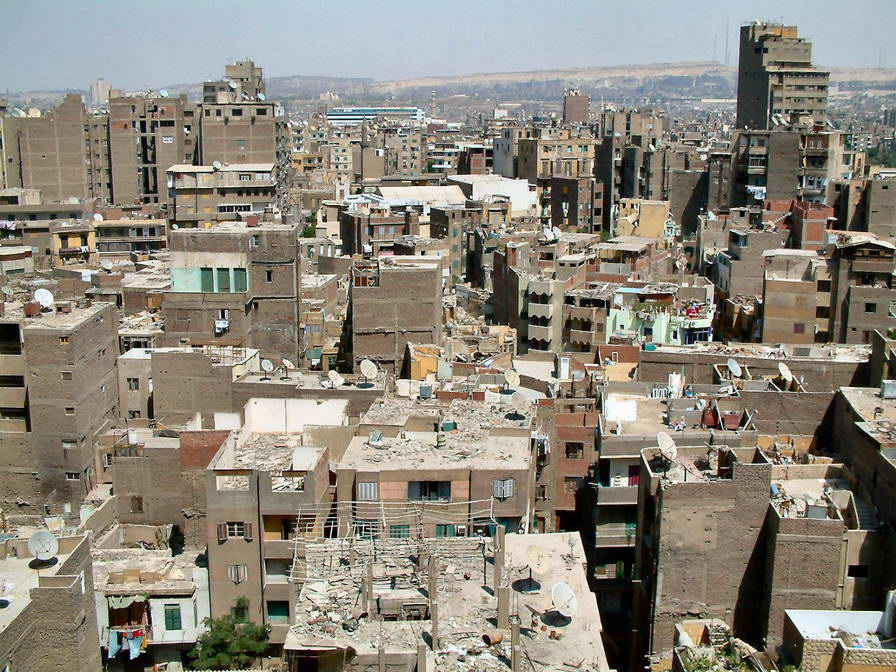
Cairo, Egypt

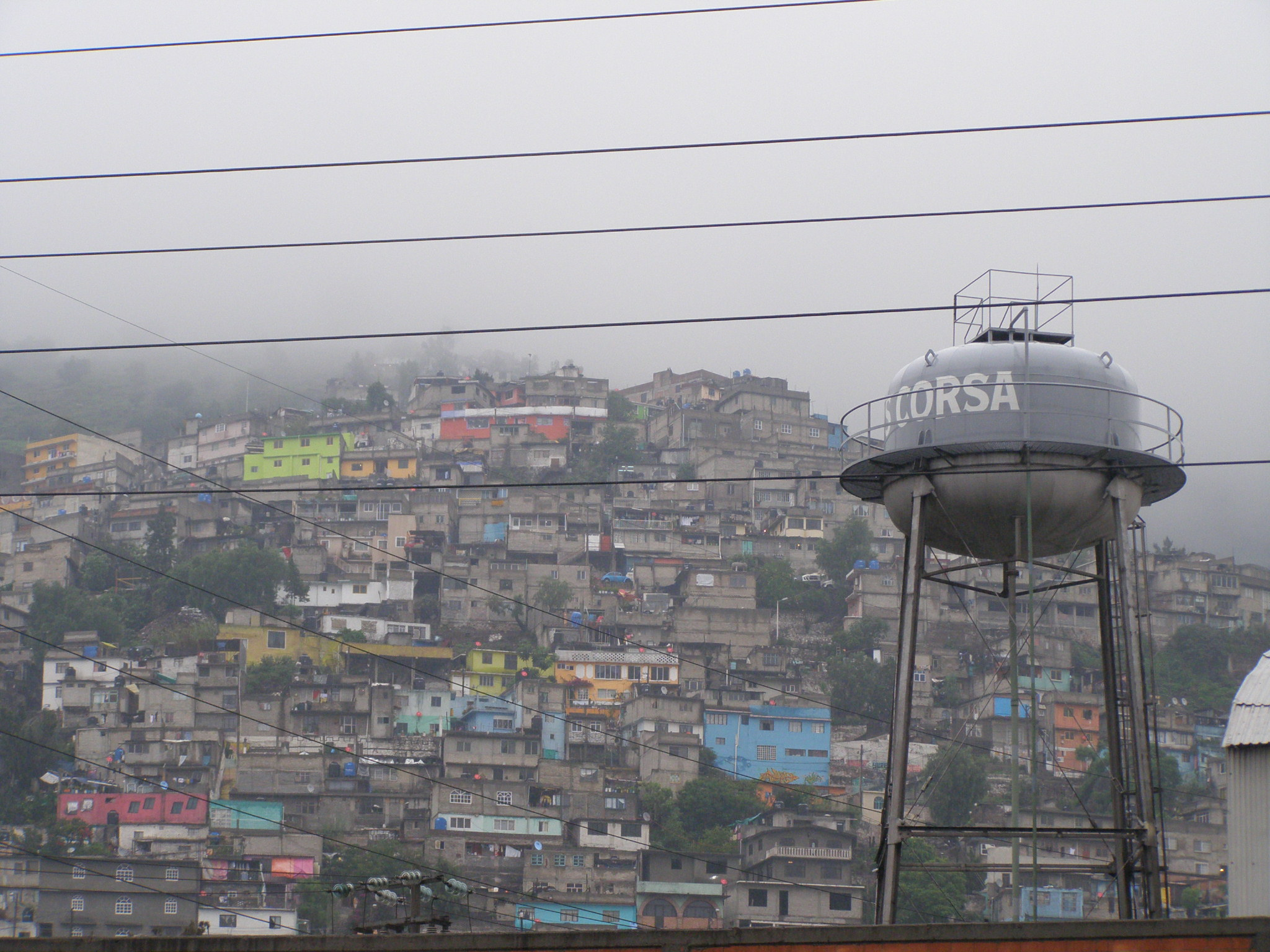
Tlalnepantla de Baz, Mexico

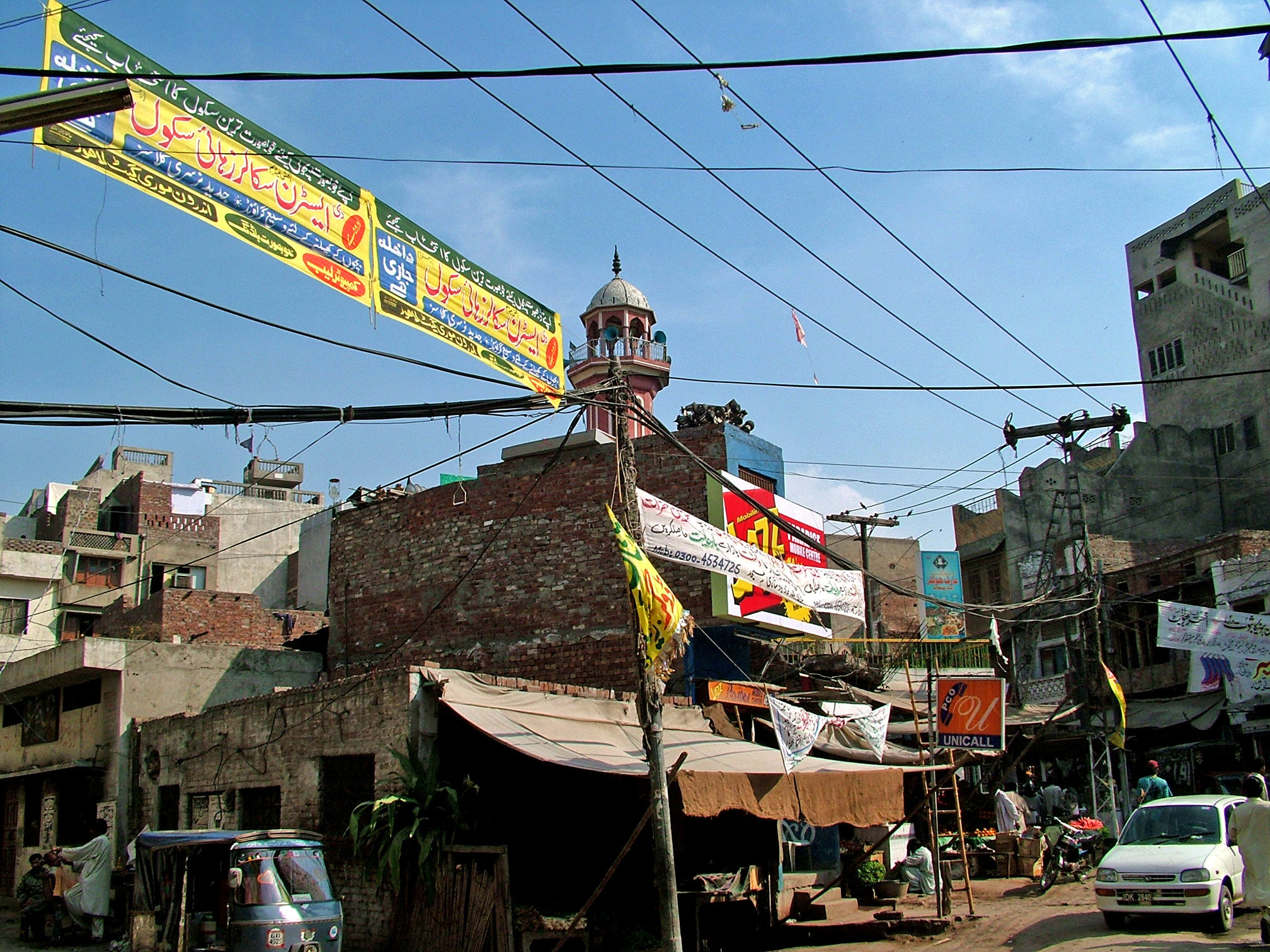
Lahore, Pakistan

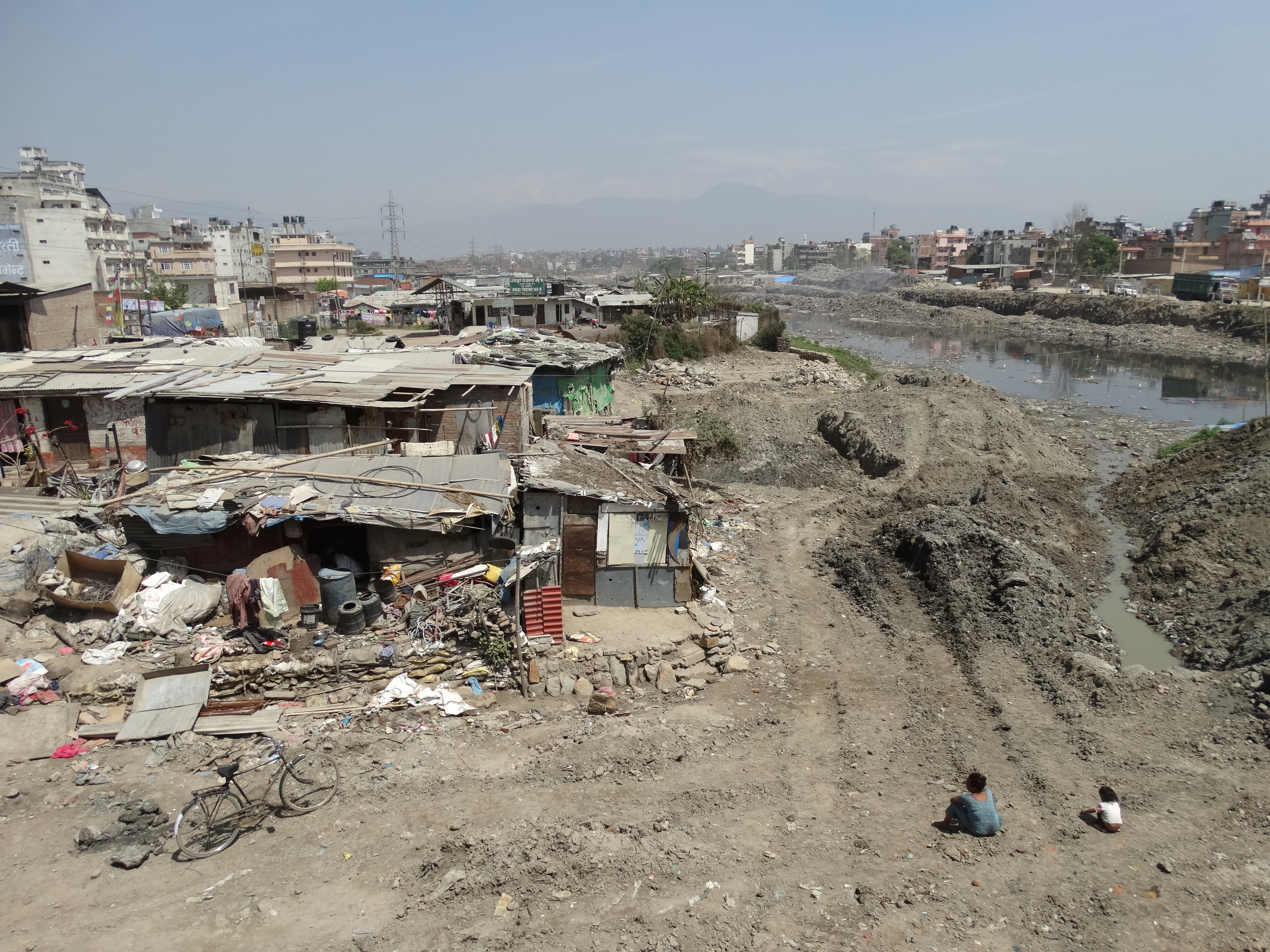
Kathmandu, Nepal

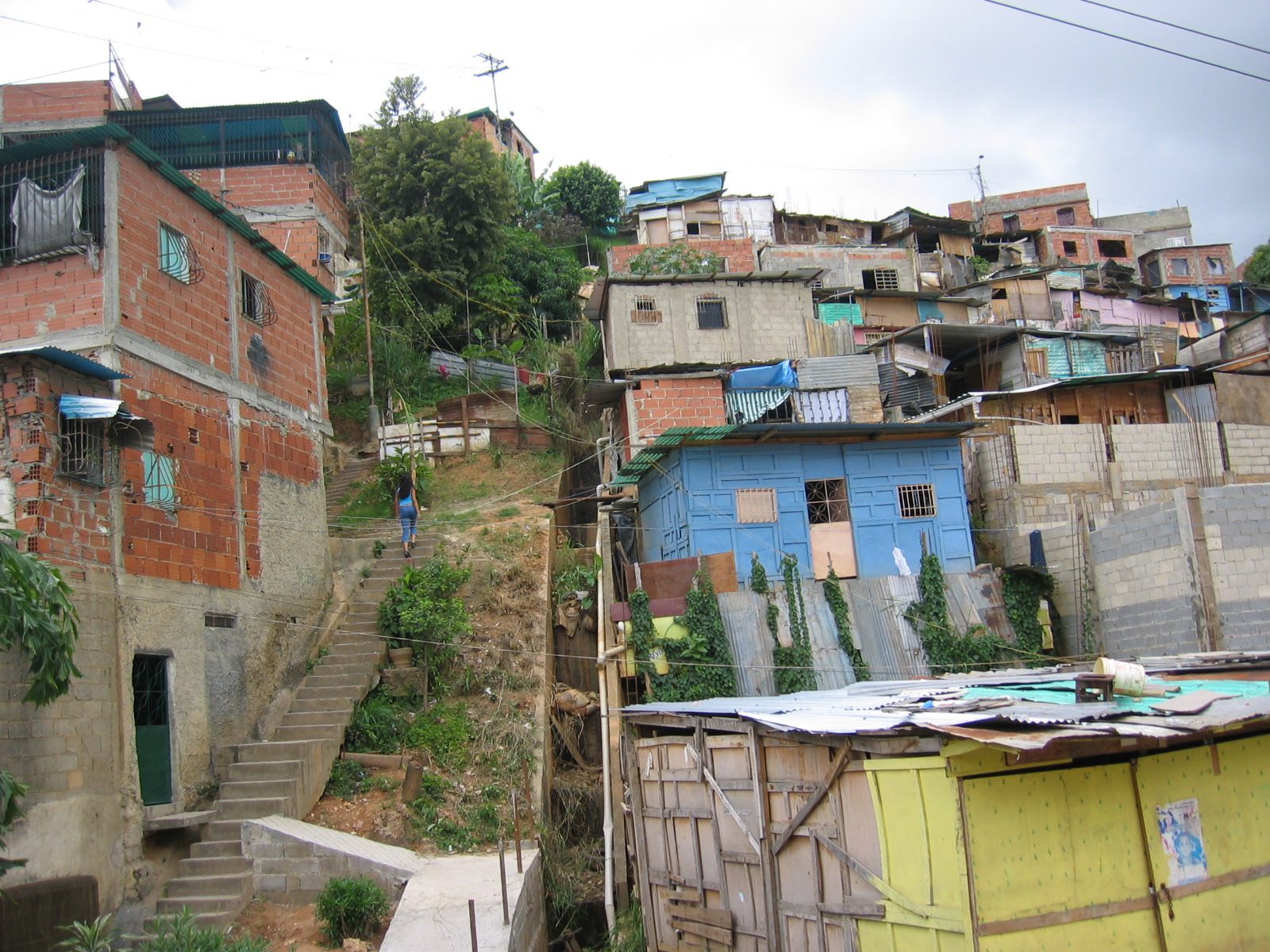
Caracas, Venezuela

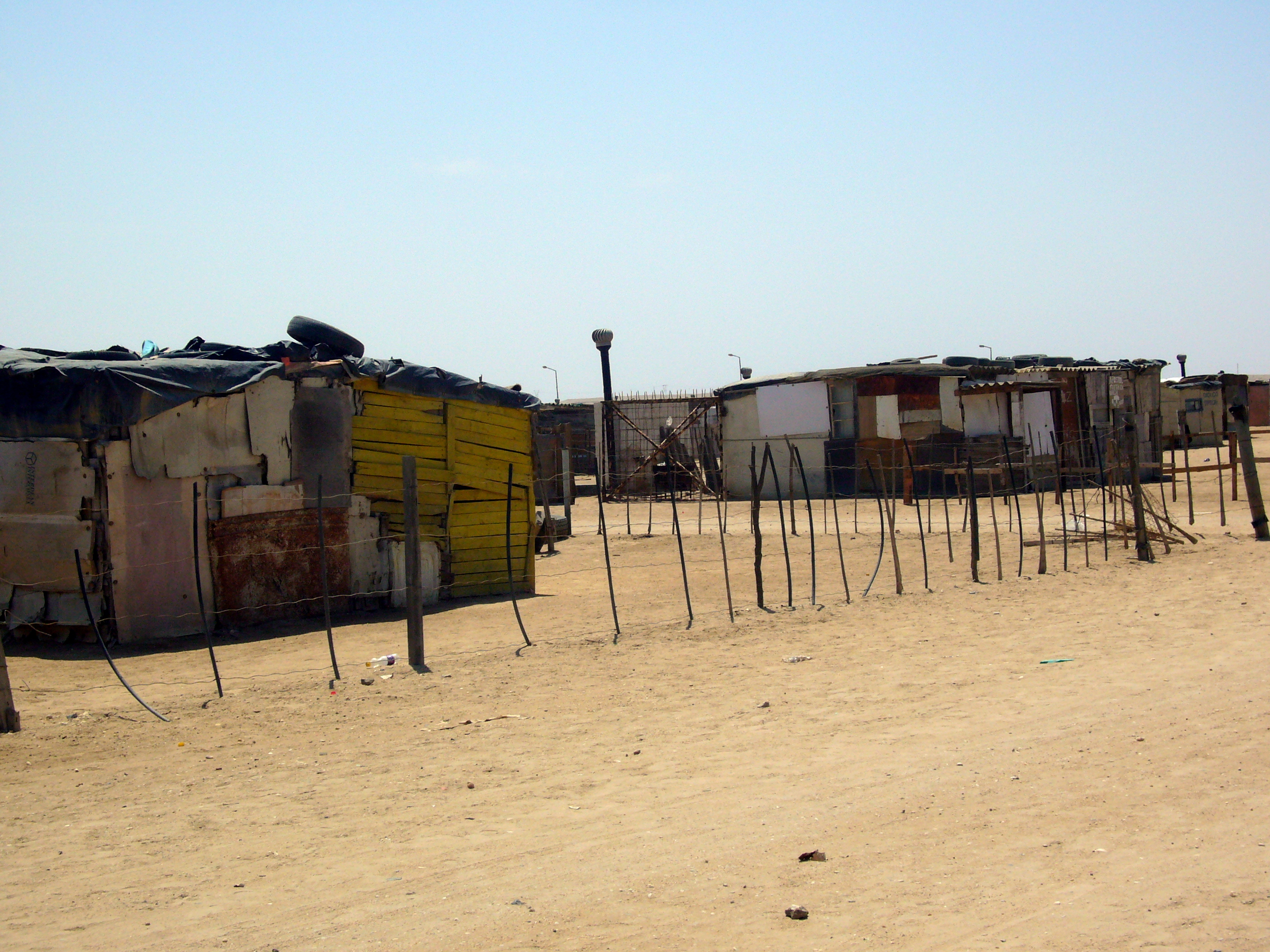
Swakopmund, Namibia

A slum is a highly populated urban residential area consisting of densely packed housing units of weak build quality and often associated with poverty. The infrastructure in slums is often deteriorated or incomplete, and they are primarily inhabited by impoverished people.

Although slums are usually located in urban areas, they can be located in suburban areas where housing quality is low and living conditions are poor. Slum residences vary from shanty houses to professionally built dwellings which, because of poor-quality construction or lack of basic maintenance, have deteriorated. While slums differ in size and other characteristics, most lack reliable sanitation services, supply of clean water, reliable electricity, law enforcement, and other basic services. The United Nations defines slums as ".... informal settlements lacking one or more of the following conditions: access to improved water, access to improved sanitation, sufficient living area, housing durability, and security of tenure."

Due to increasing urbanization of the general populace, slums became common in the 19th to late 20th centuries in the United States and Europe. Slums are still predominantly found in urban regions of developing countries, but are also still found in developed economies. The world's largest slum city is found in Orangi in Karachi, Pakistan.

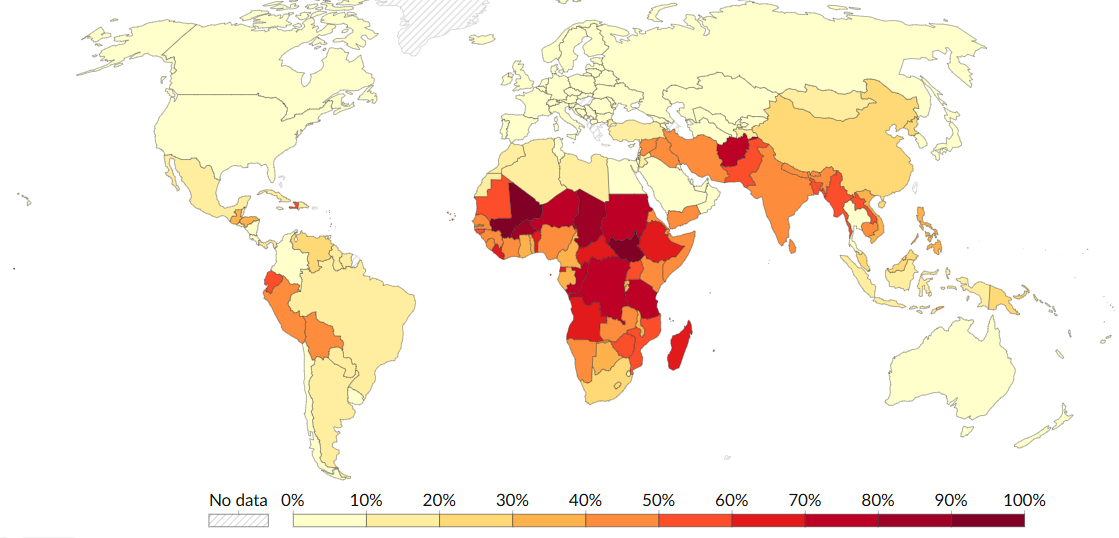
Share of urban population living in slums (2022)

Slums form and grow in different parts of the world for many different reasons. Causes include rapid rural-to-urban migration, economic stagnation and depression, high unemployment, poverty, informal economy, forced or manipulated ghettoization, poor planning, politics, natural disasters, and social conflicts. Strategies tried to reduce and transform slums in different countries, with varying degrees of success, include a combination of slum removal, slum relocation, slum upgrading, urban planning with citywide infrastructure development, and public housing.

== Etymology and nomenclature ==
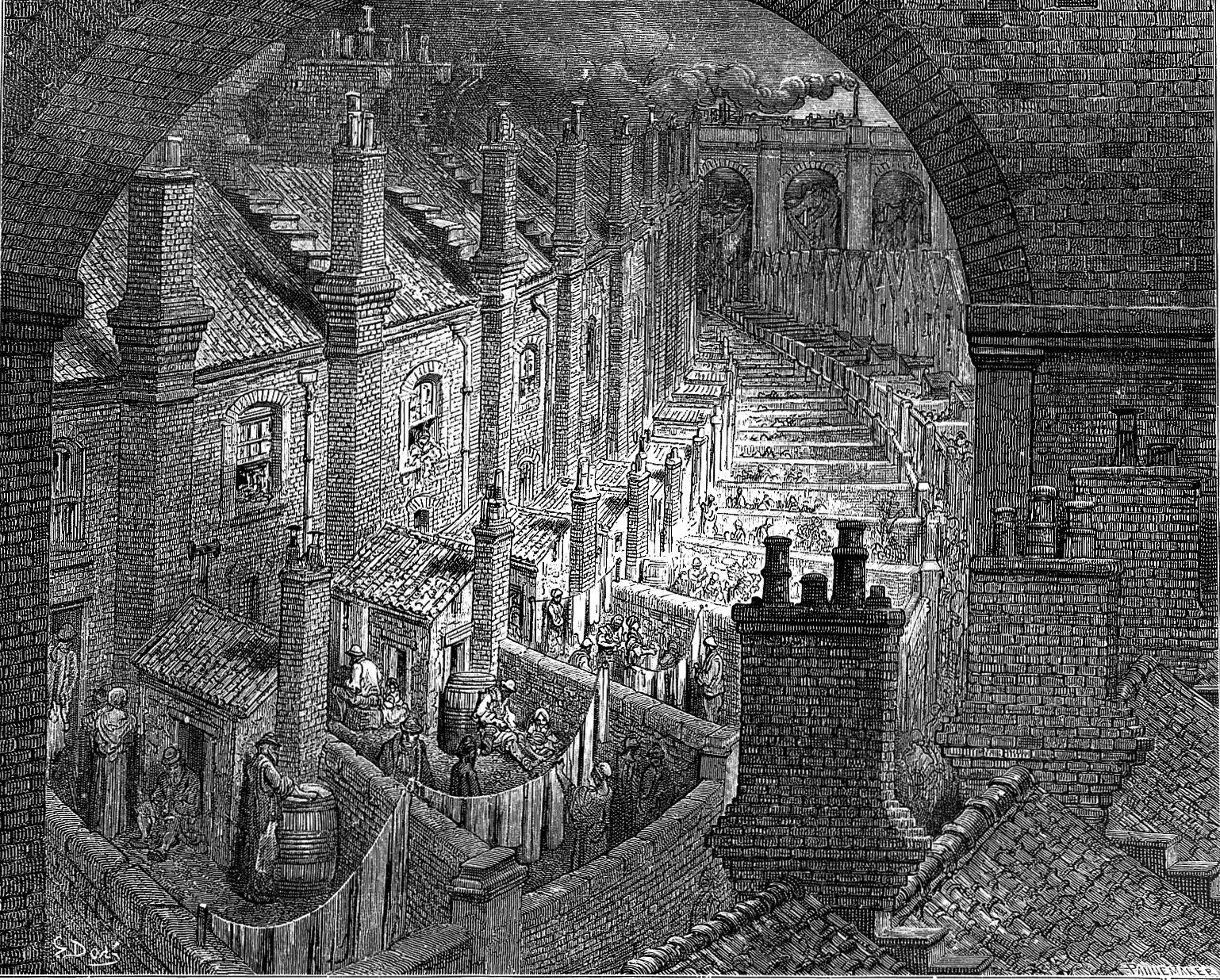
Nineteenth century slum, London. Gustave Dore

It is thought that slum is a British slang word from the East End of London meaning "room", which evolved to "back slum" around 1845 meaning 'back alley, street of poor people.'

Numerous other terms, some borrowed from or used in other languages, are or have been used more or less interchangeably with slum: shanty town, favela, rookery, gecekondu, skid row, barrio, ghetto, banlieue, bidonville, taudis, bandas de miseria, barrio marginal, morro, paragkoupoli, loteamento, barraca, musseque, iskuwater, inner city, tugurio, solares, mudun safi, kawasan kumuh, karyan, medina achouaia, brarek, ishash, galoos, tanake, baladi, trushchoby, chalis, katras, zopadpattis, ftohogeitonia, basti, estero, looban, dagatan, umjondolo, watta, udukku, and chereka bete. Nonetheless, many of these words have their own distinct meaning.

The word slum has negative connotations, and using this label for an area can be seen as an attempt to delegitimize that land use when hoping to repurpose it.

== History ==
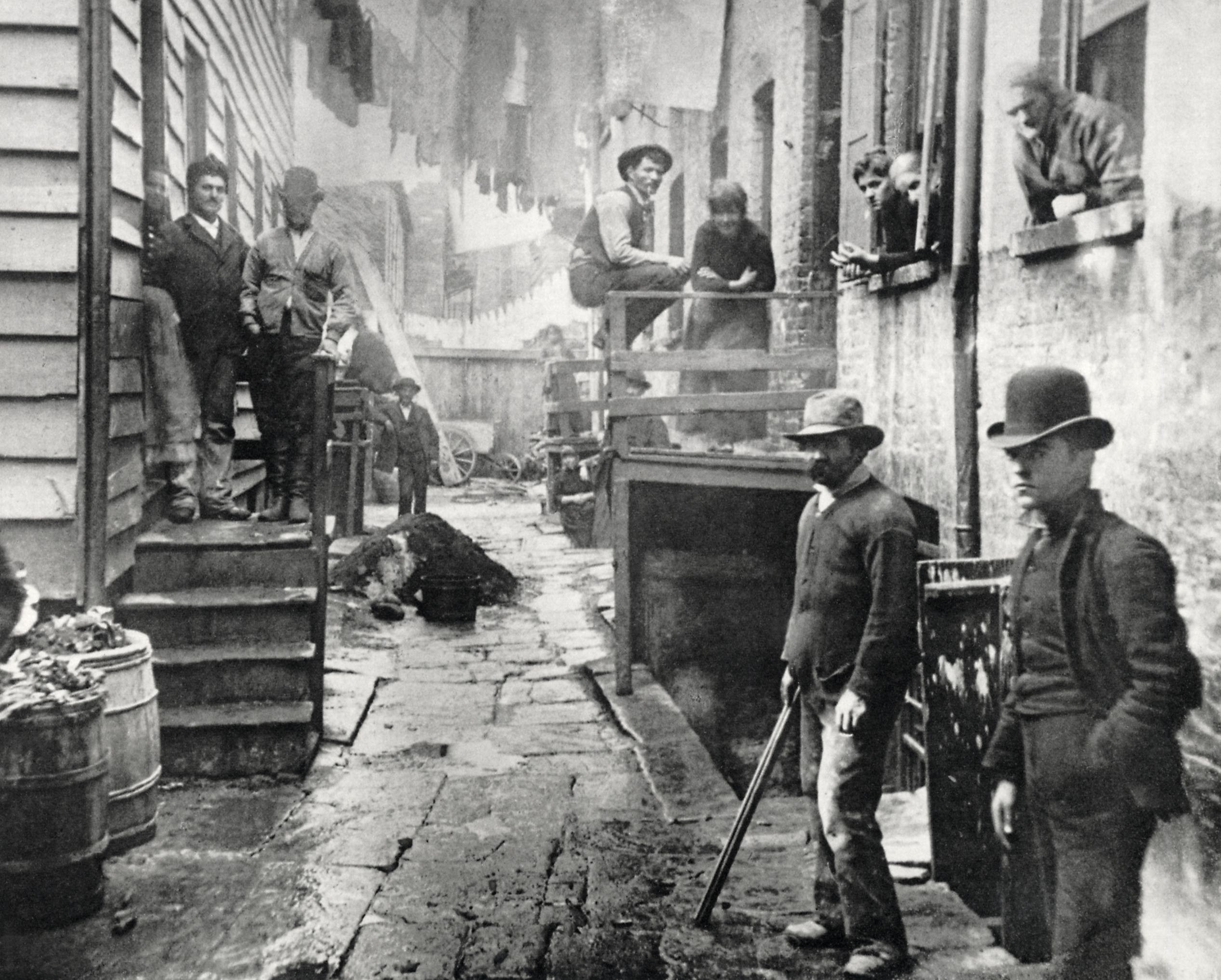
One of the many New York City slum photographs of Jacob Riis (c. 1890). Filth can be seen on the street, with drying laundry hanging between buildings.

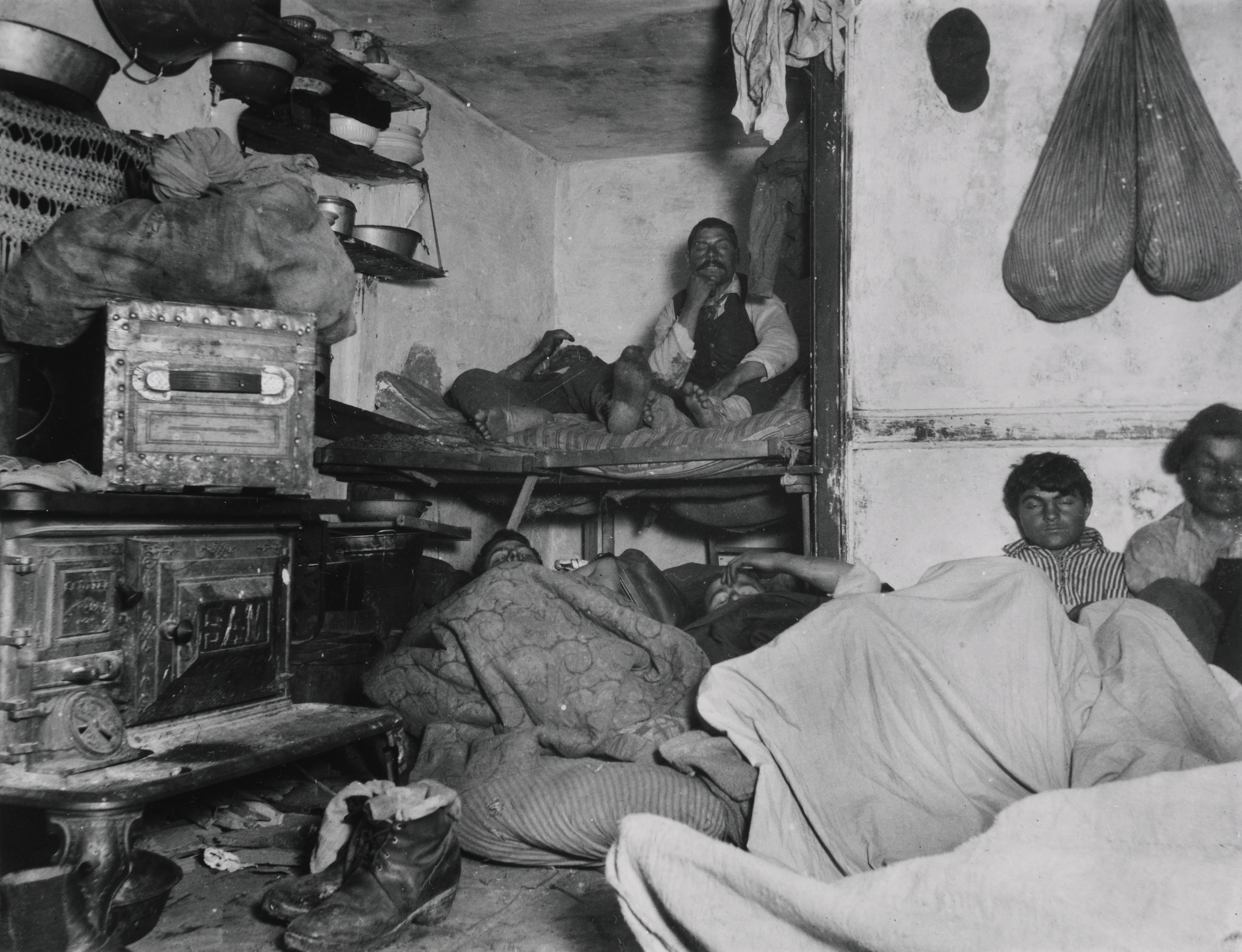
Inside of a slum house, from Jacob Riis photo collection of New York City (ca 1890).

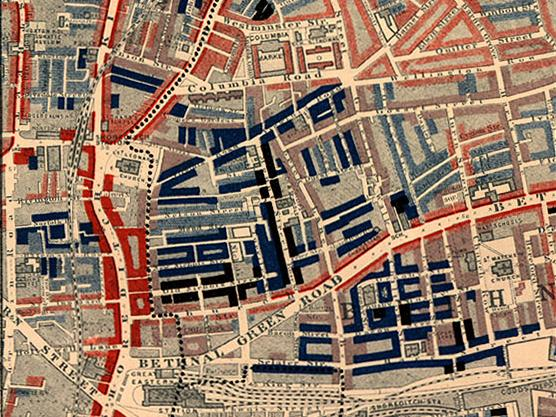
Part of Charles Booth's poverty map showing the Old Nichol, a slum in the East End of London. Published 1889 in Life and Labour of the People in London. The red areas are "middle class, well-to-do", light blue areas are "poor, 18s to 21s a week for a moderate family", dark blue areas are "very poor, casual, chronic want", and black areas are the "lowest class...occasional labourers, street sellers, loafers, criminals and semi-criminals".

Before the 19th century, rich and poor people lived in the same districts, with the wealthy living on the high streets, and the poor in the service streets behind them. But in the 19th century, wealthy and upper-middle-class people began to move out of the central parts of rapidly growing cities, leaving poorer residents behind.

Slums were common in the United States and Europe before the early 20th century. London's East End is generally considered the locale where the term originated in the 19th century, where massive and rapid urbanization of the dockside and industrial areas led to intensive overcrowding in a warren of post-medieval streetscape. The suffering of the poor was described in popular fiction by moralist authors such as Charles Dickens – most famously Oliver Twist (1837–1839) and echoed the Christian Socialist values of the time, which soon found legal expression in the Public Health Act 1848. As the slum clearance movement gathered pace, deprived areas such as Old Nichol were fictionalised to raise awareness in the middle classes in the form of moralist novels such as A Child of the Jago (1896) resulting in slum clearance and reconstruction programmes such as the Boundary Estate (1893-1900) and the creation of charitable trusts such as the Peabody Trust founded in 1862 and Joseph Rowntree Foundation (1904) which still operate to provide decent housing today.

Slums are often associated with the British Isles during the Victorian era, particularly in industrial towns. Friedrich Engels described these neighborhoods as "cattle-sheds for human beings". These were generally still inhabited until the 1940s, when the British government started slum clearance and built new council houses. There are still examples left of slum housing in the UK, but many have been removed by government initiative, redesigned and replaced with better public housing. In Europe, slums were common. By the 1920s it had become a common slang expression in England, meaning either various taverns and eating houses, "loose talk" or gypsy language, or a room with "low going-ons". In Life in London (1821) Pierce Egan used the word in the context of the "back slums" of Holy Lane or St Giles. A footnote defined slum to mean "low, unfrequent parts of the town". Charles Dickens used the word slum in a similar way in 1840, writing "I mean to take a great, London, back-slum kind walk tonight". Slum began to be used to describe bad housing soon after and was used as alternative expression for rookeries. In 1850 the Catholic Cardinal Wiseman described the area known as Devil's Acre in Westminster, London as follows:

Close under the Abbey of Westminster there lie concealed labyrinths of lanes and cottages and alleys and slums, nests of ignorance, vice, depravity, and crime, as well as of squalor, wretchedness, and disease; whose atmosphere is typhus, whose ventilation is cholera; in which swarms a huge and almost countless population, nominally at least, Catholic; haunts of filth, which no sewage committee can reach – dark corners, which no lighting board can brighten.

This passage was widely quoted in the national press, leading to the popularization of the word slum to describe bad housing.

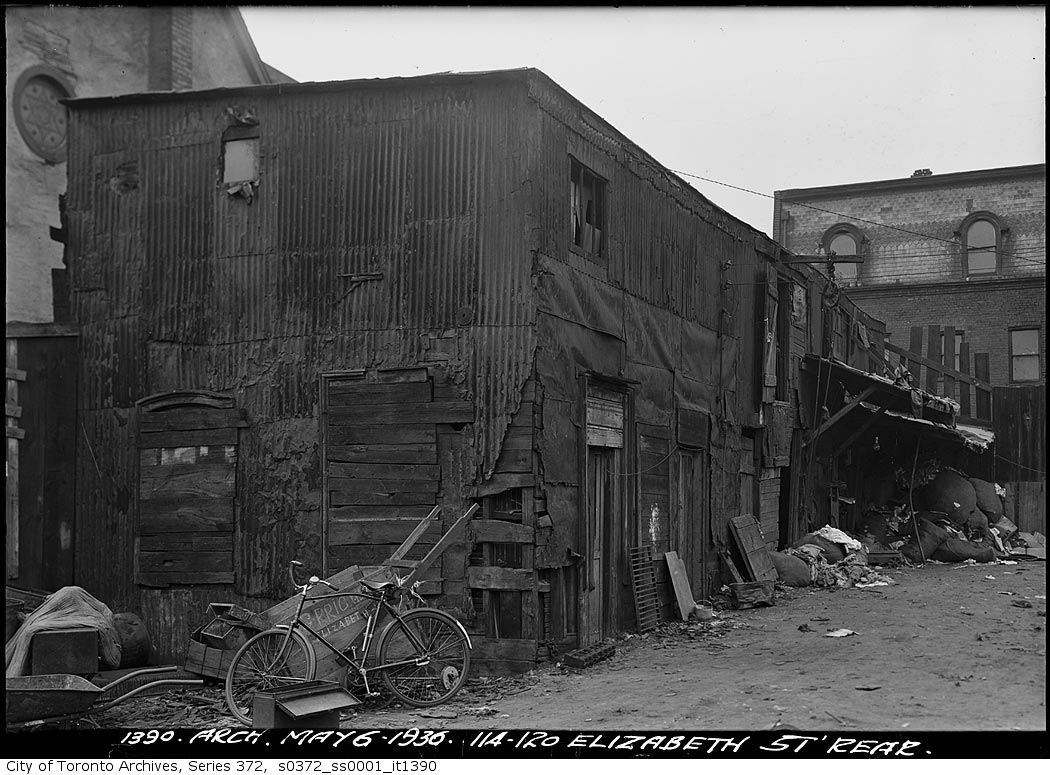
A slum dwelling in Toronto, Ontario, Canada, about 1936.

In France as in most industrialised European capitals, slums were widespread in Paris and other urban areas in the 19th century, many of which continued through first half of the 20th century. The first cholera epidemic of 1832 triggered a political debate, and Louis René Villermé study of various arrondissements of Paris demonstrated the differences and connection between slums, poverty and poor health. Melun Law first passed in 1849 and revised in 1851, followed by establishment of Paris Commission on Unhealthful Dwellings in 1852 began the social process of identifying the worst housing inside slums, but did not remove or replace slums.

After World War II, French people started mass migration from rural to urban areas of France. This demographic and economic trend rapidly raised rents of existing housing as well as expanded slums. French government passed laws to block increase in the rent of housing, which inadvertently made many housing projects unprofitable and increased slums. In 1950, France launched its Habitation à Loyer Modéré initiative to finance and build public housing and remove slums, managed by techniciens – urban technocrats., and financed by Livret A – a tax free savings account for French public. Some slums remain in the early 21st century in France, most of which are dismantled after a few months, the largest being the "Petite Ceinture" slum on the northern Paris decommissioned train tracks.

New York City is believed to have created the United States' first slum, named the Five Points in 1825, as it evolved into a large urban settlement. Five Points was named for a lake named Collect, which, by the late 1700s, was surrounded by slaughterhouses and tanneries which emptied their waste directly into its waters. Trash piled up as well and by the early 1800s the lake was filled up and dry. On this foundation was built Five Points, the United States' first slum. Five Points was occupied by successive waves of freed slaves, Irish, then Italian, then Chinese, immigrants. It housed the poor, rural people leaving farms for opportunity, and the persecuted people from Europe pouring into New York City. Bars, bordellos, squalid and lightless tenements lined its streets. Violence and crime were commonplace. Politicians and social elite discussed it with derision. Slums like Five Points triggered discussions of affordable housing and slum removal. As of the start of the 21st century, Five Points slum had been transformed into the Little Italy and Chinatown neighborhoods of New York City, through that city's campaign of massive urban renewal.

Five Points was not the only slum in America. Jacob Riis, Walker Evans, Lewis Hine and others photographed many before World War II. Slums were found in every major urban region of the United States throughout most of the 20th century, long after the Great Depression. Most of these slums had been ignored by the cities and states which encompassed them until the 1960s' War on Poverty was undertaken by U.S. president Lyndon Johnson and the Federal government of the United States.

A type of slum housing, sometimes called poorhouses, crowded Boston Common, later at the fringes of the city.

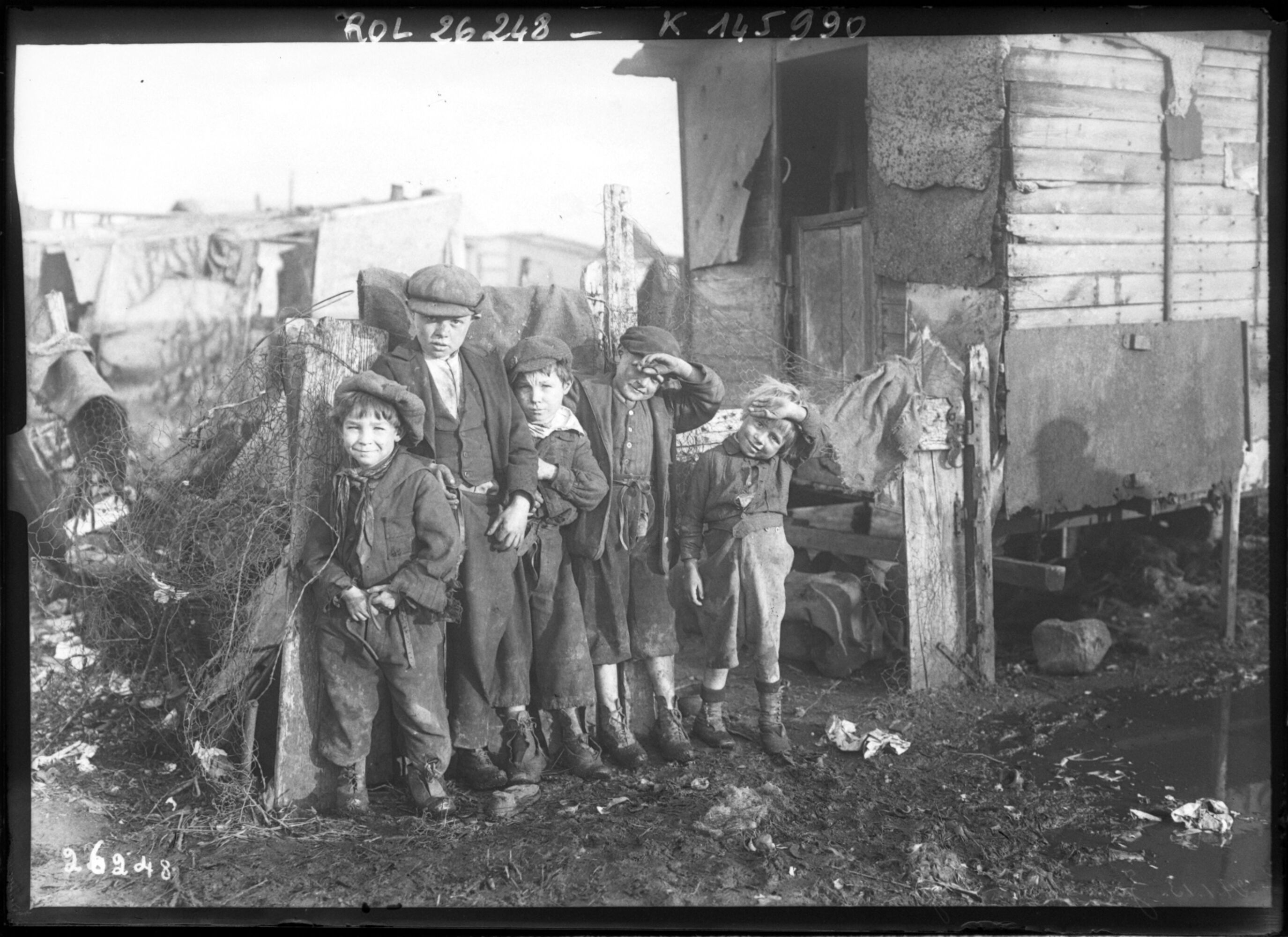
A 1913 slum dwelling midst squalor in Ivry-sur-Seine, a French commune about 5 kilometers (3.1 miles) from the center of Paris. Slums were scattered around Paris through the 1950s. After Loi Vivien was passed in July 1970, France demolished some of its last major bidonvilles (slums) and resettled resident Algerian, Portuguese and other migrant workers by the mid-1970s.

Rio de Janeiro documented its first slum in 1920 census. By the 1960s, over 33% of population of Rio lived in slums, 45% of Mexico City and Ankara, 65% of Algiers, 35% of Caracas, 25% of Lima and Santiago, 15% of Singapore. By 1980, in various cities and towns of Latin America alone, there were about 25,000 slums.

== Causes that create and expand slums ==
Slums sprout and continue for a combination of demographic, social, economic, and political reasons. Common causes include rapid rural-to-urban migration, poor planning, economic stagnation and depression, poverty, high unemployment, informal economy, colonialism and segregation, politics, natural disasters and social conflicts.

=== Rural–urban migration ===
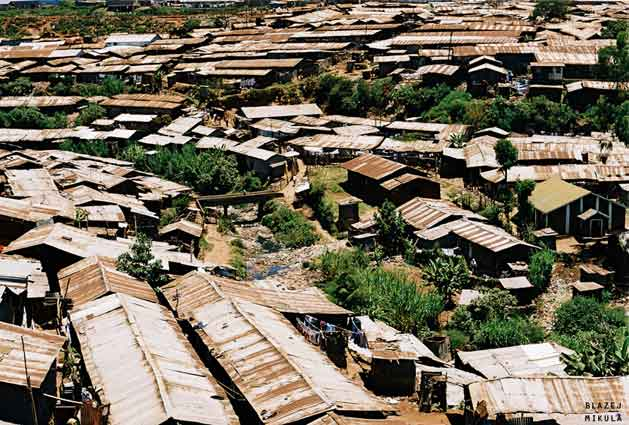
Kibera slum in Nairobi, Kenya, the second-largest slum in Africa and third-largest in the world.

Rural–urban migration is one of the causes attributed to the formation and expansion of slums. Since 1950, world population has increased at a far greater rate than the total amount of arable land, even as agriculture contributes a much smaller percentage of the total economy. For example, in India, agriculture accounted for 52% of its GDP in 1954 and only 19% in 2004; in Brazil, the 2050 GDP contribution of agriculture is one-fifth of its contribution in 1951. Agriculture, meanwhile, has also become higher yielding, less disease prone, less physically harsh and more efficient with tractors and other equipment. The proportion of people working in agriculture has declined by 30% over the last 50 years, while global population has increased by 250%.

Many people move to urban areas primarily because cities promise more jobs, better schools for poor's children, and diverse income opportunities than subsistence farming in rural areas. For example, in 1995, 95.8% of migrants to Surabaya, Indonesia reported that jobs were their primary motivation for moving to the city. However, some rural migrants may not find jobs immediately because of their lack of skills and the increasingly competitive job markets, which leads to their financial shortage. Many cities, on the other hand, do not provide enough low-cost housing for a large number of rural-urban migrant workers. Some rural–urban migrant workers cannot afford housing in cities and eventually settle down in only affordable slums. Further, rural migrants, mainly lured by higher incomes, continue to flood into cities. They thus expand the existing urban slums.

According to Ali and Toran, social networks might also explain rural–urban migration and people's ultimate settlement in slums. In addition to migration for jobs, a portion of people migrate to cities because of their connection with relatives or families. Once their family support in urban areas is in slums, those rural migrants intend to live with them in slums

=== Urbanization ===
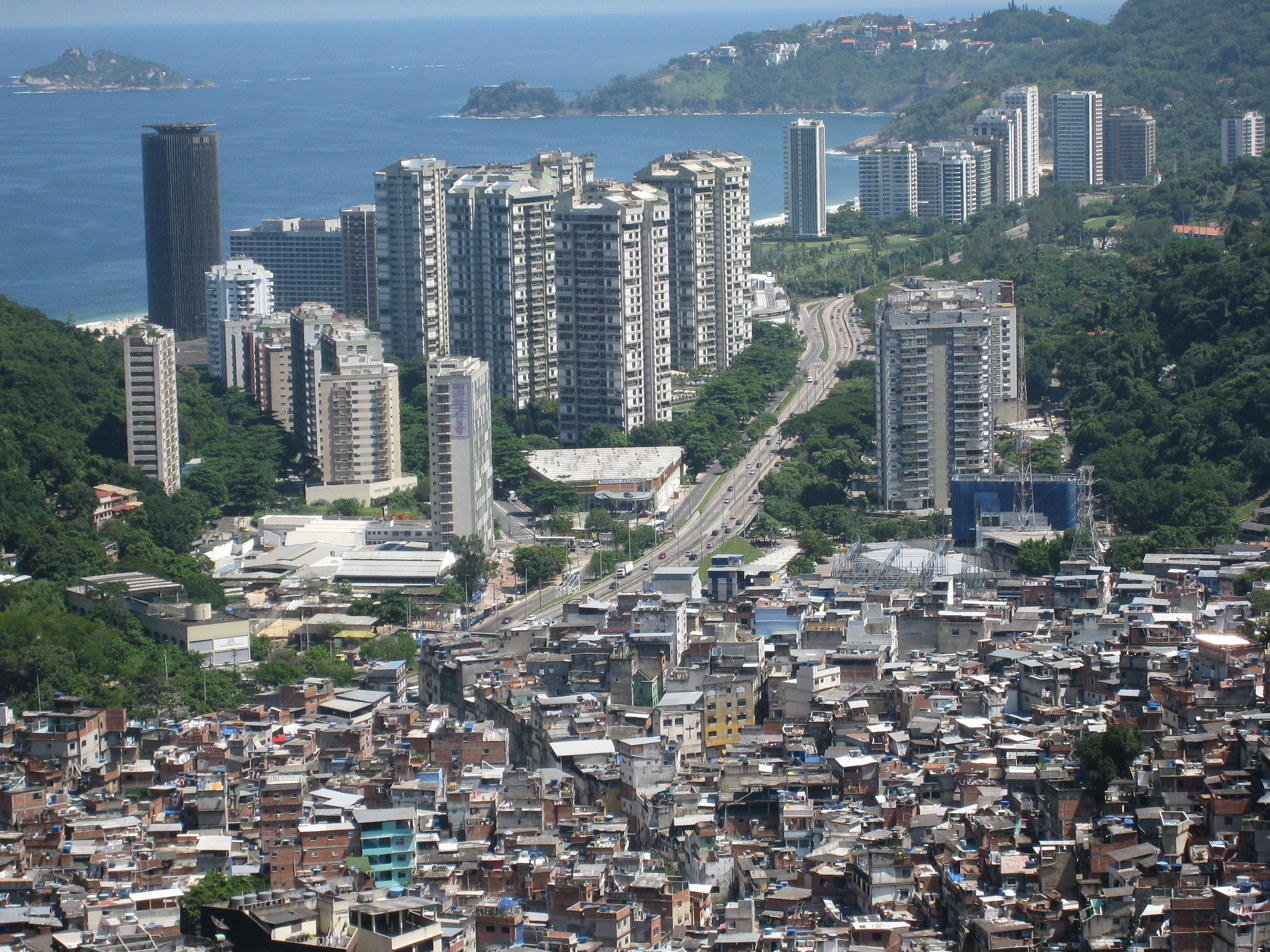
A slum in Rio de Janeiro, Brazil. Rocinha favela is next to skyscrapers and wealthier parts of the city, a location that provides jobs and easy commute to those who live in the slums.

The formation of slums is closely linked to urbanization. In 2008, more than 50% of the world's population lived in urban areas. In China, for example, it is estimated that the population living in urban areas will increase by 10% within a decade according to its current rates of urbanization. The UN-Habitat reports that 43% of urban population in developing countries and 78% of those in the least developed countries are slum dwellers.

Some scholars suggest that urbanization creates slums because local governments are unable to manage urbanization, and migrant workers without an affordable place to live in, dwell in slums. Rapid urbanization drives economic growth and causes people to seek working and investment opportunities in urban areas. However, as evidenced by poor urban infrastructure and insufficient housing, the local governments sometimes are unable to manage this transition. This incapacity can be attributed to insufficient funds and inexperience to handle and organize problems brought by migration and urbanization. In some cases, local governments ignore the flux of immigrants during the process of urbanization. Such examples can be found in many African countries. In the early 1950s, many African governments believed that slums would finally disappear with economic growth in urban areas. They neglected rapidly spreading slums due to increased rural-urban migration caused by urbanization. Some governments, moreover, mapped the land where slums occupied as undeveloped land.

Another type of urbanization does not involve economic growth but economic stagnation or low growth, mainly contributing to slum growth in Sub-Saharan Africa and parts of Asia. This type of urbanization involves a high rate of unemployment, insufficient financial resources and inconsistent urban planning policy. In these areas, an increase of 1% in urban population will result in an increase of 1.84% in slum prevalence.

Urbanization might also force some people to live in slums when it influences land use by transforming agricultural land into urban areas and increases land value. During the process of urbanization, some agricultural land is used for additional urban activities. More investment will come into these areas, which increases the land value. Before some land is completely urbanized, there is a period when the land can be used for neither urban activities nor agriculture. The income from the land will decline, which decreases the people's incomes in that area. The gap between people's low income and the high land price forces some people to look for and construct cheap informal settlements, which are known as slums in urban areas. The transformation of agricultural land also provides surplus labour, as peasants have to seek jobs in urban areas as rural-urban migrant workers.

Many slums are part of economies of agglomeration in which there is an emergence of economies of scale at the firm level, transport costs and the mobility of the industrial labour force. The increase in returns of scale will mean that the production of each good will take place in a single location. And even though an agglomerated economy benefits these cities by bringing in specialization and multiple competing suppliers, the conditions of slums continue to lag behind in terms of quality and adequate housing. Alonso-Villar argues that the existence of transport costs implies that the best locations for a firm will be those with easy access to markets, and the best locations for workers, those with easy access to goods. The concentration is the result of a self-reinforcing process of agglomeration. Concentration is a common trend of the distribution of population. Urban growth is dramatically intense in the less developed countries, where a large number of huge cities have started to appear; which means high poverty rates, crime, pollution and congestion.

=== Poor house planning ===
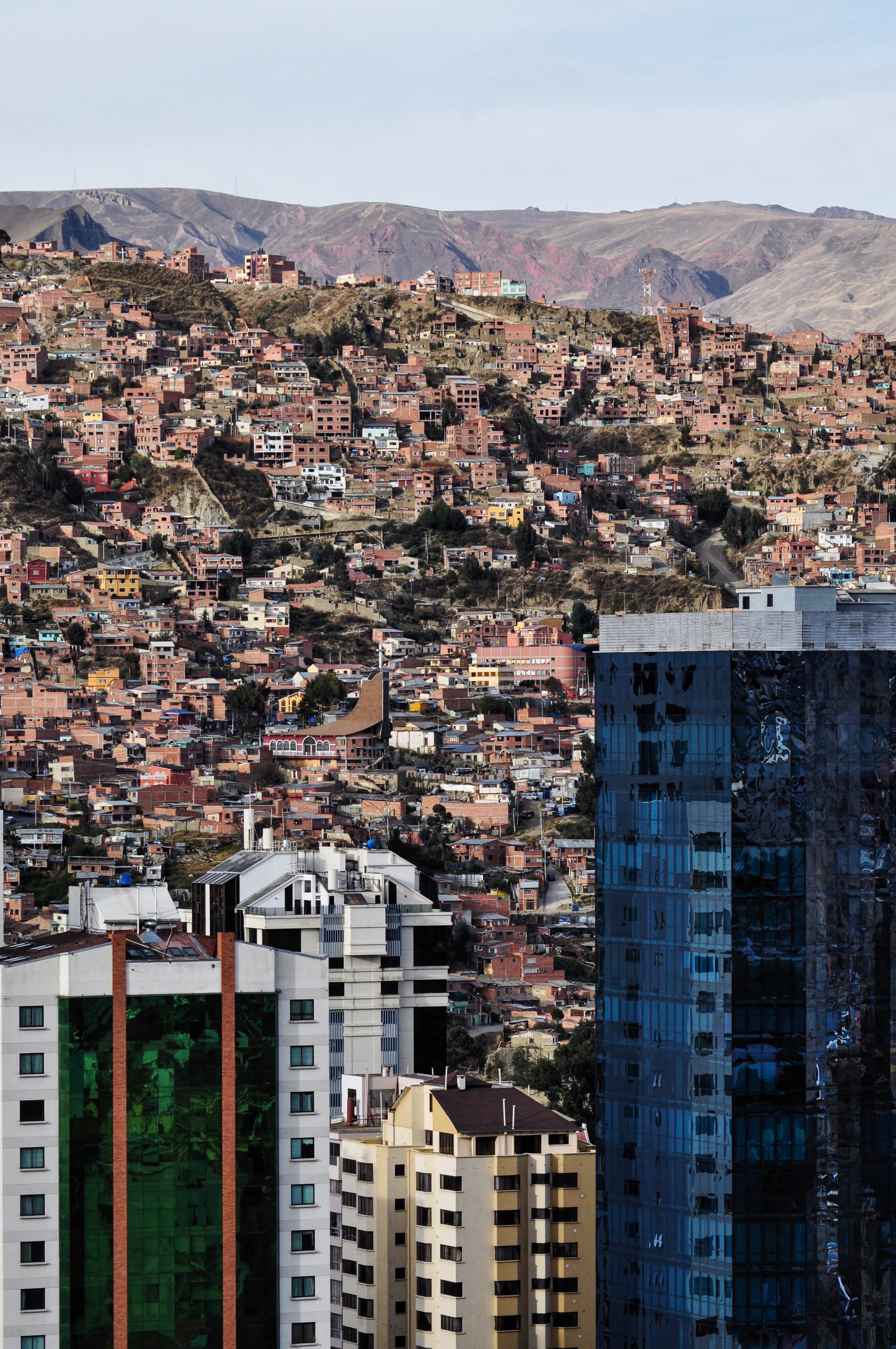
A large slum pictured behind skyscrapers in a more developed area in La Paz, Bolivia.

Lack of affordable low-cost housing and poor planning encourages the supply side of slums. The Millennium Development Goals proposes that member nations should make a "significant improvement in the lives of at least 100 million slum dwellers" by 2020. If member nations succeed in achieving this goal, 90% of the world total slum dwellers may remain in the poorly housed settlements by 2020. Choguill claims that the large number of slum dwellers indicates a deficiency of practical housing policy. Whenever there is a significant gap in growing demand for housing and insufficient supply of affordable housing, this gap is typically met in part by slums. The Economist has observed that "good housing is obviously better than a slum, but a slum is better than none".

Insufficient financial resources and lack of coordination in government bureaucracy are two main causes of poor house planning. Financial deficiency in some governments may explain the lack of affordable public housing for the poor since any improvement of the tenant in slums and expansion of public housing programs involve a great increase in the government expenditure. The problem can also lie on the failure in coordination among different departments in charge of economic development, urban planning, and land allocation. In some cities, governments assume that the housing market will adjust the supply of housing with a change in demand. However, with little economic incentive, the housing market is more likely to develop middle-income housing rather than low-cost housing. The urban poor gradually become marginalized in the housing market where few houses are built to sell to them.

=== Colonialism and segregation ===
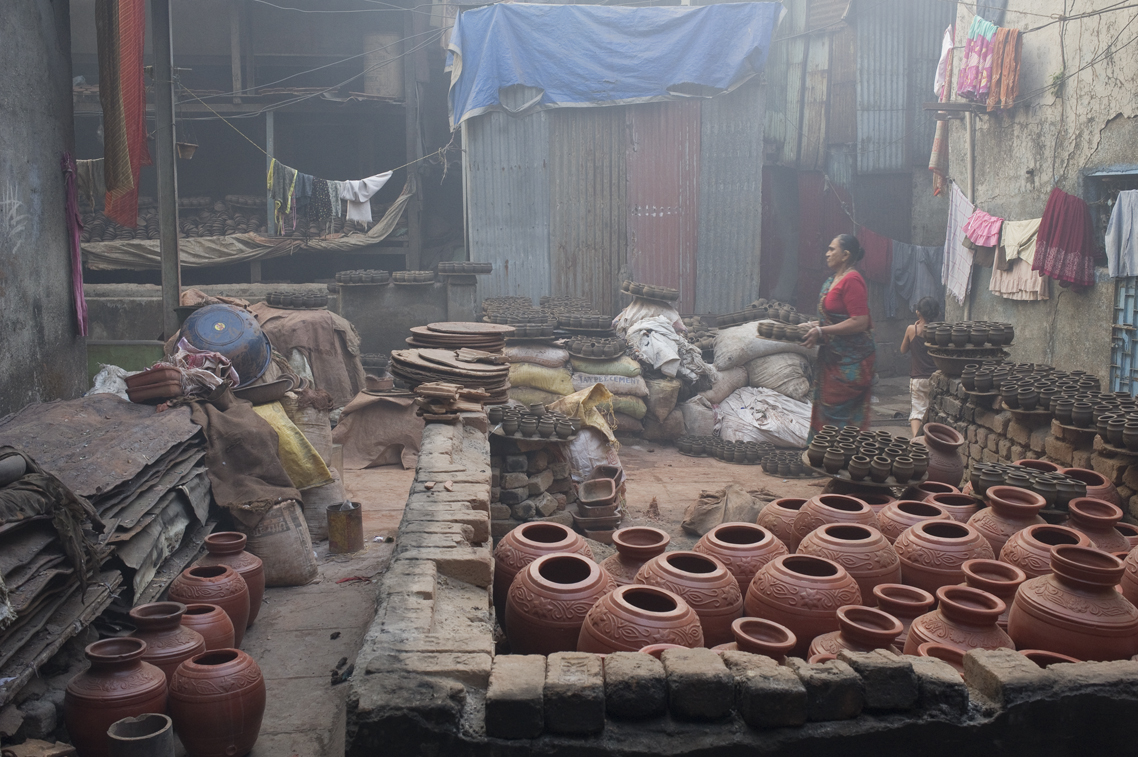
An integrated slum dwelling and informal economy inside Dharavi of Mumbai. Dharavi slum started in 1887 with industrial and segregationist policies of the British colonial era. The slum housing, tanneries, pottery and other economy established inside and around Dharavi during the British rule of India.

Some of the slums in today's world are a product of urbanization brought by colonialism. Europeans arrived in Kenya in the nineteenth century and created urban centres such as Nairobi mainly to serve their financial interests. They regarded the Africans as temporary migrants and needed them only for supply of labour. The housing policy aiming to accommodate these workers was not well enforced and the government built settlements in the form of single-occupancy bedspaces. Due to the cost of time and money in their movement back and forth between rural and urban areas, their families gradually migrated to the urban centre. As they could not afford to buy houses, slums were thus formed.

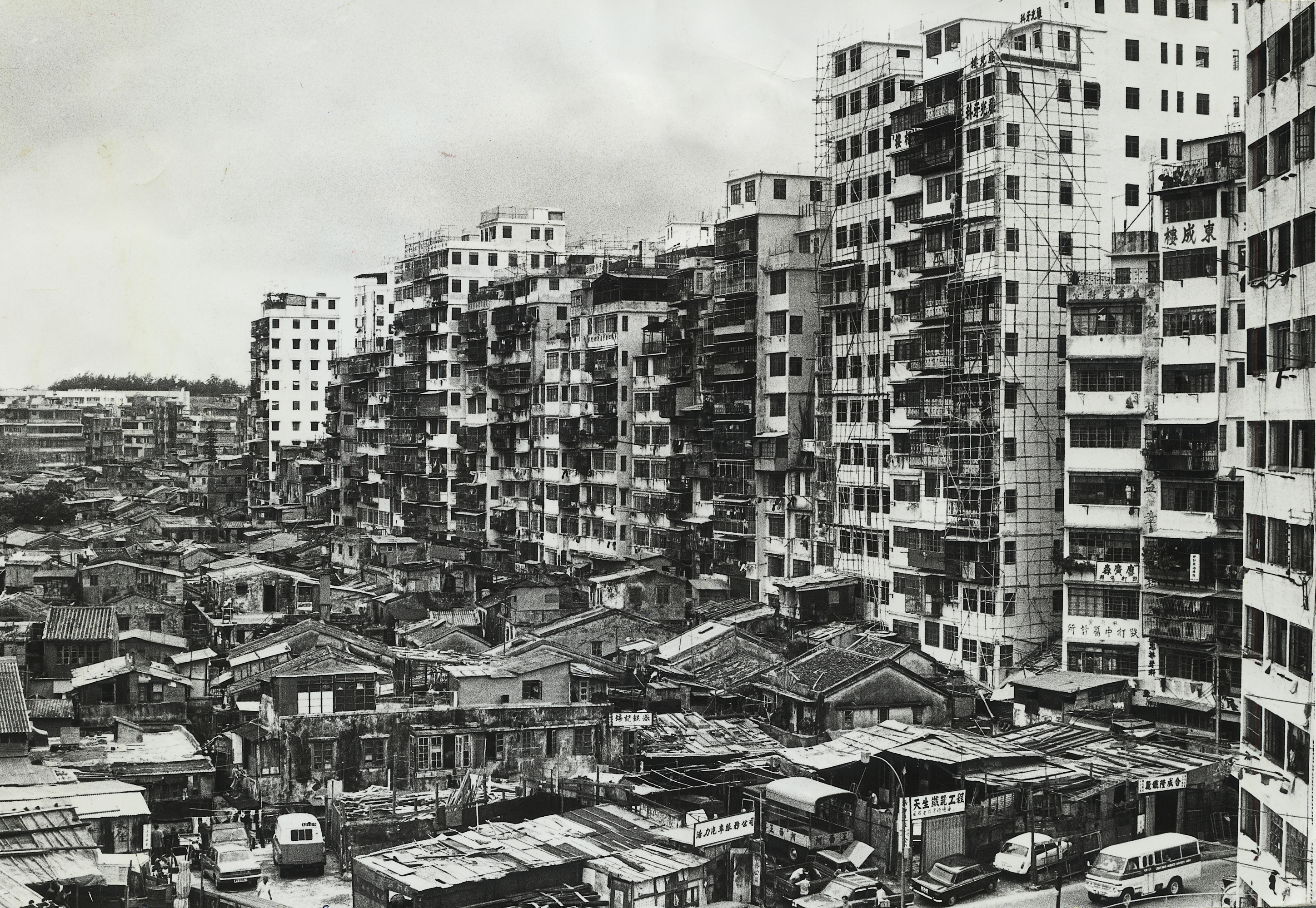
Kowloon Walled City, an exclave of the People's Republic of China located in Hong Kong, was the most densely populated place on Earth in the 1980s and early 1990s.

Others were created because of segregation imposed by the colonialists. For example, Dharavi slum of Mumbai – now one of the largest slums in India, used to be a village referred to as Koliwadas, and Mumbai used to be referred as Bombay. In 1887, the British colonial government expelled all tanneries, other noxious industry and poor natives who worked in the peninsular part of the city and colonial housing area, to what was back then the northern fringe of the city – a settlement now called Dharavi. This settlement attracted no colonial supervision or investment in terms of road infrastructure, sanitation, public services or housing. The poor moved into Dharavi, found work as servants in colonial offices and homes and in the foreign owned tanneries and other polluting industries near Dharavi. To live, the poor built shanty towns within easy commute to work. By 1947, the year India became an independent nation of the commonwealth, Dharavi had blossomed into Bombay's largest slum.

Similarly, some of the slums of Lagos, Nigeria sprouted because of neglect and policies of the colonial era. During apartheid era of South Africa, under the pretext of sanitation and plague epidemic prevention, racial and ethnic group segregation was pursued, people of colour were moved to the fringes of the city, policies that created Soweto and other slums – officially called townships. Large slums started at the fringes of segregation-conscious colonial city centers of Latin America.

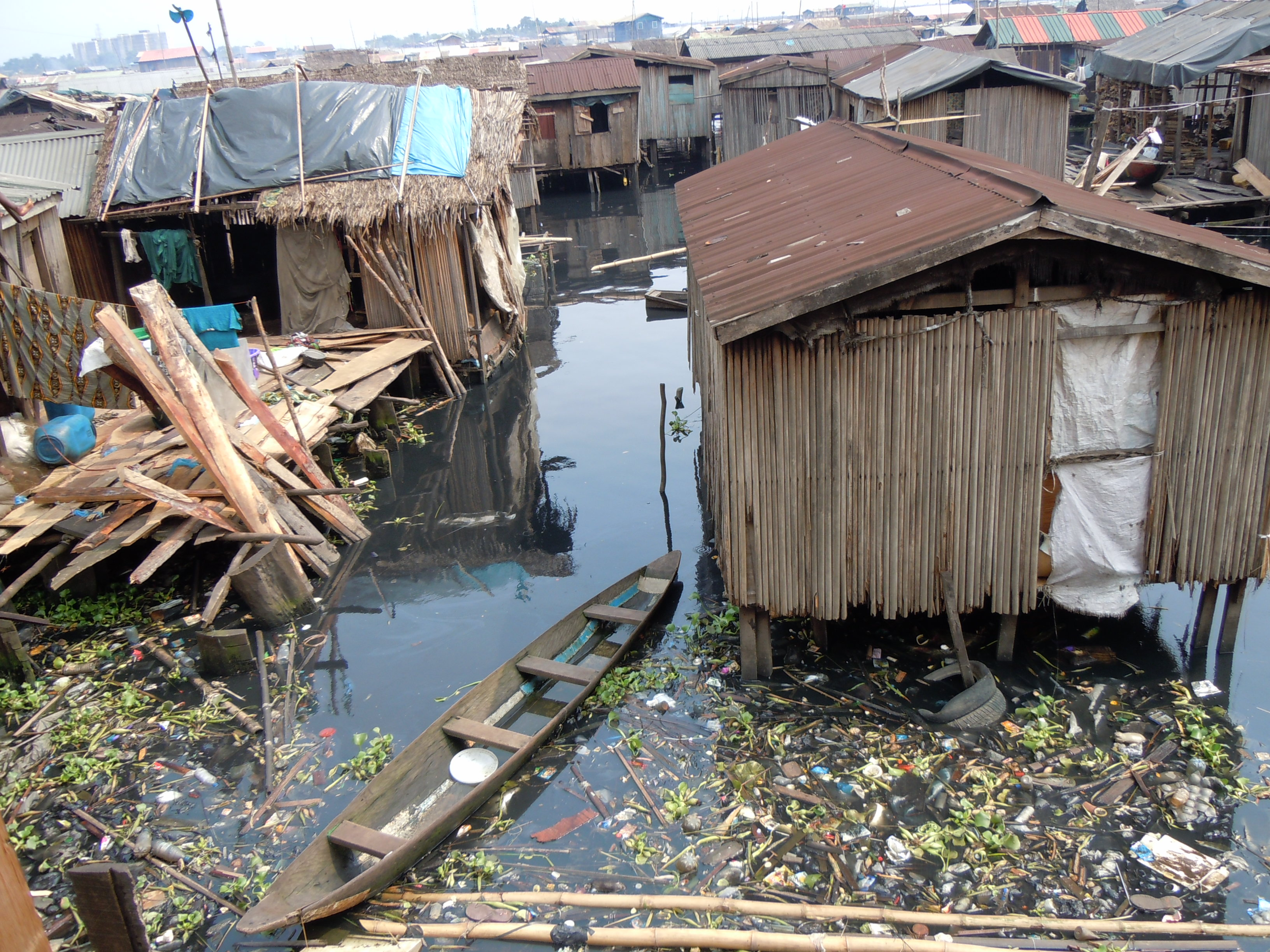
Makoko – One of the oldest slums in Nigeria, was originally a fishing village settlement, built on stilts on a lagoon. It developed into a slum and became home to about a hundred thousand people in Lagos. In 2012, it was partially destroyed by the city government, amidst controversy, to accommodate infrastructure for the city's growing population.

=== Poor infrastructure, social exclusion and economic stagnation ===
Social exclusion and poor infrastructure forces the poor to adapt to conditions beyond their control. Poor families that cannot afford transportation, or those who simply lack any form of affordable public transportation, generally end up in squat settlements within walking distance or close enough to the place of their formal or informal employment. Ben Arimah cites this social exclusion and poor infrastructure as a cause for numerous slums in African cities. Poor quality, unpaved streets encourage slums; a 1% increase in paved all-season roads, claims Arimah, reduces slum incidence rate by about 0.35%. Affordable public transport and economic infrastructure empowers poor people to move and consider housing options other than their current slums.

A growing economy that creates jobs at rate faster than population growth, offers people opportunities and incentive to relocate from poor slum to more developed neighborhoods. Economic stagnation, in contrast, creates uncertainties and risks for the poor, encouraging people to stay in the slums. Economic stagnation in a nation with a growing population reduces per capita disposal income in urban and rural areas, increasing urban and rural poverty. Rising rural poverty also encourages migration to urban areas. A poorly performing economy, in other words, increases poverty and rural-to-urban migration, thereby increasing slums.

=== Informal economy ===
Many slums grow because of growing informal economy which creates demand for workers. Informal economy is that part of an economy that is neither registered as a business nor licensed, one that does not pay taxes and is not monitored by local, state, or federal government. Informal economy grows faster than formal economy when government laws and regulations are opaque and excessive, government bureaucracy is corrupt and abusive of entrepreneurs, labour laws are inflexible, or when law enforcement is poor. Urban informal sector is between 20 and 60% of most developing economies' GDP; in Kenya, 78 per cent of non-agricultural employment is in the informal sector making up 42 per cent of GDP. In many cities the informal sector accounts for as much as 60 per cent of employment of the urban population. For example, in Benin, slum dwellers comprise 75 per cent of informal sector workers, while in Burkina Faso, the Central African Republic, Chad and Ethiopia, they make up 90 per cent of the informal labour force. Slums thus create an informal alternate economic ecosystem, that demands low paid flexible workers, something impoverished residents of slums deliver. In other words, countries where starting, registering and running a formal business is difficult, tend to encourage informal businesses and slums. Without a sustainable formal economy that raise incomes and create opportunities, squalid slums are likely to continue.

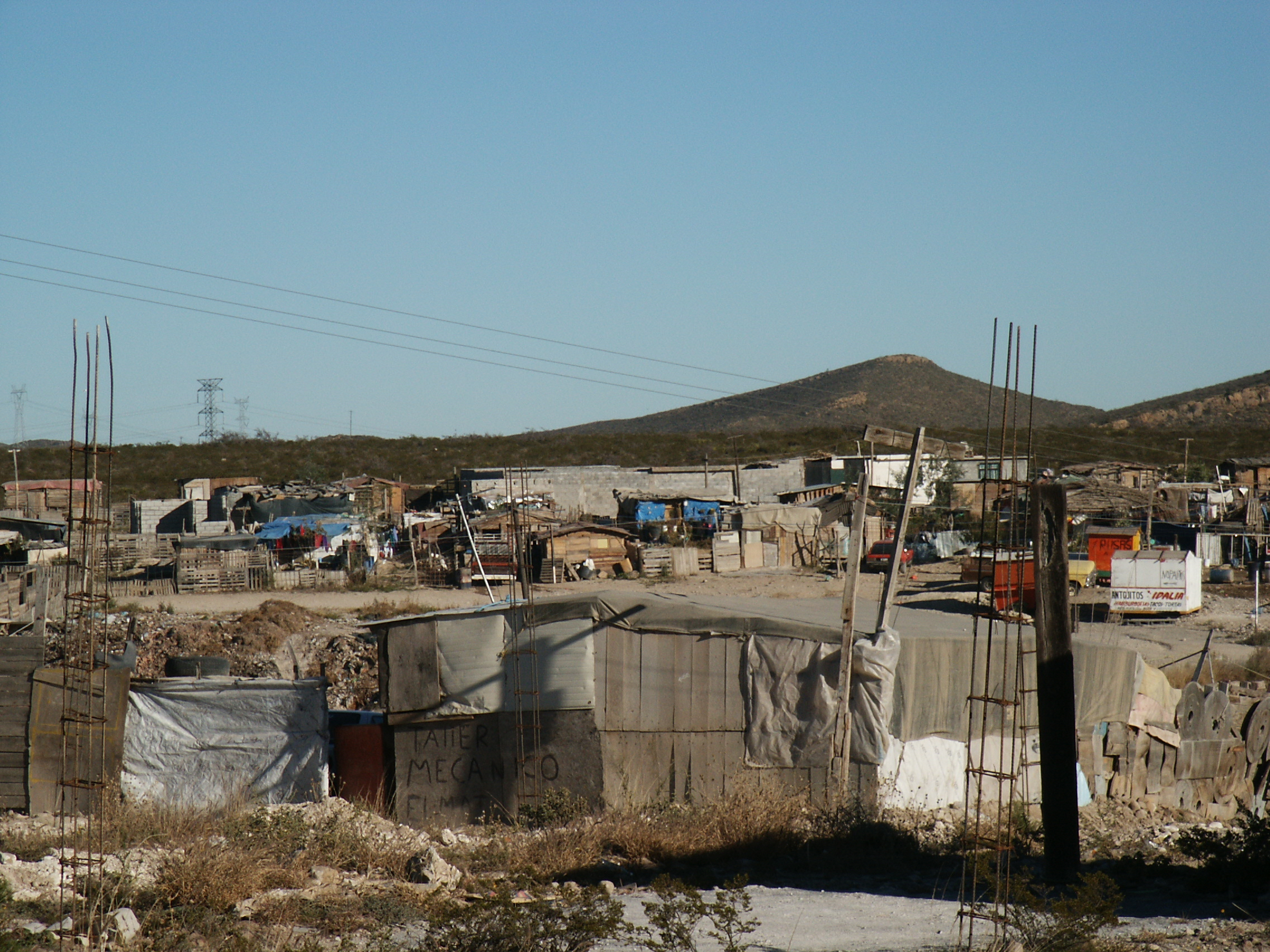
A slum near Ramos Arizpe in Mexico.

The World Bank and UN Habitat estimate, assuming no major economic reforms are undertaken, more than 80% of additional jobs in urban areas of developing world may be low-paying jobs in the informal sector. Everything else remaining same, this explosive growth in the informal sector is likely to be accompanied by a rapid growth of slums.

=== Labour, work ===
Research in the latest years based on ethnographic studies, conducted since 2008 about slums, published initially in 2017, has found out the primary importance of labour as the main cause of emergence, rural-urban migration, consolidation and growth of informal settlements. It also showed that work has also a crucial role in the self-construction of houses, alleys and overall informal planning of slums, as well as constituting a central aspect by residents living in slums when their communities suffer upgrading schemes or when they are resettled to formal housing.

For example, it was recently proved that in a small favela in the northeast of Brazil (Favela Sururu de Capote), the migration of dismissed sugar cane factory workers to the city of Maceió (who initiated the self-construction of the favela), has been driven by the necessity to find a job in the city. The same observation was noticed on the new migrants who contribute to the consolidation and growth of the slum. Also, the choice of the terrain for the construction of the favela (the margins of a lagoon) followed the rationale that it could offer conditions to provide them means of work. Circa 80% of residents living in that community live from the fishery of a mussel which divides the community through gender and age. Alleys and houses were planned to facilitate the working activities, that provided subsistence and livelihood to the community. When resettled, the main reason of changes of formal housing units was due to the lack of possibilities to perform their work in the new houses designed according to formal architecture principles, or even by the distances they had to travel to work in the slum where they originally lived, which was in turn faced by residents by self-constructing spaces to shelter the work originally performed in the slum, in the formal housing units. Similar observations were made in other slums. Residents also reported that their work constitutes their dignity, citizenship, and self-esteem in the underprivileged settings in which they live. The reflection of this recent research was possible due to participatory observations and the fact that the author of the research has lived in a slum to verify the socioeconomic practices which were prone to shape, plan and govern space in slums.

=== Poverty ===
Urban poverty encourages the formation and demand for slums. With rapid shift from rural to urban life, poverty migrates to urban areas. The urban poor arrives with hope, and very little of anything else. They typically have no access to shelter, basic urban services and social amenities. Slums are often the only option for the urban poor.

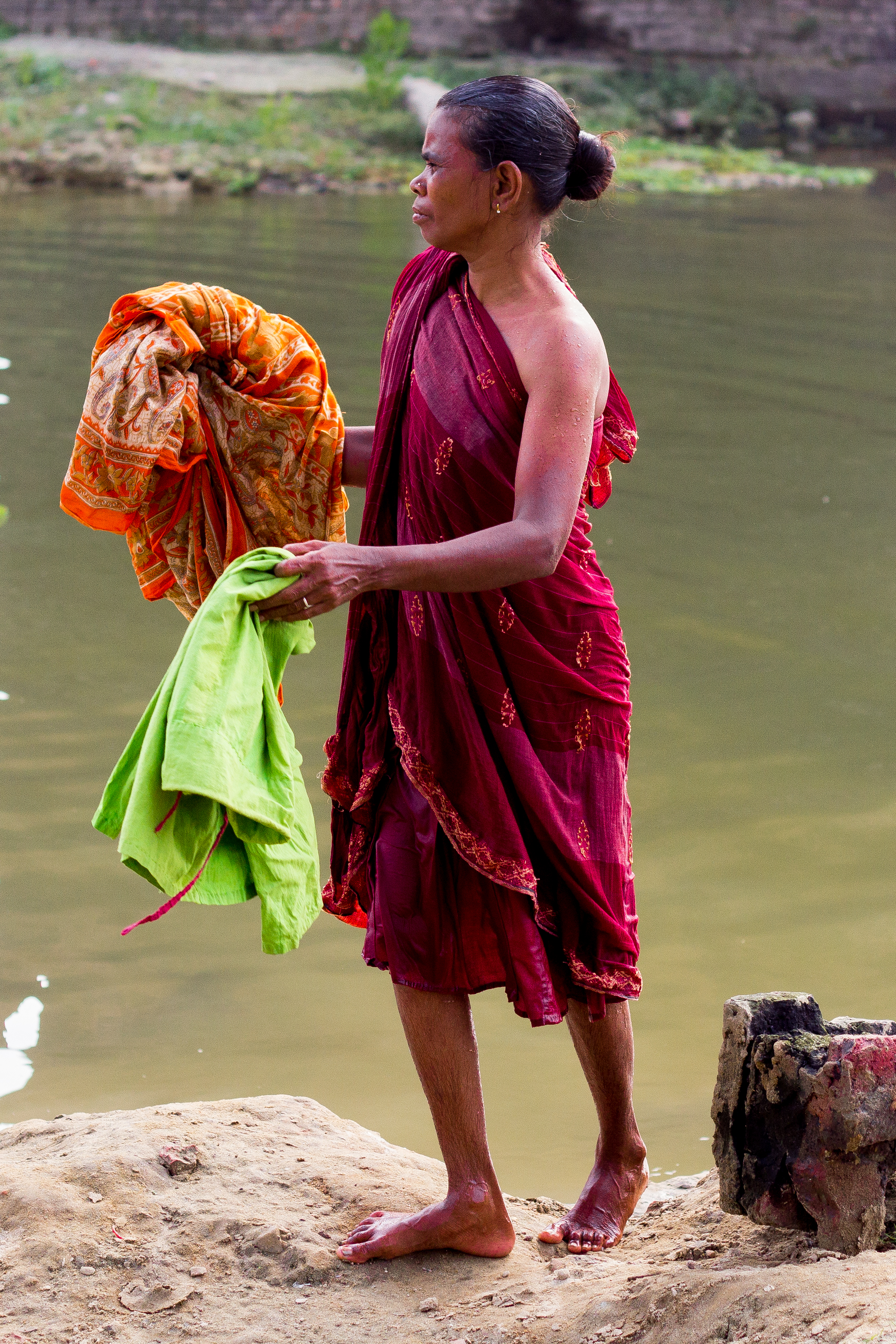
A woman from a slum is taking a bath in a river.

=== Politics ===
Many local and national governments have, for political interests, subverted efforts to remove, reduce or upgrade slums into better housing options for the poor. Throughout the second half of the 19th century, for example, French political parties relied on votes from slum population and had vested interests in maintaining that voting block. Removal and replacement of slum created a conflict of interest, and politics prevented efforts to remove, relocate or upgrade the slums into housing projects that are better than the slums. Similar dynamics are cited in favelas of Brazil, slums of India, and shanty towns of Kenya.

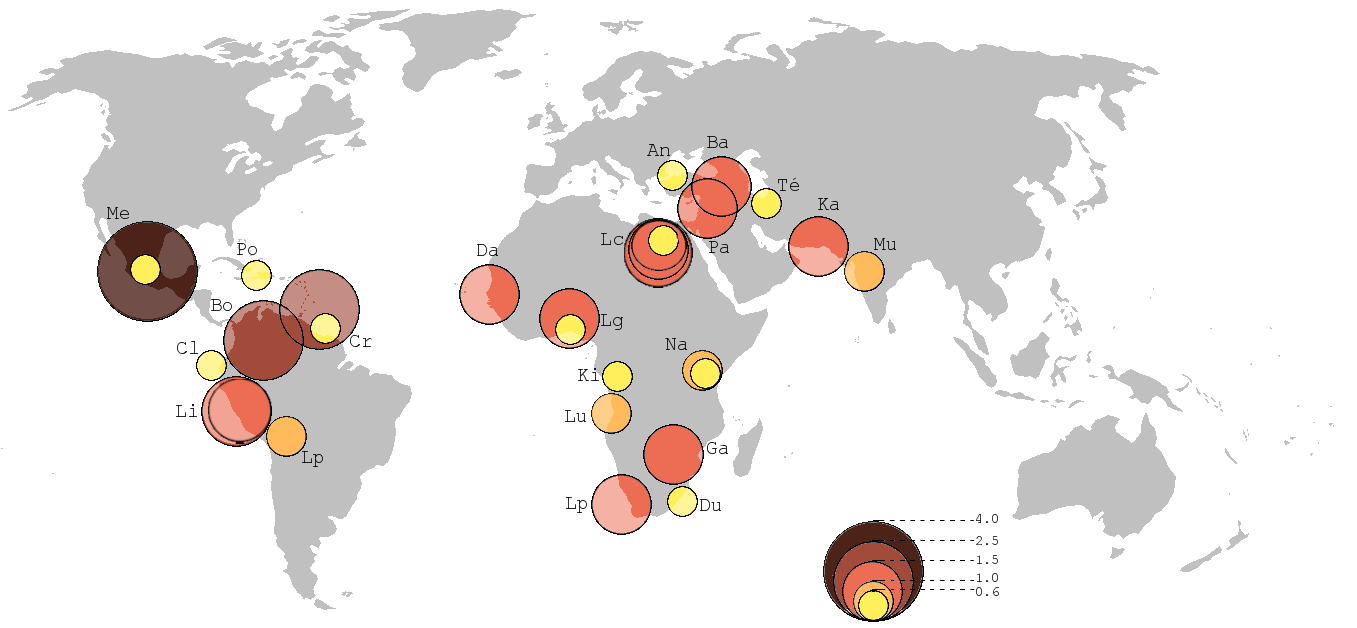
The location of 100 largest "contiguous" mega-slums in the world. Numerous other regions have slums, but those slums are scattered. The numbers show population in millions per mega-slum, the initials are derived from city name. Some of the largest slums of the world are in areas of political or social conflicts.

Scholars claim politics also drives rural-urban migration and subsequent settlement patterns. Pre-existing patronage networks, sometimes in the form of gangs and other times in the form of political parties or social activists, inside slums seek to maintain their economic, social and political power. These social and political groups have vested interests to encourage migration by ethnic groups that will help maintain the slums, and reject alternate housing options even if the alternate options are better in every aspect than the slums they seek to replace.

=== Social conflicts ===
Millions of Lebanese people formed slums during the Lebanese Civil War from 1975 to 1990. Similarly, in recent years, numerous slums have sprung around Kabul to accommodate rural Afghans escaping Taliban violence.

=== Natural disasters ===
Major natural disasters in poor nations often lead to migration of disaster-affected families from areas crippled by the disaster to unaffected areas, the creation of temporary tent city and slums, or expansion of existing slums. These slums tend to become permanent because the residents do not want to leave, as in the case of slums near Port-au-Prince after the 2010 Haiti earthquake, and slums near Dhaka after 2007 Bangladesh Cyclone Sidr.

== Slums in developing countries ==
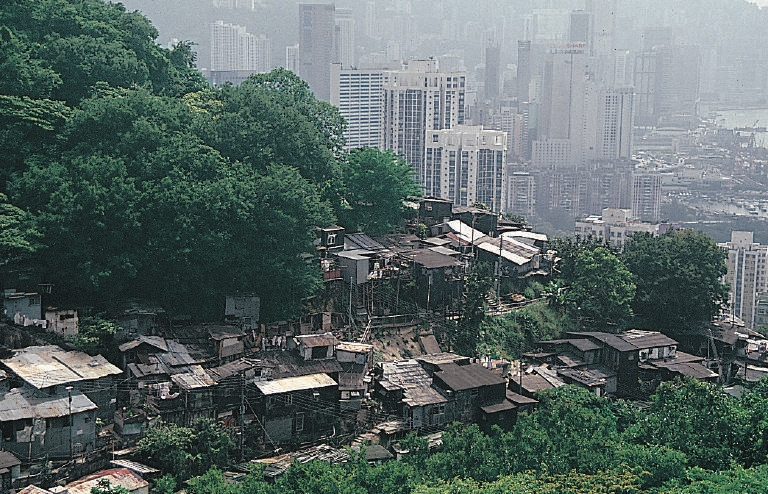
Slum in Tai Hang, Hong Kong, in the 1990s

=== Location and growth ===
Slums typically begin at the outskirts of a city. Over time, the city may expand past the original slums, enclosing the slums inside the urban perimeter. New slums sprout at the new boundaries of the expanding city, usually on publicly owned lands, thereby creating an urban sprawl mix of formal settlements, industry, retail zones and slums. This makes the original slums valuable property, densely populated with many conveniences attractive to the poor.

At their start, slums are typically located in the least desirable lands near the town or city, that are state owned, are part of a philanthropic trust, possessed by a religious entity, or have no clear land title. In cities located in mountainous terrain, slums begin on difficult to reach slopes or start at the bottom of flood prone valleys, often hidden from the plain view of downtown but close to some natural water source. In cities located near lagoons, marshlands and rivers, they start on banks or on stilts above water or the dry river bed; in flat terrain, slums begin on lands unsuitable for agriculture, near city trash dumps, next to railway tracks, and other shunned undesirable locations.

These strategies shield slums from the risk of being noticed and removed when they are small and most vulnerable to local government officials. Initial homes tend to be tents and shacks that are quick to install, but as a slum grows, becomes established and newcomers pay the informal association or gang for the right to live in the slum, the construction materials for the slums switches to more durable materials such as bricks and concrete, suitable for slum's topography.

The original slums, over time, get established next to centers of economic activity, schools, hospitals, and sources of employment, which the poor rely on. Established old slums, surrounded by the formal city infrastructure, cannot expand horizontally; therefore, they grow vertically by stacking additional rooms, sometimes for a growing family and sometimes as a source of rent from new arrivals in slums. Some slums name themselves after founders of political parties, locally respected historical figures, current politicians or a politician's spouse to garner political backing against eviction.

=== Insecure tenure ===
Informality of land tenure is a key characteristic of urban slums. At their start, slums are typically located in undesirable lands near the town or city, that are state owned or philanthropic trust owned or religious entity owned or have no clear land title. Some immigrants regard unoccupied land as land without owners and therefore occupy it. In some cases the local community or the government allots lands to people, which will later develop into slums and over which the dwellers don't have property rights. Informal land tenure also includes occupation of land belonging to someone else. According to Flood, 51 percent of slums are based on invasion of private land in sub-Saharan Africa, 39 percent in North Africa and West Asia, 10 percent in South Asia, 40 percent in East Asia, and 40 percent in Latin America and the Caribbean. In some cases, once the slum has many residents, the early residents form a social group, an informal association or a gang that controls newcomers, charges a fee for the right to live in the slums, and dictates where and how new homes get built within the slum. The newcomers, having paid for the right, feel they have commercial right to the home in that slum. The slum dwellings, built as the slum grows, are constructed without checking land ownership rights or building codes, are not registered with the city, and often not recognized by the city or state governments.

Secure land tenure is important for slum dwellers as an authentic recognition of their residential status in urban areas. It also encourages them to upgrade their housing facilities, which will give them protection against natural and unnatural hazards. Undocumented ownership with no legal title to the land also prevents slum settlers from applying for mortgage, which might worsen their financial situations. In addition, without registration of the land ownership, the government has difficulty in upgrading basic facilities and improving the living environment. Insecure tenure of the slum, as well as a lack of socially and politically acceptable alternatives to slums, also creates difficulty in citywide infrastructure development such as rapid mass transit, electrical and sewer pipe layout, highways and roads.

=== Substandard housing and overcrowding ===
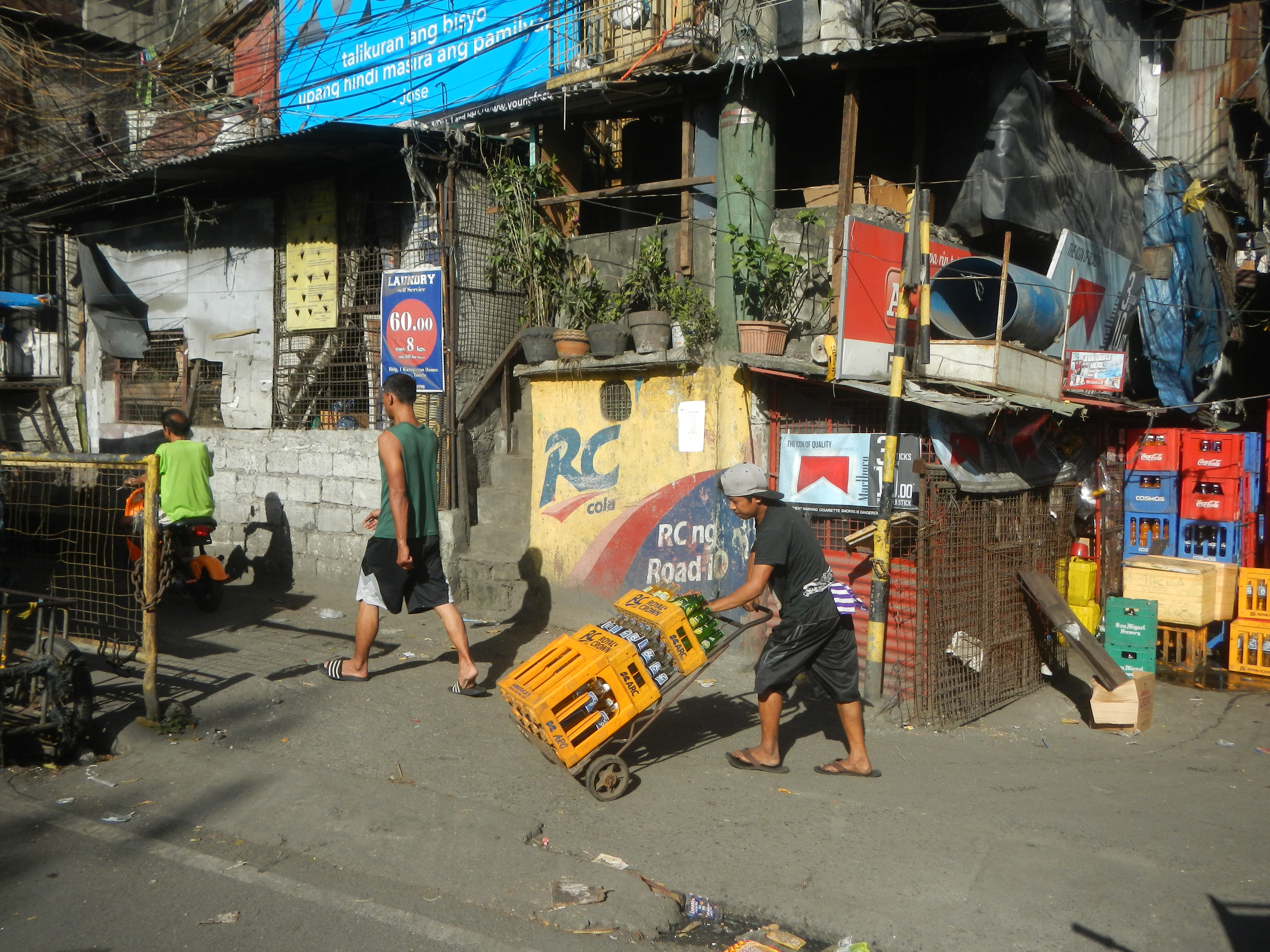
Substandard housing in a slum in Manila, Philippines.

Slum areas are characterized by substandard housing structures. Shanty homes are often built hurriedly, on ad hoc basis, with materials unsuitable for housing. Often the construction quality is inadequate to withstand heavy rains, high winds, or other local climate and location. Paper, plastic, earthen floors, mud-and-wattle walls, wood held together by ropes, straw or torn metal pieces as roofs are some of the materials of construction. In some cases, brick and cement is used, but without attention to proper design and structural engineering requirements. Various space, dwelling placement bylaws and local building codes may also be extensively violated.

Overcrowding is another characteristic of slums. Many dwellings are single room units, with high occupancy rates. Each dwelling may be cohabited by multiple families. Five and more persons may share a one-room unit; the room is used for cooking, sleeping and living. Overcrowding is also seen near sources of drinking water, cleaning, and sanitation where one toilet may serve dozens of families. In a slum of Kolkata, India, over 10 people sometimes share a 45 m^{2} room. In Kibera slum of Nairobi, Kenya, population density is estimated at 2,000 people per hectare — or about 500,000 people in one square mile.

However, the density and neighbourhood effects of slum populations may also offer an opportunity to target health interventions.

=== Inadequate or no infrastructure ===
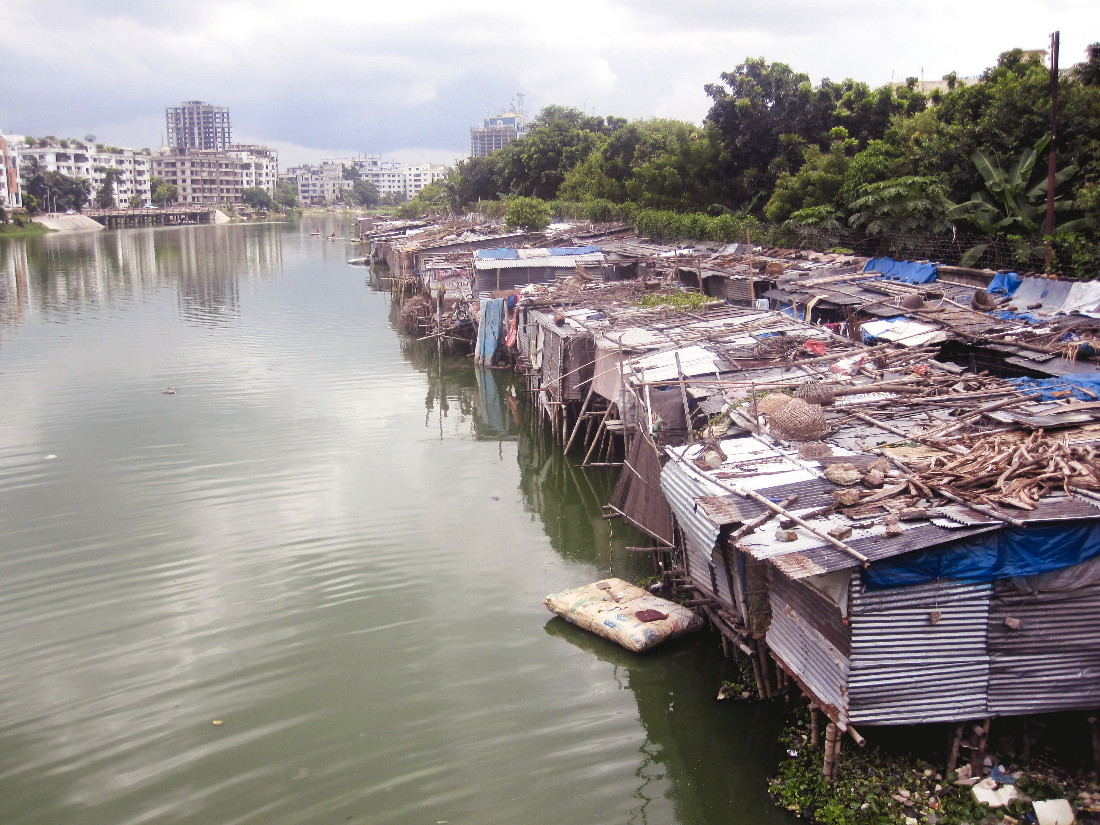
Slum with tiled roofs and river in Dhaka, Bangladesh.

One of the identifying characteristics of slums is the lack of or inadequate public infrastructure. From safe drinking water to electricity, from basic health care to police services, from affordable public transport to fire/ambulance services, from sanitation sewer to paved roads, new slums usually lack all of these. Established, old slums sometimes garner official support and get some of these infrastructure such as paved roads and unreliable electricity or water supply. Slums usually lack street addresses, which creates further problems.

Slums often have very narrow alleys that do not allow vehicles (including emergency vehicles) to pass. The lack of services such as routine garbage collection allows rubbish to accumulate in huge quantities. The lack of infrastructure is caused by the informal nature of settlement and no planning for the poor by government officials. Fires are often a serious problem.

In many countries, local and national government often refuse to recognize slums, because the slum are on disputed land, or because of the fear that quick official recognition will encourage more slum formation and seizure of land illegally. Recognizing and notifying slums often triggers a creation of property rights, and requires that the government provide public services and infrastructure to the slum residents. With poverty and informal economy, slums do not generate tax revenues for the government and therefore tend to get minimal or slow attention. In other cases, the narrow and haphazard layout of slum streets, houses and substandard shacks, along with persistent threat of crime and violence against infrastructure workers, makes it difficult to layout reliable, safe, cost effective and efficient infrastructure. In yet others, the demand far exceeds the government bureaucracy's ability to deliver.

Low socioeconomic status of its residents is another common characteristic attributed to slum residents.

== Problems ==
=== Vulnerability to natural and man-made hazards ===
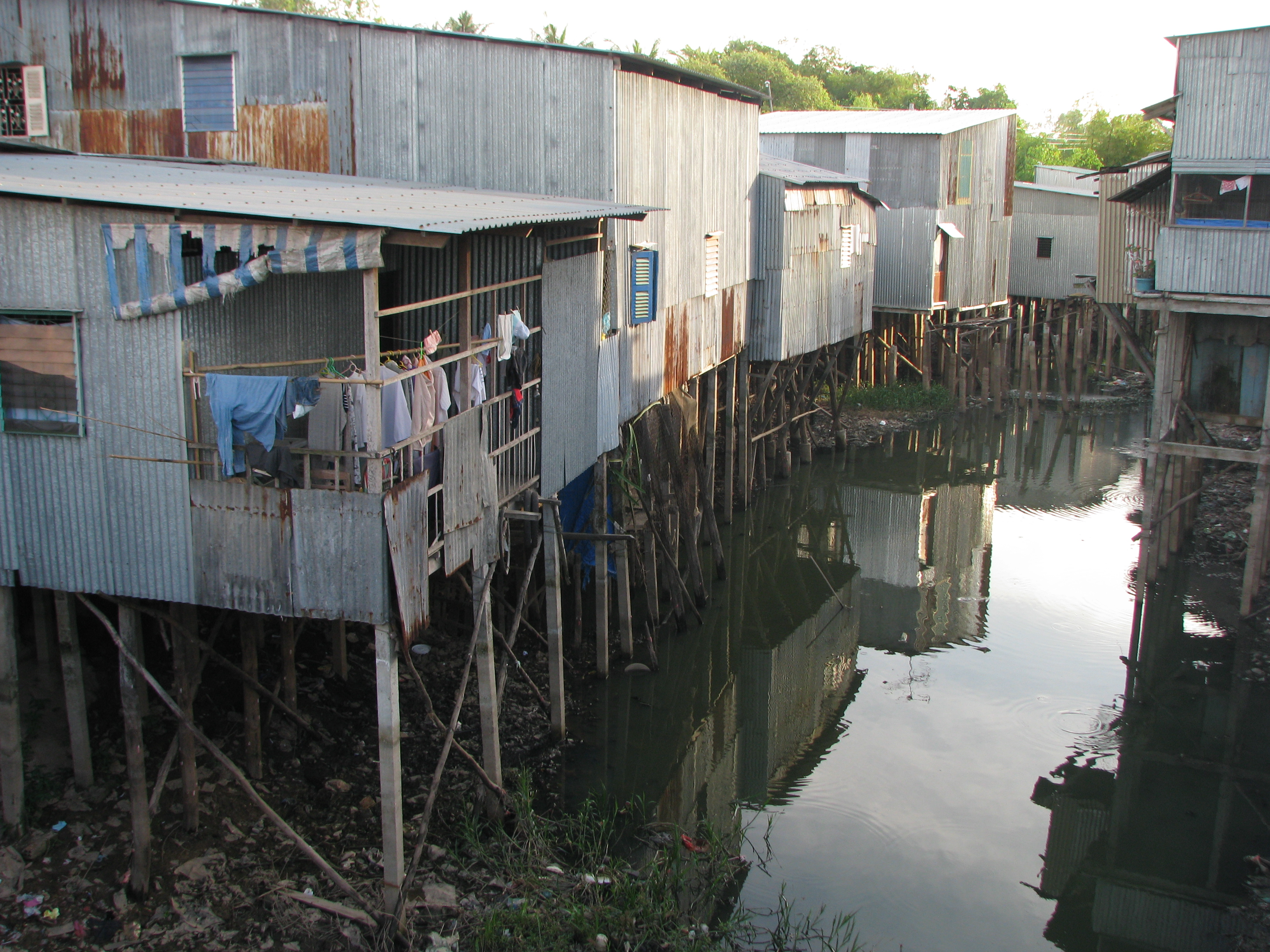
Slums in the city of Chau Doc, Vietnam over river Hậu (Mekong branch). These slums are on stilts to withstand routine floods which last 3 to 4 months every year.

Slums are often placed in areas vulnerable to natural disasters such as landslides and floods. In cities located in mountainous terrain, slums begin on slopes difficult to reach or start at the bottom of flood-prone valleys, often hidden from plain view in the city center but close to some natural water source. In cities located near lagoons, marshlands and rivers, they start at banks or on stilts above water or the dry river bed; in flat terrain, slums begin on lands unsuitable for agriculture, near city trash dumps, next to railway tracks, and other shunned, undesirable locations. These strategies shield slums from the risk of being noticed and removed when they are small and most vulnerable to local government officials. However, the ad hoc construction, lack of quality control on building materials used, poor maintenance, and uncoordinated spatial design make them prone to extensive damage during earthquakes as well from decay. These risks will be intensified by climate change.

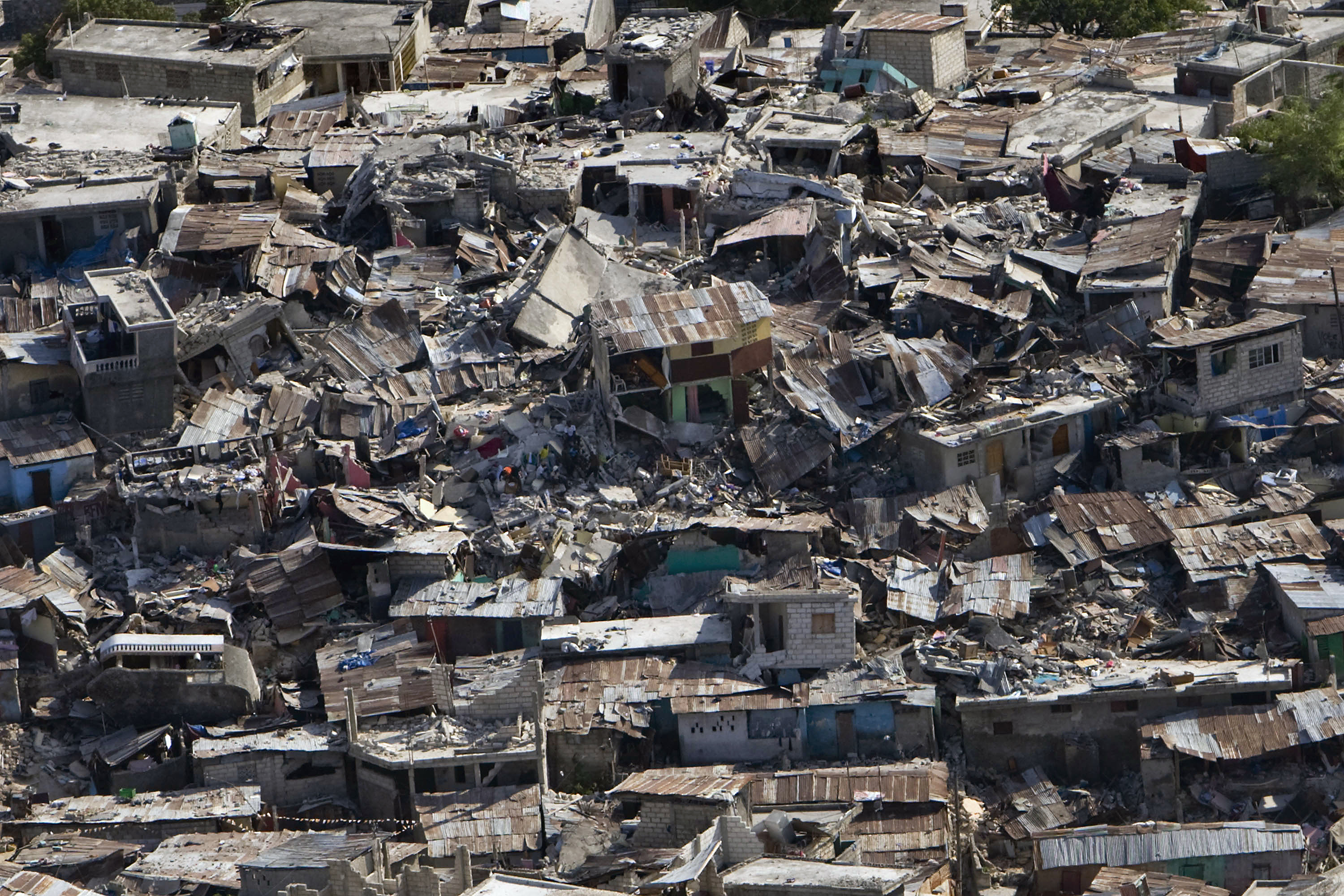
A slum in Haiti damaged by 2010 earthquake. Slums are vulnerable to extensive damage and human fatalities from landslides, floods, earthquakes, fire, high winds and other severe weather.

Some slums risk man-made hazards such as toxic industries, traffic congestion and collapsing infrastructure. Fires are another major risk to slums and its inhabitants, with streets often too narrow to allow proper and quick access to fire control trucks.

=== Unemployment and informal economy ===
Due to lack of skills and education as well as competitive job markets, many slum dwellers face high rates of unemployment. The limit of job opportunities causes many of them to employ themselves in the informal economy, inside the slum or in developed urban areas near the slum. This can sometimes be licit informal economy or illicit informal economy without working contract or any social security. Some of them are seeking jobs at the same time and some of those will eventually find jobs in formal economies after gaining some professional skills in informal sectors.

Examples of licit informal economy include street vending, household enterprises, product assembly and packaging, making garlands and embroideries, domestic work, shoe polishing or repair, driving tuk-tuk or manual rickshaws, construction workers or manually driven logistics, and handicrafts production. In some slums, people sort and recycle trash of different kinds (from household garbage to electronics) for a living – selling either the odd usable goods or stripping broken goods for parts or raw materials. Typically these licit informal economies require the poor to regularly pay a bribe to local police and government officials.

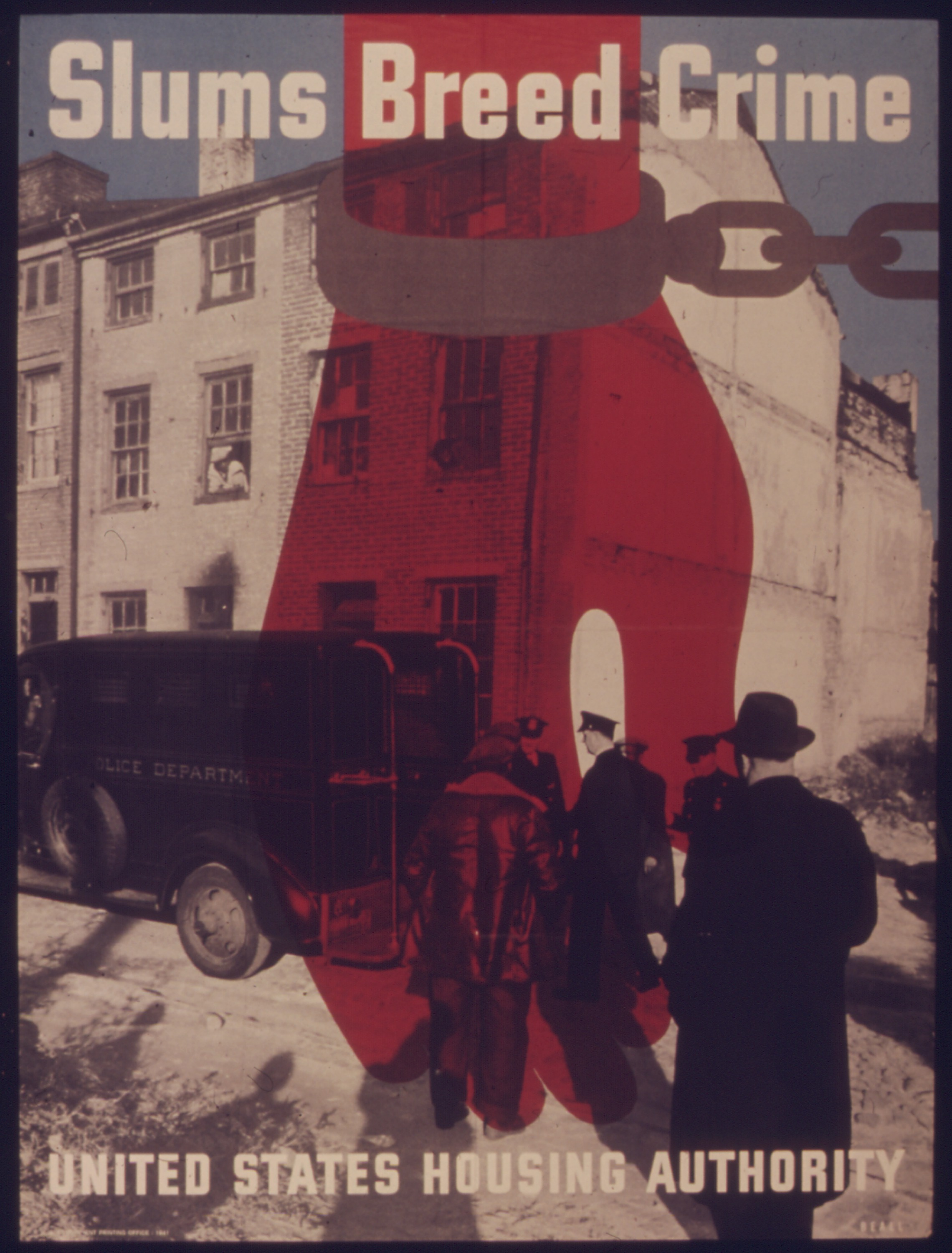
A propaganda poster linking slum to violence, used by US Housing Authority in the 1940s. City governments in the US created many suchpropaganda posters and launched a media campaign to gain citizen support for slum clearance and planned public housing.

Examples of illicit informal economy include illegal substance and weapons trafficking, drug or moonshine/changaa production, prostitution and gambling – all sources of risks to the individual, families and society. Recent reports reflecting illicit informal economies include drug trade and distribution in Brazil's favelas, production of fake goods in the colonías of Tijuana, smuggling in katchi abadis and slums of Karachi, or production of synthetic drugs in the townships of Johannesburg.

The slum-dwellers in informal economies run many risks. The informal sector, by its very nature, means income insecurity and lack of social mobility. There is also absence of legal contracts, protection of labour rights, regulations and bargaining power in informal employments.

=== Violence ===
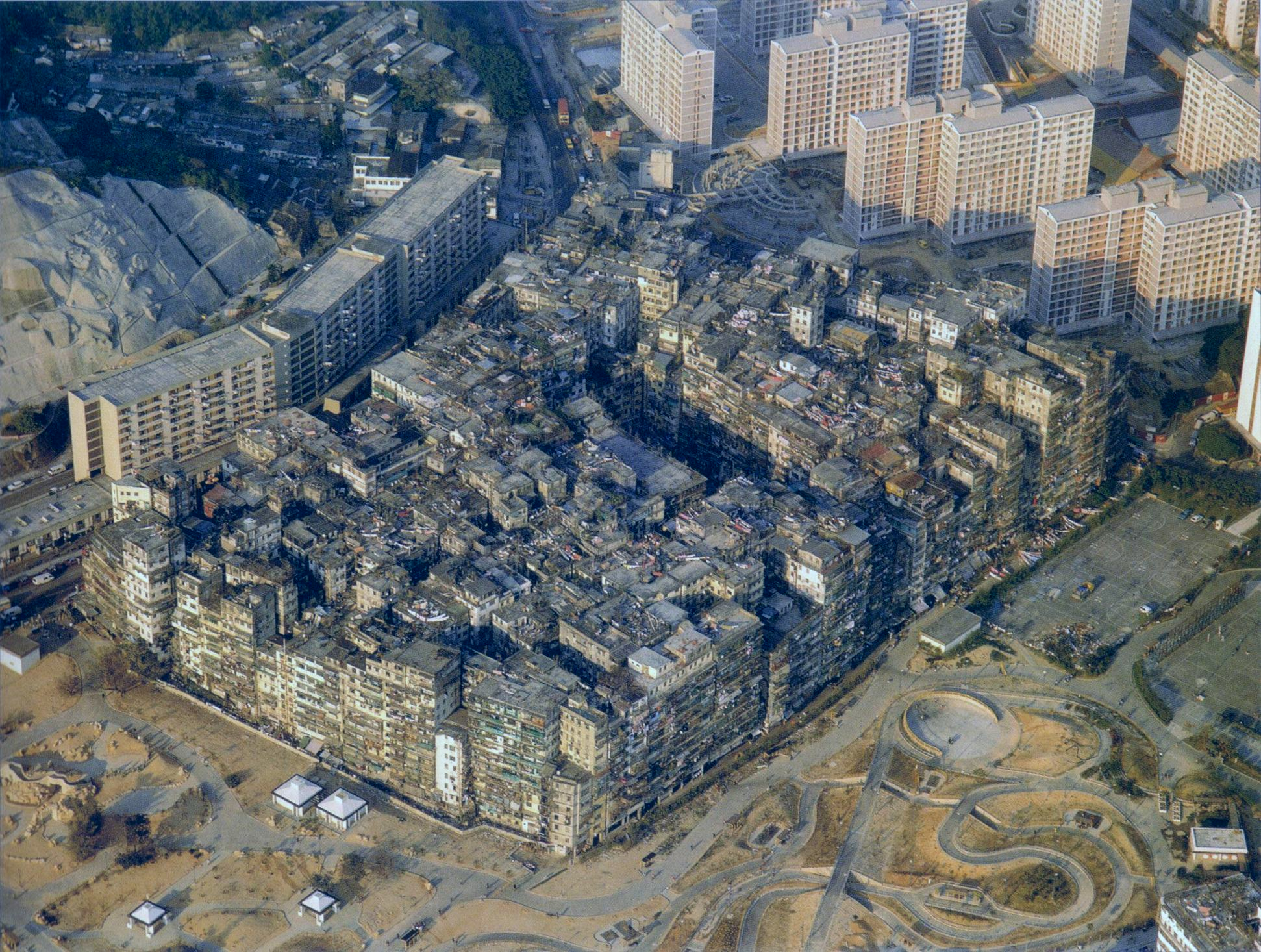
From the 1940s to the 1990s, the Kowloon Walled City in Hong Kong was controlled by local triads.

Some scholars suggest that crime is one of the main concerns in slums. Empirical data suggest crime rates are higher in some slums than in non-slums, with slum homicides alone reducing life expectancy of a resident in a Brazil slum by 7 years than for a resident in nearby non-slum. In some countries, including Venezuela, officials have sent in the military to control slum criminal violence involved with drugs and weapons. Rape is another serious issue related to crime in slums. In Nairobi slums, for example, one-fourth of all teenage girls are raped each year.

On the other hand, while UN-Habitat reports some slums are more exposed to crimes with higher crime rates (for instance, the traditional inner-city slums), crime is not the direct resultant of block layout in many slums. Rather crime is one of the symptoms of slum dwelling; thus slums consist of more victims than criminals. Consequently, slums do not always have consistently high crime rates, as the worst crime rates exist in sectors maintaining influence of illicit economy—such as drug trafficking, brewing, prostitution, and gambling. Often in such circumstances, multiple gangs fight for control over revenue.

Slum crime rate correlates with insufficient law enforcement and inadequate public policing. In main cities of developing countries, law enforcement lags behind urban growth and slum expansion. Often police can not reduce crime because, due to ineffective city planning and governance, slums set inefficient crime prevention system. Such problems are not primarily due to community indifference. Leads and information intelligence from slums are rare, streets are narrow and a potential death traps to patrol, and many in the slum community have an inherent distrust of authorities from fear ranging from eviction to collection on unpaid utility bills to general law and order. Lack of formal recognition by the governments also leads to few formal policing and public justice institutions in slums.

Women in slums are at greater risk of physical and sexual violence. Factors such as unemployment that lead to insufficient resources in the household can increase marital stress and therefore exacerbate domestic violence.

Slums are often non-secured areas and women often risk sexual violence when they walk alone in slums late at night. Violence against women and women's security in slums emerge as recurrent issues.

Another prevalent form of violence in slums is armed violence (gun violence), mostly existing in African and Latin American slums. It leads to homicide and the emergence of criminal gangs. Typical victims are male slum residents. Violence often leads to retaliatory and vigilante violence within the slum. Gang and drug wars are endemic in some slums, predominantly between male residents of slums. The police sometimes participate in gender-based violence against men as well by picking up some men, beating them and putting them in jail. Domestic violence against men also exists in slums, including verbal abuses and even physical violence from households.

Cohen as well as Merton theorized that the cycle of slum violence does not mean slums are inevitably criminogenic, rather in some cases it is frustration against life in slum, and a consequence of denial of opportunity to slum residents to leave the slum.

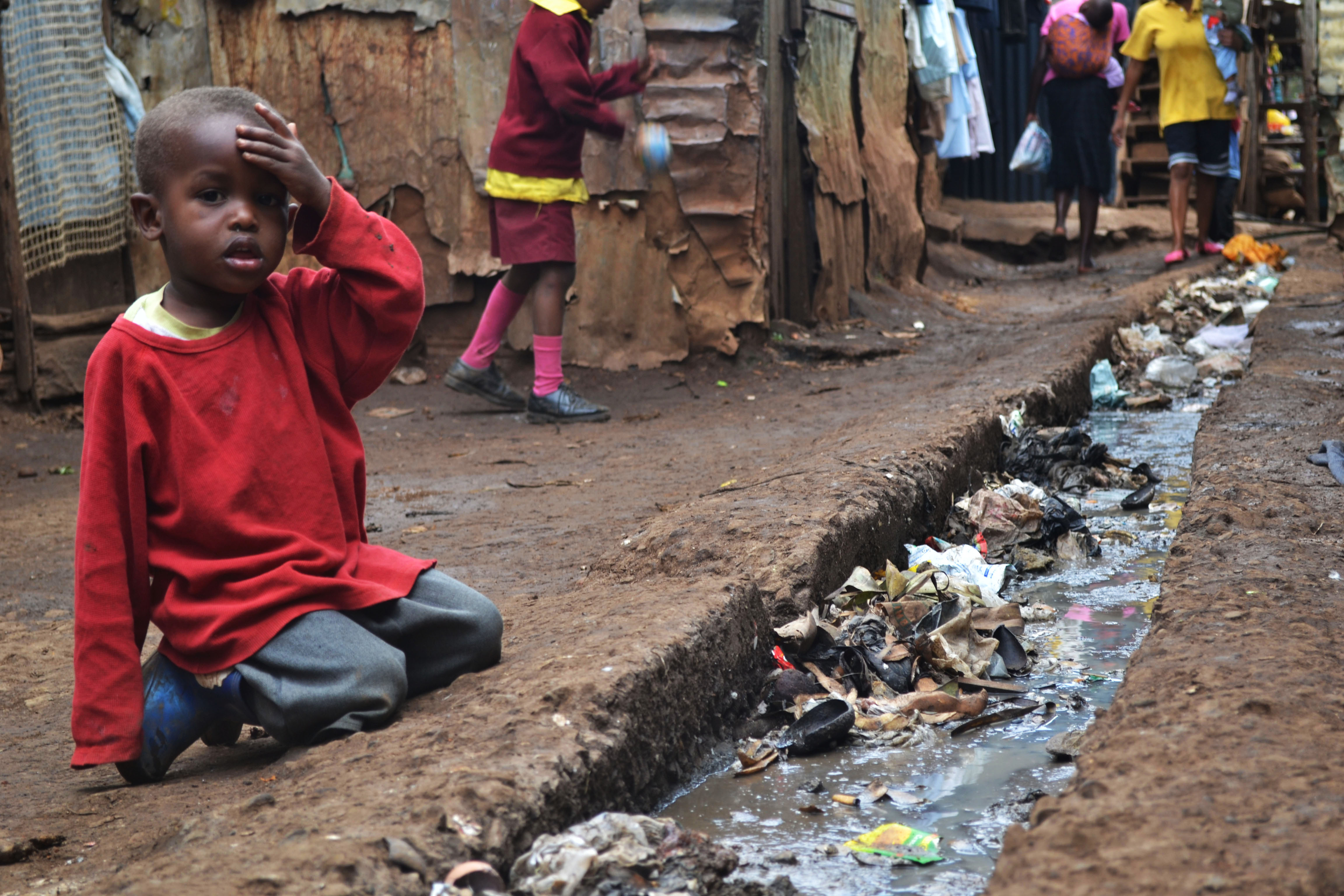
A young boy sits over an open sewer in the Kibera slum, Nairobi.

=== Infectious diseases and epidemics ===
Slum dwellers usually experience a high rate of disease. Diseases that have been reported in slums include cholera, HIV/AIDS, measles, malaria, dengue, typhoid, drug resistant tuberculosis, and other epidemics. Studies focus on children's health in slums address that cholera and diarrhea are especially common among young children. Besides children's vulnerability to diseases, many scholars also focus on high HIV/AIDS prevalence in slums among women. Throughout slum areas in various parts of the world, infectious diseases are a significant contributor to high mortality rates. For example, according to a study in Nairobi's slums, HIV/AIDS and tuberculosis attributed to about 50% of the mortality burden.

Factors that have been attributed to a higher rate of disease transmission in slums include high population densities, poor living conditions, low vaccination rates, insufficient health-related data and inadequate health service. Overcrowding leads to faster and wider spread of diseases due to the limited space in slum housing. Poor living conditions also make slum dwellers more vulnerable to certain diseases. Poor water quality, a manifest example, is a cause of many major illnesses including malaria, diarrhea and trachoma. Improving living conditions such as introduction of better sanitation and access to basic facilities can ameliorate the effects of diseases, such as cholera.

Slums have been historically linked to epidemics, and this trend has continued in modern times. For example, the slums of West African nations such as Liberia were crippled by as well as contributed to the outbreak and spread of Ebola in 2014. Slums are considered a major public health concern and potential breeding grounds of drug resistant diseases for the entire city, the nation, as well as the global community.

=== Child malnutrition ===
Child malnutrition is more common in slums than in non-slum areas. In Mumbai and New Delhi, 47% and 51% of slum children under the age of five are stunted and 35% and 36% of them are underweight. These children all suffer from third-degree malnutrition, the most severe level, according to WHO standards. A study conducted by Tada et al. in Bangkok slums illustrates that in terms of weight-forage, 25.4% of the children who participated in the survey suffered from malnutrition, compared to around 8% national malnutrition prevalence in Thailand. In Ethiopia and the Niger, rates of child malnutrition in urban slums are around 40%.

The major nutritional problems in slums are protein-energy malnutrition (PEM), vitamin A deficiency (VAD), iron deficiency anemia (IDA) and iodine deficiency disorders (IDD). Malnutrition can sometimes lead to death among children. A report by Dr. Abhay Bang states that malnutrition kills 56,000 children annually in urban slums in India.

Widespread child malnutrition in slums is closely related to family income, mothers' food practices, mothers' educational level, and maternal employment or housewifery. Poverty may result in inadequate food intake when people cannot afford to buy and store enough food, which leads to malnutrition. Another common cause is mothers' poor feeding practices, including inadequate breastfeeding and incorrect preparation of food for children. Tada et al. study explains that, in Bangkok slums, around 64% of the mothers sometimes fed their children instant food instead of a normal meal and about 70% of the mothers did not provide their children three meals every day. Mothers' lack of education leads to poor feeding as many mothers in slums do not have knowledge on food nutrition for children. Maternal employment also influences children's nutritional status. Children of mothers who work outside are prone to be malnourished. These children are likely to be neglected by their mothers or sometimes not carefully looked after by their female relatives.

=== Other non-communicable diseases ===
A multitude of non-contagious diseases also impact health for slum residents. Examples of prevalent non-infectious diseases include: cardiovascular disease, diabetes, chronic respiratory disease, neurological disorders, and mental illness. In some slum areas of India, diarrhea is a significant health problem among children. Factors like poor sanitation, low literacy rates, and limited awareness make diarrhea and other dangerous diseases extremely prevalent and burdensome on the community.

Lack of reliable data also has a negative impact on slum dwellers' health. A number of slum families do not report cases or seek professional medical care, which results in insufficient data. This might prevent appropriate allocation of health care resources in slum areas since many countries base their health care plans on data from clinic, hospital, or national mortality registry. Moreover, health service is insufficient or inadequate in most of the world's slums. Emergency ambulance service and urgent care services are typically unavailable, as health service providers sometimes avoid servicing slums. A study shows that more than half of slum dwellers are prone to visit private practitioners or seek self-medication with medicines available in the home. Private practitioners in slums are usually those who are unlicensed or poorly trained and they run clinics and pharmacies mainly for the sake of money. The categorization of slum health by the government and census data also has an effect on the distribution and allocation of health resources in inner city areas. A significant portion of city populations face challenges with access to health care but do not live in locations that are described as within the "slum" area.

Overall, a complex network of physical, social, and environmental factors contribute to the health threats faced by slum residents.

== Countermeasures ==
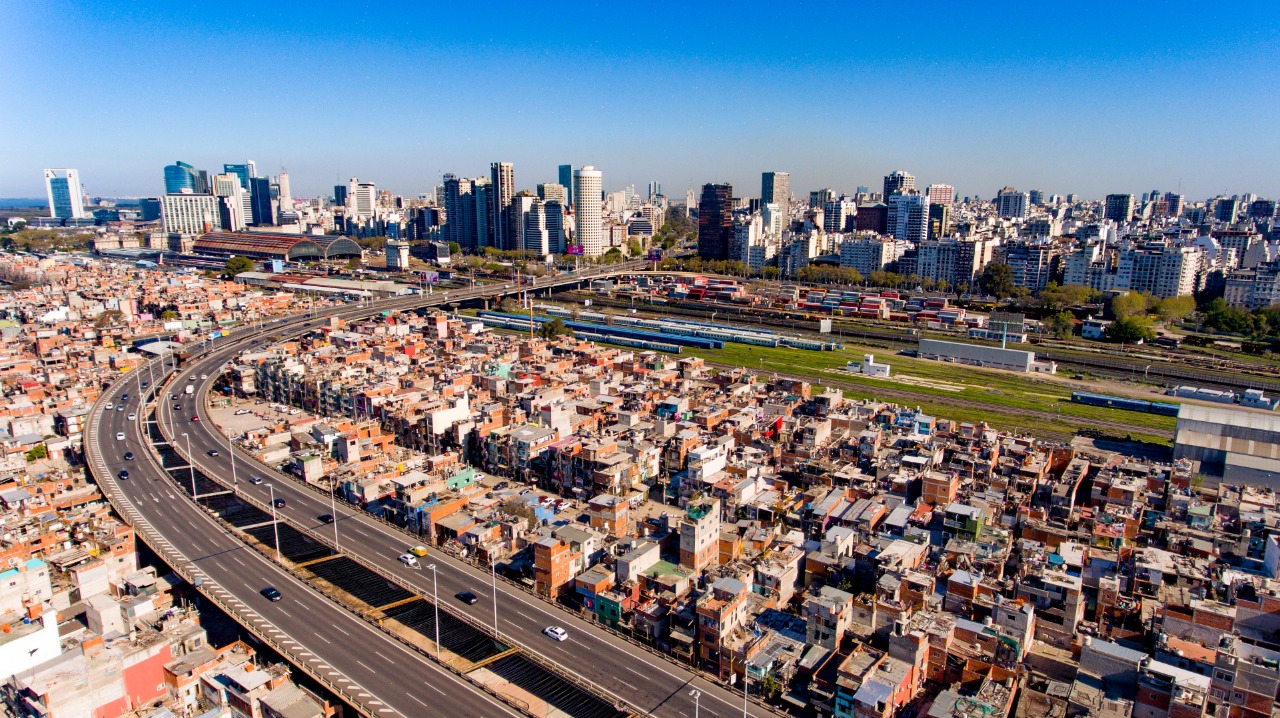
Villa 31, one of the largest slums of Argentina, located near the center of Buenos Aires

Recent years have seen a dramatic growth in the number of slums as urban populations have increased in developing countries. Nearly a billion people worldwide live in slums, and some project the figure may grow to 2 billion by 2030 if governments and the global community ignore slums and continue current urban policies. United Nations Habitat group believes change is possible.

Some NGO's are focused at addressing local problems (i.e. sanitation issues, health, ...), through the mapping out of the slums and its health services, creation of latrines, creation of local food production projects, and even microcredit projects. In one project (in Rio de Janeiro), the government even employed slum residents for the reforestation of a nearby location.

To achieve the goal of "cities without slums", the UN claims that governments must undertake vigorous urban planning, city management, infrastructure development, slum upgrading and poverty reduction.

=== Slum removal ===
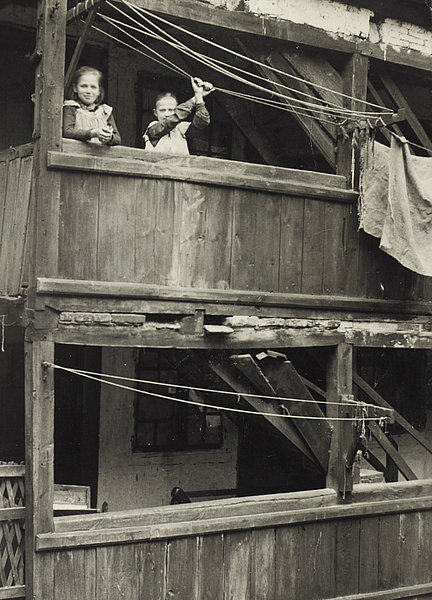
A slum dwelling in Borgergade in central Copenhagen, Denmark, about 1940. The Danish government passed The Slum Clearance Act in 1939, demolished many slums including Borgergade, replacing it with modern buildings by the early 1950s.

Some city and state officials have simply sought to remove slums. This strategy for dealing with slums is rooted in the fact that slums typically start illegally on someone else's land property, and they are not recognized by the state. As the slum started by violating another's property rights, the residents have no legal claim to the land.

Critics argue that slum removal by force tend to ignore the social problems that cause slums. The poor children as well as working adults of a city's informal economy need a place to live. Slum clearance removes the slum, but it does not remove the causes that create and maintain the slum. Policymakers, urban planners, and politicians need to take the factors that cause people to live in informal housing into consideration while tackling the issue of slums.

=== Slum relocation ===
Slum relocation strategies rely on removing the slums and relocating the slum poor to free semi-rural peripheries of cities, sometimes in free housing. An example of this is the governmental program in Morocco called Cities without Shantytowns (sometimes referred to as Cities without Slums or, in French, Villes Sans Bidonvilles), which was launched to put an end to informal housing and resettle the communities in slums into apartments.

This strategy ignores several dimensions of a slum life. The strategy sees slum as merely a place where the poor lives. In reality, slums are often integrated with every aspect of a slum resident's life, including sources of employment, distance from work, and social life. Slum relocation that displaces the poor from opportunities to earn a livelihood, generates economic insecurity in the poor. In some cases, the slum residents oppose relocation even if the replacement land and housing to the outskirts of cities is of better quality than their current house. Examples include Zone One Tondo Organization of Manila, Philippines, and Abahlali base Mjondolo of Durban, South Africa. In other cases, such as Ennakhil slum relocation project in Morocco, systematic social mediation has worked. The slum residents have been convinced that their current location is a health hazard, prone to natural disaster, or that the alternative location is well connected to employment opportunities.

=== Slum upgrading ===
Some governments have begun to approach slums as a possible opportunity to urban development by slum upgrading. This approach was inspired in part by the theoretical writings of John Turner in 1972. The approach seeks to upgrade the slum with basic infrastructure such as sanitation, safe drinking water, safe electricity distribution, paved roads, rain water drainage system, and bus/metro stops. The assumption behind this approach is that if slums are given basic services and tenure security – that is, the slum will not be destroyed and slum residents will not be evicted, then the residents will rebuild their own housing, engage their slum community to live better, and over time attract investment from government organizations and businesses. Turner argued not to demolish the housing, but to improve the environment: if governments can clear existing slums of unsanitary human waste, polluted water and litter, and from muddy unlit lanes, they do not have to worry about the shanty housing. "Squatters" have shown great organizational skills in terms of land management, and they will maintain the infrastructure that is provided.

In Mexico City for example, the government attempted to upgrade and urbanize settled slums in the periphery during the 1970s and 1980s by including basic amenities such as concrete roads, parks, illumination and sewage. Currently, most slums in Mexico City face basic characteristics of traditional slums, characterized to some extent in housing, population density, crime and poverty, however, the vast majority of its inhabitants have access to basic amenities and most areas are connected to major roads and completely urbanized. Nevertheless, smaller settlements lacking these can still be found in the periphery of the city and its inhabitants are known as "paracaidistas". A more recent example of slum-upgrading approach is PRIMED initiative in Medellín, Colombia, where streets, Metrocable transportation and other public infrastructure has been added. These slum infrastructure upgrades were combined with city infrastructure upgrade such as addition of metro, paved roads and highways to empower all city residents including the poor with reliable access throughout city.

Most slum upgrading projects, however, have produced mixed results. While initial evaluations were promising and success stories widely reported by media, evaluations done 5 to 10 years after a project completion have been disappointing. Herbert Werlin notes that the initial benefits of slum upgrading efforts have been ephemeral. The slum upgrading projects in kampungs of Jakarta, Indonesia, for example, looked promising in first few years after upgrade, but thereafter returned to a condition worse than before, particularly in terms of sanitation, environmental problems and safety of drinking water. Communal toilets provided under slum upgrading effort were poorly maintained, and abandoned by slum residents of Jakarta. Similarly slum upgrading efforts in Philippines, India and Brazil have proven to be excessively more expensive than initially estimated, and the condition of the slums 10 years after completion of slum upgrading has been slum like. The anticipated benefits of slum upgrading, claims Werlin, have proven to be a myth. There is limited but consistent evidence that slums upgrading may prevent diarrhoeal diseases and water-related expenditure.

Slum upgrading is largely a government controlled, funded and run process, rather than a competitive market driven process. Krueckeberg and Paulsen note conflicting politics, government corruption and street violence in slum regularization process is part of the reality. Slum upgrading and tenure regularization also upgrade and regularize the slum bosses and political agendas, while threatening the influence and power of municipal officials and ministries. Slum upgrading does not address poverty, low paying jobs from informal economy, and other characteristics of slums. Recent research shows that the lack of these options make residents to undertake measures to assure their working needs. One example in the northeast of Brazil, Vila S. Pedro, was mischaracterized by informal self-constructions by residents to restore working opportunities originally employed in the informal settlement. It is unclear whether slum upgrading can lead to long-term sustainable improvement to slums.

=== Urban infrastructure development and public housing ===
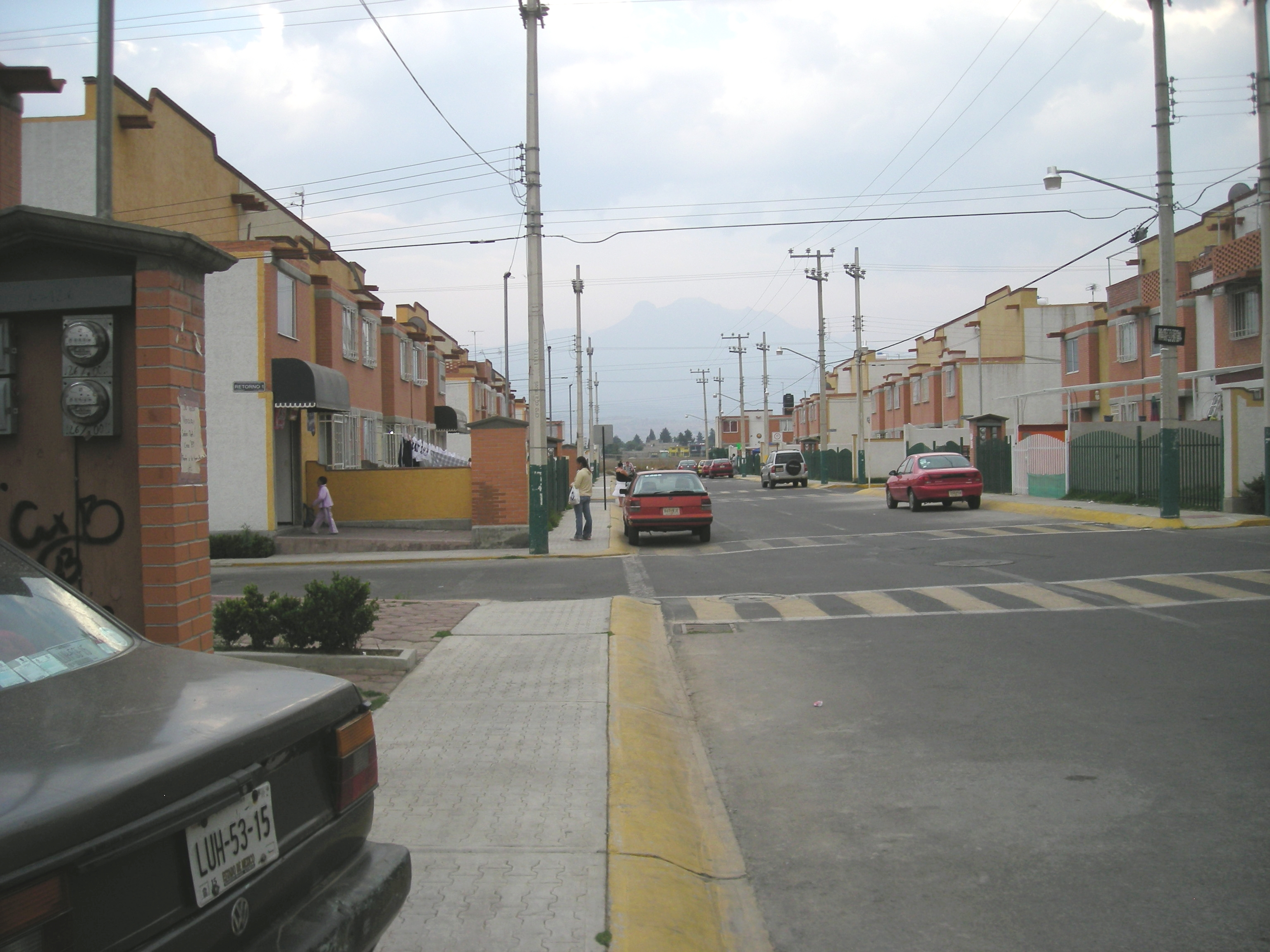
Housing projects in Chalco, Mexico

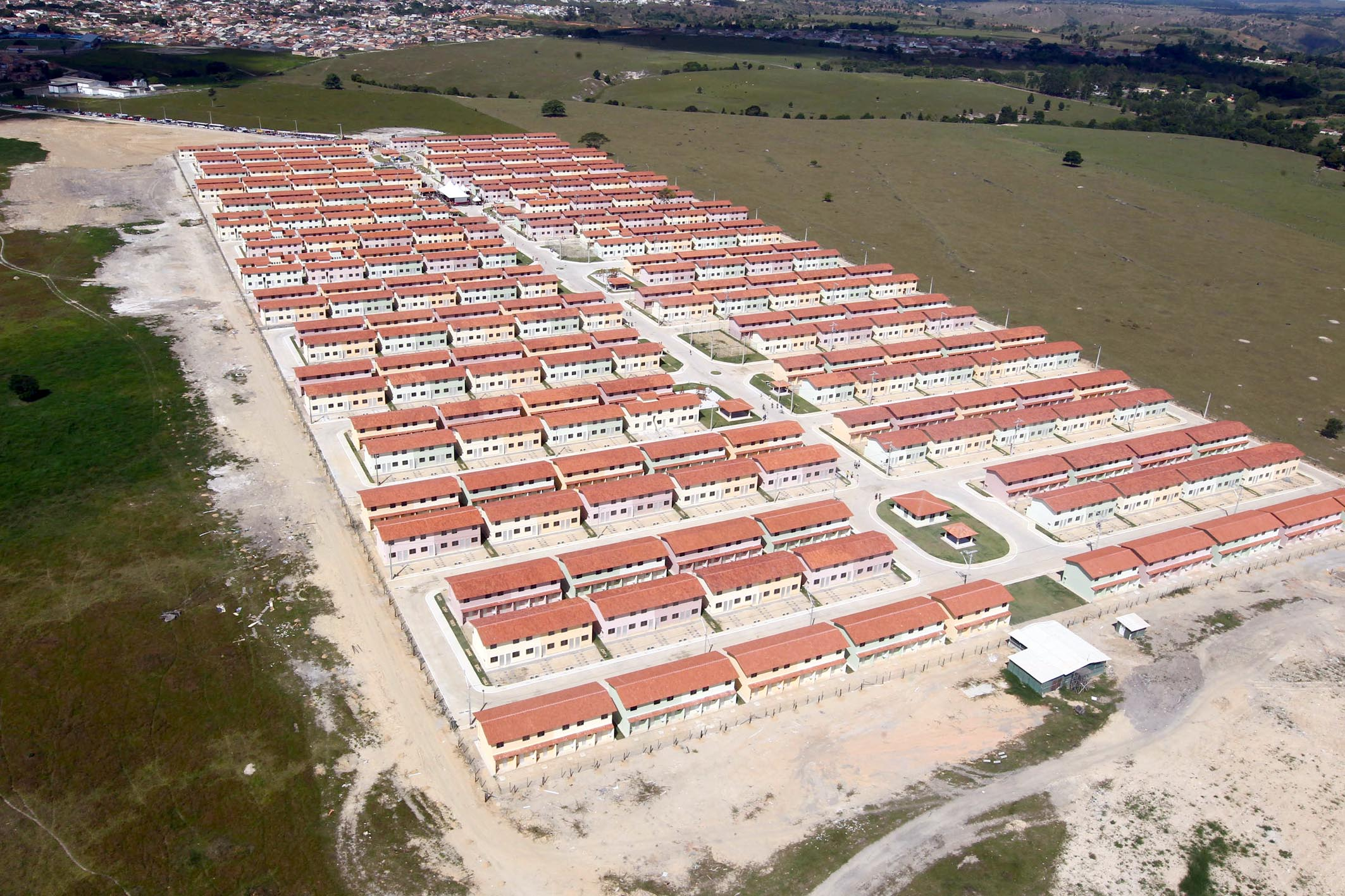
Housing projects in Eunápolis, Bahia, Brazil

Urban infrastructure such as reliable high speed mass transit systems, motorways/interstates, and public housing projects have been cited as responsible for the disappearance of major slums in the United States and Europe from the 1960s through 1970s. Charles Pearson argued in UK Parliament that mass transit would enable London to reduce slums and relocate slum dwellers. His proposal was initially rejected for lack of land and other reasons; but Pearson and others persisted with creative proposals such as building the mass transit under the major roads already in use and owned by the city. London Underground was born, and its expansion has been credited to reducing slums in respective cities (and to an extent, the New York City Subway's smaller expansion).

As cities expanded and business parks scattered due to cost ineffectiveness, people moved to live in the suburbs; thus retail, logistics, house maintenance and other businesses followed demand patterns. City governments used infrastructure investments and urban planning to distribute work, housing, green areas, retail, schools and population densities. Affordable public mass transit in cities such as New York City, London and Paris allowed the poor to reach areas where they could earn a livelihood. Public and council housing projects cleared slums and provided more sanitary housing options than what existed before the 1950s.

Slum clearance became a priority policy in Europe between 1950–1970s, and one of the biggest state-led programs. In the UK, the slum clearance effort was bigger in scale than the formation of British Railways, the National Health Service and other state programs. UK Government data suggests the clearances that took place after 1955 demolished about 1.5 million slum properties, resettling about 15% of UK's population out of these properties. Similarly, after 1950, Denmark and others pursued parallel initiatives to clear slums and resettle the slum residents.

The US and European governments additionally created a procedure by which the poor could directly apply to the government for housing assistance, thus becoming a partner to identifying and meeting the housing needs of its citizens. One historically effective approach to reduce and prevent slums has been citywide infrastructure development combined with affordable, reliable public mass transport and public housing projects.

However, slum relocation in the name of urban development is criticized for uprooting communities without consultation or consideration of ongoing livelihood. For example, the Sabarmati Riverfront Project, a recreational development in Ahmedabad, India, forcefully relocated over 19,000 families from shacks along the river to 13 public housing complexes that were an average of 9 km away from the family's original dwelling.

== Prevalence ==
Percent urban population of a country living in slums (UN Habitat, 2005)

Urban population living in slums, 2014.

Slums exist in many countries and have become a global phenomenon. A UN-Habitat report states that in 2006 there were nearly 1 billion people settling in slum settlements in most cities of Central America, Asia, South America and Africa, and a smaller number in the cities of Europe and North America.

In 2012, according to UN-Habitat, about 863 million people in the developing world lived in slums. Of these, the urban slum population at mid-year was around 213 million in Sub-Saharan Africa, 207 million in East Asia, 201 million in South Asia, 113 million in Latin America and Caribbean, 80 million in Southeast Asia, 36 million in West Asia, and 13 million in North Africa. Among individual countries, the proportion of urban residents living in slum areas in 2009 was highest in the Central African Republic (95.9%), Chad (89.3%), Niger (81.7%), and Mozambique (80.5%).

The distribution of slums within a city varies throughout the world. In most of the developed countries, it is easier to distinguish the slum-areas and non-slum areas. In the United States, slum dwellers are usually in city neighborhoods and inner suburbs, while in Europe, they are more common in high rise housing on the urban outskirts. In many developing countries, slums are prevalent as distributed pockets or as urban orbits of densely constructed informal settlements.

In some cities, especially in countries in South Asia and Sub-Saharan Africa, slums are not just marginalized neighborhoods holding a small population; slums are widespread, and are home to a large part of urban population. These are sometimes called slum cities.

The percentage of developing world's urban population living in slums has been dropping with economic development, even while total urban population has been increasing. In 1990, 46 percent of the urban population lived in slums; by 2000, the percentage had dropped to 39%; which further dropped to 32% by 2010.

== See also ==
- List of slums
- Informal waste collection

=== Variations of impoverished settlements ===
- Banlieue (Term used for the deprived neighbourhoods in the edges or around the French cities)
- Barrio (slums in Venezuela)
- Campamento (slums in Chile)
- Favela (slums in Brazil)
- Gecekondu (slums in Turkey)
- Ghetto
- Hooverville (slums in 1930s US)
- Inner city
- Komboni (slums in Zambia)
- Pueblos jóvenes (slums in Peru)
- Refugee shelter
- Romani People camp
- Rooftop slum
- Rookery (slums in London, United Kingdom)
- Shanty town
- Skid row
- Tent city
- Trailer park
- Urban village (China)
- Villa miseria (slums in Argentina)
