= Informal waste collection =

Informal waste collection is the activity of "manually sorting and extracting various recyclable and reusable materials from mixed waste, at legal and illegal dumpsites, on top of or under piles of waste, in bins, at various transfer points, in transport trucks or elsewhere". When this activity is carried out in bins, the term "scavenging" is used. This activity is one way of collecting waste, the other ways consisting of collecting it at source (before it is mixed with other waste) or collecting it in an organised way (through the waste disposal centres).

This activity is often unhealthy, often risky, sometimes even prohibited depending on the location. Moreover, the way society views people who collect waste informally is often depreciatory: with the exception of a few cases of people doing it for scientific or artistic purposes or for DIY. It is usually only practised by those who have few other options, for example slum dwellers in developing countries. It is part of the informal economy.

While it is difficult to know exactly how many people are engaged in this activity, estimates range from 2 to 6 million people worldwide.

== History ==
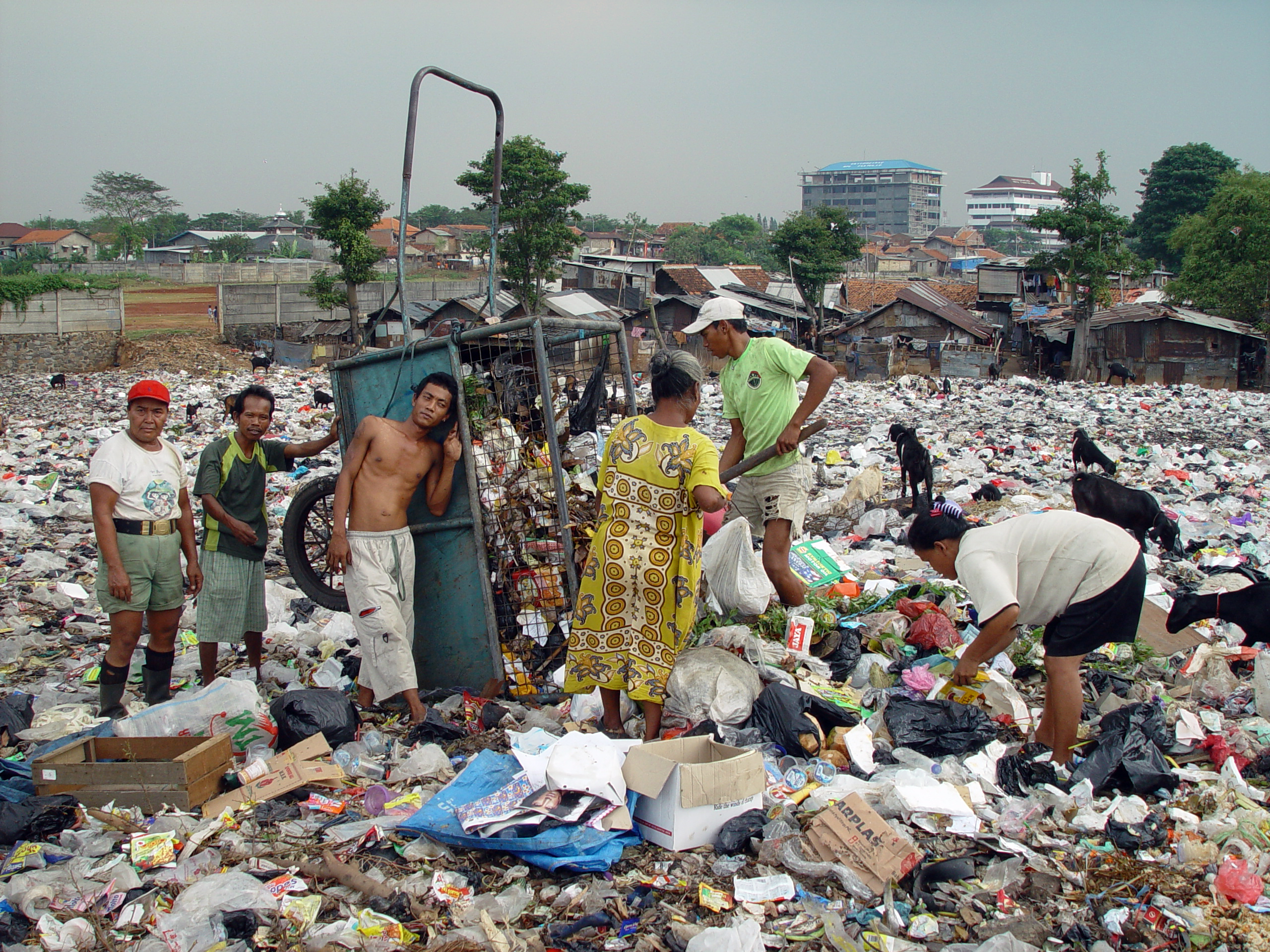
Waste pickers at a landfill in Jakarta, Indonesia

The ragpicker's trade was known in Europe, particularly in France and Italy, until the 1960s. There are municipalities, for example Gambettola in northern Italy, where the inhabitants have made a fortune from the recovery of old things and perpetuate this ancient profession by recovering metals for the steel industry.

== Vocabulary ==
There are several expressions in French for this activity and the people who practice it, although English is frequently used in the "development field. English scavenging and scavenger (originally applied to animals to designate scavengers) is often considered too pejorative, while the word "rag picker", still commonly used, is too restrictive as it refers only to the recovery of fabric. The word waste pickers is currently the most widely used in studies or "rubbish collector" (sometimes adding the "informal adjective" to distinguish them from professional waste collectors). "Rubbish" is also used instead of "waste".

There are also many local names or nicknames, which are sometimes preferred: for example, we speak of zabbālīn ("garbage men", in literary Arabic) in Egypt, cartoneros in Argentina, chifonye in Haiti, kacharawala in Delhi, tokai in Bangladesh, kabaris in Karachi, pepenadores in Mexico, basuriegos in Colombia, catadores in Brazil, boujouman in Senegal, pemulung in Indonesia...: these names often refer to the main materials (cardboard, rags...) that are recovered.

== Types of waste collected and their uses ==
The waste collected is globally of three main types: for short term subsistence, for possible refurbishment and resale, and finally for "diverted" use of a creative or scientific nature.

- Waste with immediate reuse: this is generally edible waste, such as leftover food, products that have been thrown away because they are past their expiration date but still good; these products are intended to be consumed soon afterwards. They are found around markets, or in supermarkets and restaurants in developed countries.
- Waste for resale: many discarded items can be given a market value at low cost, thus providing a means of livelihood, which is essential in places where poverty is widespread and unemployment high. This type of use creates work in its own right, and remains the dominant form of recovery in developing countries.
- Waste for "professional" use: this case remains extremely marginal compared to the other two; it concerns in particular the collection of waste made "for the thrill", for an artistic creation, for a sociological study or for a survey.

In addition to these three uses, waste can have other uses. In flood-prone areas, waste can be used as fill if no other material is immediately available: for example, in the areas of Cap-Haitien built on mangrove swamps, 50% of the soil is made up of domestic waste. The waste is also used to form makeshift dikes against high tides and waves.

Illustration of the different possible uses of the recovered waste

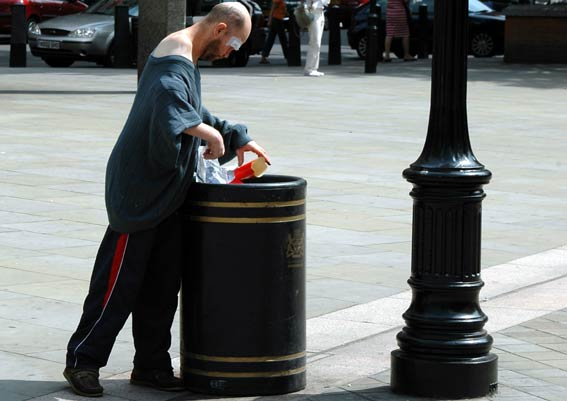
Man searching a London rubbish bin for food.

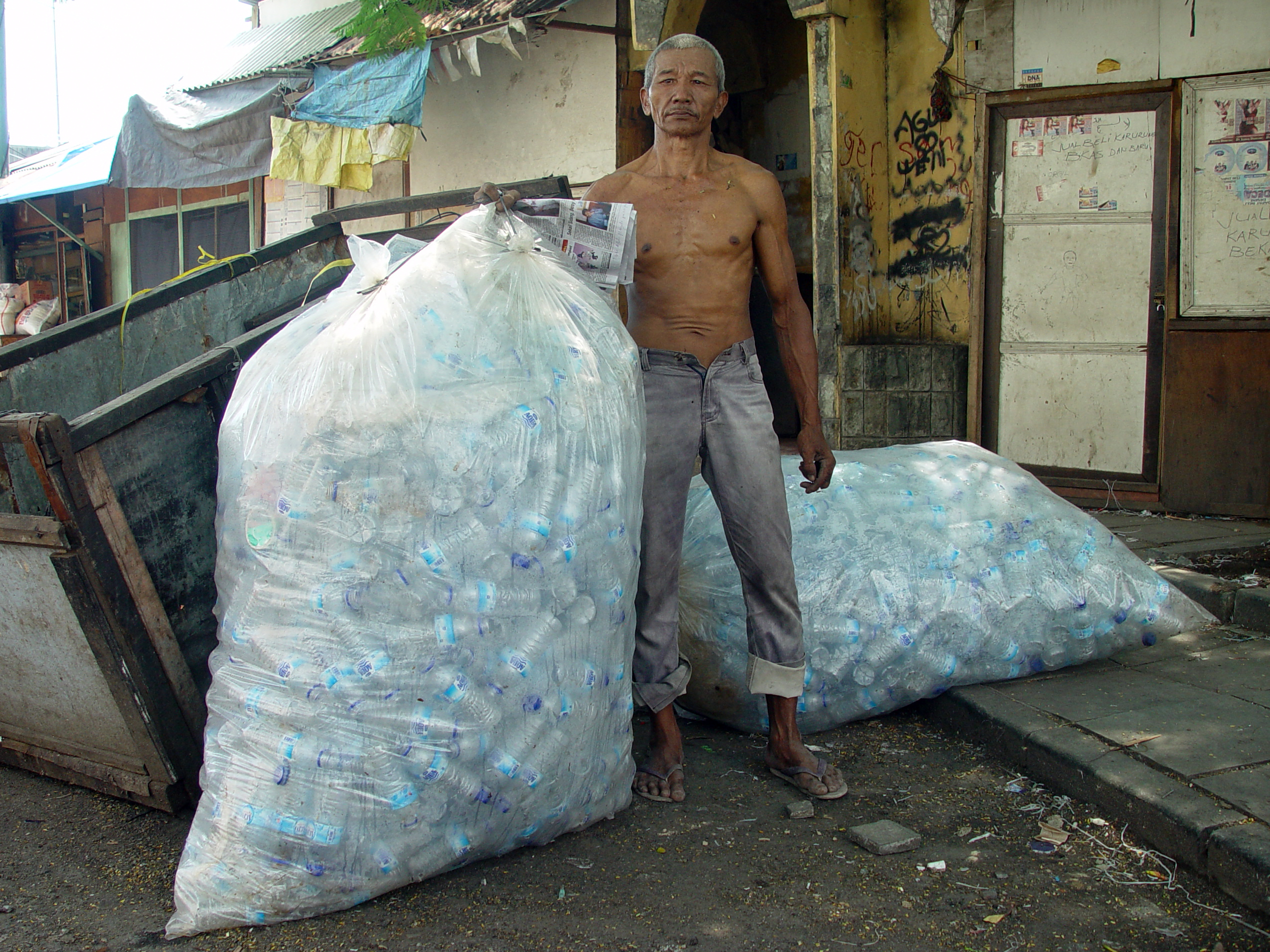
Plastic bottles collected by a Jakarta resident for resale.

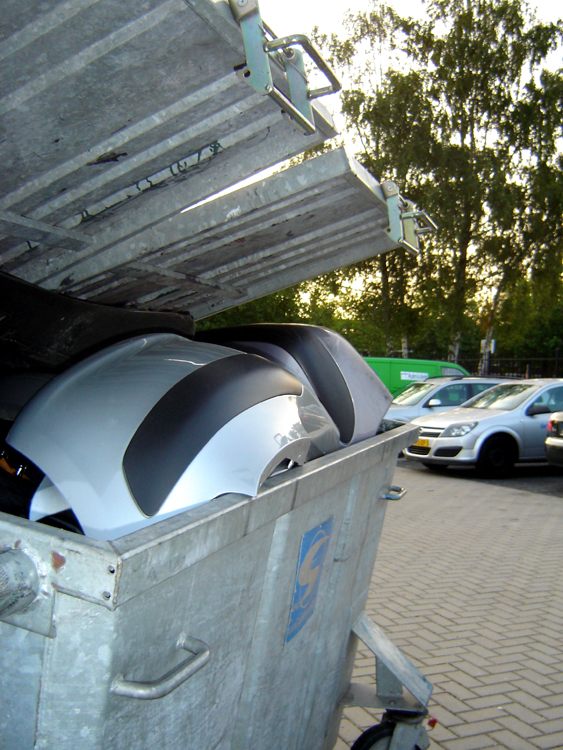
Waste bin in a car workshop, containing potentially valuable items.

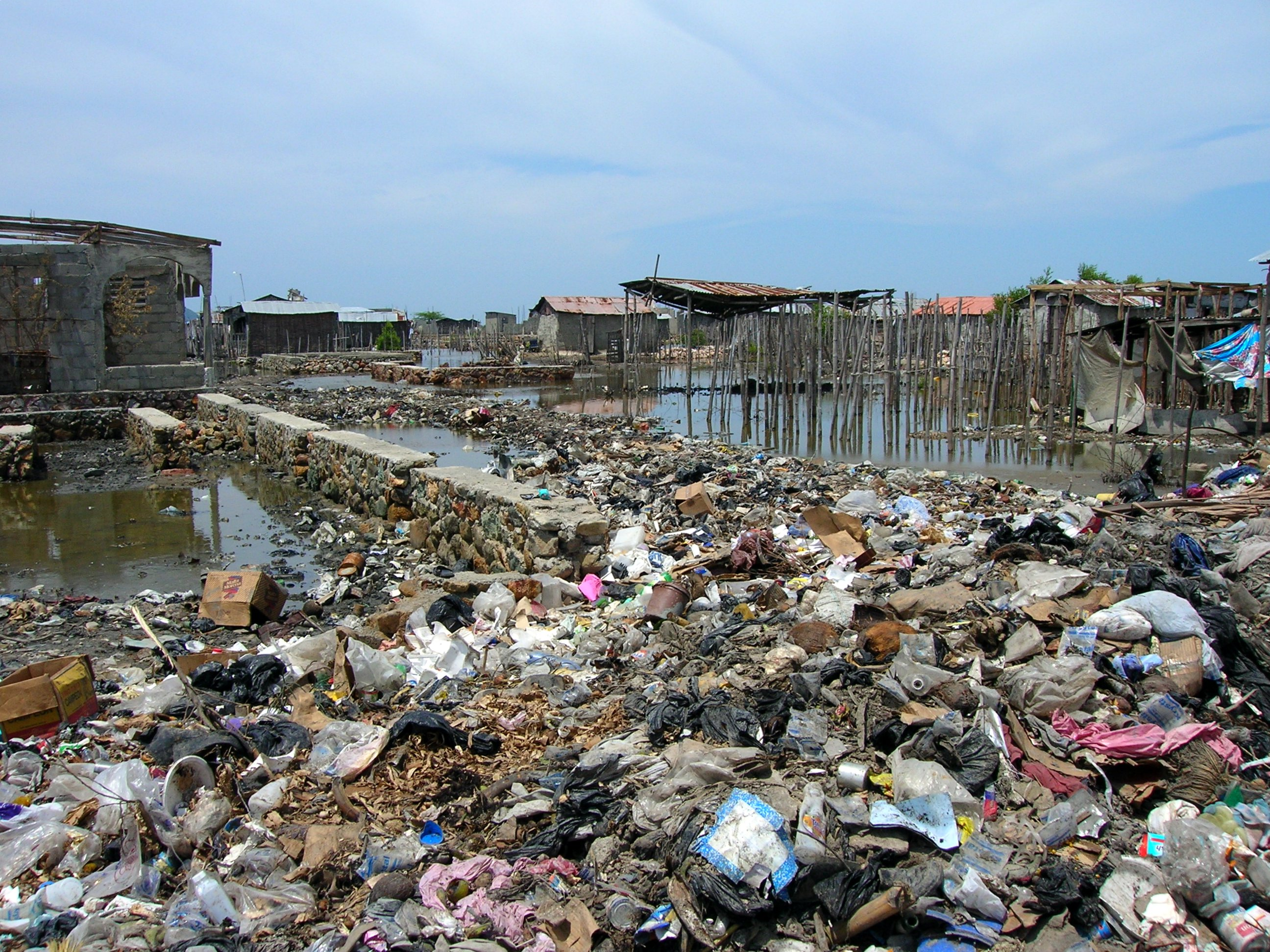
Solid waste bought back from collection trucks to create fill for a road in Cap-Haitien.

== Activities ==
While collection is the most visible activity (as it is often the most shocking image), it is not the only activity involved in recovery. These activities include collection (at source, on the streets and in landfills), recovery and/or transformation, buy-back and resale. At this point, what was waste finds its way back into the formal economy or industry as recycled material.

=== Activity description ===
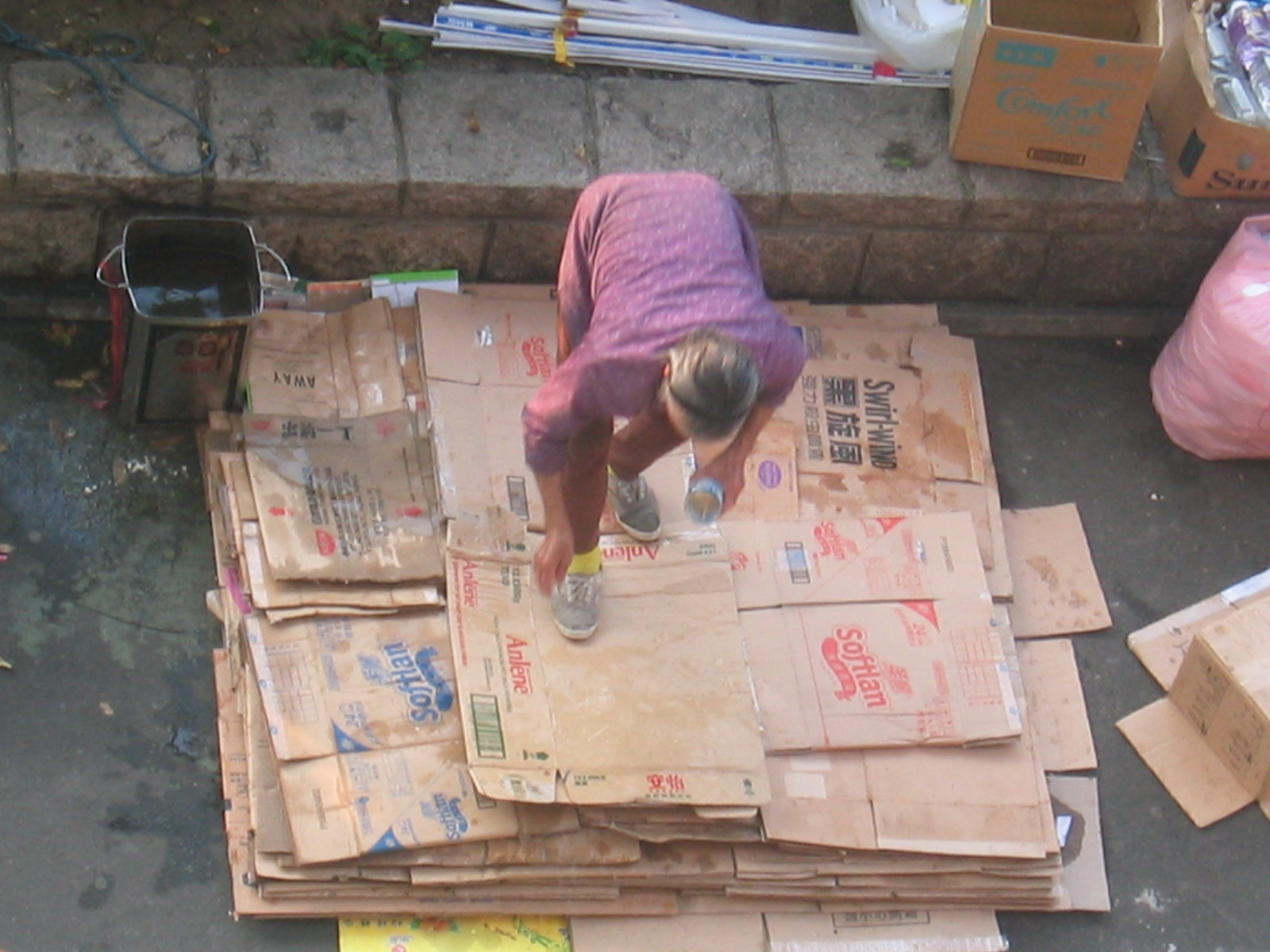
A Hong Kong woman wets cardboard to increase its weight and thus its market value: an example of valorisation.

Collection can take place at different points. Upstream collectors may buy back waste from households, allowing them to obtain less soiled waste; this practice is common in areas of a city not served by public services. Some collectors are paid for this, if they ensure that all waste is removed. Collection can also be made from community dumpsters or on the streets, particularly around markets. Finally, a preferred location is a public waste dump, given the abundance of waste. Depending on the dump and the involvement of the municipalities, access may be free or restricted to certain hours, to authorised persons, or even to the payment of a fee. People who charge this fee may also be part of the system, often as resellers.

Sorting can be done at the same time as collection or once the items have been sold to an intermediary. It allows for the separation of what will be reused from what is definitely to be thrown away.

Recovery is the process of adding value to waste; it can be as simple as cleaning or repairing an object, allowing it to be resold directly. Beyond recovery, transformation is similar to recycling by reusing the materials of the object for something else: for example, the recovery of fabric to make clothes or curtains; remelting metal to make objects that do not need good quality; trinkets made from recycled paper and plastic.

Finally, resale allows the objects to be reintroduced into the traditional economic circuit. This resale can be done on the street by the collector himself, in an organised way by a shop, or with industries in the case of raw materials.

=== Tools ===
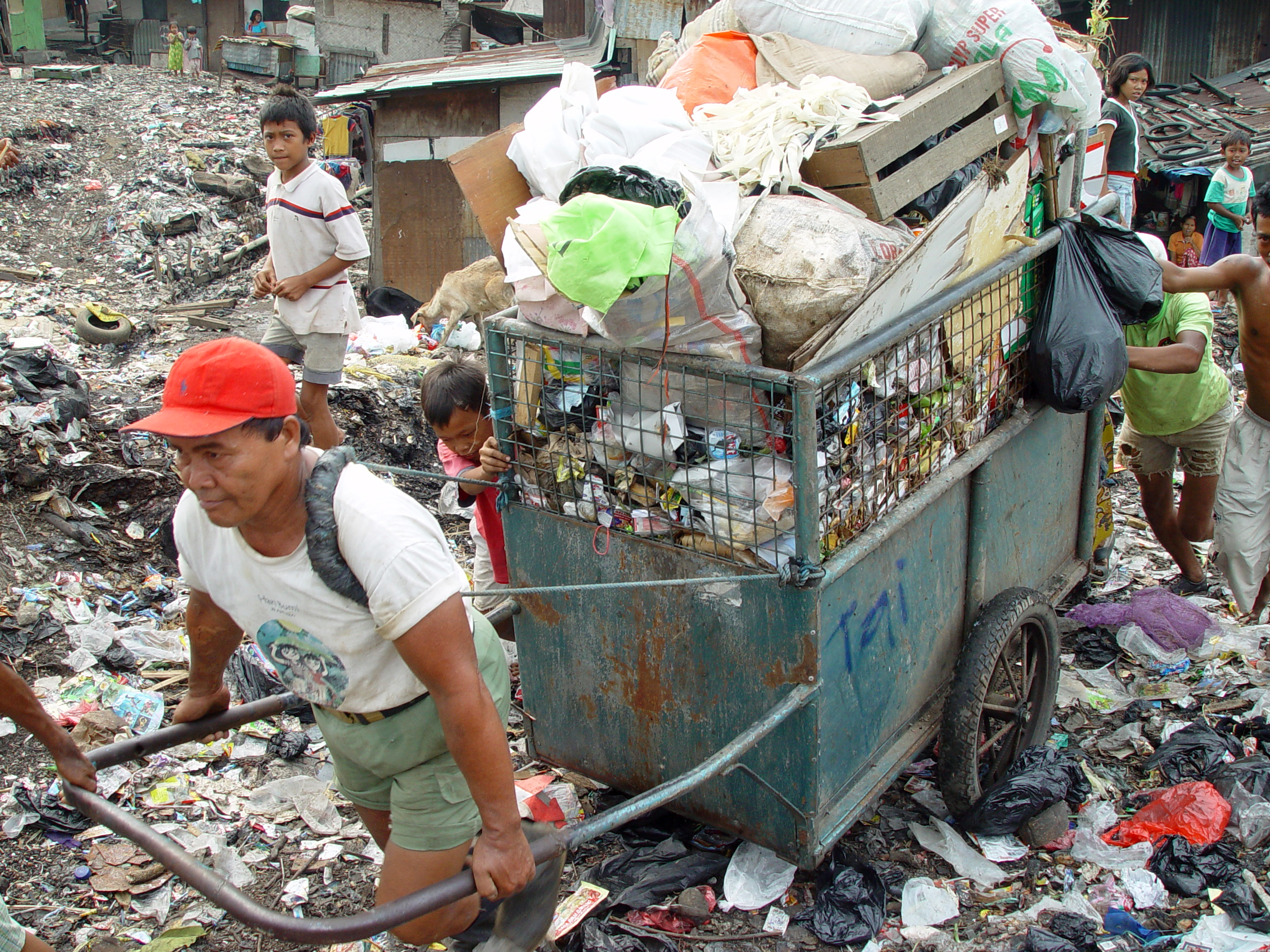
Collectors using a cart

Most collectors use only two tools: a metal tip or hook to turn the waste over, and a plastic bag to collect it. The use of vehicles such as the cart shown here seems to be reserved for organised groups given their prohibitive cost. Protective equipment is very rare; when it is present, it is often the result of action by a local or international organisation.

== Global situation ==
=== Statistics ===
Since the majority of waste pickers work in the informal sector, it is difficult to establish the precise number of pickers worldwide. It is possible to consult field assessments that give an idea of the proportions in some major cities (see table below); globally, hundreds of thousands, if not millions, of people make a living from this activity. In large cities in developing countries, a 1988 estimate puts informal waste collection at 2% of the population, potentially 1.6 million people in least developed countries alone and 6.35 million people in low- and middle-income countries. (Note: This figure is obtained by taking 2% of the population of cities with more than 1 million inhabitants in low-income countries, i.e. 2% of 12% of 686.5 million inhabitants, according to World Bank data. If we also take the population of cities with more than 1 million inhabitants in countries with lower middle income, we add 2% of 18% of 1,320 million people. http://devdata.worldbank.org/wdipdfs/table3_10.pdf) If, on the other hand, we use the rate of 6 ‰ of the population that frequently appears in the table below, the estimated number of informal reclaimers would be 490,000 in the least developed countries, and 1.92 million in all low and lower-middle income countries.

Estimates of the number of informal reclaimers in some major cities around the world.Where no source is specified, this is an ILO result
Country	City	Total population (2004)	Informal collectors (estimation)		
Country	City	Total population (2004)	Total	‰	Of which children (-18 years)
Asia
Bangladesh	Dacca	10.4 millions	65 000	6.3	
Cambodia	Phnom Penh	1.2 million	330 (dumpsites)	0.27	246 (dumpsites)
India	Bangalore	6 millions	20 000 - 30 000 12 000	3.3 - 5 2	24% of street children
India	Delhi	14 millions	100 000 15 000	7.1 1.07	
India	Kolkata	15 millions	50 000 20 000 - 25 000	3.3 1.3 - 1.7	30 - 40%
India	Mumbai	18.1 millions	100 000 70 000	5.5 3.9	
India	Pune	3.75 millions	10 000	2.7	
Pakistan	Karachi	14 millions	15 000 (streets) 21 000 (dumpsites)	1.07 1.5	
Indonesia	Jakarta	8.8 millions	37 000	4.2	
Philippines	Manila	> 10 millions	20 000 (dumpsites)	2	
Philippines	Quezon City	2.2 millions	13 000 (dumpsites)	5.9	1 500 (dumpsites)
Vietnam	Ho Chi Minh city	7.4 millions	7 500	1.01	
Vietnam	Hanoï	3.1 millions	12 000	3.9	1 000
Africa
Egypt	Cairo	18 millions	70 000 30 000	3.89 1.67	2 500 (streets)
Kenya	Whole country	34.7 millions	45 000	1.3	
Tanzania	Dar es Salam	2.5 millions	600 - 700	0.25	50 - 100
Americas
Argentina	Buenos Aires	12.4 millions	80 000	6.45	
Brazil	Whole country	180 millions			45 000
Colombia	Bogota	6 millions	> 10 000	1.67	
Colombia	Whole country	45 millions	50 000	1.11	
Mexico	Mexico City	18 millions	15 000	0.83	
Europe
Romania	Cluj-Napoca	330 000	800 (dumpsites) 1 000 (streets)	2.4 3.0	150 - 200
Romania	Baia Mare	136 000	200	1.47	
Romania	Whole country	22.2 millions	35 000 - 50 000	1.58 - 2.25	

=== Revenue ===
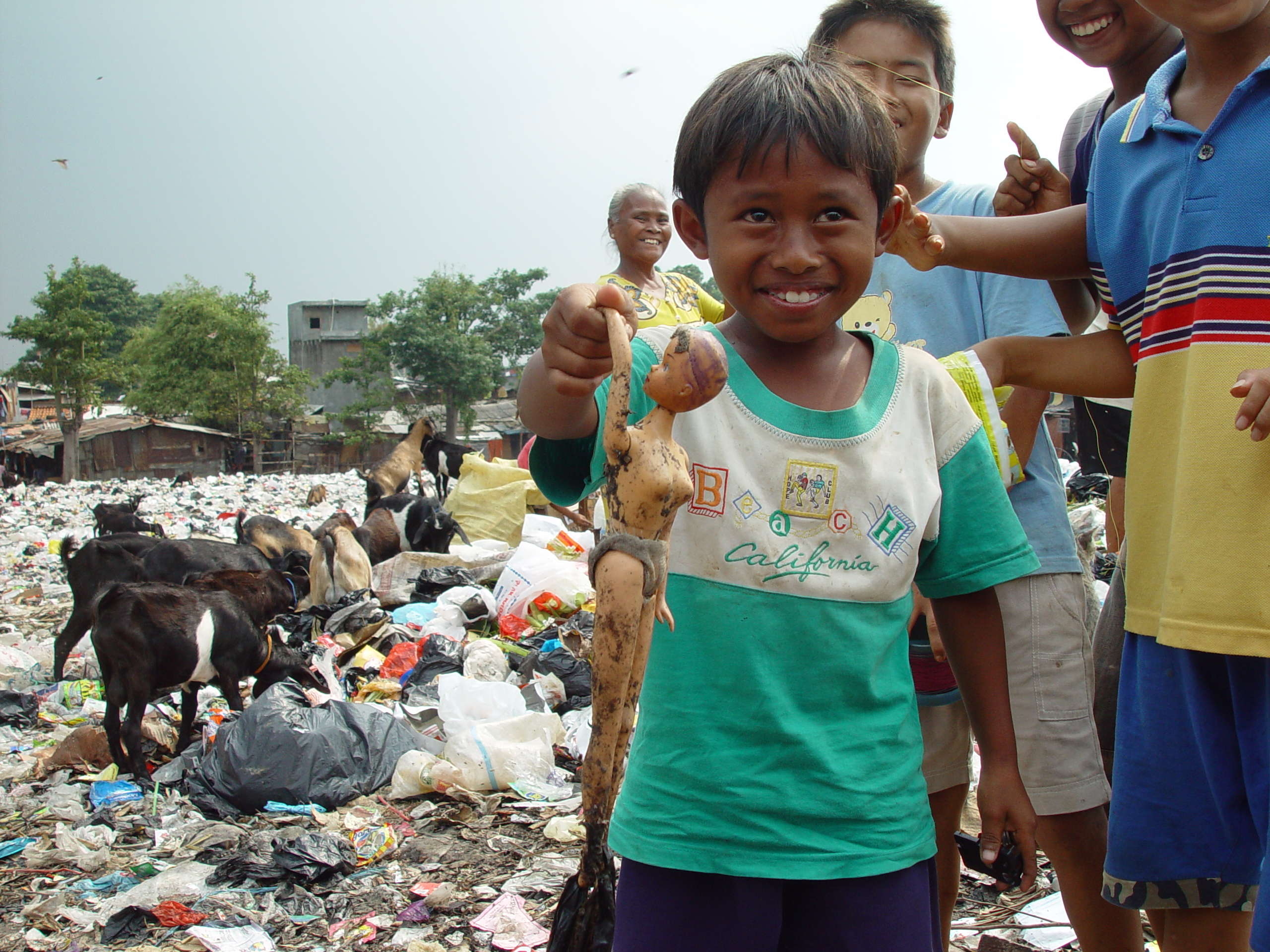
A child who has just found a doll, earning the admiration of her peers.

If waste collection comes from a situation of great poverty and lack of resources, the collectors are not the poorest of the inhabitants; they are found among beggars or isolated elderly people. The income of waste pickers is paradoxically often above the poverty threshold of US$1/day and may even exceed the country's minimum income: In Romania, a teenager earned an average of 125-300 euros per month when the minimum wage was $70; in Dar es Salaam, an adult scavenger earned an average of US$55 per month in 2004 when the minimum wage was US$45; in Latin America, their income can be three times the minimum wage. However, children earn less than adults: a teenager usually earns 50% of what an adult can expect, while the income of young children (under 12) is between 10% and 25% of an adult's income.

However, children earn less than adults: a teenager usually earns 50% of what an adult can expect, while the income of young children (under 12) is between 10% and 25% of an adult's income. On the other hand, children often contribute significantly to the family income, in the order of 30-40% in Calcutta, which may discourage parents from sending them to school. Women also earn less than men, who more often work at night and predominate in higher-paid work (truck drivers, larger-scale dealers); however, this activity can be a way for women to earn an independent income and thus escape poverty.

=== Motivations ===
The motivations behind this activity vary between adults and children. For adults, the main reasons are the lack of alternative work (often due to low levels of education and/or discrimination), the need for a higher income and the flexibility it offers in working hours and location. The reasons are more diverse for children, and may include:

- parents' inability to work (disability, illness, alcoholism...); children may also feel responsible for the family;
- the lack of accessible schools, the unattractiveness of schools or the cost of school fees, the low importance attached to education;
- rubbish collection is seen as a standard of living, or a dump is located next to the place of living;
- children are considered more alert to sort and collect rubbish; they are paid less, and meanwhile they don't need a place to leave them while the parents work;
- Children's work is seen as "normal" (as are other activities: selling water, helping bus drivers, etc.), or children are expected to participate in the family's activities;
- little education offers no alternative.

Hunger remains a strong motivation for scavenging, as this activity is less dangerous than theft. The writer Jean Ziegler writes about scavenging for food in L'Empire de la honte (The Empire of Shame). Visiting the Brasilia garbage dump, he observes children and teenagers sorting and placing rubbish in carts, under the supervision of a feitor (foreman). Some of the carts contain paper, others cardboard, metal parts, glass shards.

"Most of the carts carry food [...] a kind of smelly, colourless mush. In the tubs are mixed flour, rice, sloppy vegetables, pieces of meat, fish heads, bones - and sometimes the corpse of a rabbit or a rat. Most of the tubs have a terrible smell".

"I ask the "feitor" for whom the contents of the tubs are intended. I slip him a ten reais note. "I'm not a tourist. I'm the UN Special Rapporteur on the Right to Food... I want to know what's going on here," I said, in a ridiculously solemn voice. The "feitor" doesn't care about my mission. But he is sensitive to the banknote. "Our children are hungry, understand," he says, as if to excuse them".

— Jean Ziegler

=== Sociology ===
The proportion of women among collectors is 38 per cent in Phnom Penh or 60 per cent in Hanoi, and more often around 50 per cent, although these figures are often only for collectors and not for dealers. Waste collection particularly involves child labour. According to the study cited above, children may account for more than half of the reclaimers; their ages ranged from 4-5 years to 18 years. Minorities are often over-represented among collectors, whether religious or ethnic minorities: Coptic Christians make up more than half of the collectors in Egypt, as do Muslims in Kolkata; in Romania, it is mostly Roma, in India untouchables. They may also be foreigners, such as Syrians and Palestinians in Lebanon, Afghans in Pakistan or Bangladeshis in Delhi. There are also many new migrants from the countryside or fleeing from disaster, although they do not belong to clear minorities.

== Place in waste management ==
The diagram below shows a typical management system in a large city in a developing country: some waste is collected in a formal and structured way by local public services: collection at source, street cleaning, transport and final treatment. Some waste is often not collected and remains in the streets and canals: (Note: Dans certains pays les moins avancés, moins de 30 % des déchets sont collectés par les pouvoirs publics, laissant plusieurs centaines de tonnes de déchets chaque jour dans les rues.) it is often burnt as soon as it takes up too much space. Finally, some waste is collected informally, at source, in the streets or in dumps.

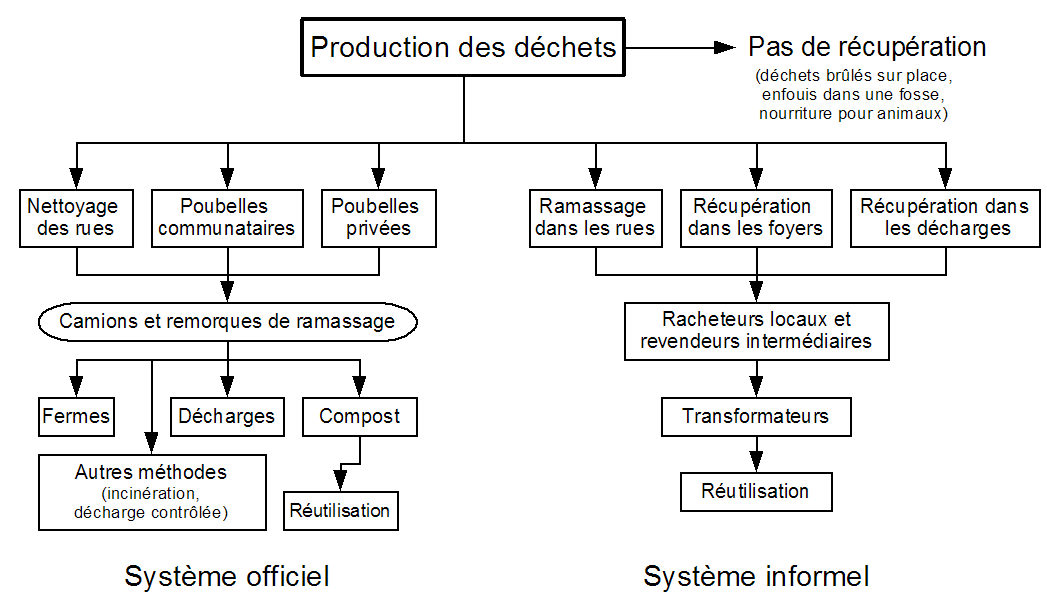
Waste management system in a developing country

The collection does not stop there. The waste is then sold to intermediaries who either resell it directly or process it: cleaning, adding value, separating materials, etc., after which it is resold. Informal recovery thus contributes to recycling and thus to the waste management system. The volume of waste recovered is far from negligible: in Romania as a whole, 1-2% of recyclable waste is recovered informally, with recyclable waste making up 36% of the total. In Bangalore, 15% of municipal waste is collected in this way each day; in Cairo, between 30 and 40% of all waste is collected, or 900 tonnes each day. Since waste management can account for up to 30% of the municipal budget, as in Karachi, informal waste collection also allows the city to reduce its waste management costs.

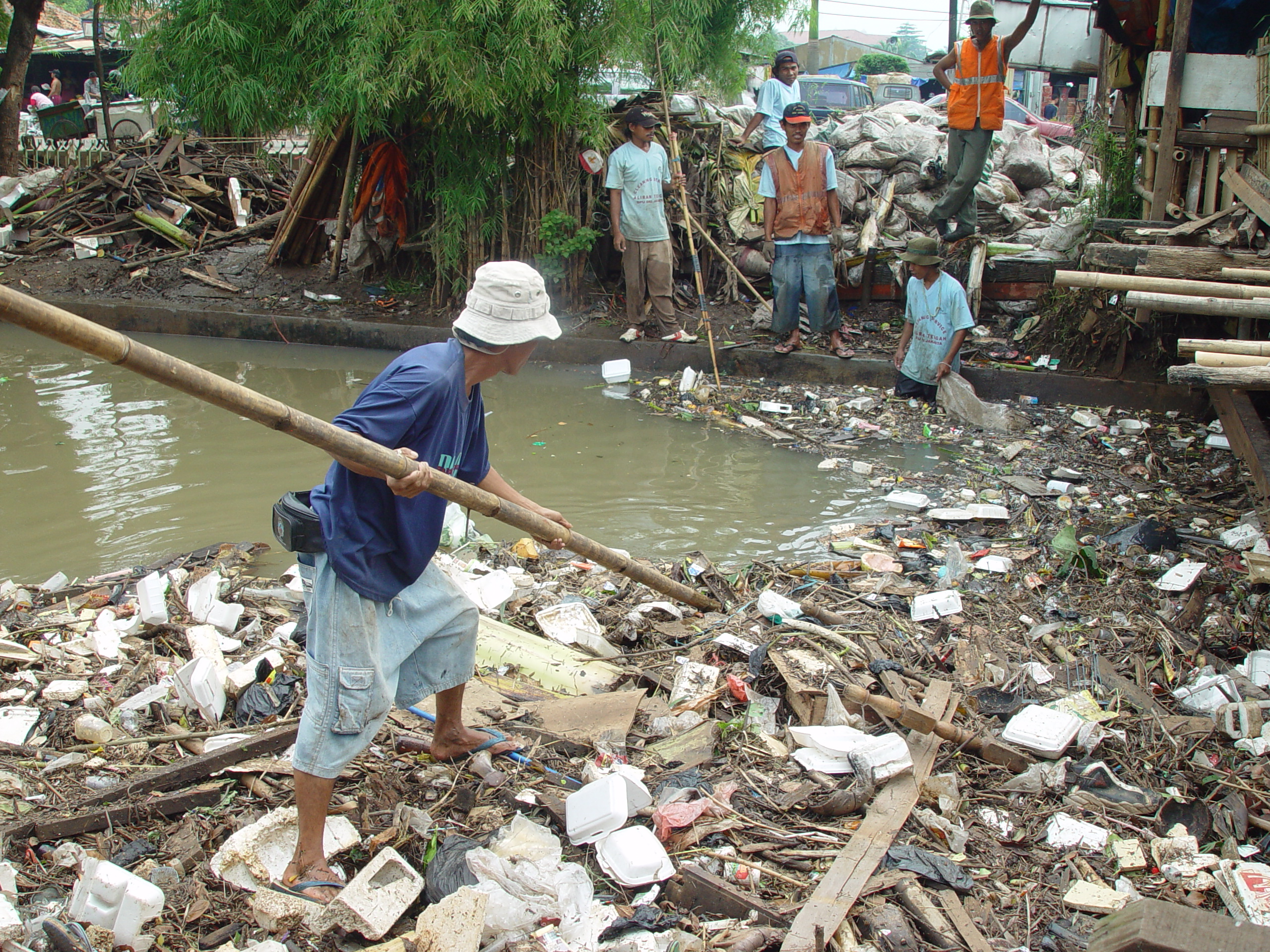
Collectors are involved in waste management: here, unblocking a drainage channel that is in danger of overflowing with rubbish.

The waste management literature for developing countries includes informal collectors at several levels: first, to understand what proportion of waste is already being collected by them; and second, to study how a waste management programme would affect their livelihoods, either positively (by improving sanitation) or negatively (by reducing their source of income).

However, while it is tempting for a municipality to want to get rid of informal reclaimers in order to improve the image of the city, some successful initiatives have been carried out in collaboration with them. In 1992, only 2-5% of the 1,300 tonnes of waste produced daily in Dar es Salaam was collected. In 2004, the city generated 2,200 tonnes of waste per day, 50% was collected and 40% went to an open dump; the collectors were included in the public-private partnership in order to be able to serve a larger proportion of the city, while improving their living conditions. Collectors' associations are also officially recognised.

Such initiatives remain rare: to date, only a handful of municipalities have integrated waste pickers into their waste management programmes, including Belo Horizonte in Brazil, some cities in India and the Philippines.

== Living conditions ==
=== Risks ===
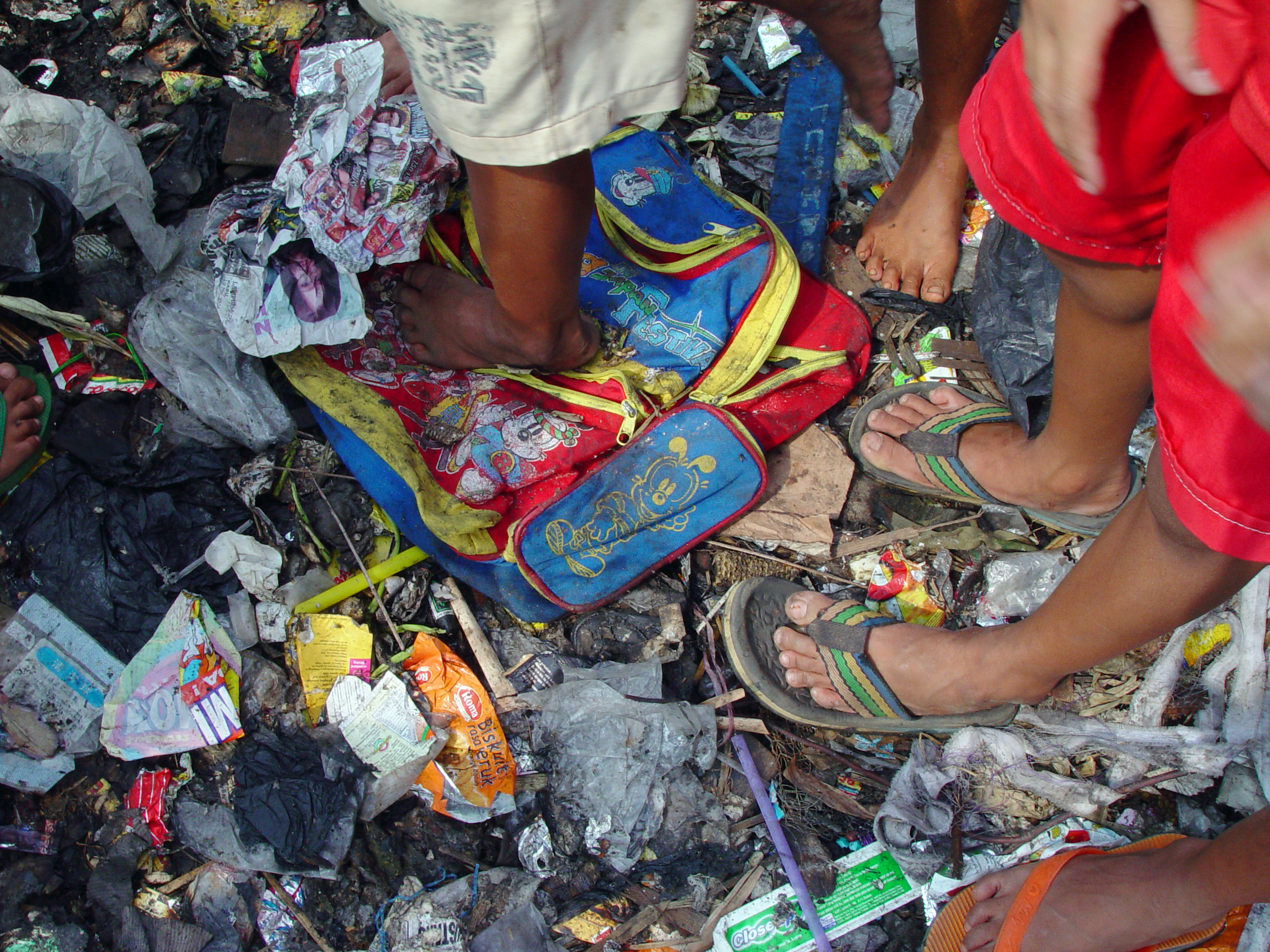
Children in bare feet or flip-flops on a rubbish dump.

The collection of waste from landfills and the actual handling of the waste creates health risks and physical hazards for the collectors. Parasitic diseases are common among collectors (65% incidence in Bangkok and 97% in Olinda); the high density of particles (up to 25 times higher than in residential areas) leads to lung problems: 40% of collectors affected at one site in Thailand, 53% of children at one site in the Philippines. Heavy metals also affect health: at one Philippine site, 70% of child collectors had abnormally high blood lead levels, 2.5 times higher than other children in the slums. Diseases that particularly affect the pickers include tuberculosis, intestinal diseases and diarrhoea, skin problems such as scabies, pneumonia and bronchitis, eye infections, etc.

The dangers are also physical: the poverty of the collectors does not usually allow them to have adequate protective equipment. People walking in flip-flops or even barefoot are exposed to cuts from sharp objects, infection from medical waste (especially syringes), animal bites and insect stings. The weight of the materials creates recurrent back problems. The instability of the waste increases the risk of fractures, the rise of toxic gases can trap a collector, and landslides can be fatal: 39 deaths in Istanbul in 1993, more than 200 in Manila in 2000 when waste collapsed, (Note: On July 10, 2000, following heavy rains, an entire mountain of rubbish collapsed at the Payatas landfill in Manila. 200 people died buried under the rubbish, mostly relatively elderly women and those who were less mobile. Source: Stephanie Lepsoe, op cit.) some 250 people evacuated in O Portiño (Spain) in 1994. Fires are common, both intentional and unintentional.

Health risks are also extended to the neighbourhood by animals feeding on the waste (and serving as food for the inhabitants themselves) and by the dispersal of waste. In addition, the lack of basic infrastructure, particularly latrines, leads many people to use the piles of waste as toilets, leading to increased contamination.

This activity is sometimes considered illegal, in which case the collectors have to fear the police. But whether the activity is legal or not, the sector remains mostly informal and does not provide any social coverage, except for isolated initiatives in some slums to offer a minimum of protection during difficult times. Given the high proportion of women and children in the sector (especially street children, who are often orphans), there is also a greater vulnerability to the risk of forced prostitution by dealers (see also: child exploitation). Their position at the bottom of the social hierarchy sometimes makes them seen as criminals: in Colombia, during the "social cleansing" campaigns of the paramilitary groups, waste collectors were considered "disposable": 40 bodies were found in 1992, and it is estimated that around 2,000 basuriegos were killed until 1994.

As a result, their life expectancy is still lower than that of the rest of the population: those in Mexico City have a life expectancy of 39 years compared to 67 years for the rest of the population.

=== Vulnerability ===
Like other slum dwellers and marginalised people, waste pickers are among the population most vulnerable to shocks: vulnerability to illness (which does not allow one to earn a salary for several days in a row), to natural and not-so-natural disasters (such as fires), to unforeseen expenses (such as death or marriage), to violence, etc. Collectors are also vulnerable to changes in their resource, waste. According to various surveys conducted in Dhaka, factors that can significantly affect collectors include the rainy season (which complicates work and reduces the value of collected items, particularly paper), the presence of religious or national holidays (which increase the amount of waste and likely income), and the closure or opening of businesses and industries that are both producers and potential buyers of materials for recycling.

Collectors are thus sensitive to economic changes, but also to changes in municipal waste management. When waste management becomes partly privately managed, such as a landfill site, waste pickers who used to work there have to turn to street collection or other activities, sometimes begging; the new landfill manager usually imposes conditions for access, which may reduce the work of children in the vicinity. Street collection has the advantage of providing better quality materials at source, so this change may be beneficial for some of the collectors.

=== Interventions of organisations ===
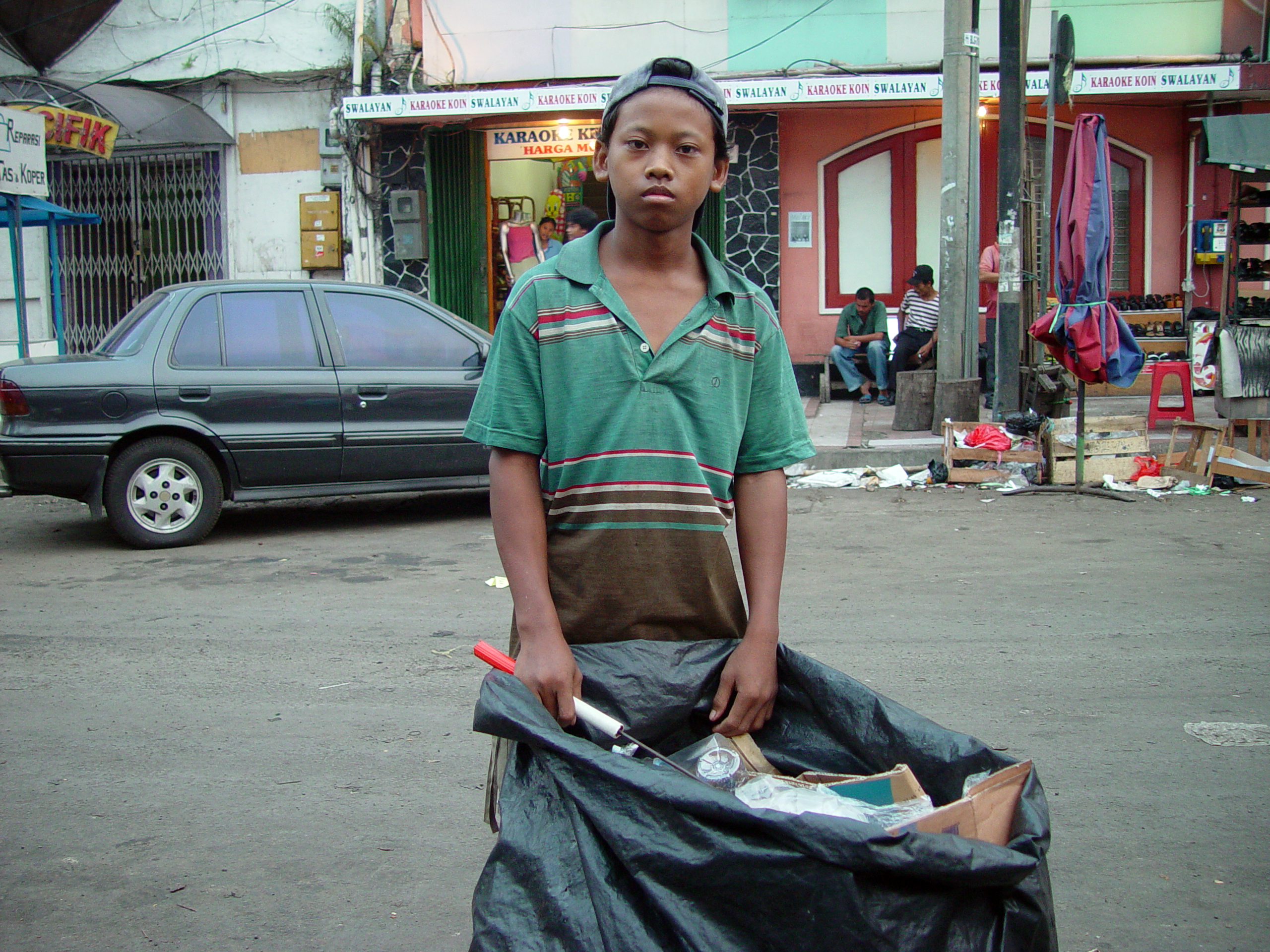
The reduction of child labour is often at the heart of projects targeting reclaimers, in part because of the emotion generated among donors.

Collectors are often the focus of both local and international NGO interventions, but even in the case of local organisations, funding is most often provided from abroad, through grants from international NGOs and development funds. The private sector is rarely involved and usually only subsidises projects where there is a direct interest: for example, to obtain recycled materials more easily, or to better control the recycling of certain products and avoid fraud. Few activities are self-financed, and in this case they are financed through income from recycling and composting; such projects have been set up in Egypt.

The ILO distinguishes four general objectives of such projects:

1. Improve the living conditions of waste pickers (housing, infrastructure, health, etc.);
2. Reduce the share of children working in recycling (creation of schools, hostels and alternatives);
3. Improve waste management in the city;
4. Provide alternatives: training, jobs...;

All but the second of these objectives are broader in scope, but include waste pickers in their target population.

Interventions already carried out in different parts of the world include:

- provision of food, tools and protective equipment, emergency care and vaccines, overnight shelter;
- formal and informal education: creation of childcare facilities, promotion and rehabilitation of schools, creation of scholarships, workshops and specific recycling training, organisation of leisure activities;
- income and employment generating activities: creation of microenterprises and cooperatives, development of microcredit possibilities, diversification of jobs (street sweeping, gardening...);
- Improving status: registration, creation of identity documents, public campaigns and lobbying on behalf of the collectors, education of the population on waste sorting;
- developing links with the public sector to integrate the collectors into waste management, and developing partnerships with the private sector to avoid intermediaries.

The concrete results of these interventions are mixed, their success depending on the correct integration of the different human, technical and economic elements. For example, projects that create dedicated sorting centres and allow collectors to work in an organised setting are often more successful than projects that provide protective equipment, which is rarely used as it is considered "impractical".

== Case of developed cities ==
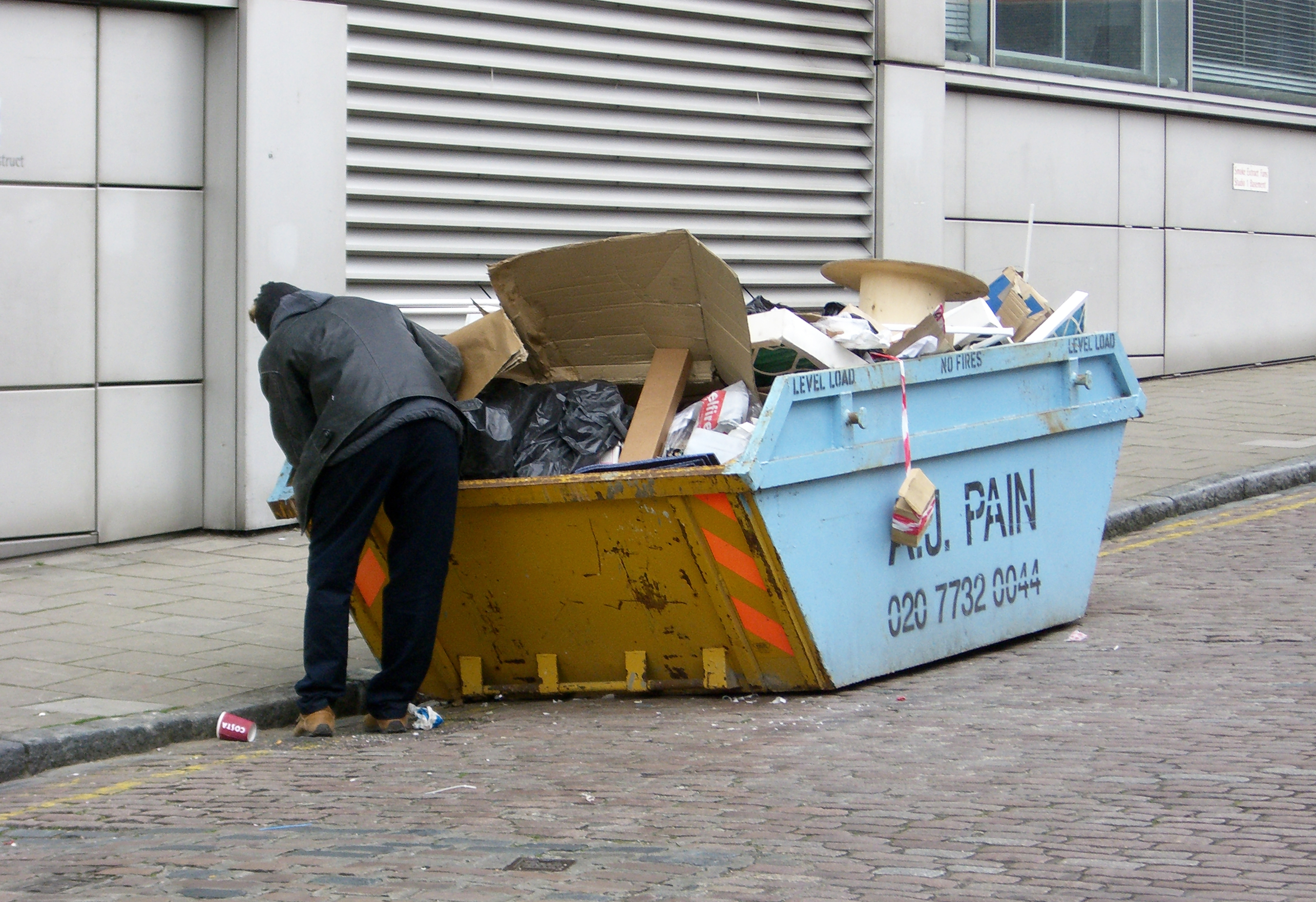
A man rummaging through rubbish in London.

In developed countries, there is generally no informal economy based on waste: public services have much tighter control over waste collection and treatment, access to landfill sites is restricted, streets are cleaned more often. Even when a private company takes care of part of the management system, the regulations in this area are too restrictive for an informal system to develop on a large scale. For these reasons, informal collection can only take place in the limited context of waste bins, especially dumpsters.

However, a distinction must be made between poor people and other uses.

=== Poor people ===
As in developing countries, poor people see rubbish bins as a means of subsistence; as waste is more widespread, even more directly reusable waste is found in rubbish bins. Food that is still edible is found around supermarkets and food shops; market areas are also rich in food, but it is more rarely packaged. The ban on selling food after its expiry date means that there is still packaged food in the bins, which limits the health risks.

The resale of waste, on the other hand, is very marginal; it applies mainly to returnable items such as bottles, and even to certain metals such as copper and lead, which have a high market value.

"Scavenging" is still very much frowned upon by the rest of the population, including poor people who have not reached this extreme. The act itself is not usually illegal, except when the bin is in a private place, but the stigma is significant and is associated with a loss of dignity, often linked to homelessness.

=== Other uses ===
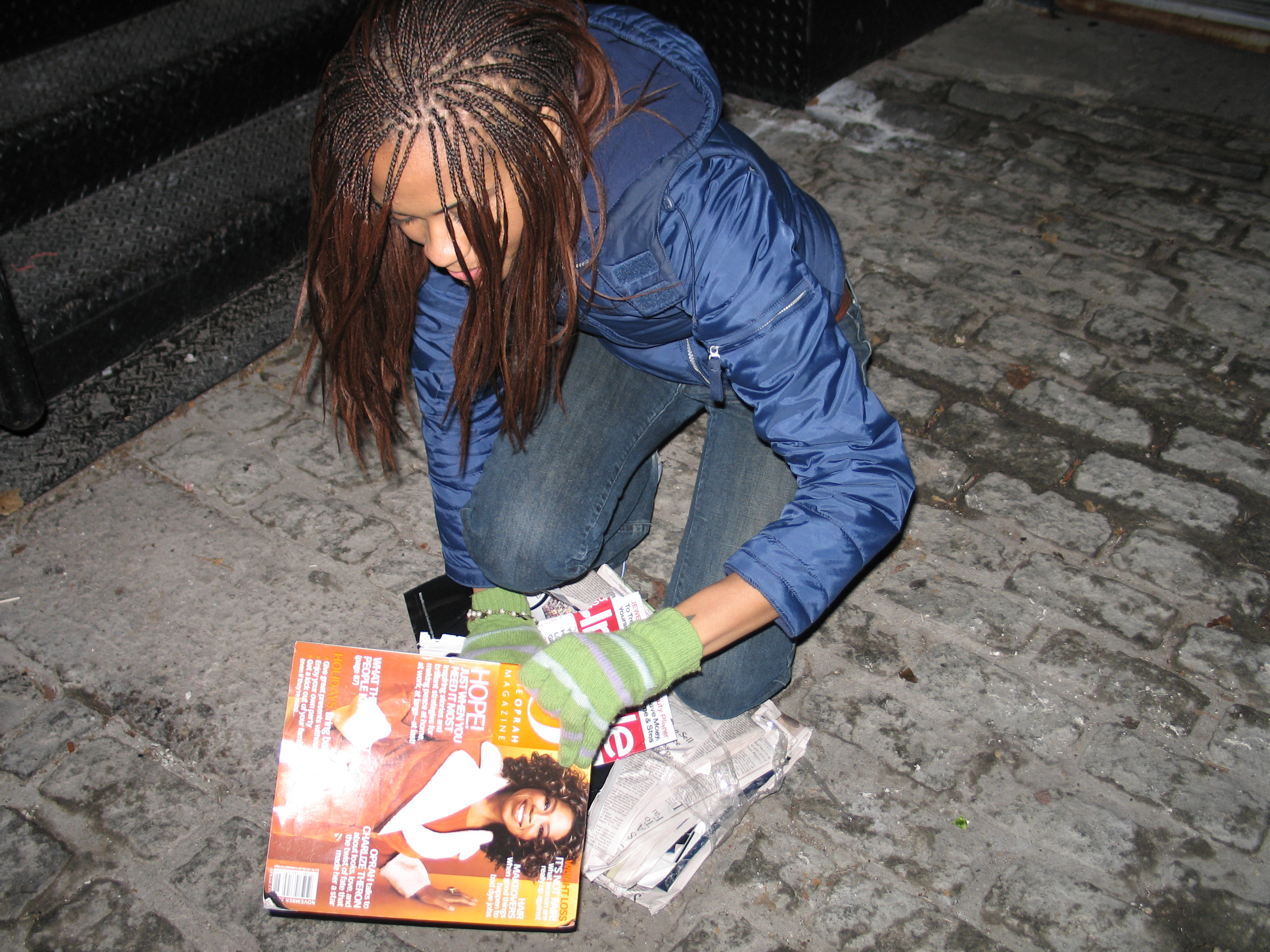
A person who has just gone through the rubbish to collect objects for artistic purposes.

Some people scavenge not out of economic necessity, but for the thrill of fishing or to stimulate and fulfil their creative fibre: repairing used objects, recovering raw materials for their art, etc. Garbage collection can become a conscious choice as part of an alternative lifestyle. (Note: Agnès Varda's documentary film Les Glaneurs et la Glaneuse (2000) is a testimony to this kind of life) For example, freeganism and deketarianism are practised by people who collect food from the bins of department stores and restaurants, primarily for the ethical purpose of combating waste. Others simply find it more convenient to collect an item from downstairs rather than going to the shop.

Garbage collection is also the preferred tool of waste sociologists, who study the sociology and waste of modern life. Finally, rubbish bins are a privileged place for collecting information, used, for example, for espionage purposes.

Even if they are not really waste, we should also mention the frequent case of recovery by the managers of sales depots and second-hand goods dealers, as well as the "Ressourceries-Recycleries" in France (as well as in Belgium and Canada under other names), which collect and recover waste in order to resell reused objects at a modest price and which raise awareness among their public of eco-citizen gestures to reduce waste (choice of consumption, maintenance of objects, second-life products, sorting, etc.), hence the 3Rs concept (Reduce, Reuse and Recycle waste).

== Appendices ==
=== Bibliography ===
There is not a great deal of background material on waste pickers, and there are currently no global statistics on the subject. The sources are mainly reports from international institutions such as the International Labour Organisation and the United Nations Children's Fund (UNICEF), although they have a greater interest in child labour in this context: for example, the ILO's 2004 thematic evaluation conducted jointly with the Dutch WASTE Institute is arguably the largest compilation of research to date. Other notable sources come from research institutes such as the UK's WEDC: Mansoor Ali's work is notable because it is long-term research conducted in waste picker communities, unlike most other research which is usually obtained through quick site visits.

Other sources are often NGO and World Bank reports, which focus more on concrete actions in each context.

Informal waste recovery in developing countries:

- various reports by the International Labour Organisation, in particular on child labour in this sector read online;
- Mike Davis, Planet of Slums, Verso, Londres - New York, 2006, 228 p. ISBN 1-84467-022-8.
- F. Flintoff, Management of Solid Wastes in Developing Countries, 2nd edition, 1994 : WHO Regional Publications. South-East Asia Series No.1 ISBN 92-9022-101-1.
- M. Ali, A. Cotton et K Westlake, Down to Earth: solid waste disposal for low-income countries, WEDC, Loughborough University, 1999 ISBN 0-906055-66-0.

Waste recovery as a "way of life" in developed countries:

- John Hoffman, Art and Science of Dumpster Diving ISBN 1-55950-088-3
- Ted Botha, Mongo: Adventures in Trash ISBN 1-58234-452-3

=== Related articles ===
- General articles: waste, recycling, sanitation
- In developed countries: freeganism, plogging
- Places: garbage, landfill
- Related topics: slum, poverty, child labour
- Waste pickers in Khon Kaen

=== External links ===
- Waste.nl page on waste pickers.
- Informal waste pickers in Argentina.
- freegan.fr : The French freegan website
- ENDA Maghreb Information leaflet on the informal sector of household waste recovery in the city of Rabat in Morocco.
