= Ali Smith (disambiguation) =

Ali Smith is a Scottish author and journalist.

Ali Smith may also refer to:

- Ali Smith (photographer)
- Ali Smith (athlete)
