= Dodger (novel) =

Novel by Terry Pratchett

- Cover
- Author: Terry Pratchett
- Cover artist: Paul Kidby
- Language: English
- Set in: London, VE
- Published: 13 September 2012 (UK), (Doubleday Children's)
- Media type: Print
- ISBN: 978-0385619271

Dodger is a novel written by Terry Pratchett, set in early Victorian London, and inspired by Charles Dickens's character the Artful Dodger. The book was released on 13 September 2012 in the UK.

== Plot ==
One night on the streets of London, a battered young woman leaps from a carriage, followed and assaulted by two men. The protagonist Dodger, a street urchin and tosher, emerging from a sewer drain, comes to her help and chases away the attackers. This is witnessed by two gentlemen, Charlie and Henry, who take the girl to the latter's nearby home, accompanied by Dodger. A doctor treats her injuries and discovers that she was pregnant and the child is lost.

Dodger's actions impress the gentlemen, as does the genuine affection they quickly see growing between him and the girl, who is tentatively called Simplicity. Charlie gives Dodger the task of finding information on the streets about her and the carriage from which she escaped. During the next days, Dodger thwarts a robbery attempt at the offices of the Morning Chronicle when meeting Charlie, and causes the arrest of a murderous barber named Sweeney Todd when he tries to improve his appearance before meeting Simplicity. These incidents turn Dodger into a celebrity, which helps him gather information, but also make it impossible for him to stay anonymous. This endangers Simplicity and prompts Charlie to have her moved to the house of his rich friend Angela Burdett-Coutts.

Through their activities (and from the recovered Simplicity herself), Charlie and Dodger learn that the girl had secretly married a prince of one of the German states and thereby become an obstacle to a planned political marriage. Her husband had then done nothing against his family's decision to destroy all evidence of the unsanctioned marriage, including Simplicity herself – the vicar and two witnesses to the wedding have already been killed.

This political dimension of the case (along with his celebrity status) soon have Dodger meet some of the Empire's top politicians, such as Benjamin Disraeli and Robert Peel. He learns that the family of Simplicity's husband is pressuring the British government to return her, and that the government cannot outright refuse this demand. Additionally, a mysterious assassin known only as the Outlander is rumoured to be looking for Dodger and Simplicity.

Dodger decides that the only solution is to fake Simplicity's death. Through subterfuge, he acquires the body of a girl looking similar to Simplicity who had died through suicide, and prepares it to be found after a faked attack (during which the real Simplicity would hide) witnessed by Charlie and Disraeli during a planned excursion into London's sewers. The plan is nearly foiled when the Outlander appears, turning out to be a woman. However, with the help of Simplicity, Dodger manages to defeat the assassin and go through with the plan after all. The two young lovers hide a while in Somerset and then return to London, where Dodger has an audience with Queen Victoria and is offered work as a spy for the government, which he accepts as it suits his talents.

== Characters ==
- Dodger, the main protagonist. He earns his livelihood as a tosher, looking for valuables in the sewers and early in the story he is given the title "king of the toshers". He considers himself a "geezer" and despite his young age he has earned respect amongst the poor in London.
- Simplicity is a mysterious girl that Dodger rescues from being beaten by two men at the beginning of the story. It is implied that she is of noble heritage and married to a prince from one of the German states. After a series of incidents of domestic violence, she fled to England, only to be pursued by her husband and his father, which prompts Dodger to try to defend her. She is given the name "Simplicity" by Henry Mayhew's wife and her real name is never revealed. After Dodger helped her fake her death, she calls herself "Serendipity".
- Solomon Cohen, an elderly craftsman who lives with Dodger in the Seven Dials rookery and acts as his mentor. He has a very smelly dog called "Onan" which Dodger likes to spend time with. Solomon's past is alluded several times in the novel, such as fleeing Russia from persecution and travelling the world afterwards. On his journeys he apparently had befriended a young man named Karl. He is Jewish but has a liberal view about many things and he is a member of the Freemasons.
- Charles Dickens, a journalist and writer who also appears to have a vast knowledge of the circumstances in which Dodger lives.
- Henry Mayhew, is a friend of Charlie who (together with his wife) first takes care of Simplicity while she recovers. He is also very interested in improving the conditions for London's poorest citizens. The novel is dedicated to the real Mayhew in honour of his work drawing attention to the plight of London's poorest through his book London Labour and the London Poor.
- Angela Burdett-Coutts, an independent woman who inherited a large sum of money and who uses her wealth and connections to help those who need it. She takes in Simplicity after it became clear that she was not safe at Mayhew's house and uses her resources to protect her.
- Benjamin Disraeli, an up-and-coming young politician and friend of Charlie. He is introduced as a member of parliament and plays a supporting role in Dodger's scheme to fake Simplicity's death.
- Sir Robert Peel, the head of police in London. The police officers in the novel are called "peelers" because of him. Despite his official statements, he is supportive of Simplicity's wish not to be returned to her husband and is willing to overlook a number of Dodger's activities in order to accomplish this.
- The Outlander, a wanted assassin who is called to kill Simplicity and Dodger. The authorities have been finding it hard to catch a man who seems to look different every time he commits a crime, failing to notice that there is always the same woman at his side.
- Mr. Tenniel, an illustrator for Punch who completes an illustration of Dodger.
- Sweeney Todd, a barber traumatised by his experiences in the Napoleonic Wars. Suffering from PTSD, he believes that his customers are soldiers he could not save in the war coming back to life which leads him to kill them. Dodger becomes a hero by disarming him but he assesses the situation correctly (that Todd is not to blame for his actions) and uses some of the money he comes into to improve Todd's life in Bedlam.
- Joseph Bazalgette, a civil engineer, interested in the sewers.
- Charles Babbage, made a mechanical computer, called his Analytical Engine.
- Ada Lovelace, the first programmer and, "A credit to her father" — being a reference to Lord Byron.
- Dick Turpin, highwayman.

== Setting ==
According to the author's afterword, the story is set "broadly in the first quarter of Queen Victoria's reign", which would be between 1837 and 1853. However, Pratchett had to "tweak" history a little to get the combination of persons he wanted in place: specifically, Sir Robert Peel is shown as Home Secretary, which he was under Victoria's predecessor William IV.

== Sequel ==
In November 2013, Pratchett released Dodger's Guide to London.
