= Tosher =

Someone who scavenges in the sewers

A tosher is someone who scavenges in the sewers, a sewer-hunter, especially in London during the Victorian era. The word tosher was also used to describe the thieves who stripped valuable copper from the hulls of ships moored along the Thames. The related slang term "tosh" referred to valuables thus collected. Both "tosher" and "tosh" are of unknown origin.

== In fiction ==
In the 1960 film The Day They Robbed the Bank of England, which is set in 1901, a tosher becomes involved to help break into the bank through the old sewer system.

A tosher in Victorian London is the profession of the title character in Dodger, a 2012 novel by Terry Pratchett.

The protagonist of Nick Harkaway's 2012 novel Angelmaker describes the London sewers and backstreets as "Tosher's Beat".

The character Murky John is a Tosher in Year of the Rabbit Series 1 Episode 2.

In Elif Shafak's novel, There are Rivers in the Sky (2024), a tosher goes into labor while scavenging in the banks of the Thames River.

== See also ==
- Junk man – Scavenging solid waste for personal use
- Mudlark – Someone who scavenges for items of value on the shores of rivers, someone who scavenges in river mud.
- Waste picker – Scavenging solid waste for personal use
- List of obsolete occupations
