= Ali Smith (photographer) =

American photographer

Ali Smith is an American photographer, musician, and author who in the 1990s was a bass player for the band Speedball Baby. Her memoir The Ballad of Speedball Baby, was published by Blackstone Publishing in 2024.

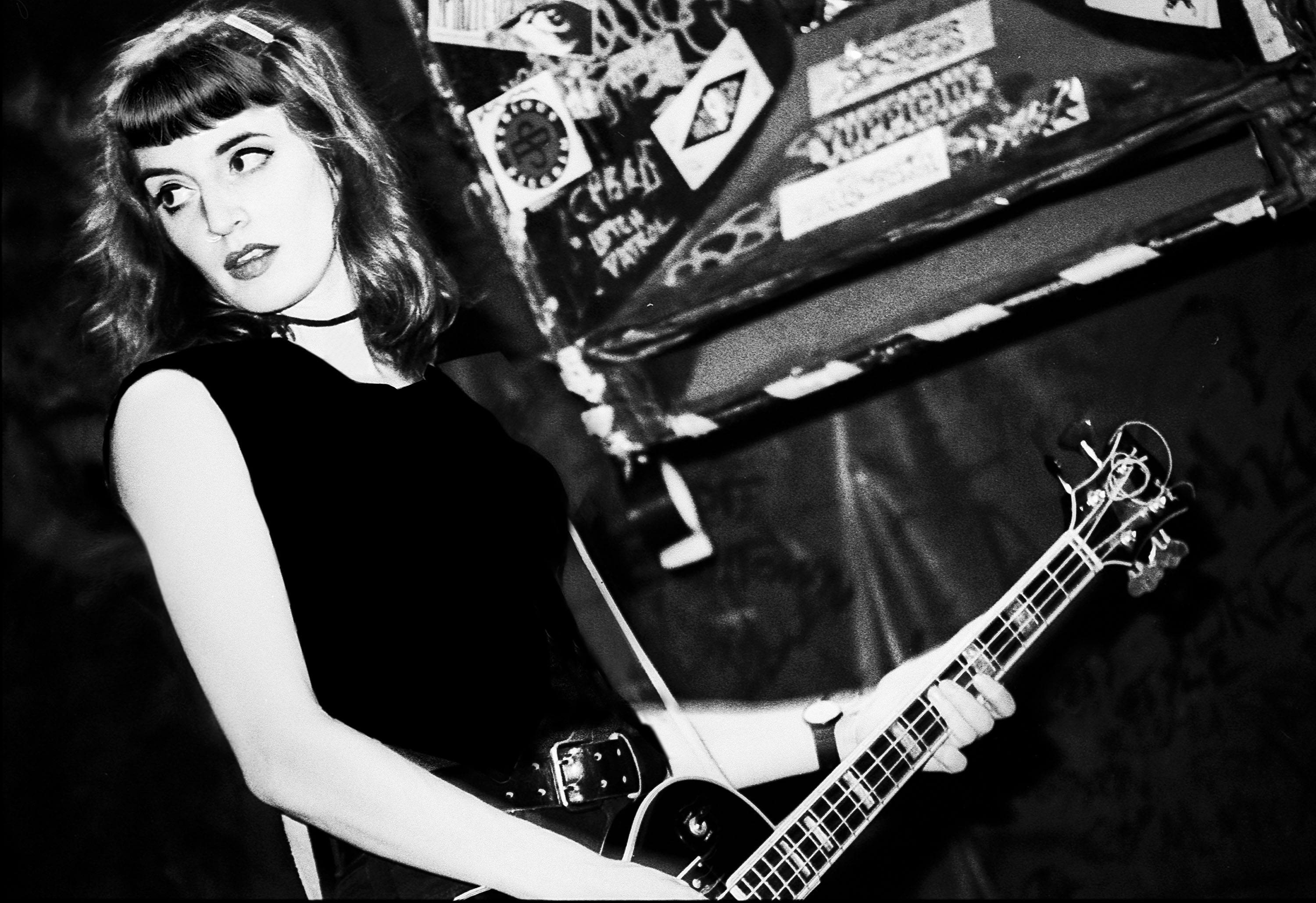
Smith in the 90s

Ali Smith has published two books of photography. She is a contributor to publications including The Guardian, The Observer, The New York Times, People Magazine, and The Village Voice.

== Photography ==
In 2002, Smith published her first book, Laws of the Bandit Queens. It contains portraits of women who influenced Smith in her career goals by succeeding while living unconventional lives. Some of the 35 women included are Alice Walker, Sandra Bernhard, Lydia Lunch, and Ann Magnuson.

Smith's second book of photography — Momma Love: How the Mother Half Lives — is an exploration of modern motherhood through a feminist perspective via portraiture and deeply personal interviews. It was a New York Times "pick", activist Gloria Steinem wrote the back cover copy, calling it "a gift to moms," and photographer Amy Arbus deemed it "essential".

In her personal work, Smith continued pursuing inspirational stories about issues she cared about most, writing and photographing essays about gun violence in America, medical marijuana, the environmental work of waste-pickers.

Smith's photo assignments cover subjects as varied as gun violence, to celebrity portraits of Isabella Rossellini and Paulina Porizkova, among other clients. She also did work for Rolling Stone magazine, including, in 2023, photographing Billy Corgan of Smashing Pumpkins.

== Writing ==
Smith has published three books:

- Laws of the Bandit Queens: Words to Live by from 35 of Today's Most Revolutionary Women (2002) Pub. Three Rivers Press
- Momma Love: How the Mother Half Lives (2013) Pub. Thunder Baby Press
- The Ballad of Speedball Baby: A Memoir (2024) Pub. Blackstone Publishing Inc

Smith's writing has accompanied the photography in her books and publications. A few examples: Parenting during the pandemic for the New York Times; The environmental importance of work by waste-pickers and “canners” for the Village Voice; The effect of Donald Trump’s election on children aging out of the foster care system; How to be environmentally responsible at Thanksgiving for the Village Voice; A poem for the pandemic.

== Music ==
From 1995 and through the early 2000s, Smith was bassist for the New York City-based, avant garde, blues-influenced punk band Speedball Baby.
