= Waste pickers in Khon Kaen =

Waste pickers in Khon Kaen, Thailand are unregistered workers who search through trash for recyclable goods that can be sold to distributors for a price. These workers live in all parts of the city, ranging from slums adjacent to railroad tracks to houses built on the landfill. Most scavengers have moved from surrounding provinces in search of a more reliable wage that can support their families. Others, however, were bankrupted after the Crash in 1997 and became scavengers. The two main communities of scavengers are slum communities and those who live by the landfill.

== Slum communities ==
These communities have two methods of scavenging. The first is with a push cart, where the scavenger walks to local trash cans in search of recyclables. This method usually grosses 170 baht per day, or $5.50 a day. The other method uses a motorcycle with a cart tied to the back. This method grosses about 250 baht per day, or $7.30 a day. Slum communities scavengers search for goods between the hours of 3:00 am till 10 am. Once they have the goods, they separate them out based on a predetermined classification; for example, bottles are separated from cans and plastic from glass. There are currently efforts being made to create a collective bargaining agreement, which would allow the new organization to negotiate higher rates for their recyclables.

== Landfill community ==
This community grew out of the creation of a massive landfill on the edge of Khon Kaen. The landfill is 0.5 km^{2} in size and adjacent to farmland. People began to move here shortly after the construction was complete because it is the largest and most accessible area to search for recyclables. The people of this community had a daily average income of 800 baht, which is $26.00. However, with the increase in city scavengers and governmental recycling methods, this community has seen massive cut in income. The current average is around 100 baht per day, which is $3.00. The work day for this community begins at 3:00 am because that is when the new trash is dropped of by the landfill dump trucks.

== Recycling prices ==
All per kilogram.

- Broken bottles: 1 baht
- Color paper: 2 baht
- Sheet metal: 3 baht
- Cardboard box: 4 baht
- White paper: 5 baht
- Colored plastic: 7 baht
- Iron: 9 baht
- Clear plastic bottle: 14 baht
- Opaque bottle: 20 baht
- Aluminum: 40 baht
- Cans: 50 baht
- Brass: 80 baht
- Copper: 200 baht

== Problems ==
Scavengers face two major problems. They are in economic despair and their health is deteriorating. Most people do not earn enough to get out of debt and are forced to borrow from loan sharks, who charge exorbitant interest rates. The health risks are most visible at the landfill community. Every day, this community must look through trash that includes hospital waste; for example bloody bags and needles. Another health risk is the incinerator that burns across the landfill. The smoke from the burned trash has so negatively affected the environment that it is now unsafe to drink the rainwater. Some work has been done to highlight the problems this community face. Alicia Rice, a documentarian, crowdsourced a project to examine these issues.
