= Waste picker =

Scavenging solid waste for personal use

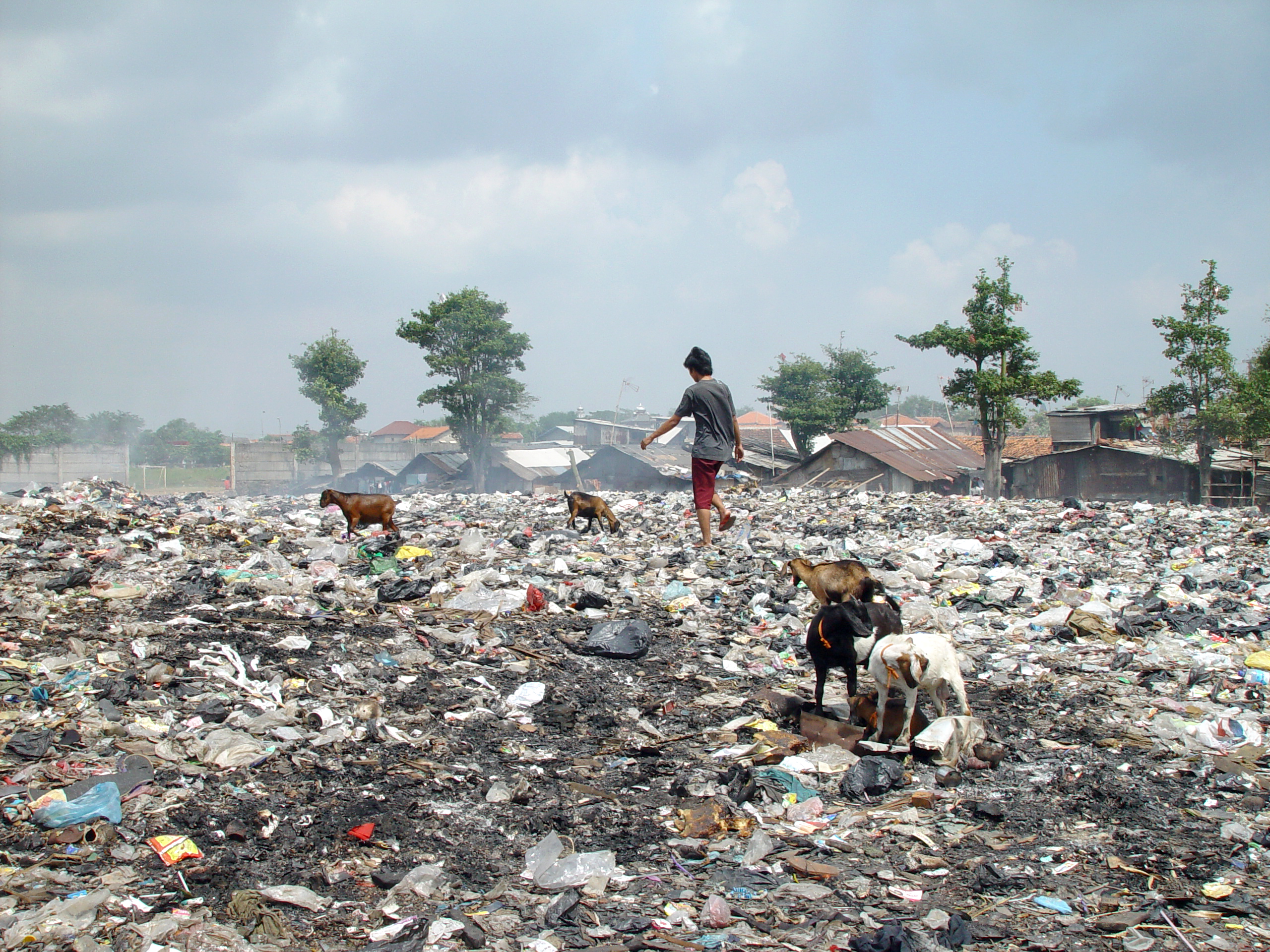
Scavenging in Jakarta, Indonesia

A waste picker also known as waste collector or garbage collector is a person who salvages reusable or recyclable materials thrown away by others to sell or for personal consumption. There are millions of waste pickers worldwide, predominantly in developing countries, but increasingly in post-industrial countries as well.

Various forms of waste picking have been practiced since antiquity, but modern traditions of waste picking took root during industrialization in the nineteenth century. Since the late 20th century, waste picking has expanded vastly in the developing world due to urbanization, toxic colonialism and the global waste trade. Many cities only provide solid waste collection.

== Terminology ==
Many terms are used to refer to people who salvage recyclables from the waste stream for sale or personal consumption. In English, these terms include rag picker, reclaimer, informal resource recoverer, litter picker, recycler, poacher, salvager, scavenger, and waste picker; in Spanish cartonero, chatarrero, pepenador, clasificador, minador and reciclador; and in Portuguese catador de materiais recicláveis. A more contemporary term, focusing on the outcome of the professional activity, is "informal sector recycling". However, the word "informal" can be partly misleading, because in practice a continuum between total informality and proper organization in taxed registered formal activities may be encountered.

In 2008, participants of the First World Conference of Waste Pickers chose the term "waste picker" for English usage to facilitate global communication. The term "scavenger" is also commonly used, but many waste pickers find it demeaning due to the implied comparison with animals.

A waste picker is different from a waste collector because the waste collected by the latter may be destined for a landfill or incinerator, not necessarily for a recycling facility.

"Dumpster diving" generally refers to the practice of anti-consumer and freegan activists who reclaim items such as food and clothes from the waste stream as a form of protest against consumer culture. "Waste picking" generally refers to activity motivated purely by economic need.

== Prevalence and demographics ==
There is little reliable data about the number and demographics of waste pickers worldwide. Most academic research on waste pickers is qualitative rather than quantitative. Systematic large-scale data collection is difficult due to the profession's informal nature, porous borders, seasonally fluctuating workforce, and widely dispersed and mobile worksites. Also, many researchers are reluctant to produce quantitative data out of fear that it might be used to justify crackdowns on waste picking by authorities. Thus, the large-scale estimates that do exist are mainly extrapolations based on very small original research samples. In his book, "The World's Scavengers" (2007), Martin Medina provides a methodological guide to researching waste picking.

In 1988, the World Bank estimated that 1–2% of the global population subsists by waste picking. A 2010 study estimates that there are 1.5 million waste pickers in India alone. Brazil, the country that collects the most robust official statistics on waste pickers, estimates that nearly a quarter million of its citizens engage in waste picking.

Waste picker incomes vary vastly by location, form of work, and gender. Some waste pickers live in extreme poverty, but many others earn multiple times their country's minimum wage. Recent studies indicate that waste pickers in Belgrade, Serbia, earn approximately US$3 per day, while waste pickers in Cambodia typically earn $1 per day. Official statistics in Brazil indicate that men earn more than women, regardless of age. Approximately two-thirds of Brazil's waste pickers are men overall, but this proportion jumps to 98% in high income waste picker groups (those earning between 3–4 times the minimum wage). No women were found in the highest income groups (those earning over 10 times the minimum wage).

== Causes ==
=== In developing countries ===
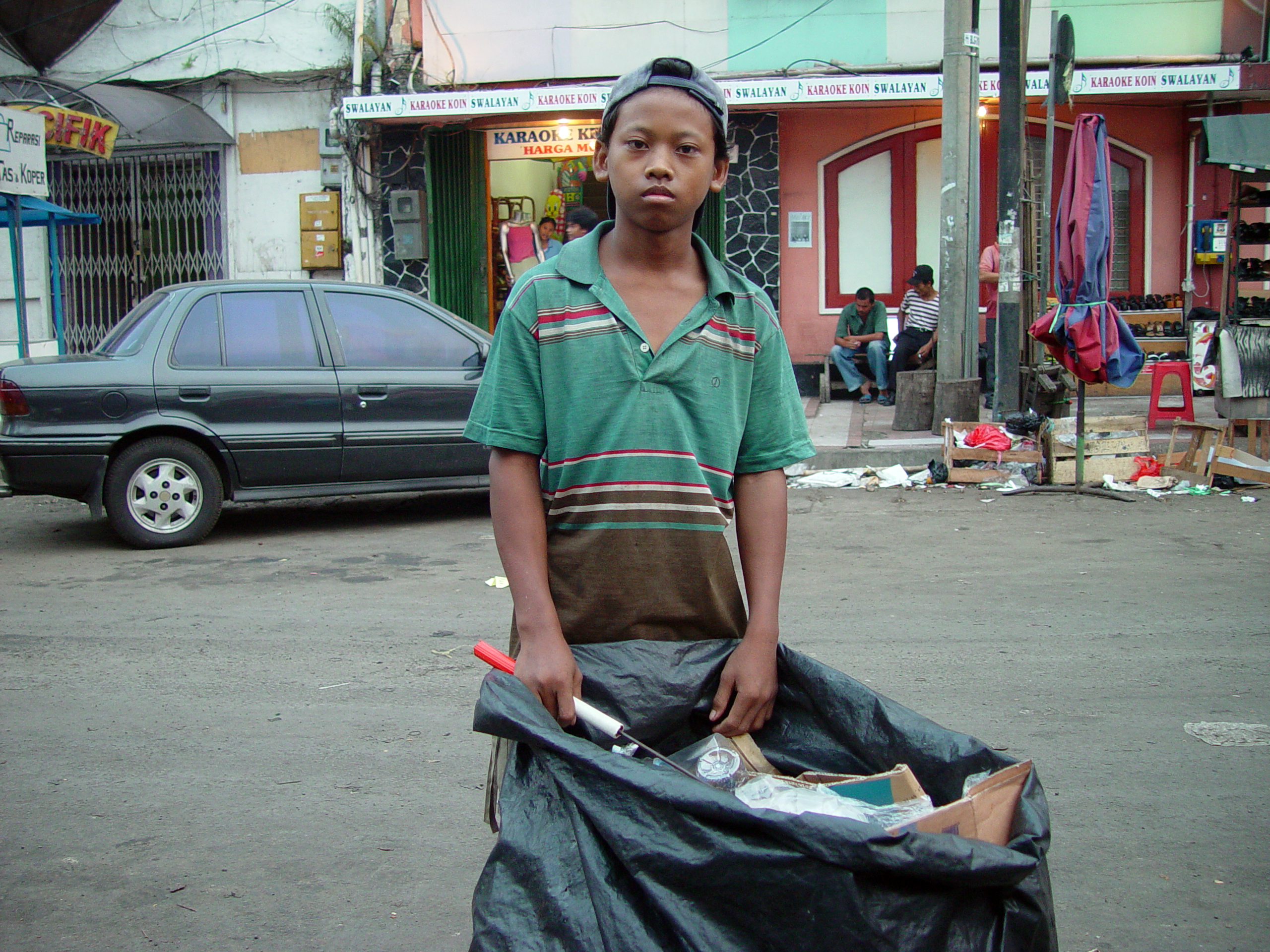
Waste picker in Indonesia

Over the past half century, in-country migration and increased fertility rates have caused the population of cities in the developing world to mushroom. The global population of urban dwellers is expected to double between 1987 and 2015, with 90% of this growth occurring in developing countries. Much of the new population has settled in urban slums and squatter settlements, which have expanded rapidly with no central planning. The United Nations Habitat Report found that nearly one billion people worldwide live in slums, about a third of the world's urban dwellers.

The rapid urbanization greatly increased the demand for informal waste collecting services, as cities lacked the infrastructure and resources to collect the totality of wastes generated by their inhabitants. Despite spending 30–50% of operation budgets on waste management, developing world cities today collect only 50–80% of refuse generated by inhabitants. Residents and businesses often resort to burning garbage or disposing of it in streets, rivers, vacant lots, and open dumps. This is a source of air, land, and water pollution that threatens human health and the environment. Informal waste collectors help mitigate this harm by collecting recyclable materials by foot or in pushcarts, tricycles, donkey carts, horse carts, and pickup trucks.

On the supply side, urbanization has facilitated the expansion of waste picking by creating a large pool of unemployed and underemployed residents with few alternative means of earning a livelihood. Known as "the one industry that is always hiring", waste picking provides a cushion for many who lose their jobs during times of war, crisis, and economic downturn in countries that do not have welfare systems. It is also one of the few work opportunities available to people who lack formal education or job experience.

=== In post-industrial countries ===
Though documentation exists of rag pickers and scrap metal collectors supplying goods to paper mills and foundries as early as the 17th century, modern waste picking did not flourish in the US and Europe until the 19th century. Just as in the developing world, the combination of industrialization and urbanization led to three trends which favored the blossoming of the informal waste collecting industry: increased generation of urban waste, increased demand for raw materials from industry, and increased numbers of urban dwellers in need of livelihoods. In that era, waste pickers were known as wharf rats, tinkers, rag and bone men, mudlarks, and ragpickers. By the mid-20th century waste picking decreased, as waste management industries were formalized, and welfare states decreased the poor's reliance on informal recycling.

Beginning in the mid-1990s, however, informal recycling in parts of the United States and Western Europe once again began to mushroom. Two factors fueled the boom: First, the demand for recycling surged due to the increased waste stream, declining room in landfills, new recycling technologies, and the efforts of environmentalists. In 1985 only one roadside recycling program existed in the United States. By 1998, there were 9,000 such programs and 12,000 recyclable drop-off centers. Laws were passed in some states making it illegal not to recycle. Second, changes in the political economy including the loss of manufacturing jobs, cutbacks to government employment, and the roll back of the welfare state increased the ranks of the poor, working poor, and homeless—thus there were more people disposed to wastepick as a full-time profession or supplemental job.

American waste pickers predominantly collect cans, bottles, and cardboard. Many immigrants work as waste pickers because language and documentation barriers limit their opportunities to work elsewhere. Many homeless people also work as waste pickers—some describe it as their only alternative to panhandling. Some recyclers use vans to increase their yield while others work on foot with carts. Anecdotal evidence suggests that most American waste pickers are male, as waste picking is widely considered too dirty and strenuous a job for women. During an ethnography of homeless recyclers in San Francisco, sociologist Teresa Gowan claims to have met hundreds of male waste pickers, but only four female waste pickers.

== Costs and benefits ==
=== Social and ecological benefits ===
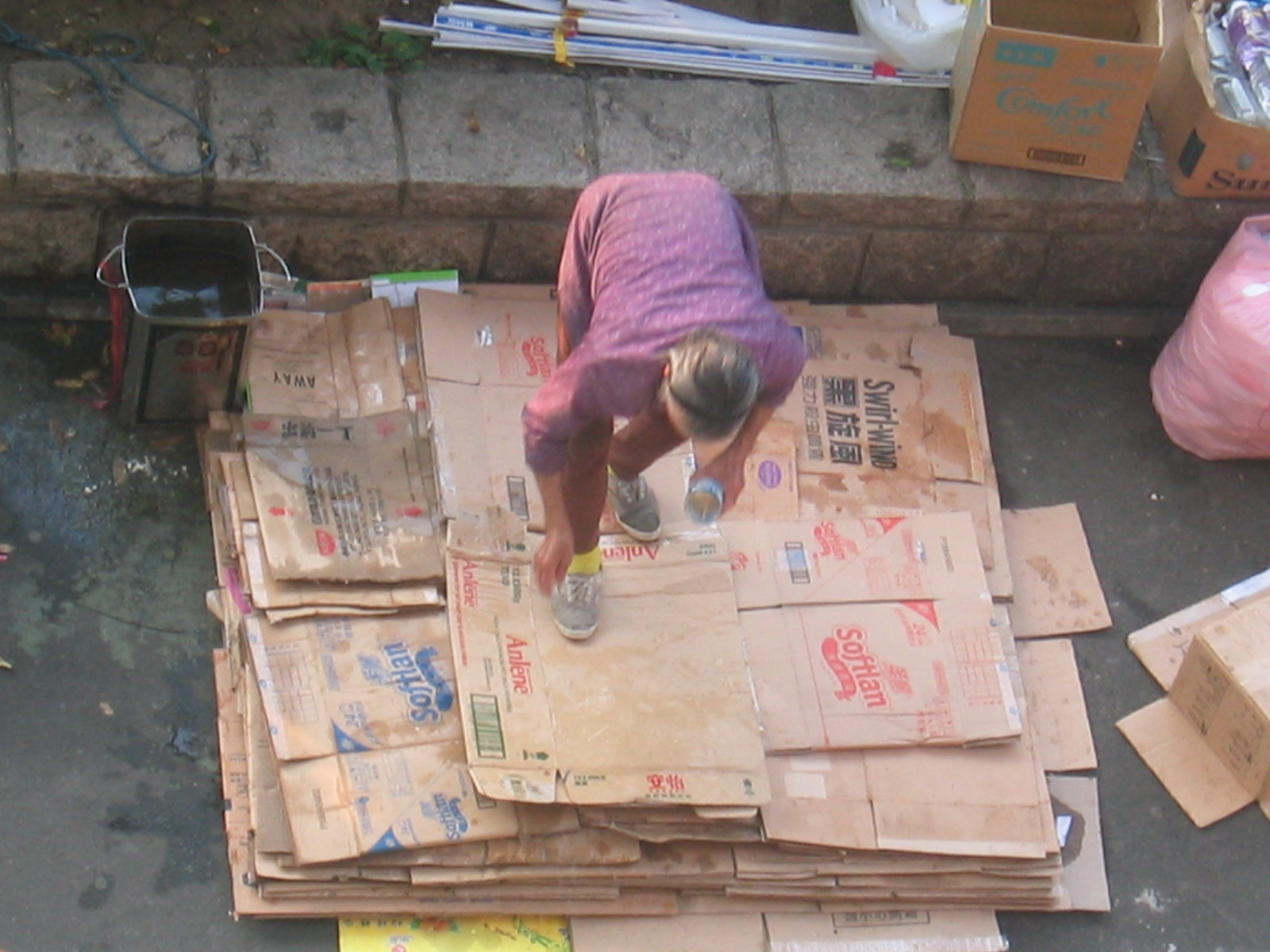
A scavenger in Hong Kong pours water onto the paper she has collected in order to increase her profit by adding to its weight.

Waste picking offers significant ecological, economic, and social benefits:

- Job creation: Waste picking provides a source of livelihood to extremely poor people with few other employment opportunities. Though many waste pickers practice their trade as a full-time profession, its flexible hours make it accessible to women with other care responsibilities and to people looking to supplement income from other jobs. During times of need, waste picking serves as a safety net to street children, orphans, the elderly, widows, migrants, the disabled, the unemployed, and victims of armed conflicts. Waste picking also benefits the broader economy by supplying raw materials to industry and creating many associated jobs for middlemen who purchase, sort, process, and resell materials collected by waste pickers. Waste picking can also benefit individuals who are waste pickers for the fun of the activity or additionally, individuals who participate during certain times of the year for better pickings but still have a more reliable main source of income.
- Public health and sanitation: Waste pickers collect garbage from neighborhoods that lack public services. Without waste pickers, residents would be forced to burn trash, or dispose of it in rivers, streets and empty lots. Waste pickers provide the only solid waste removal service in many cities.
- Municipal savings: Waste pickers provide between 50 and 100% of waste collecting services in most cities of the developing world, according to a 2010 UN Habitat report. This effectively serves as a mass subsidy for city governments, who do not pay for the labor. Moreover, recycling expands the lifespan of city dumps and landfills.
- Reducing pollution and mitigating climate change: By cutting the quantity of virgin materials needed for production, waste pickers save room in landfills, lessen water and energy consumption, reduce air and water pollution, and abate climate change. Since 2009, international delegations of waste pickers have attended at least five global climate change conferences to demand that climate funds invest in resource recovery programs that will help ensure waste pickers' livelihoods, rather than waste disposal technologies like incinerators.

=== Social costs ===
Waste pickers not only generate social benefits, but also potential costs as well. These include:

- Occupational hazards: See discussion below.
- Child labor: Children commonly work as waste pickers. This may interfere with their education, or harm their physical, emotional, and social well-being.
- Litter: Waste pickers working on streets sometimes spread waste from trash bags, sullying the sidewalk and creating more work for city street sweepers.
- Public nuisance: Many people view waste pickers as a nuisance or source of shame for their communities. Waste pickers' perceived poverty and lack of sanitation makes some people uncomfortable or fearful. In developing countries especially, many argue that modern services should replace waste pickers.
- Pilfering of public property: In some cities, waste pickers have been known to steal, melt down, and resell public property such as telephone and electrical copper wire, steel fencing, or manhole covers.

=== Occupational hazards ===
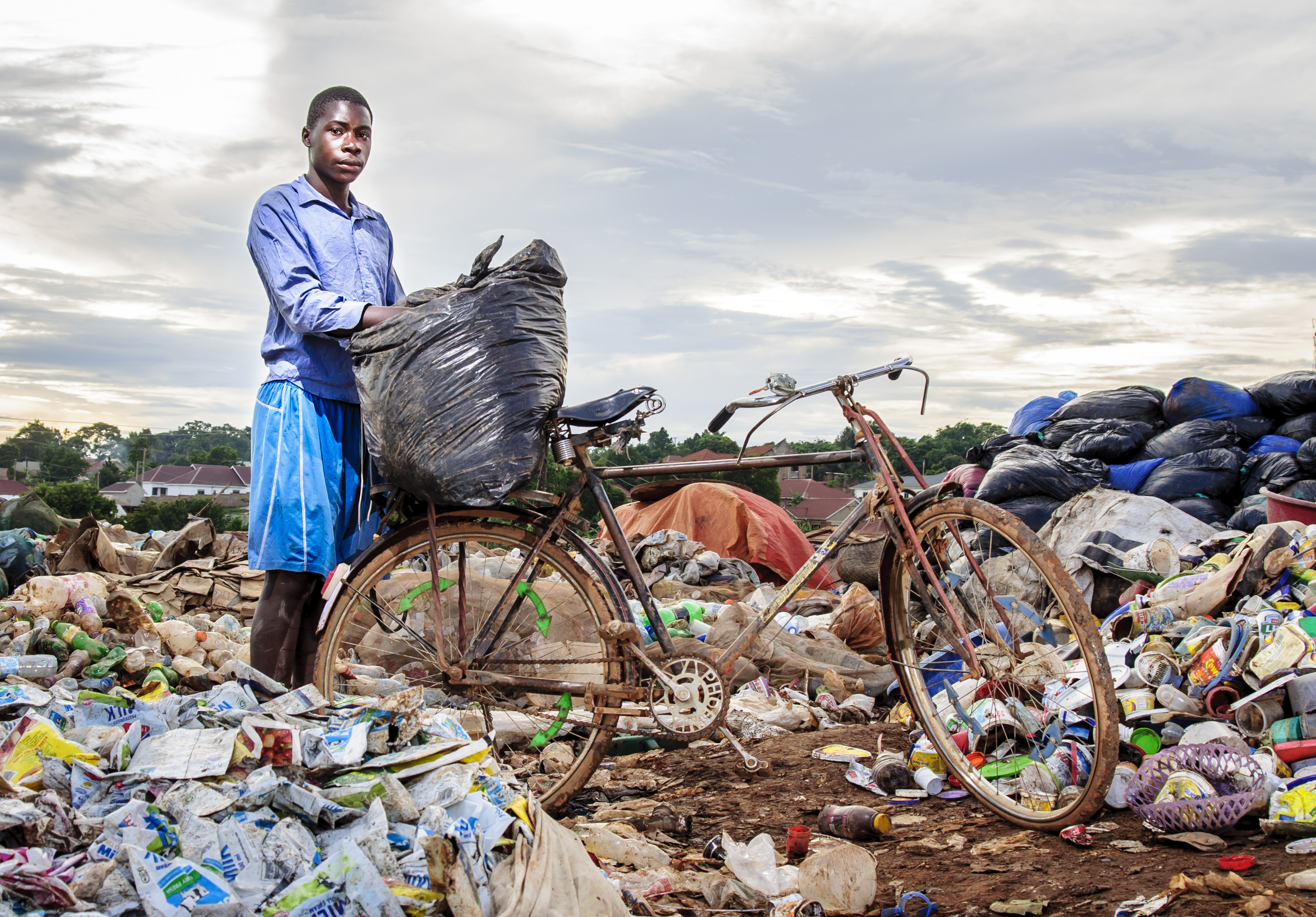
A young man in Uganda who is working in a waste dump. Because of work locations and conditions, there is a high chance of catching disease or injury while working as a waste picker in certain environments.

==== Health risks ====
There is a high prevalence of disease among waste pickers due to their exposure to hazardous materials such as fecal matter, paper saturated by toxic materials, bottles and containers with chemical residues, contaminated needles, and heavy metals from batteries. A study in Mexico City found the average lifespan of a dumpsite waste collector to be 39 years, compared to the national average of 69 years, though a later World Bank study estimated life span to be 53 years. In Port Said, Egypt, a 1981 study showed an infant mortality rate of 1/3 among waste pickers (one out of three babies dies before reaching age one).

==== Risks of injury ====
Among the most common types of job-related injuries for waste pickers are back and hand injuries caused by lifting heavy objects with little equipment. In a study of 48 waste pickers in Santo André, Brazil, almost all workers reported pain in the back, legs, shoulder, arms, and hands. Waste pickers who work in open dumps are exposed to large amounts of toxic fumes, and face other severe threats including being run over by trucks and caught in surface subsidence, trash slides, and fires. On 10 July 2000, several hundred waste pickers were killed by a trash slide from a huge garbage mountain after monsoon rains at an open dump in Payatas, Philippines.

==== Stigma, harassment, and violence ====
Most waste picking activity is illegal or unpermitted, so waste pickers commonly face harassment by police and authorities. Also, there is widespread public scorn against waste pickers due to their poverty and perceived lack of hygiene. Women are subject to greater harassment, particularly sexual harassment due to their low social status and lack of social support.

One of the most extreme manifestations of such stigma occurs in Colombia, where, since the 1980s, "social cleansing" vigilante groups, sometimes working with police complicity, have killed at least two thousand waste collectors, beggars, and prostitutes—whom they refer to as "disposables" (desechables). In 1992, around the peak of this activity, eleven corpses of murdered waste collectors were discovered at a university in Barranquilla. Their organs had been sold for transplants and bodies sold to the medical school for dissection (Medina 2009, 155).

== Waste picker organizing ==
Traditionally, scholars assumed that informal workers such as waste pickers could not collectively organize due to structural barriers such as lack of legal protection, widely dispersed worksites, porous borders to their profession, a culture of independence and individualism, lack of institutional experience, and lack of money and time to build organizations. Nonetheless, in recent decades waste pickers across Latin America, Asia, and Africa have begun collectively organizing to win a place within formal recycling systems.

Waste pickers use many organizational formats including cooperatives, associations, companies, unions, and micro-enterprises. Despite the differences in format, most of these organizations share three primary purposes. First, by pooling capital, establishing microenterprises, and forming partnerships with business and government, waste collectors increase their selling power. Second, by securing uniforms, safety equipment, and work permits, cooperatives increase workplace dignity and safety. And third, by demanding recognition and compensation from the state for their environmental and economic contributions, cooperatives increase members' political might. These three functions—political influence, workplace dignity and safety, and increased earnings—are mutually reinforcing, like legs on a stool.

Some waste pickers have created "women's only" organizations, which seek to combat gender-based discrimination at worksites and in communities. A study in Brazil indicates that women are heavily overrepresented even in coed organizations, making up 56% of the membership despite the fact that they represent only a third of the total waste picking population.

Beginning in the 1990s, waste picker organizations in many parts of the world began uniting into regional, national, and transnational coalitions to increase their political voice and economic leverage. In March 2008, delegates from 30 countries gathered in Bogotá, Colombia, for the first World Conference (and Third Latin American Conference) of Waste Pickers (WIEGO 2008). One of the key issues discussed was the global trend of privatization and concentration of waste management systems. Normally, privatization is thought of as the handover of government functions to the private sector, but in this case, privatization often means the transference of services formerly provided by informal waste collectors to private firms. As waste streams have expanded due to increased consumption, the waste management industry is becoming increasingly lucrative. Governments around the world are granting private companies monopolies on waste management systems, meaning that the cooperatives' survival hinges on building political and economic alliances needed to win contracts—often an uphill battle given authorities' distrust of waste collectors and the cooperatives' lack of capital for modern machinery.

=== Organizing in Latin America ===
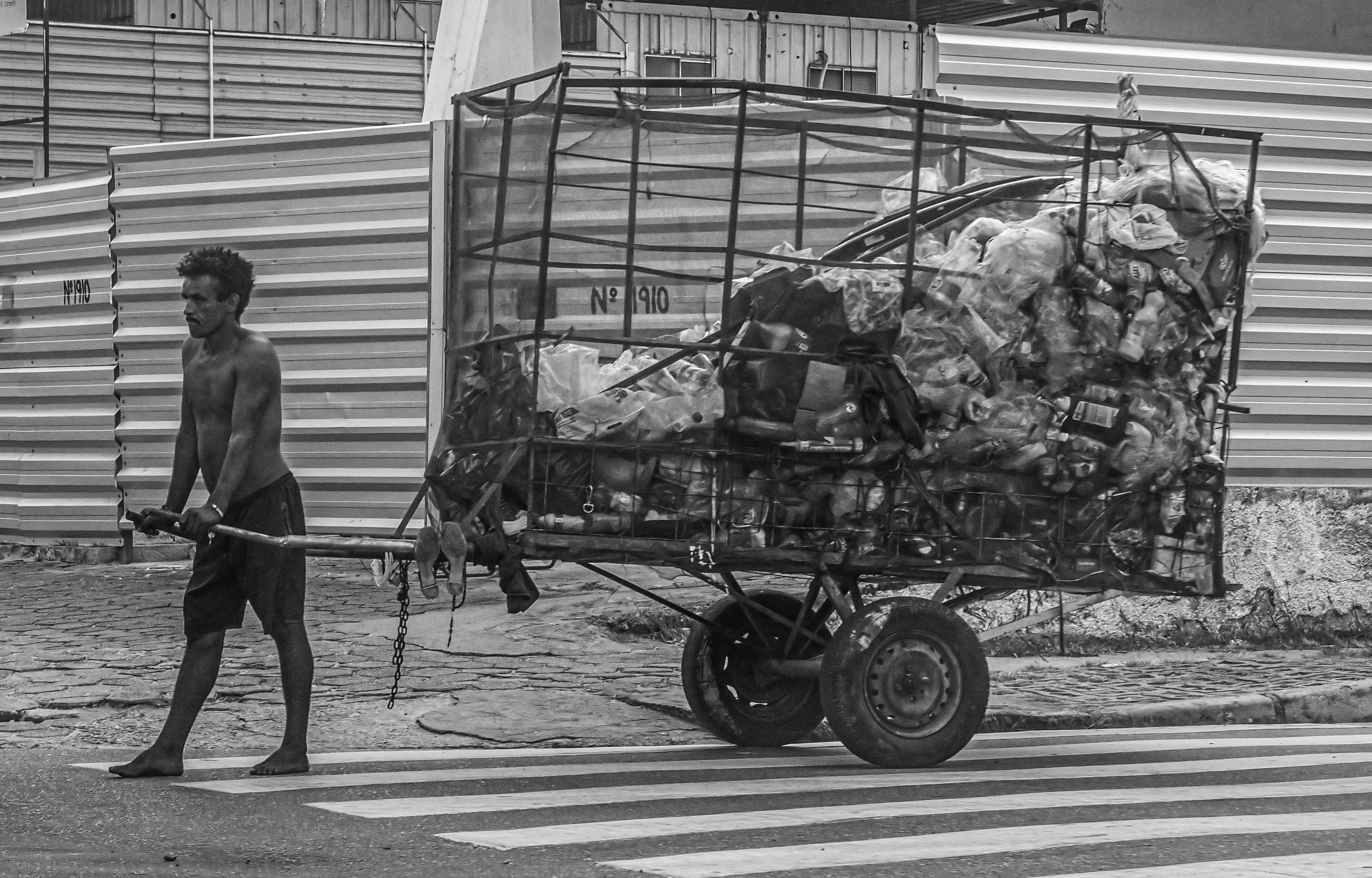
A picker in Brazil who has collected cans and bottles

In 1962, the first known Latin American waste picker's organization, Cooperativa Antioqueña de Recolectores de Subproductos, was created in Medellín, Colombia. The Colombian waste pickers movement did not emerge as a veritable political force until 1990, however, when four cooperatives who had been fighting the closure of a landfill united as the Waste Collector's Association of Bogotá (Asociación de Recicladores de Bogotá, ARB). Today the ARB is one of the world's most active and established waste picker organizations. In 2013, the Goldman Environmental Prize was awarded to Nohra Padilla (representing the ARB) for her contribution to waste management and recycling in Colombia. Throughout the 1990s, powerful waste collectors associations began to form in other Latin American countries as well—most notably in Brazil, Argentina, Chile, and Uruguay.

In 2005, Brazil hosted the first meeting of the Latin American Waste Picker Network (LAWPN)—an organization that now represents waste pickers movements from 16 countries. LAWPN has four key functions. First, it facilitates exchanges of knowledge, technology, and strategies between member organizations through regional conventions, country-to-country delegations, telecommunications, and strategic reports. Second, it organizes transnational solidarity to aid in local battles. For example, when waste pickers in Montevideo, Uruguay, needed support in a local campaign, member organizations across Latin America issued solidarity statements and pressured their national ambassadors in Uruguay to do the same. Third, LAWPN sends leaders from countries with strong waste picker movements to countries with weak movements in order to promote the development of new leadership and organizations. Fourth, LAWPN organizes global waste picker committees to make appeals for support to transnational governance organizations such as the Inter-American Development Bank, the UN Convention on Climate Change, and the International Labour Organization.

In Argentina, The Movement of Excluded Workers (excluded in the sense that their work is not recognized by the government and they are excluded from receiving rights) is the largest waste pickers organization. It is a social organization, independent from political parties, which brings together more than 2,000 cartoneros (waste picker) in Capital Federal and the suburbs, specifically in the neighborhoods of Lanús and Lomas de Zamora. After years of sacrifice and struggle, they managed to improve their working conditions. They have established a more logistical system—they no longer travel by hanging off of trucks, they have obtained a work incentive and uniforms, and lastly they have founded a nursery for 160 children, some of whom worked in the past as cartoneros. However, they still have to advance in designing a social security program that includes all the cartoneros of Buenos Aires. Additionally, they have to raise awareness among residents of the city to separate their trash so that they can collect door to door, without having direct contact with wet materials.

=== Organizing in Asia ===
India is home to Asia's largest waste picker movement. The Self-Employed Women's Association of India, a trade union that exclusively organizes women in the informal economy and has membership of over one million, began organizing waste pickers in the late 1970s. SEWA has created nearly ninety waste pickers cooperatives, which members use to gain collective work contracts and access to credit, training, and markets. One of Asia's largest waste picker associations is The Alliance of Indian Waste Pickers (AIW), a national network of 35 organizations in 22 cities. The AIW facilitates peers support, advocacy and cross-learning among waste pickers, iterant buyers, and support NGOs.

Also in India, the All India Kabari Mazdoor Mahasangh (AIKMM) is locked in a battle with the New Delhi Municipal Council, which closed a deal with the Hyderabad-based company, Ramky Energy and Environment Ltd to manage the waste, in effect criminalising the work of more than 100,000 unorganised waste pickers that currently sort about 20% of Delhi's garbage. The EJOLT project made a video on what they call the Delhi waste war. Waste pickers in Thailand have also organized, including the Khon Kaen scavengers.

In Delhi, the NGO Chintan Environmental Research and Action Group makes the work of waste pickers safer (by providing gloves and mouth masks) and it also provides for a steady source of income (by paying a monthly wage to the waste pickers).

Pune has a worker cooperative of waste pickers, SWaCH. SWaCH is an acronym for Solid Waste Collection Handling, that also means clean in the local language. This initiative empowers all members, who are both workers and shareholders. Among the workers, in most age groups, women constitute a larger group than men, totaling 78% of the group. However, men form the majority in the youngest age group. Before joining SWaCH, most members used to work as independent waste pickers or itinerant waste buyers. Another group is made up of former housekeeping and cleaning workers. The predominant group of SWaCH belongs to the scheduled caste, although other backward castes, as well as the middle castes, are also represented in SWaCH. This initiative is a result of the Inclusive Cities Project that aims to integrate waste pickers into Pune's municipal solid waste management system.

An Indian waste pickers union known as KKPKP recently carried out a mapping initiative to identify organizations of, or that work with, waste pickers across the continent—a first step towards the development of a pan-Asian network. Several NGOs and trade unions that work with waste pickers, as well as loosely formed groups of waste pickers, were identified in Cambodia, Indonesia, the Philippines, and Thailand.

In Bangladesh, the Grambangla Unnayan Committee is working with the waste picker community at the Dhaka City Corporation's Matuail Waste Dumpsite. A daycare centre and a non-formal primary school has been established for the child waste pickers where 112 child waste pickers are given early childhood care and education. Women waste pickers at Matuail have formed a waste pickers' cooperative.

=== Organizing in Africa ===
Egypt has one of the world's most well-established and robust informal recycling systems. The labor is done for the most part by the Zabaleen (informal waste collectors), a predominantly Coptic Christian community, which in the 1940s began collecting garbage—work viewed as impure by Egypt's Muslim majority. In 2003, the Zabaleen's existence and way of life came under threat when Cairo authorities awarded annual contracts of $50 million to three multinational garbage disposal companies, pushing the Zabaleen to collectively defend their livelihood.

The South African Waste Picker Association (SWAPA) was constituted in July 2009, which included 100 waste pickers from 26 landfills across the country. SWAPA currently (2024) has a membership of between 4,000 and 6,000 members drawn from all of South Africa's nine provinces. There are no present plans to create an African waste picker's network, but Shack/Slum Dwellers International has organized meetings between waste picker group leaders in Kenya, Egypt, and South Africa.

== See also ==
- Dumpster diving
- Gleaning
- Rag-and-bone man
- Tosher
- Mudlark
- Canner (recycling)
- Waste Land (film)
