= Mudlark (disambiguation) =

A mudlark is a person who scavenges in river mud for items of value, especially in London during the late 18th and 19th centuries.

Mudlark may also refer to:

== Arts and entertainment ==
- The Mudlark, a 1950 British film
- The Mudlarks, an English pop vocal group active in the late 1950s and early 1960s
- Mudlark (album), Leo Kottke's fourth album
- Mudlark (company), an English gamification company
- Girl with Ruffled Hair (The Mudlark), a portrait by Vincent van Gogh
- Mudlark, an imprint of HarperCollins UK

== Other uses ==
- Mudlark (bird), a bird (Grallina cyanoleuca)
- Mudlark, a model of Penton off-road motorcycle

== See also ==
- Mudlarking: Lost and Found on the River Thames, a 2019 book by Lara Maiklem
