= Mudlarking: Lost and Found on the River Thames =

2019 book

- Author: Lara Maiklem
- Publisher: Bloomsbury Circus
- Publication date: 18 Aug. 2019
- ISBN: 978-1-408-88921-3

Mudlarking: Lost and Found on the River Thames is a book written by Lara Maiklem and published August 2019 in UK, Australia and New Zealand by Bloomsbury. It was published in the US and Canada as Mudlark: In Search of London's History Along the River Thames by Liveright.

The book's author Lara Maiklem was inspired to become a mudlark after finding the stem of a clay pipe on the shore of the River Thames.

The book has been:

- 2nd on the Sunday Times Bestseller list
- BBC Radio 4 Book of the Week
- The Observer Book of the Year
- Daily Express Book of the Year
- The Guardian's "The best books of 2019 – picked by the year's best writers"
