= Museum of London Archaeology =

British archaeology heritage practice and charitable company

Coordinates: 51.53500°N 0.09020°W

MOLA (Museum of London Archaeology)
- Company type: Archaeology and built heritage practice and independent charitable organisation
- Predecessor: Department of Urban Archaeology (DUA), Department of Greater London Archaeology (DGLA), L – P : Archaeology, Museum of London Archaeology Service (MoLAS), Northamptonshire Archaeology
- Founded: 1973
- Headquarters: London; Northampton; Basingstoke; Stansted; Bristol; Chester
- Key people: Guy Hunt (Chief Executive)
- Revenue: 17,694,524 pound sterling (2021)
- Number of employees: 450 (2023)
- Website: mola.org.uk

MOLA (Museum of London Archaeology) is an archaeology and built heritage practice and independent charitable company registered with the Chartered Institute for Archaeologists (CIfA). It provides a wide range of professional archaeological services to clients in London and across the United Kingdom. As one of the largest archaeological service providers in the United Kingdom, MOLA is unique in holding IRO (Independent Research Organisation) status.

MOLA’s operations were historically focused within Greater London but have expanded nationwide. The organization employs over 300 staff across four locations: the central London headquarters, and further offices in Northampton, Basingstoke, and Birmingham.

Since registering as a charity in 2011, MOLA has pursued its own academic research strategy and developed extensive community engagement and education programmes. These include the Thames Discovery Programme, CITiZAN and the Time Truck.

Commercial services offered include expertise and advice at all stages of development from pre-planning onwards: management and consultancy advice, impact assessments, excavation, mitigation (urban, rural, infrastructure, and other schemes), standing building recording, surveying and geomatics, geoarchaeology, finds and environmental services, post-excavation and publication, graphics and photography, editing, and archiving.

Since 2017 MOLA has been part of a consortium with Headland Archaeology – MOLA Headland Infrastructure – to enable the delivery of archaeological and heritage services to large-scale infrastructure projects.

== Background ==
MOLA originated from a set of departments within the Museum of London but it is now entirely separate.

The Department of Urban Archaeology (DUA) was formed in 1973 as part of the Rescue archaeology movement, a response to the threat posed to unrecorded archaeological remains by increasing deep-basement office redevelopment in the City of London. Prior to this, recording remains prior to destruction was carried out by individuals and volunteers, including Andrew Westman. Public reaction to the publication of The Future of London's Past by archaeologist Martin Biddle helped to secure government funding for a small number of staff to found the DUA. The team was led by Brian Hobley and revolutionised the detailed understanding of London's archaeology and early history.

The Department of Greater London Archaeology (DGLA) was formed from several local archaeological societies in the 1980s and led by Harvey Sheldon to address similar concerns in other historical areas of the capital, particularly in Southwark and Inner North London.

The 1980s saw rapid development in the City of London, and an associated increase in archaeological work. The DUA and DGLA encouraged site developers to fund excavations prior to construction. As a result, both organisations grew rapidly, with each employing over 100 staff by the late 1980s.

Changes in the legislation surrounding archaeological work were taking place at the same time. Up until 1990, archaeological units throughout England provided both curatorial advice and contractual services. This dual role was increasingly seen as carrying a potential conflict of interest, and after the controversial redevelopment of Shakespeare's Rose Theatre site in Southwark changes were made to the planning guidance (PPG 16).

Responsibility for curatorial advice was transferred to local authorities in the cases of the City of London and Southwark, and to Greater London Archaeology Advisory Service (GLAAS) in the case of the other Greater London boroughs. Meanwhile, the DUA and DGLA merged in 1991 to form MoLAS (Museum of London Archaeology Service) to provide services as an archaeological contractor.

In 2011, MOLA separated entirely from the Museum of London, becoming an independent charitable company. It became one of only a handful of non-academic institutions to hold IRO (Independent Research Organisation) status in 2014. MOLA's operations continue to expand nationwide, with subsidiary offices established in Birmingham in 2011, Northampton in 2014 (with the acquisition of Northamptonshire Archaeology to form a new company: MOLA Northampton), and Basingstoke in 2017.

In 2015 MOLA became the host for the Coastal and Intertidal Zone Archaeological Network, known by its abbreviation CITiZAN, a community archaeology project, led by Gustav Milne, working in areas of England's coastline documenting coastal and intertidal history before it is washed away by tidal forces.

In 2022 MOLA acquired L – P : Archaeology, incorporating former L – P offices in Stansted, Chester, and Bristol. In 2023 one of the founding partners of L – P : Archaeology Guy Hunt was appointed as the Chief Executive of MOLA.

== Findings ==
Some of the larger and more important excavations have included the Roman amphitheatre at Guildhall Yard, a complex Roman and medieval sequence at No 1 Poultry near Bank Station, excavations within the Middle Saxon settlement at Covent Garden during the expansion of the Royal Opera House, excavations along the route of the Jubilee Line Extension in Southwark and Westminster, and the recovery of over 15,000 human skeletons during excavation of the Priory and Hospital of St Mary Spital in Spitalfields. Other notable work has been an English Heritage-funded programme of publication. General popular booklets and academic monographs are published in-house and have attracted consistently good reviews and several awards for private clients and developers. Major non-London projects have included the discovery of a Saxon princely burial at Prittlewell in Southend-on-Sea.

=== Roman London ===
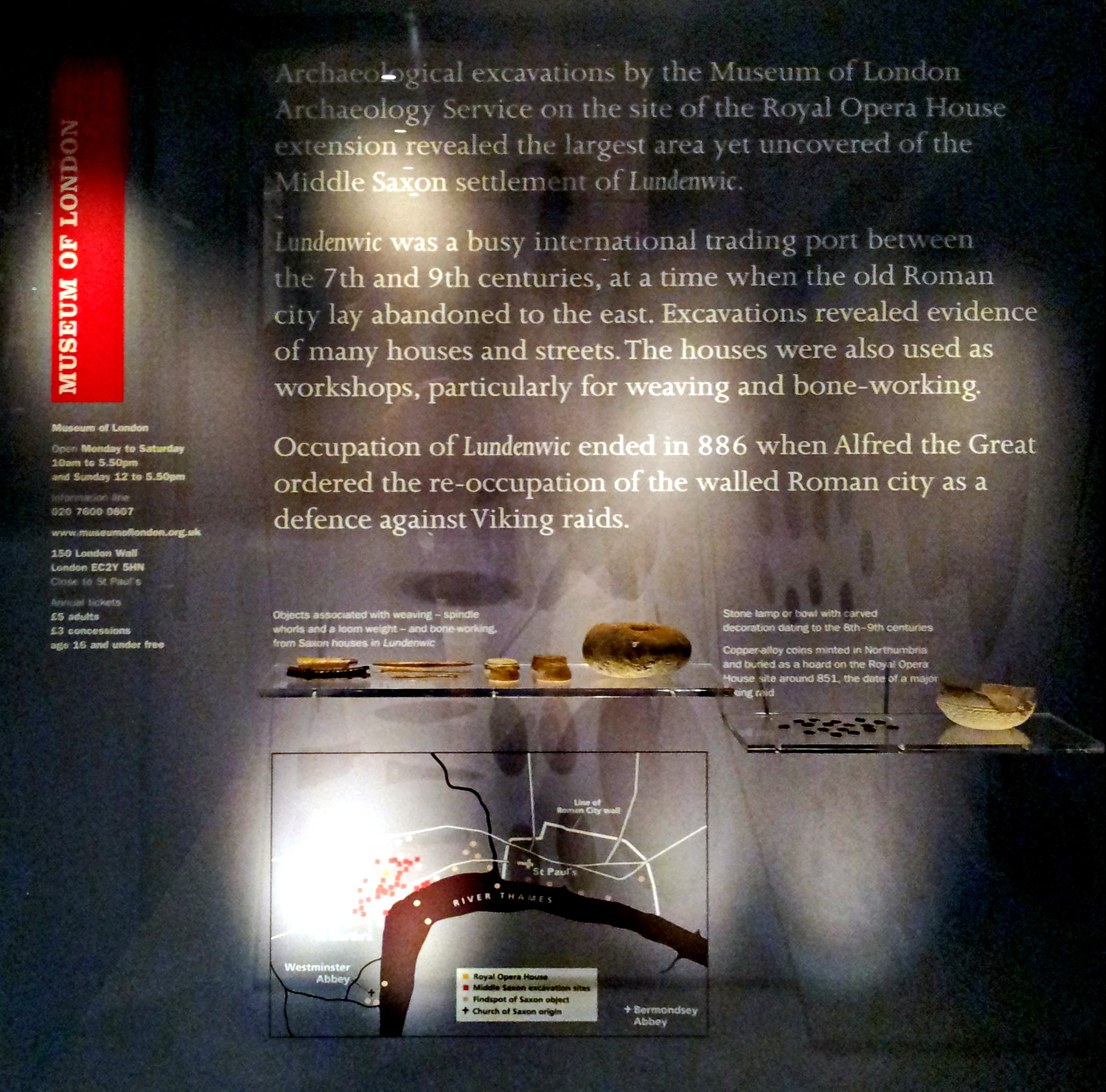
Display of finds at the Lundenwic site

Excavations by the DUA and DGLA in the 1970s and 1980s revealed that the history of the Roman founding and development of Londinium was much more complex than previously realised. London was established on a militarily-strategic and economically important location which is now the site of the City of London and North Southwark. The settlement was formed shortly after AD 43 AD, probably around the year 47, and a permanent river-crossing was established very near to the current position of London Bridge. Londinium grew rapidly in the 50s but was destroyed in the Boudican revolt around AD 60. The town was rebuilt shortly afterwards and became the provincial capital, enjoying substantial public investment and spectacular economic growth until its height in the early 2nd century.

An extensive fire, economic changes, and plague saw growth stagnate in the mid-2nd century, though defensive walls were added around AD 200 during or after the contention between Clodius Albinus and Septimius Severus. Later Roman London experienced urban renewal in many areas and remained an important centre, though it was no longer a large port or centre of trade. The town suffered a final decline in the late 4th century and was rapidly abandoned, with little evidence of occupation soon after the Roman withdrawal from Britain. Work in recent years by MOLA has continued to add significant information, with recent research findings including extramural Roman settlement in Westminster at St Martin-in-the-Fields and a post-Boudican fortified enclosure at Plantation Place on Cornhill.

=== Discovery of Lundenwic ===
Excavation in the City of London in the 1970s and 1980s had failed to find virtually any evidence of occupation in the period from the 5th to the 10th century despite apparently unambiguous historical evidence of London's existence at least from AD 604 onwards. However, the Department of Greater London Archaeology (DGLA) had discovered so-called Saxon farms in the area of Fleet Street, Covent Garden, and Westminster. In the mid 1980s, Alan Vince and Martin Biddle independently came up with the theory that London had been re-established not in the City but a couple of miles to the west, centred on the area called Aldwych. This Middle Saxon settlement was known as Lundenwic. Lundenwic was subjected to increasing Viking attack in the 9th century and the population may have been forced to scatter. Around the year 886, Alfred the Great moved the Londoners back into the City of London and the shelter of the Roman defensive walls, which still stood. The Late Saxon reoccupation of the Roman town site was known as Lundenburgh.
