= Mudlark =

Someone who scavenges for items of value on the shores of rivers

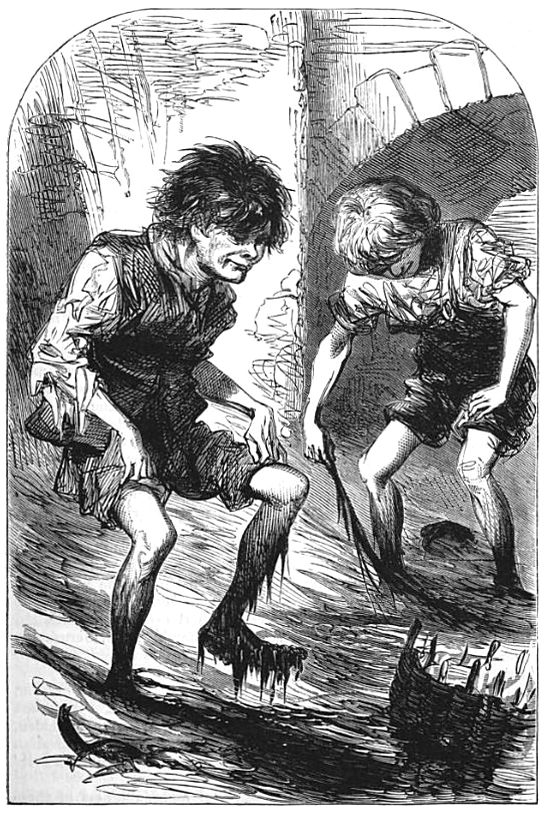
- Mudlarks of Victorian London (The Headington Magazine, 1871)

Description
- Fields of employment: Waste picker
- Related jobs: archaeologist; treasure hunter; Beachcomber

A mudlark is someone who scavenges the banks and shores of rivers for items of value, a term used especially to describe those who scavenged this way in London during the late 18th and 19th centuries. The practice of searching the banks of rivers for items continues in the modern era, with newer technology such as metal detectors sometimes being employed to search for metal valuables that may have washed ashore.

== Mudlarks in the 18th and 19th centuries ==
Mudlarks would search the muddy shores of the River Thames at low tide for anything that could be sold – sometimes, when occasion arose, pilfering from river traffic as well. By at least the late 18th century, people dwelling near the river could scrape a subsistence living this way. Mudlarks were usually either street children, youngsters aged between 8 and 15, or the robust elderly, and though most mudlarks were male, girls and women were also scavengers.

Becoming a mudlark was usually a choice dictated by poverty and lack of skills. Work conditions were filthy and uncomfortable, as excrement and waste would wash onto the shores from the raw sewage and sometimes also the corpses of humans, cats and dogs. Mudlarks would often get cuts from broken glass left on the shore. The income generated was seldom more than meagre; but mudlarks had a degree of independence, since (subject to tides) the hours they worked were entirely at their own discretion and they also kept everything they made as a result of their own labour.

A buckle found by a member of the Thames Discovery Programme on the Thames foreshore at the Tower of London

Henry Mayhew, in his book London Labour and the London Poor; Extra Volume, 1851, provides a detailed description of this category, and in a later edition of the same work includes the "Narrative of a Mudlark", an interview with a thirteen-year-old boy, Martin Prior.

Although in 1904 a person could still claim "mudlark" as an occupation, by then it seems to have been no longer viewed as an acceptable or lawful pursuit. By 1936 the word is used merely to describe swimsuited London schoolchildren earning pocket money during the summer holidays by begging passers-by to throw coins into the Thames mud, which they then chased, to the amusement of the onlookers.

== Modern times ==
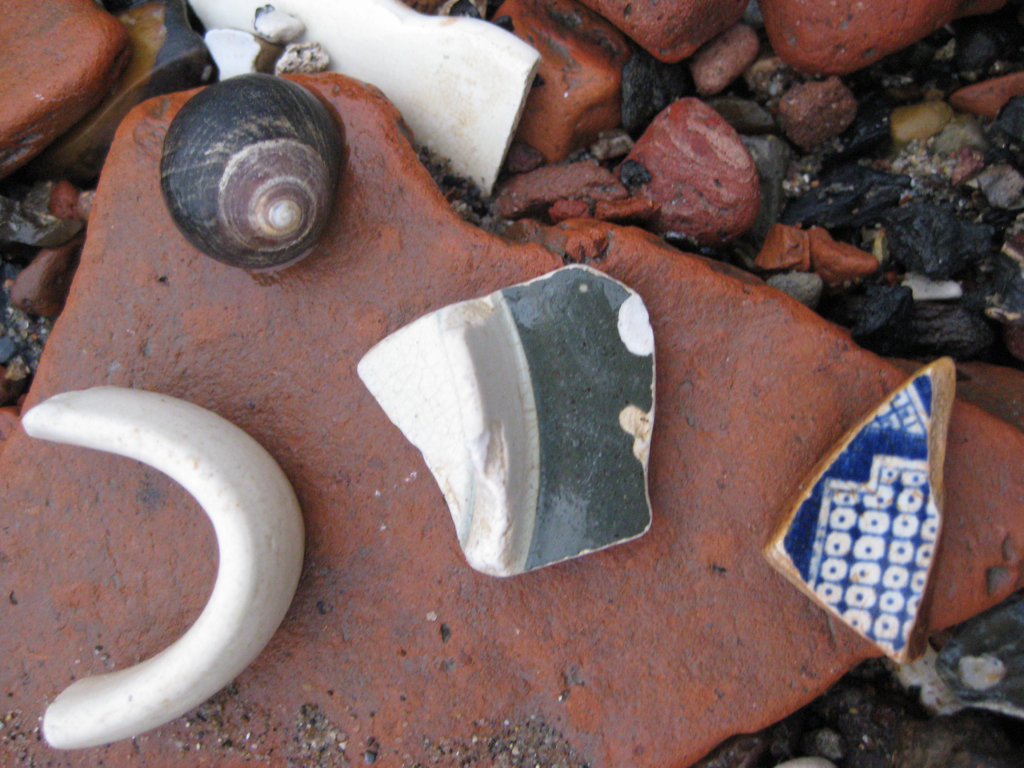
Fragments of pottery found while mudlarking on the River Thames in central London

Metal-detectorists and other individuals searching the foreshore for historic artefacts have described themselves as "mudlarks". In London, a licence is required from the Port of London Authority for this activity and it is illegal to search for or remove artefacts from the foreshore without one. The regulations changed in 2016, making Ted Sandling's book London in Fragments out of date in this respect.

The PLA state that "All the foreshore in the UK has an owner. Metal detecting, searching or digging is not a public right and as such it needs the permission of the landowner. The PLA and the Crown Estate are the largest land owners of Thames foreshore and jointly administer a permit which allows metal detecting, searching or digging". The PLA site has much useful information for permit holders including maps, rules and regulations about where digging is and is not permitted, safety and tide tables.

Occasionally, objects of archaeological value have been recovered from the Thames foreshore. Dependent on their value, these are either reported as treasure under the Treasure Act 1996, or voluntarily submitted for analysis and review via the Portable Antiquities Scheme.

A BBC article in July 2020 recommended the Thames Discovery Programme, "a group of historians and volunteers [running] guided tours" for novice mudlarks and in 2019 the book Mudlarking: Lost and Found on the River Thames by Lara Maiklem was published. The author had considerable experience in searching the banks of the river for historical artefacts. Rag and Bone: A Family History of What We've Thrown Away (2020) by Lisa Woollett is another examination of the subject.

The Museum of London is happy with the outcome of the mudlarks that search the Thames. Finds Liaison Officer, Stuart Wyatt, said "New, interesting artefacts are constantly being discovered by mudlarks and brought to the museum. Finds from the Thames are still giving us new information and adding to the collective knowledge. These objects are continuing to enhance our understanding of London's history and the lives of Londoners who inhabited the city over the last two millennia".

== See also ==
- Britain at Low Tide
- Beachcombing - the practice of searching beaches for items of value, interest or utility
- Junk man
- List of obsolete occupations
- Rag-and-bone man
- Magnet fishing — A modern method, in which a scavenger lowers a neodymium magnet into bodies of water to search for and retrieve metal items of value
- Tosher — someone who scavenges in sewers
- Waste picker

== Bibliography ==
- Arscott, David (2006). Wunt Be Druv: A Salute to the Sussex Dialect. Countryside Books. ISBN 978-1-84674-006-0.
