= Coastal and Intertidal Zone Archaeological Network =

Community archaeology project in England

Coastal and Intertidal Zone Archaeological Network, known by its abbreviation CITiZAN, is a community archaeology project working in areas of England's coastline documenting coastal and intertidal history before it is washed away by tidal forces.

== History ==
Coastal and Intertidal Zone Archaeological Network was launched in 2015 and is a community archaeology project working the north, south east, and south west of England. The project's main host is the Museum of London Archaeology with project partners the Council for British Archaeology and the Nautical Archaeology Society. The project is sponsored by the Heritage Lottery Fund, The National Trust, The Crown Estate, and Historic England.

The project is currently led by Gustav Milne, an Honorary Senior Lecturer at the UCL Institute of Archaeology. The team, as of October 2018, consisted of nine with all additional support to archaeology projects being provided by volunteers.

In 2018 they won the Arts, Culture, and Heritage prize at the Charity Awards 2018 – the Civil Society Media's annual awards programme to recognise organisations for their commendable charitable work and were granted further backing by the Heritage Lottery Fund beyond their initial three year funding cycle.

In addition to archaeological digs arranged by CITiZAN, the organisation arranges open days at historical locations to inform people of their work and methods in archaeology.

In 2018 CITiZAN team members joined the Channel 4 program Britain at Low Tide for its second series.

In 2022, CITiZAN ran a project at Mersea Island to record 60 years of peoples memories and documenting past industries damage that had led to the island's erosion.

In 2024, the Archaeology Data Service published the CITiZAN archives, a record of over 6,000 images, plus archaeology Datasets collated by CITIZAN since its inception. The archive had been collected via the coastal archaeology smartphone app and interactive website that it had developed.
