= USS C. W. Morse =

American paddle steamer leased by the U.S. Navy during WWI

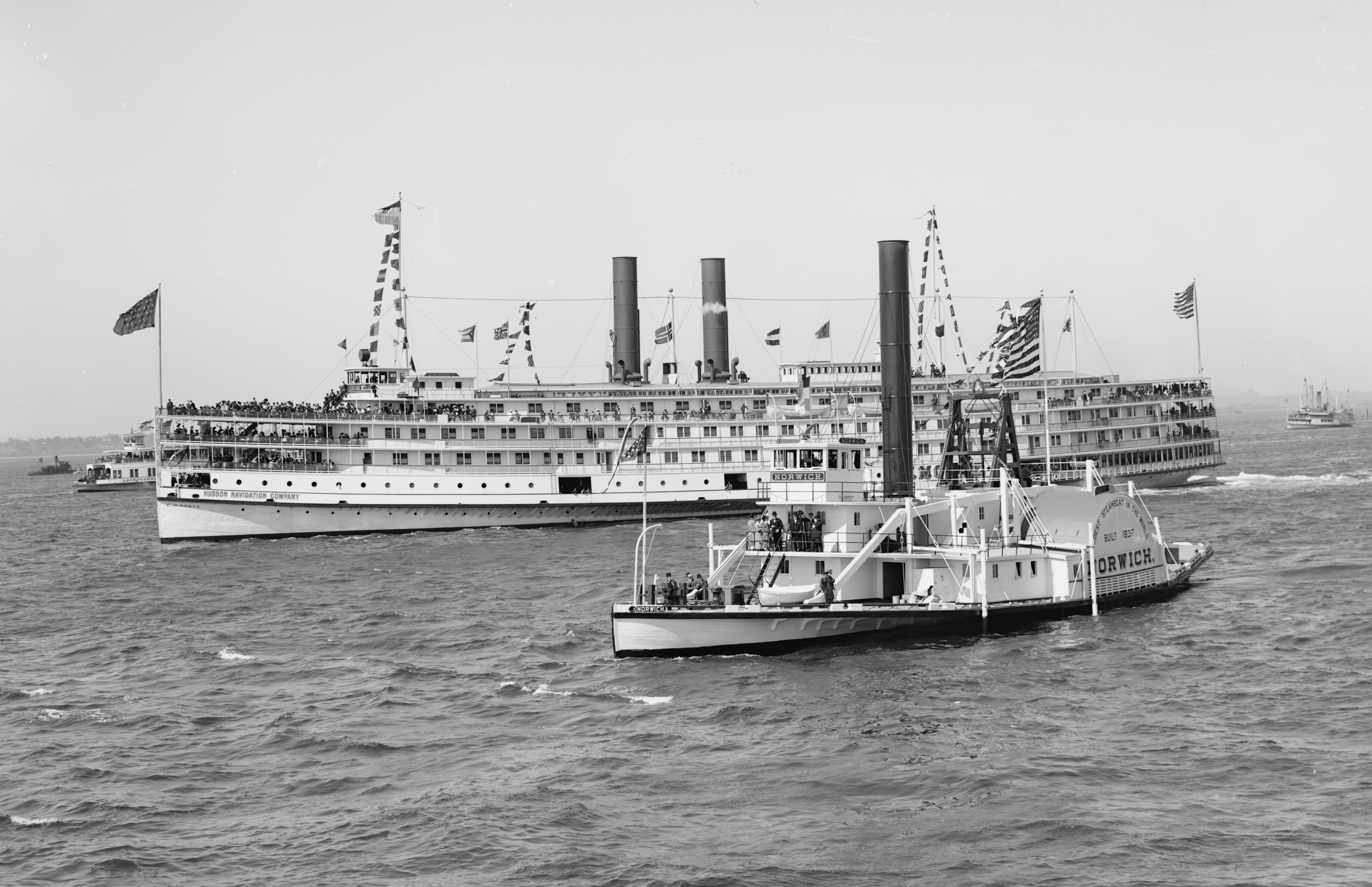
- C. W. Morse (background) and Norwich during the Hudson–Fulton Celebration, 1909

History

United States
- Name: USS C. W. Morse; USS Fort Orange
- Namesake: Former name retained
- Owner: People's Evening Line 1904 H. and N. Co. Line 1909
- Builder: Harlan & Hollingsworth Co, Wilmington, Delaware [hull] W. & A. Fletcher Co., Hoboken, New Jersey [engine & boilers]
- Laid down: date unknown
- Launched: 1902
- Christened: as Steamship C. W. Morse
- Completed: 1903 at Wilmington, Delaware
- Acquired: under charter December 1917
- In service: circa December 1917
- Out of service: circa February 1919
- Renamed: Fort Orange (1921)
- Stricken: circa February 1919
- Fate: Returned to her owners in February 1919; Laid up 1928; Scrapped 1935, Hull converted to a breakwater

General characteristics
- Type: Steamboat
- Tonnage: 4307 gross tons
- Length: 430 ft
- Beam: 50 1/2 ft
- Draft: 9 ft
- Depth: 14 1/2 ft
- Decks: 5
- Installed power: four lobster-back return-flue boilers
- Propulsion: 30' paddle-wheel, 4500 IHP
- Speed: 17 knots
- Armament: not known

USS C. W. Morse (ID 1966) was a paddle wheel steamer built in 1903, which was leased by the U.S. Navy for service during World War I. She served as a receiving ship in New York Harbor during the war. Post-war she was decommissioned and returned to her former owner.

== Hudson River steamer ==
C. W. Morse (No. 1966) was a 4307 gross ton paddle-wheel river passenger steamship which the Navy chartered during World War I. She was built in 1903 by Harlan and Hollingsworth at Wilmington, Delaware, for commercial employment on the Hudson River, New York.

On 30 April 1907 in fog conditions the C. W. Morse collided with the tugboat/lighter New York Central No. 4. The tug sank immediately. No one on board the Morse was injured, while the Engineer of the tug was drowned. Survivors were picked up by the Morse and by another tug. No blame for the accident was given, This was appealed in 1909, where both ships were found at fault and each responsible for half the damages.

== World War I service ==
On 12 December 1917 she was chartered by the Navy and placed in service as C.W. Morse (ID # 1966) in the 3rd Naval District in the New York City area as a receiving ship. She was returned to her owner on 10 February 1919.

== Post-war decommissioning ==
After World War I era use, she was returned to her owners in February 1919. She continued to sail on the Hudson until 1927. In 1928 the then owner, Hudson River Navigation Corp. kept her docked to reduce their line's operating costs. In 1930-31 large amounts of equipment and fittings were transferred to the other three ships of the line. She was formally scrapped in 1935, while her hull was used as a breakwater in Bridgeport, Connecticut.
