= Britain at Low Tide =

British archaeology documentary series

- Genre: Documentary
- Country of origin: United Kingdom
- Original language: English
- No. of series: 3
- No. of episodes: 12

Production
- Executive producer: Brendan Hughes / Harry Bell
- Producer: Michael Waterhouse
- Running time: 48 minutes

Original release
- Network: Channel 4
- Release: 19 November 2016 – 27 September 2019

Britain at Low Tide (also known as Shoreline Detectives) is an archaeology and social history television programme that debuted on Channel 4 in 2016, with further series in 2018 and 2019. It was originally co-hosted by former Time Team and Victorian Farm contributor, archaeologist and historian Dr. Alex Langlands and Natural History Museum palaeobiologist Dr. Tori Herridge.

== History ==
Britain at Low Tide is an archaeology programme, focusing on intertidal archaeology, that first aired on 19 November 2016 and ran for three episodes. The premise of the programme was that the presenters, Alex Langlands and Tori Herridge visit parts of Britain's coast along with coastal archaeologists showing their finds and the history behind them.

The second series started on 17 February 2018, now fronted by Dr. Tori Herridge and supported by archaeologists from CITiZAN (Coastal and Intertidal Zone Archaeological Network), Gustav Milne and Oliver Hutchinson as well as archaeologist Charlotte Mecklenburgh. In Scotland, archaeologists Tom Dawson, Joanna Hambly and Ellie Graham from The SCAPE Trust / University of St Andrews joined the team. A blog shows behind the scenes views of the filming.

Series three consisted of three episodes and was broadcast starting on 14 September 2019. The series again featured archaeologists from CITiZAN and The SCAPE Trust.

== List of episodes ==
=== Series 1 ===
| Episode number | Original date aired | Episode information | Viewing figure | Series Director | Executive Producer/s | Series Producer |
|---|---|---|---|---|---|---|
| 1 | 19 November 2016 | Alex and Tori visit the Northumberland coast where they visit a French fishing trawler wrecked off the coast at Howick, and identify a stone structure in the water at Beadnell. | 1.23m | Michael Waterhouse | Brendan Hughes and Harry Bell | Michael Waterhouse |
| 2 | 26 November 2016 | Alex and Tori visit Merseyside coast where they explore rubble from the Second World War, discover a story similar to the film Whisky Galore (novel) and evidence of animal and human activity from 7000 years ago. | 1.11m | Michael Waterhouse | Brendan Hughes and Harry Bell | Michael Waterhouse |
| 3 | 3 December 2016 | Alex and Tori visit the Essex coast, where they discover a First World War German U-boat, investigate a fort built during the reign of Henry VIII of England and show the history of the Thames Barge. | 1.17m | Michael Waterhouse | Brendan Hughes and Harry Bell | Michael Waterhouse |

=== Series 2 ===
| Episode number | Episode name | Original date aired | Episode information | Viewing figure | Episode Director | Executive Producer/s | Series Producer |
|---|---|---|---|---|---|---|---|
| 1 | East Sussex | 17 February 2018 | Tori and the team look at ship wreck from the 18th century, a harbour that took 63 years to build and a prehistoric well shaft. | 1.31m | Michael Waterhouse | Brendan Hughes and Harry Bell | Michael Waterhouse |
| 2 | Dorset | 24 February 2018 | Tori and the team visit Studland Bay to discover the history of the D Day landings, an Iron Age monument that appears sometimes for a few hours each year, and the history of the world's first Aircraft Carrier. | 1.08m | Catherine Abbott | Brendan Hughes and Harry Bell | Michael Waterhouse |
| 3 | The Clyde | 3 March 2018 | Tori and the team visit the banks of the Clyde, discovering the maritime history of Glasgow along its banks. They visit the Newshot boat graveyard, learn about the Dumbuck Crannog and discover how the Clyde was made deeper. | 1.1m | Catherine Abbott | Brendan Hughes and Harry Bell | Michael Waterhouse |
| 4 | The Severn | 17 March 2018 | Tori and the team visit the banks of the Severn, discovering a mysterious island, the medieval village of Sudbrook which disappeared into the sea and the first attempts of tunnelling under the Estuary. | 1.04m | Michael Waterhouse | Brendan Hughes and Harry Bell | Michael Waterhouse |
| 5 | East Yorkshire | 24 March 2018 | Tori and the team discover the sunken remains of the Admiral Von Tromp in Saltwick Bay, visit a First World War fort and the story of two ships built in Hull that ended up on top of a mountain in Peru. | 1.05m | Catherine Abbott | Brendan Hughes and Harry Bell | Michael Waterhouse |
| 6 | Fife | 31 March 2018 | Tori and the team visit Fife and the Firths of Tay and Forth. They examine a wreck believed to have been used in the Salvage operation for the 1879 Tay Bridge disaster, investigate salt pans from the 16th century and stone carvings in local caves. | 0.84m | Catherine Abbott | Brendan Hughes and Harry Bell | Michael Waterhouse |

=== Series 3 ===
| Episode number | Episode name | Original date aired | Episode information | Viewing figure | Episode Director | Executive Producer/s | Series Producer |
|---|---|---|---|---|---|---|---|
| 1 | Whitstable | 14 September 2019 | On the stunning north Kent coast Dr Tori Herridge and the team follow a shipwreck discovery and explore a forgotten military base. | 1.011m | | | |
| 2 | Firth of Forth | 21 September 2019 | Exploring the inner reaches of the Firth of Forth in Scotland, Dr Tori Herridge and the team investigate the story of a long-forgotten harbour and discover a 19th-century pier. | | | | |
| 3 | Solway Firth | 27 September 2019 | In the Solway Firth, Dr Tori Herridge and the team tell the story of a tragic mining disaster that took place four miles out to sea, and find a huge oval-shaped swimming pool off the coast. | | | | |

"*"If there is not any viewing figures, the programme did not appear in BARB top 20 figures for Channel 4.
