= Lara Maiklem =

British author

Lara Maiklem FSA (born 1971) is a British author and antiquarian known for her writing and speaking on mudlarking. She has been mudlarking since 2012. She was elected a Fellow of the Society of Antiquaries of London in 2022 and made Mudlark in Residence at Southwark Cathedral in 2026. She is also the first woman to hold the ancient position of Juror for the Court Leet of the King’s Borough of Southwark and she is an Associate Brother of the Art Worker’s Guild.

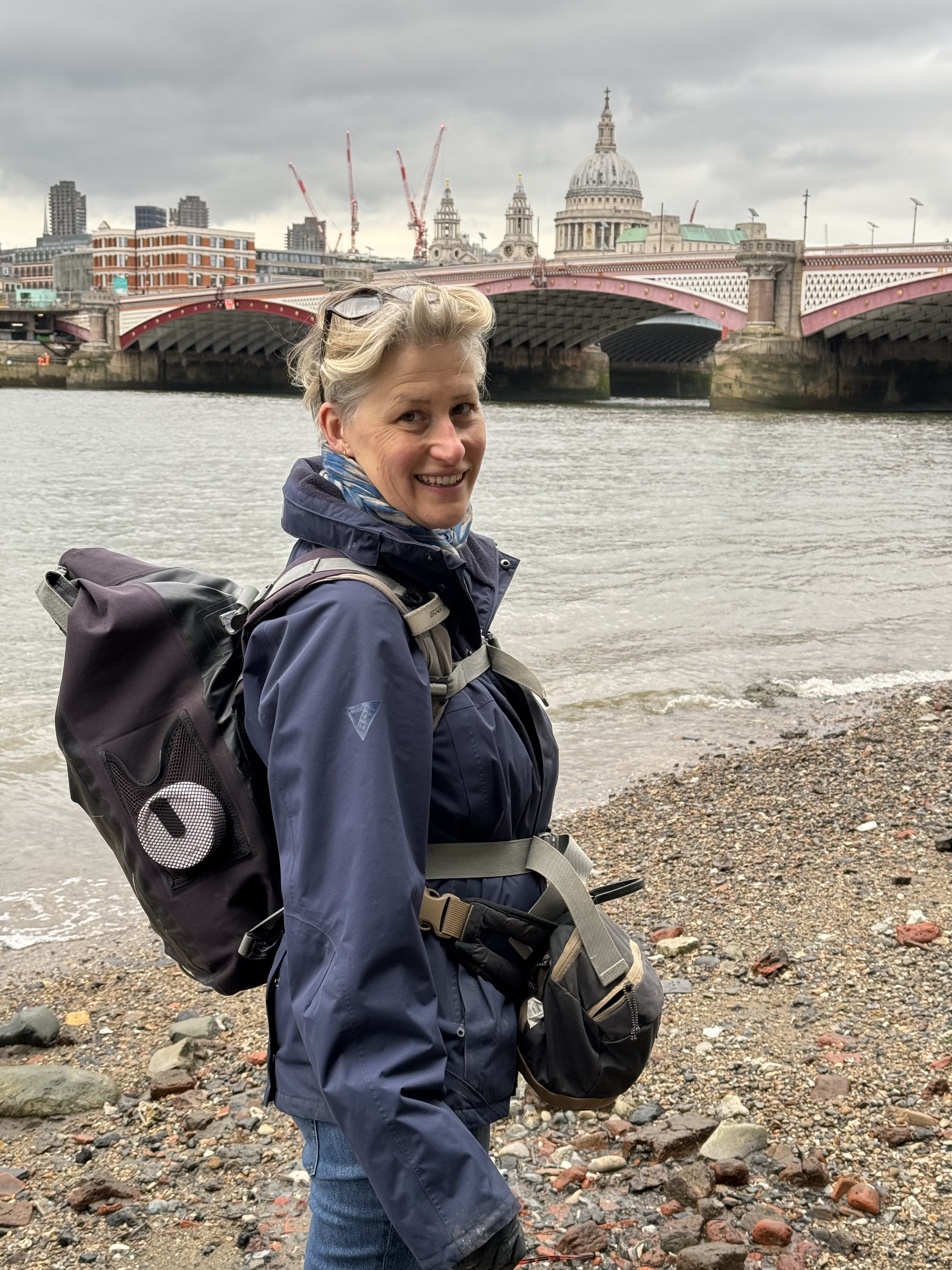
Author and mudlark Lara Maiklem beside the river Thames with Blackfriars Bridge and St Paul’s Cathedral in the background

== Personal life ==
Maiklem grew up on a dairy farm in Surrey. She read sociology and social anthropology at Newcastle University before moving to London where she worked in publishing. She now lives with her partner and children on the Kent coast.

== Mudlarking ==
During her childhood Maiklem was fascinated by the past in the form of pottery shards, glass bottle stoppers, fossils and clay pipes, which she found in the garden and fields of the family's farm. After moving to London she began to mudlark on the tidal banks of the River Thames where she scavenged for objects that had been lost and dropped into the river. Some of Maiklem's most treasured discoveries are a Tudor shoe, a medieval pilgrim badge, a complete Iron Age pot, a Roman auxiliary soldier's sword scabbard chape and a 16th-century sword.

== Media ==
In August 2019, Maiklem's first book Mudlarking: Lost and Found on the River Thames was published by Bloomsbury in the UK, Australia and New Zealand and under the title Mudlark: Searching for London's Past Along the River Thames by Liveright in the US and Canada. Mudlarking appeared in a cartoon by Nick Newman in Private Eye.

The Guardian called it "A fascinating insight into the discarded objects and lost things that wash up on the foreshore". The Daily Telegraph considered her description of the fog to be "worthy of Dickens or Joseph Conrad". Literary Review described it as "A lovely, lyrical, gently meandering book, filled with fascinating diversions and detail".

On publication it became an instant Sunday Times Bestseller and was a BBC Radio 4 Book of the Week in August 2019. Mudlarking was Book of the Month at Foyles, an Observer Book of the Year 2019, a Daily Express Greatest Read 2019 and an Apple Books pick for 2019. Mudlarking won the 2020 Indie Award for Non Fiction.

In 2021 Bloomsbury published her second book, A Field Guide to Larking: Beachcombing, Mudlarking, Fieldwalking and More, an illustrated guide to how to search for lost objects and how to identify what you find. It was a Waterstones Best Book of 2021 and was shortlisted for the London Archaeology Prize. In 2022 she published a children’s book, Looking for Treasure with Harper Collins and in 2024 Maiklem published her fourth book with Bloomsbury, A Mudlarking Year: Finding Treasure in Every Season.

Maiklem has made radio and television appearances on the BBC, Smithsonian Channel, Travel Channel, Channel 5, NPR and ABC Australia. Maiklem did a TED Talk in October 2019 and a Google Talk in September 2019. She wrote a short series about mudlarking for BBC Radio 3, has written articles for the Guardian, the Telegraph, the Financial Times, Daily Express, BBC Countryfile and The Spectator and has spoken on mudlarking at private events and festivals.

== Publications ==
- (2019) Mudlarking: Lost and Found on the River Thames, Bloomsbury (UK, Aus and NZ edition) ISBN 978-1408889213
- (2019) Mudlark: In Search of London's Past Along the River Thames, Liveright (US and CAN edition) ISBN 978-1631494963
- (2021) A Field Guide to Larking: Beachcombing, Mudlarking, Fieldwalking and More, Bloomsbury ISBN 978-1526634214
- (2022) The Armourer's House, Rosemary Sutcliff (introduction by Lara Maiklem) ISBN 978-1919642116
- (2022) Looking for Treasure, Harper Collins ISBN 978-0008552121
- (2024) A Mudlarking Year: Finding Treasure in Every Season, Bloomsbury ISBN 978-1526660756
