= Gustav Milne =

Gustav Milne is a British archaeologist, writer and TV contributor who is the current project lead for Coastal and Intertidal Zone Archaeological Network (CITiZAN) and Honorary Senior Lecturer at the UCL Institute of Archaeology.

== History ==
Gustav Milne studied archaeology at University of Oxford and completed his MPhil at the University of London, where he wrote a thesis on ancient harbour installations. He started his career as a volunteer for the Guildhall Museum at the site of Custom House in the City of London. Between 1973 and 1991 he worked for the Museum of London as a professional rescue archaeologist, working on various archaeological digs including Pudding Lane and the Roman London Bridge. During this time he wrote many reports on his findings.

In 1991 Milne joined UCL Institute of Archaeology as a Senior Lecturer (in London Archaeology and Maritime Archaeology). In 1992 he became the secretary of the newly formed London Archaeological Research facility. In 1993 he founded the Thames Archaeology Survey, a project to compile an inventory of archaeological and palaeo-environmental sites exposed between Teddington and Dartford, before going onto form the Thames Discovery Programme in 2008. In 2013, he was nominated as one of Current Archaeology's "Archaeologists of the Year" and the Thames Discovery Programme won the Archaeology Training Forum's Training Award, which was presented at the IfA Conference in Birmingham.

In 2015 he helped create the Coastal and Intertidal Zone Archaeological Network (CITiZAN) which he currently holds the position of Project Leader, and the founder and co-ordinator for UCL 'Evolutionary Determinants of Health' programme. He has also set up the Museum of London's Centre for Human Bioarchaeology with a grant from the Wellcome Trust.

== Television work ==
Milne has appeared as an archaeology expert on several television programme since the 1990s, with many appearances on Time Team amongst those. He has also appeared as a contributor to Digging for Britain - The Tudors and TV documentaries The Bridges That Built London and Fire, Plague, War and Treason.

Through his project leadership at CITiZAN, in 2016 he assisted Tern TV in setting up the archaeology program Britain at Low Tide. In 2018 he became a regular contributor for the Channel 4 program.

== Bibliography ==
- 1981 – Waterfront Archaeology in Britain and Northern Europe (CBA Research Report No 41) ISBN 9780906780084
- 1983 – Medieval Waterfront Development at Trig Lane, London: An account of the excavations at Trig Lane, London, 1974–6 and related research (with C. Milne) ISBN 9780903290241
- 1985 – Port Roman London ISBN 9780713443653
- 1986 – The Great Fire of London ISBN 9780950365695
- 1989 – Aspects of Saxo-Norman London: 1 – Building and Street Development Near Billingsgate and Cheapside (Special paper/London and Middlesex Archaeological Society) (with V. Horsman and C. Milne) ISBN 9780903290364
- 1992 – From Roman Basilica to Medieval Market: Archaeology in Action in the City of London ISBN 9780112904465
- 1992 – Wharram: Two Anglo-Saxon Buildings and Associated Finds v. 7: A Study of Settlement on the Yorkshire Wolds (York University Archaeology Publications) (with J. D. Richards) ISBN 9780946722099
- 1992 – Timber Building Techniques In London c.900–1400: an Archaeological Study Of Waterfront Installations and Related Material ISBN 9780903290418
- 1995 – Roman London ISBN 9780713468519
- 1999 – St Brides Church, London (Archaeological Report / English Heritage) ISBN 9781850746270
- 2002 – Excavations At Medieval Cripplegate, London: Archaeology After The Blitz, 1946–48 ISBN 9781850747710
- 2003 – The Port of Medieval London ISBN 9780752425443
- 2017 – Uncivilised Genes: Human evolution and the urban paradox ISBN 9781781352656
