= Thames Discovery Programme =

English community archaeology project

- Abbreviation: TDP
- Formation: 2008
- Purpose: Promotion of the historic River Thames
- Location: London
- Website: thamesdiscovery.org

The Thames Discovery Programme is a community archaeology project, focusing on the archaeology of the River Thames on the Tideway. The Thames Discovery Programme (TDP) was launched in October 2008 and until September 2011, the project was supported by the National Lottery and a grant from the Heritage Lottery Fund. The project is designed to communicate an understanding and informed enjoyment of the historic Thames to the widest possible audience, and to train and support members of the public (the Foreshore Recording and Observation Group or FROG) to monitor and record the archaeology of the foreshore during the lifetime of the project, and into the future.

The project builds on initiatives pioneered by the Museum of London's Thames Archaeological Survey that took place from 1993 to 1999, the work of commercial archaeological units, such as Museum of London Archaeology and the Thames Explorer Trust's innovative education projects. Over three years, archaeologists from the programme surveyed 20 archaeological sites along the tidal Thames in the Greater London area, supported by the work of the Foreshore Recording and Observation Group or FROG, who monitor the surveyed sites for changes, as the daily tides scour away the remaining archaeological features. The FROG is made up of volunteer members of the public, who are trained in foreshore recording techniques, the history and archaeology of the River Thames, health and safety and participation in digital media by the TDP team.

The TDP currently has a small staff team and is hosted by Museum of London Archaeology. As at the start of 2019 this staff consists of four professional archaeologists. There are estimated to be around 150 active FROG volunteers. Partners and supporters include the Thames Explorer Trust, the Museum of London, the Port of London Authority, English Heritage, and the University College London Institute of Archaeology.

== Discoveries ==
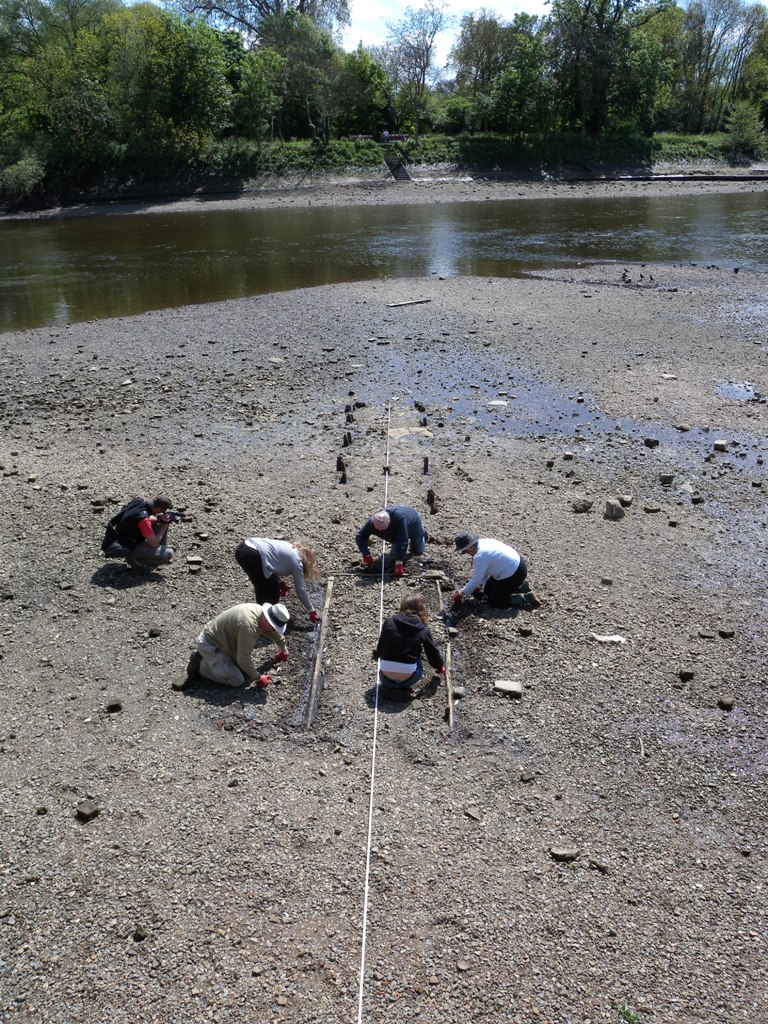
Recording the causeway at Isleworth

Using data generated by the Thames Archaeological Survey, the Thames Discovery Programme selected twenty key sites across the Greater London area for further recording and on-going monitoring during 2008 - 2011. The first site chosen was Custom House, London; in February 2009, FROG members recorded the causeway, parts of the 1819 riverside wall, the Custom House gridiron, the remains of two vessels partly buried on the foreshore and a multi-phase revetment structure located under Billingsgate Wharf.

In April 2009, an examination of access to the foreshore at Isleworth included recording the 20th century boat slipway and the remains of the Victorian 'Church Ferry' causeway.

During low tides in June and July 2009, survey and recording at Charlton, London, formerly the location of Castle's Shipbreakers Yard focused on the 'stack' of very large ships timbers surviving at the top of the foreshore which represent the remains of one or more warship class vessels. Nautical remains are very well represented at this site where, in addition to the 'stack', we have also discovered a slipway constructed of reused ship and boat timbers, as well as the remains of at least three smaller vessels. During the 2009 Summer Season, teams worked at Alderman Stairs (near St Katharine Docks), Putney and Bermondsey. In November 2009, the first FROG-led project at Carrara Wharf in Fulham recorded part of the 1729 bridge to Putney, while a TDP survey earlier in the year on the foreshore in front of Fulham Palace found Iron Age timber piles.

During January 2010, investigations on the Isle of Dogs with the Thames and Field Metal Detecting Society discovered the remains of a human skeleton, dating to the early 18th century.

A buckle found on the Tower of London foreshore in July 2010

During the 2010 Summer Season, work continued on the Isle of Dogs, recording the remains of the slipways used during the launch of the SS Great Eastern, the last project of engineer Isambard Kingdom Brunel. In July 2010, the TDP team and the FROG worked on the foreshore at the Tower of London, undertaking survey and recording of an area normally closed to the public. Sections of the riverside wall were recorded and data collected to create a contour survey of the foreshore surface.

The team also worked with members of the Society of Thames Mudlarks and the Portable Antiquities Scheme to record artefacts found on the surface. The TDP field team then moved to Greenwich where the riverside wall was again examined, together with parts of a Tudor timber jetty and a newly discovered medieval structure. The project also featured on the BBC's Digging for Britain. During late August 2010, work was undertaken at two sites in West London, while in September, fieldwork was undertaken at Tripcockness near the Royal Arsenal and Rotherhithe.

In January 2011, the project published the results of recent investigations at Vauxhall, where the remains of the oldest structure so far discovered in the London area, dating to the late Mesolithic period, have been recorded by the Thames Discovery Programme, English Heritage and the Museum of London.

During the 2011 summer field season, the TDP worked at Brentford, recording the remains of two vessels abandoned on the foreshore, and at Wapping, surveying the watermans' causeway and nautical remains. Further fieldwork was also undertaken at Greenwich and at the Tower of London foreshore.

== Outreach and events ==
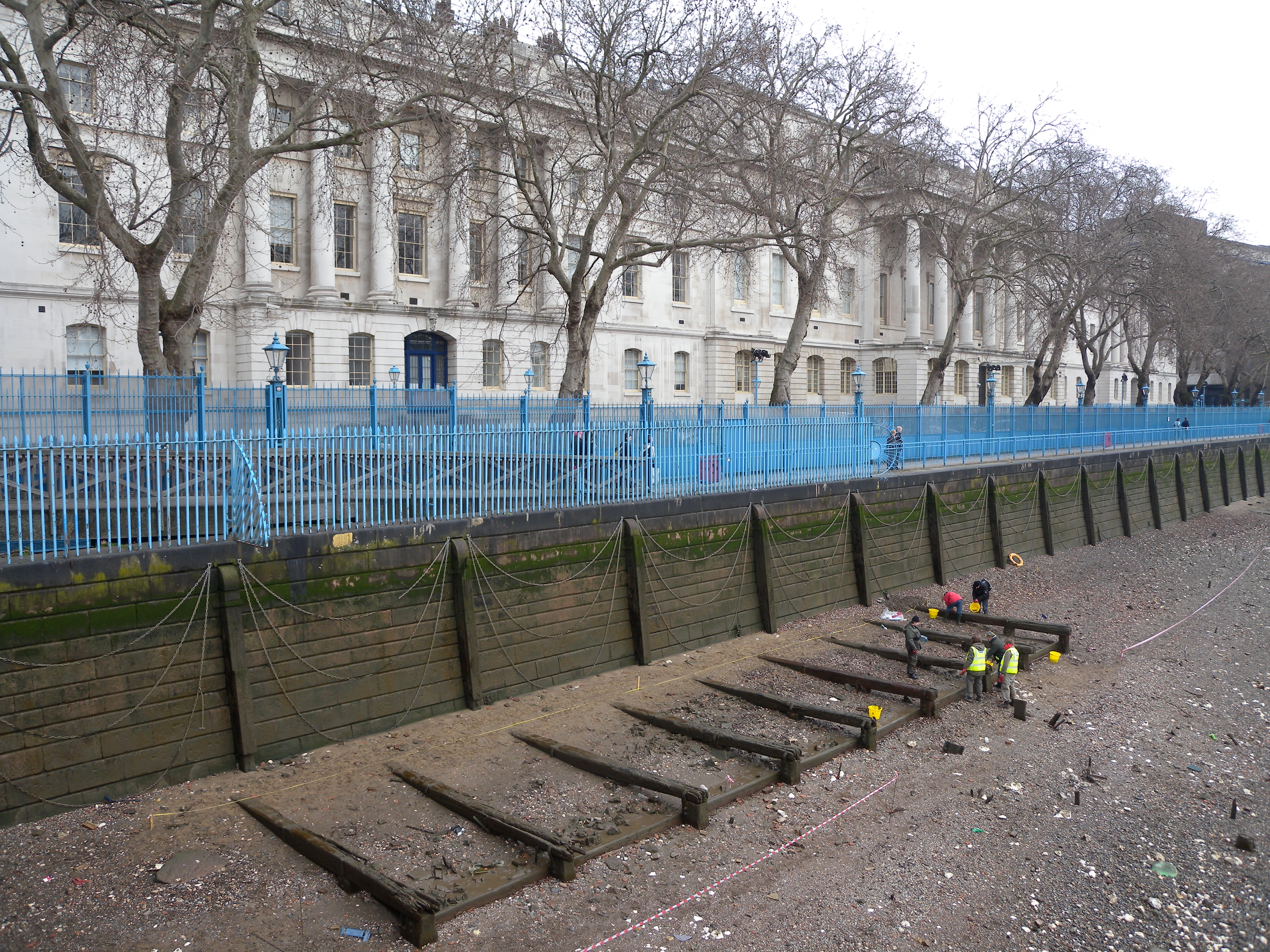
Recording the gridiron at Custom House

The Thames Discovery Programme runs a programme of events and activities designed to engage the public with the archaeology and history of the river. Outreach activities undertaken by the project including public lectures, small exhibitions, information stands, guided walks on the foreshore, observation of the FROG members in action on site and events for families and school groups, seminars, workshops and conferences.

In 2009 the Thames Discovery Programme worked with a number of different organisations including Fulham Palace, Historic Royal Palaces, Gunnersbury Park Museum, Camden Young Archaeologists Club, the University of East London, Thames Explorer Trust, Thames Estuary Partnership, the London Archaeological Archive and Research Centre, the Worshipful Company of Antiquarian Collectors, the Museum of London and Museum in Docklands. During 2010 and 2011, the team again worked with a number of different organisations including the Royal Society for the Protection of Birds at Rainham Marshes, Discover Greenwich, Historic Royal Palaces at the Tower of London and Southwark Cathedral.

The project also featured in the Archaeology in Action gallery at the Museum of London. Thousands of members of the public have visited the foreshore and attended other events, particularly during the two-week Festival of British Archaeology coordinated by the Council for British Archaeology in July each year. In July 2009, the Thames Discovery Programme celebrated the Festival at Fulham Palace and on the foreshore and in 2010 the team were at the Tower of London, Hall Place and the Museum of London.

A detailed report on the events, activities and fieldwork undertaken by the Thames Discovery Programme during the Heritage Lottery Funded phase of the project (October 2008-September 2011) is available on the project website.

In 2017 a book entitled The river’s tale: archaeology on the Thames foreshore in Greater London by Nathalie Cohen and Eliott Wragg was published by MOLA.

== Awards ==
The TDP website won the award for the "Best Representation of Archaeology in the Media" at the 2010 British Archaeological Awards and in February 2011, the project was one of five from across Britain nominated by Current Archaeology as "Best Research Project of 2011". In July 2012, the project won the award for "Best Community Archaeology Project" at the British Archaeological Awards.

In 2013, TDP's then Project Director Gustav Milne was nominated as one of Current Archaeology's "Archaeologists of the Year" and the Thames Discovery Programme won the Archaeology Training Forum's Training Award, which was presented at the IfA Conference in Birmingham.
